= Saint Peter =

Apostle of Jesus

Pope Saint Peter the Apostle
- Prince of the Apostles; Bishop of Rome; Bishop of Antioch
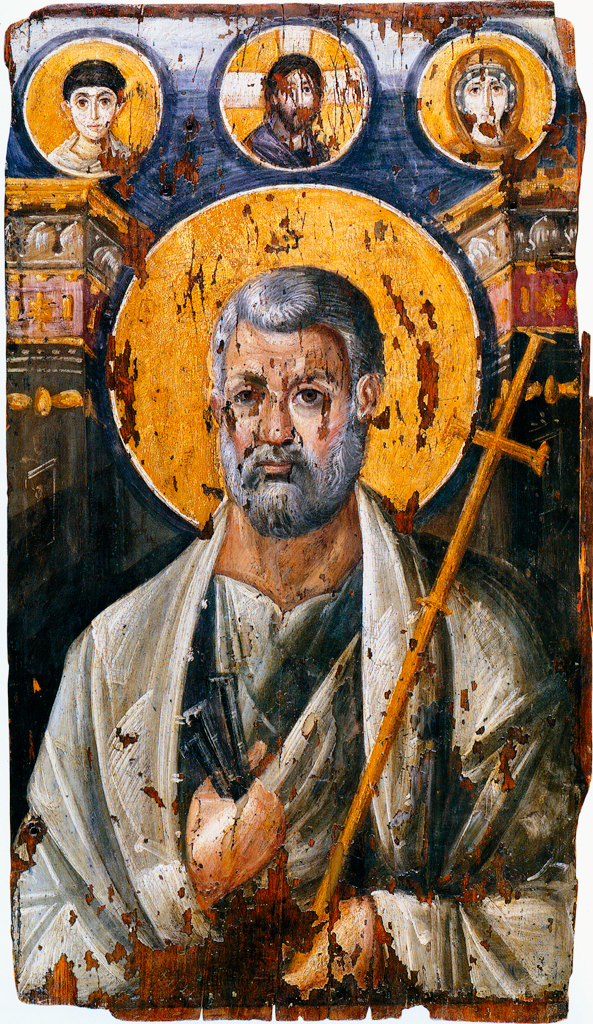
- Saint Peter (6th-century)
- See: First bishop of Rome and first bishop of Antioch, according to Catholic and Eastern Christian tradition
- Papacy began: c. AD 30
- Papacy ended: Between 64 and 68 AD
- Successor: Bishop of Rome (according to tradition): Linus; Bishop of Antioch (according to tradition): Evodius

Orders
- Ordination: c. AD 30 by Jesus Christ
- Consecration: c. AD 30 by Jesus Christ

Personal details
- Born: Shimon bar Yonah probably c. 1 BC Bethsaida, Herodian tetrarchy, Roman Empire
- Died: Between 64 and 68 AD Vatican Hill, Rome, Italia, Roman Empire
- Parents: Jonah (or Jona; John)
- Occupation: Fisherman, clergyman, Bishop of Rome and Antioch (Catholic and Eastern Christian tradition)

Sainthood
- Feast day: Main feast: Feast of Saints Peter and Paul (with Paul the Apostle) 29 June (Catholic Church, Eastern Orthodox Church, Oriental Orthodoxy, Anglicanism, Lutheranism); 18 January: Confession of Saint Peter (Anglicanism, Lutheranism); 22 February: Chair of Saint Peter (Catholic Church)
- Venerated in: All Christian denominations that venerate saints
- Title as Saint: Saint Peter the Apostle
- Canonized: Pre-Congregation
- Attributes: Keys of Heaven, Red Martyr, pallium, papal vestments, rooster, man crucified upside down, vested as an Apostle, holding a book or scroll, Cross of Saint Peter
- Patronage: Patronage list
- Shrines: St. Peter's Basilica; Church of St. Peter

Saint Peter (Note: Hebrew: שמעון בר יונה, romanized: Šīmʿōn bar Yōnā; Classical Syriac: ܫܸܡܥܘܿܢ ܟܹ݁ܐܦ݂ܵܐ, romanized: Šemʿōn Kēp̄ā; Arabic: سِمعَان بُطرُس, romanized: Simʿān Buṭrus; Ancient Greek: Πέτρος, romanized: Petros, lit. 'Rock'; Coptic: Ⲡⲉⲧⲣⲟⲥ, romanized: Petros; Latin: Petrus; Arabic: شمعون الصفا, romanized: Shamʿūn aṣ-Ṣafā, lit. 'Simon the Pure') (born Simon bar Jonah; c. 1 BC – AD 64/68), also known as Peter the Apostle, Simon Peter, (Note: Other names include Simeon or Simon.) or Cephas, was one of the Twelve Apostles of Jesus and one of the first leaders of the early Christian Church. He appears repeatedly and prominently in all four New Testament gospels, as well as the Acts of the Apostles. Catholic and Orthodox tradition treats Peter as the first bishop of Rome (or pope) and also as the first bishop of Antioch. According to Christian tradition, Peter was crucified upside down in Rome under Emperor Nero.

The ancient Christian churches venerate Peter as a major saint and the founder of the Church of Antioch and the Church of Rome, but they differ in their attitudes regarding the authority of his successors. According to Catholic teaching, Jesus promised Peter a special position in the church. In the New Testament, the name "Simon Peter" is found 19 times. He is the brother of Andrew, and they both were fishermen. The Gospel of Mark, in particular, is traditionally thought to show the influence of Peter's preaching and eyewitness accounts. He is also mentioned as Peter or Cephas in Paul's First Letter to the Corinthians and the Epistle to the Galatians. The New Testament also includes two general epistles, First Peter and Second Peter, which are traditionally attributed to him, but modern scholarship generally rejects the Petrine authorship of both.

Outside of the New Testament, several apocryphal books were later attributed to him, in particular the Acts of Peter, Gospel of Peter, the Preaching of Peter, Apocalypse of Peter, and Judgment of Peter, although scholars believe these works to be pseudepigrapha.

Although the New Testament does not explicitly identify Peter as the first bishop of Rome or detail his journey there, early Church Fathers and historians, including Irenaeus, Tertullian, Hegesippus, Clement of Alexandria, Lactantius, and Eusebius attest that Peter spent his closing years in Rome, and along with Paul founded the Church in Rome and conferred the episcopal office upon Linus. These accounts also maintain that Peter was martyred in Rome, traditionally on Vatican Hill during Nero's reign. The late second-century writer Caius further testified that the monuments of Peter were located at the Vatican.

== Names and etymologies ==
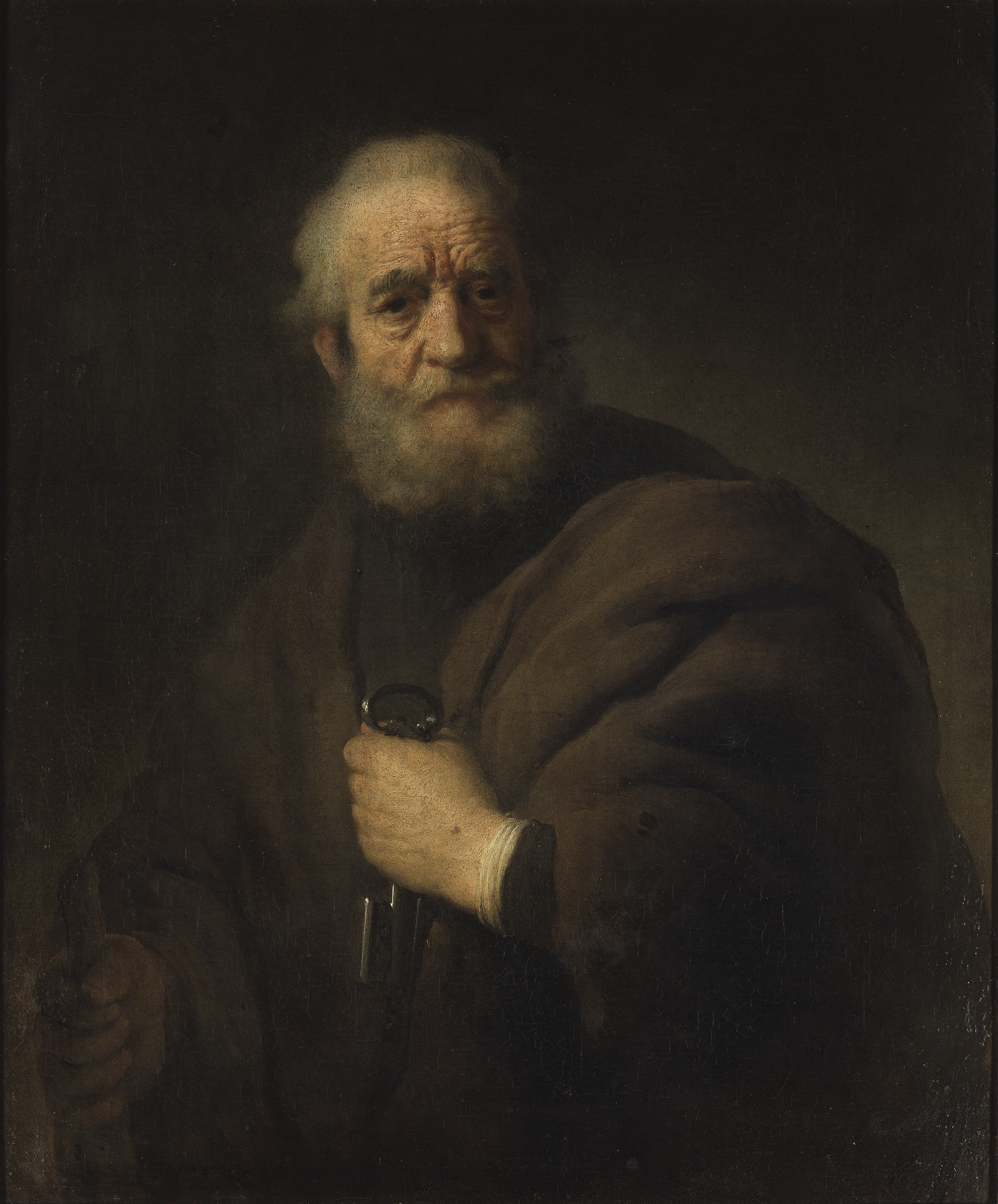
St Peter, portrait by Rembrandt (1632)

The New Testament presents Peter's original name as Simon (/ˈsaɪmən/; Σίμων, Simōn in Greek). In only two passages, his name is instead spelled "Simeon" (Συμεών in Greek). The variation possibly reflects "the well-known custom among Jews at the time of giving the name of a famous patriarch or personage of the Old Testament to a male child [i.e., Simeon], along with a similar-sounding Greek/Roman name [in this case, Simon]".

He was later given by Jesus the name Cephas (/ˈsiːfəs/), from the Aramaic כֵּיפָא, Kepha, 'rock/stone'. In translations of the Bible from the original Greek, his name is maintained as Cephas in nine occurrences in the New Testament, whereas in the vast majority of mentions (156 occurrences in the New Testament), he is called Πέτρος, Petros, a masculinized form derived from the root of πέτρα (petra), adapted to serve as a masculine proper name.

The precise meaning of the Aramaic word is disputed, some saying that the usual meaning is "rock" or "crag", others saying that it means rather "stone" and, particularly in its application by Jesus to Simon, like a "jewel", but most scholars agree that as a proper name, it denotes a rough or tough character. Both meanings, "stone" (jewel or hewn stone) and "rock", are indicated in dictionaries of Aramaic and Syriac.

Catholic theologian Rudolf Pesch argues that the Aramaic word would mean "precious stone" to designate a distinguished person. This cannot be sufficiently proven from Aramaic, however, since the use of the Aramaic root kp as a personal name has not been proven, and there are hardly any known examples of the word being used to mean "precious stone".

The combined name Σίμων Πέτρος (Símon Pétros, Simon Peter) appears 19 times in the New Testament. In some Syriac documents, he is called, in English translation, Simon Cephas.

== Biographical information ==
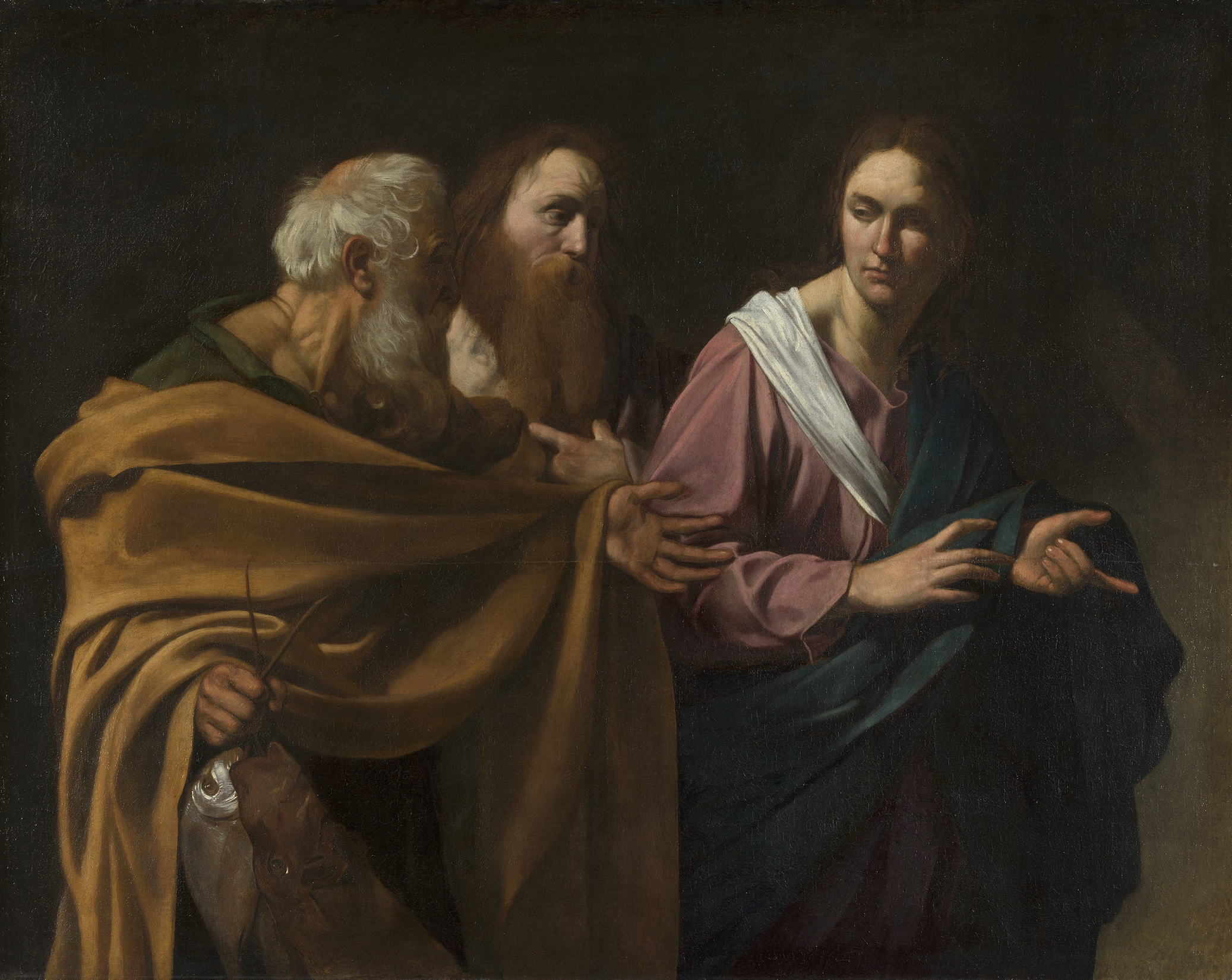
The Calling of Saints Peter and Andrew, 1603–1606, Caravaggio

=== Sources ===
The sources used to reconstruct the life of Peter can be divided in three groups:

- the New Testament writings, such as the Pauline Epistles (where Paul the Apostle calls him "Cephas" and "Peter"), the Petrine Epistles (traditionally attributed to him, but their authorship is disputed), the Canonical Gospels and the Acts of the Apostles;
- the New Testament apocrypha attributed to him, such as the Gospel of Peter, the Preaching of Peter, the Acts of Peter, the Acts of Peter and Andrew, the Acts of Peter and the Twelve, the Acts of Peter and Paul, the Letter of Peter to Philip, the Letter of Peter to James the Just, the Apocalypse of Peter and the Coptic Apocalypse of Peter. Scholars agree that these are late pseudepigrapha with little historical value, though they may contain some historical kernel;
- the writing of the Apostolic Fathers and the Church Fathers, such as Papias of Hierapolis, Pope Clement I, Polycarp, Ignatius of Antioch and Ireneus.

In the New Testament, he is among the first (Note: The narrative of Jesus' calling of his first disciples varies throughout all four gospels. In Mark 1:16, "Simon and his brother Andrew" are the first to be called; in Matthew 4:18, "Simon, who is called Peter, and Andrew his brother" are also the first to be called; and in Luke 5:1–11, Simon Peter, alongside "James and John, sons of Zebedee, who were partners with Simon", are the first to be called. The narrative in the Gospel of John deviates from the narrative in the three Synoptic Gospels; in John 1:40–42, Andrew is the first disciple, and later brings Simon to Jesus, who names him Cephas (translated as Peter).) of the disciples called during Jesus' ministry. Peter became the first listed apostle ordained by Jesus in the early Church.

=== Accounts ===
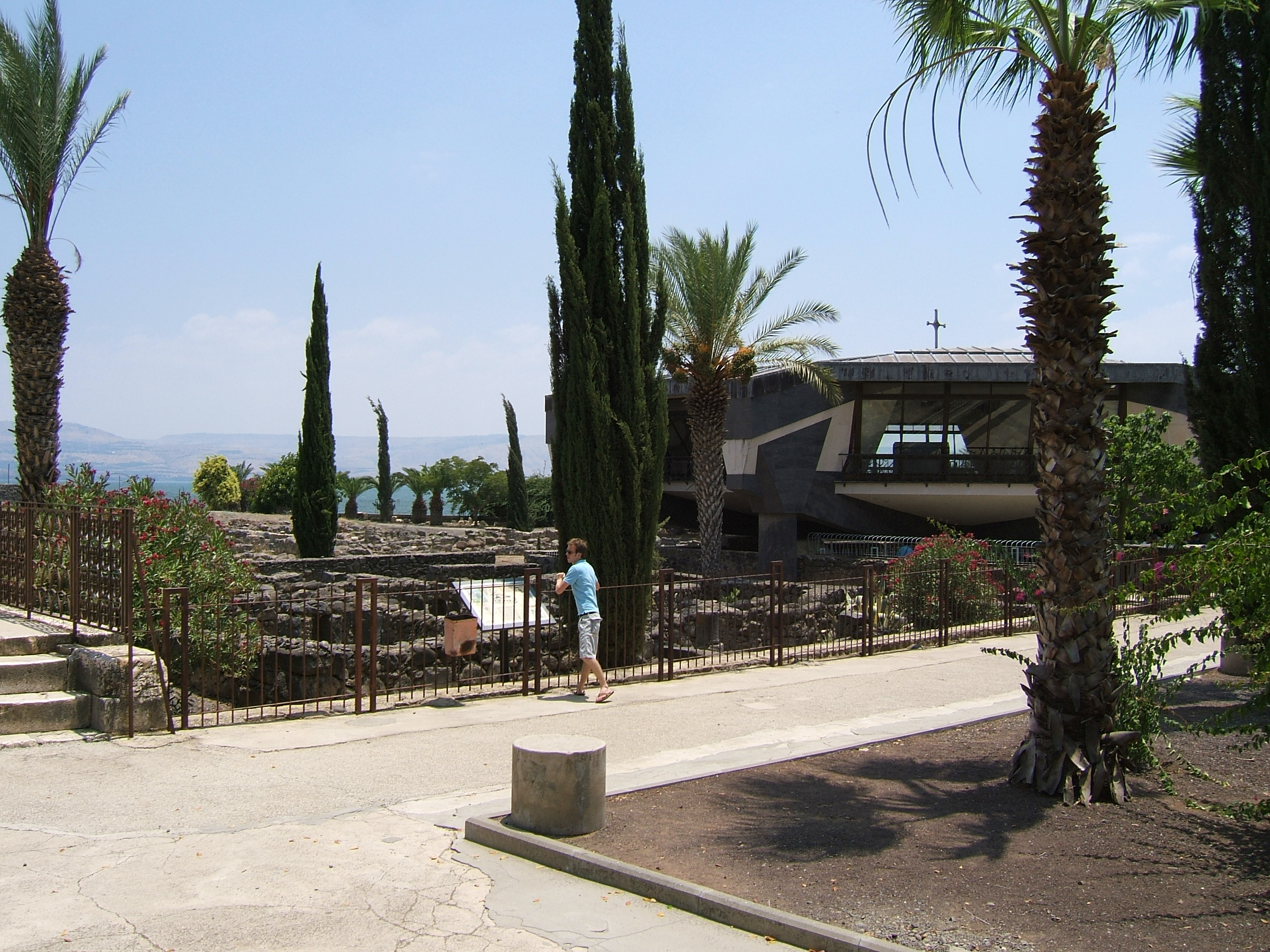
St. Peter's Church, Capernaum on the north side of the Sea of Galilee. A Franciscan church is built upon the traditional site of Apostle Peter's house.

Peter was a Jewish fisherman born in Bethsaida. He was named Simon, the son of a man named Jonah or John. (Note: His father's name is given as "Jonah" although some manuscripts of John give his father's name as "John".) The three Synoptic Gospels recount how Peter's mother-in-law was healed by Jesus at their home in Capernaum; these passages depict Peter as being married or widowed. First Corinthians 9:5 has also been taken to imply that he was married.

In the synoptic gospels, Peter (then Simon) was a fisherman along with his brother Andrew and the sons of Zebedee, James and John. The Gospel of John also depicts Peter fishing, even after the resurrection of Jesus, in the story of the catch of 153 fish. In Matthew and Mark, Jesus called Simon and his brother Andrew to be "fishers of men".

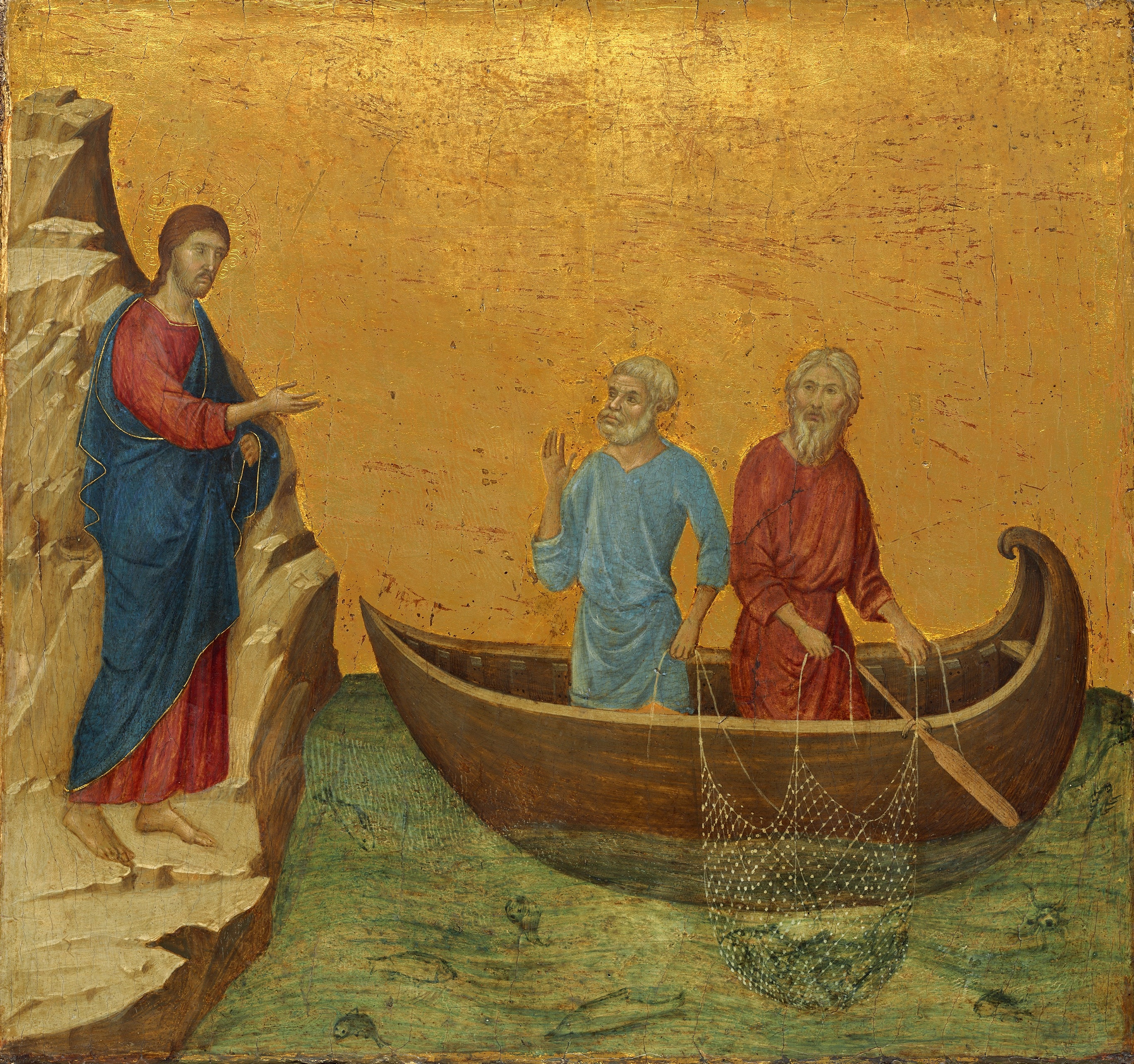
The Calling of the Apostles Peter and Andrew (from the Maestà), by Duccio, c. 1308 – c. 1311

In the Confession of Peter, he proclaims Jesus to be the Christ (Jewish Messiah), as described in the three synoptic gospels. It is there, in the area of Caesarea Philippi, that he receives from Jesus the name Cephas (Aramaic Kepha), or Peter (Greek Petros).

In Luke, Simon Peter owns the boat that Jesus uses to preach to the multitudes who are pressing on him at the shore of Lake Gennesaret. Jesus then amazes Simon and his companions, James and John (Andrew is not mentioned) by telling them to lower their nets, whereupon they catch a huge number of fish. Immediately after this, they follow him.

The Gospel of John gives a comparable account of "The First Disciples". In John, the readers are told that it was two disciples of John the Baptist (Andrew and an unnamed disciple) who heard John the Baptist announce Jesus as the "Lamb of God" and then followed Jesus. Andrew then goes to his brother Simon, saying, "We have found the Messiah", and then brings Simon to Jesus, who immediately names him as "Cephas".

Three of the four Gospels—Matthew, Mark, and John – recount the story of Jesus walking on water. Matthew additionally describes Peter walking on water for a moment but beginning to sink when his faith wavers.

At the beginning of the Last Supper, Jesus washed his disciples' feet. Peter initially refused to let Jesus wash his feet, but when Jesus told him: "If I wash thee not, thou hast no part with me", Peter replied: "Lord, not my feet only, but also my hands and my head". The washing of feet is often repeated in the service of worship on Maundy Thursday by some Christian denominations.

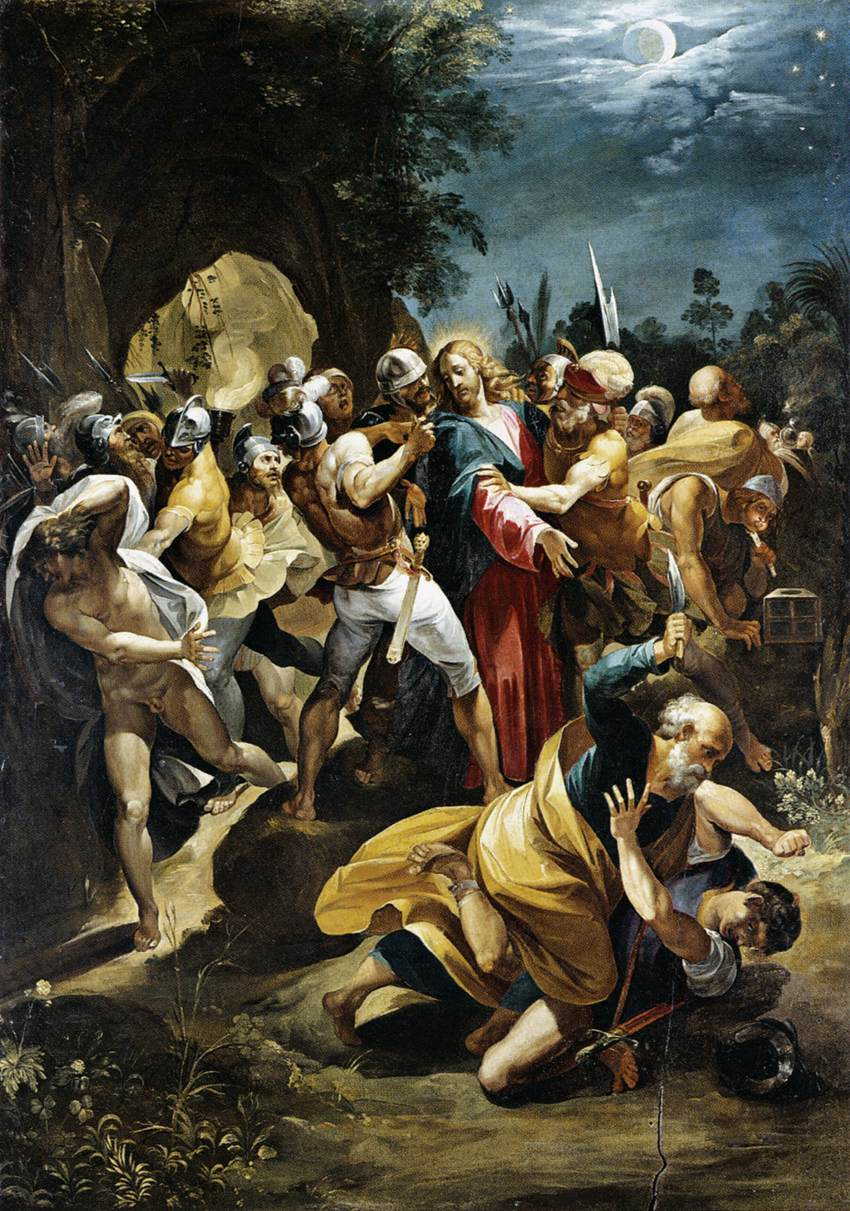
Apostle Peter striking the High Priests' servant Malchus with a sword in the Garden of Gethsemane, by Giuseppe Cesari, c. 1597

The three synoptic gospels all mention that, when Jesus was arrested, one of his companions cut off the ear of a servant of the High Priest of Israel. The Gospel of John also includes this event and names Peter as the swordsman and Malchus as the victim. Luke adds that Jesus touched the ear and miraculously healed it. This healing of the servant's ear is the last of the 37 miracles attributed to Jesus in the Bible.

Simon Peter was twice arraigned, along with John, before the Sanhedrin and directly defied them. Peter took a missionary journey to Lydda, Joppa, and Caesarea. At Joppa, Peter had a vision given to him from God which allowed the eating of previously unclean animals, leading the early believers to the decision to evangelise the Gentiles. Simon Peter applied the message of the vision on clean animals to the gentiles and follows his meeting with Cornelius the Centurion by claiming that "God shows no partiality".

According to the Acts of the Apostles, Peter and John were sent from Jerusalem to Samaria. Peter/Cephas is mentioned briefly in the opening chapter of one of the Pauline epistles, Epistle to the Galatians, which mentions a trip by Paul the Apostle to Jerusalem where he meets Peter. Peter features again in Galatians, fourteen years later, when Paul (now with Barnabas and Titus) returned to Jerusalem. When Peter came to Antioch, Paul opposed Peter to his face "because he [Peter] was in the wrong". (Note: See Incident at Antioch; see also the section below headed "Road to Rome: Antioch and Corinth".)

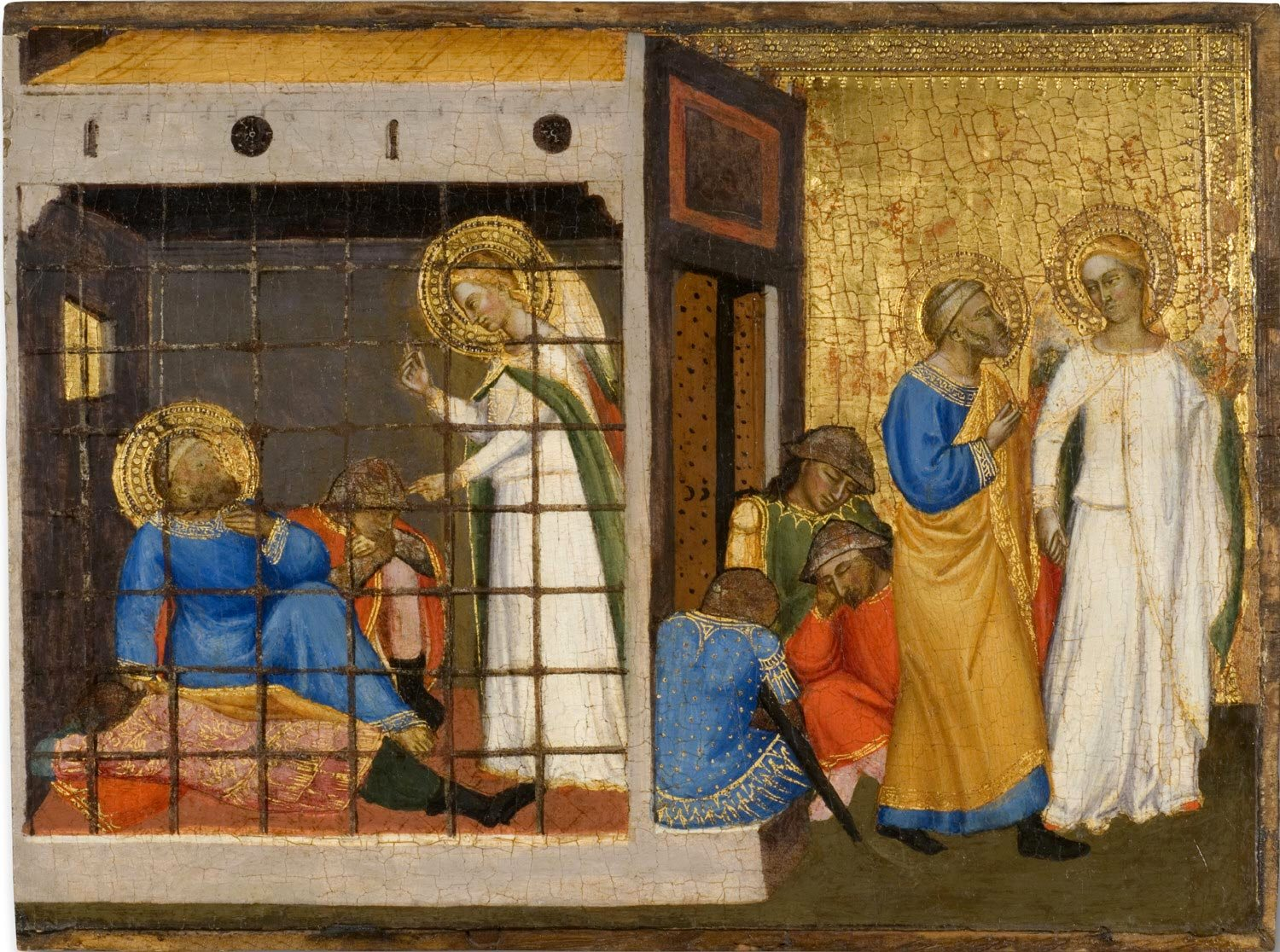
The Liberation of Saint Peter from Prison, Jacopo di Cione, 1370–1371 (Philadelphia Museum of Art)

Acts 12 narrates how Peter, who was in Jerusalem, was imprisoned by Herod Agrippa (reigned AD 42–44) but was rescued by an angel. After his liberation (see Liberation of Peter) Peter left Jerusalem to go to "another place". Concerning Peter's subsequent activity there is no further connected information from the extant sources, although there are short notices of certain individual episodes of his later life.

=== Peter's wife ===
The synoptic gospels mention that Peter had a mother-in-law at the time he joined Jesus and that Jesus healed Peter's mother-in-law. However, the gospels give no information about his wife. Clement of Alexandria claimed that Peter's wife was executed for her faith by the Roman authorities but he did not specify any date or location. Another opinion states that Peter's wife was no longer alive at the time he met Jesus, so he was a widower.

== First leader of the early Church ==
The Gospels and Acts portray Peter as the most prominent apostle, though he denied Jesus three times during the events of the crucifixion. According to the Christian tradition, Peter was the first disciple to whom Jesus appeared, balancing Peter's denial and restoring his position. Peter is regarded as the first leader of the early Church, though he was soon eclipsed in this leadership by James the Just, "the brother of the Lord". Because Peter was the first to whom Jesus appeared, the leadership of Peter forms the basis of the Apostolic succession and the institutional power of orthodoxy, as the heirs of Peter, and he is described as "the rock" on which the church will be built.

=== Position among the apostles ===
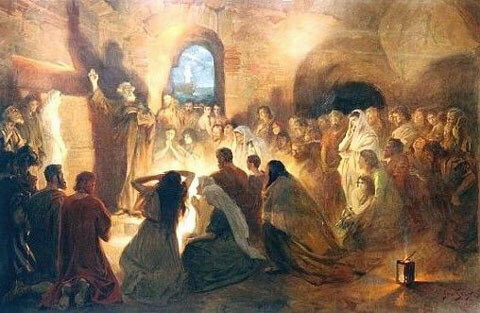
St. Peter Preaching the Gospel in the Catacombs by Jan Styka

Peter is always listed first among the Twelve Apostles in the Gospels and in the Book of Acts. Along with James the Elder and John he formed an informal triumvirate within the Twelve Apostles. Jesus allowed them to be the only apostles present at three particular occasions during his public ministry, the Raising of Jairus' daughter, Transfiguration of Jesus and Agony in the Garden of Gethsemane. Peter often confesses his faith in Jesus as the Messiah.

Peter is often depicted in the gospels as spokesman of all the Apostles. John Vidmar, a Catholic scholar, writes: "Catholic scholars agree that Peter had an authority that superseded that of the other apostles. Peter is their spokesman at several events, he conducts the election of Matthias, his opinion in the debate over converting Gentiles was crucial, etc".

The author of the Acts of the Apostles portrays Peter as the central figure within the early Christian community. (Note: Peter delivering a significant open-air sermon during Pentecost. According to the same book, Peter took the lead in selecting a replacement for Judas Iscariot. Following this appointment, we see Peter establish the conditions for being an apostle as those who have spent time with Jesus. Peter's authority lent to his role as an adjudicator in conflicts and moral matters. He takes on this role in the case of Ananias and Sapphira and holds them accountable for lying about their alms-giving. Peter passes judgement upon them and they are individually struck dead over the infraction. Peter's role wasn't always leadership, since he also employed his gifts for taking care of those in need. We see Peter establish these trends by reaching out to the sick and lame. Peter heals two individuals who cannot walk or are paralysed as well as raising Tabitha from the dead. While these acts were miracles of compassion, they also contributed to the number of believers in the early Church.)

=== Denial of Jesus by Peter ===
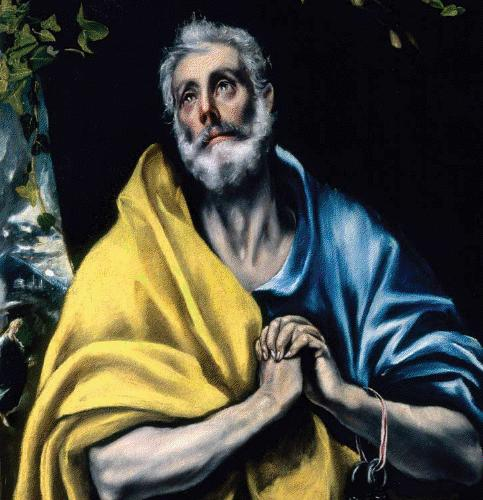
The tears of Saint Peter, by El Greco, late 16th century

All four canonical gospels recount that, during the Last Supper, Jesus foretold that Peter would deny him three times before the following cockcrow ("before the cock crows twice" in Mark's account). The three Synoptics and John describe the three denials as follows:

1. A denial when a female servant of the high priest spots Simon Peter, saying that he had been with Jesus. According to Mark (but not in all manuscripts), "the rooster crowed". Only Luke and John mention a fire by which Peter was warming himself among other people: according to Luke, Peter was "sitting"; according to John, he was "standing";
2. A denial when Simon Peter had gone out to the gateway, away from the firelight, but the same servant girl (per Mark) or another servant girl (per Matthew) or a man (per Luke and also John, for whom, though, this is the third denial) told the bystanders he was a follower of Jesus. According to John, "the rooster crowed". The Gospel of John places the second denial while Peter was still warming himself at the fire and gives as the occasion of the third denial a claim by someone to have seen him in the garden of Gethsemane when Jesus was arrested;
3. A denial came when Peter's Galilean accent was taken as proof that he was indeed a disciple of Jesus. According to Matthew, Mark and Luke, "the rooster crowed". Matthew adds that it was his accent that gave him away as coming from Galilee. Luke deviates slightly from this by stating that, rather than a crowd accusing Simon Peter, it was a third individual. John does not mention the Galilean accent.

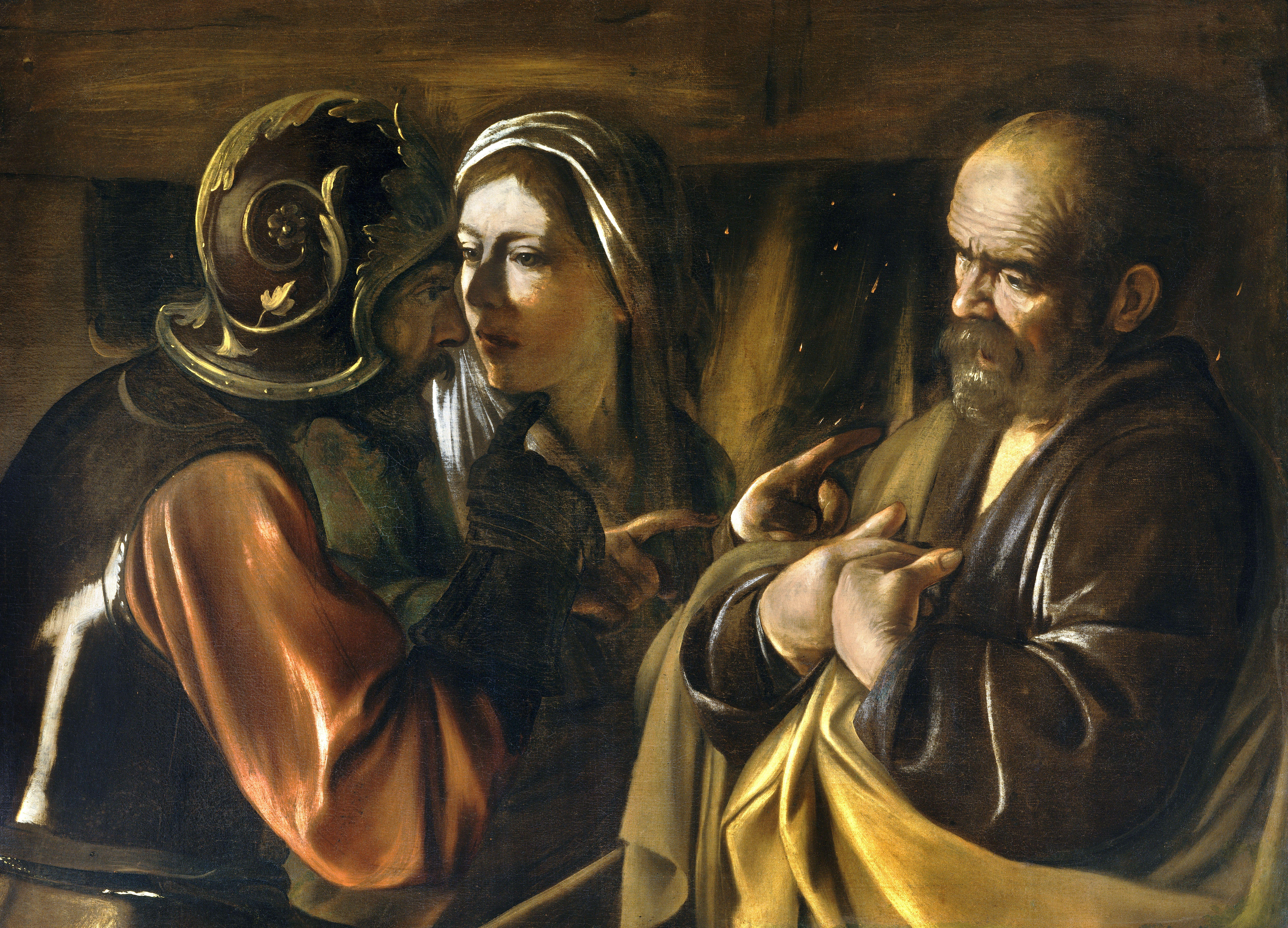
The Denial of Saint Peter, by Caravaggio, c. 1610

In the Gospel of Luke is a record of Christ telling Peter: "Simon, Simon, behold, Satan hath desired to have you, that he may sift you as wheat: but I have prayed for thee, that thy faith fail not: and when thou art converted, strengthen thy brethren". In a reminiscent scene in John's epilogue, Peter affirms three times that he loves Jesus.

=== Resurrection appearances ===
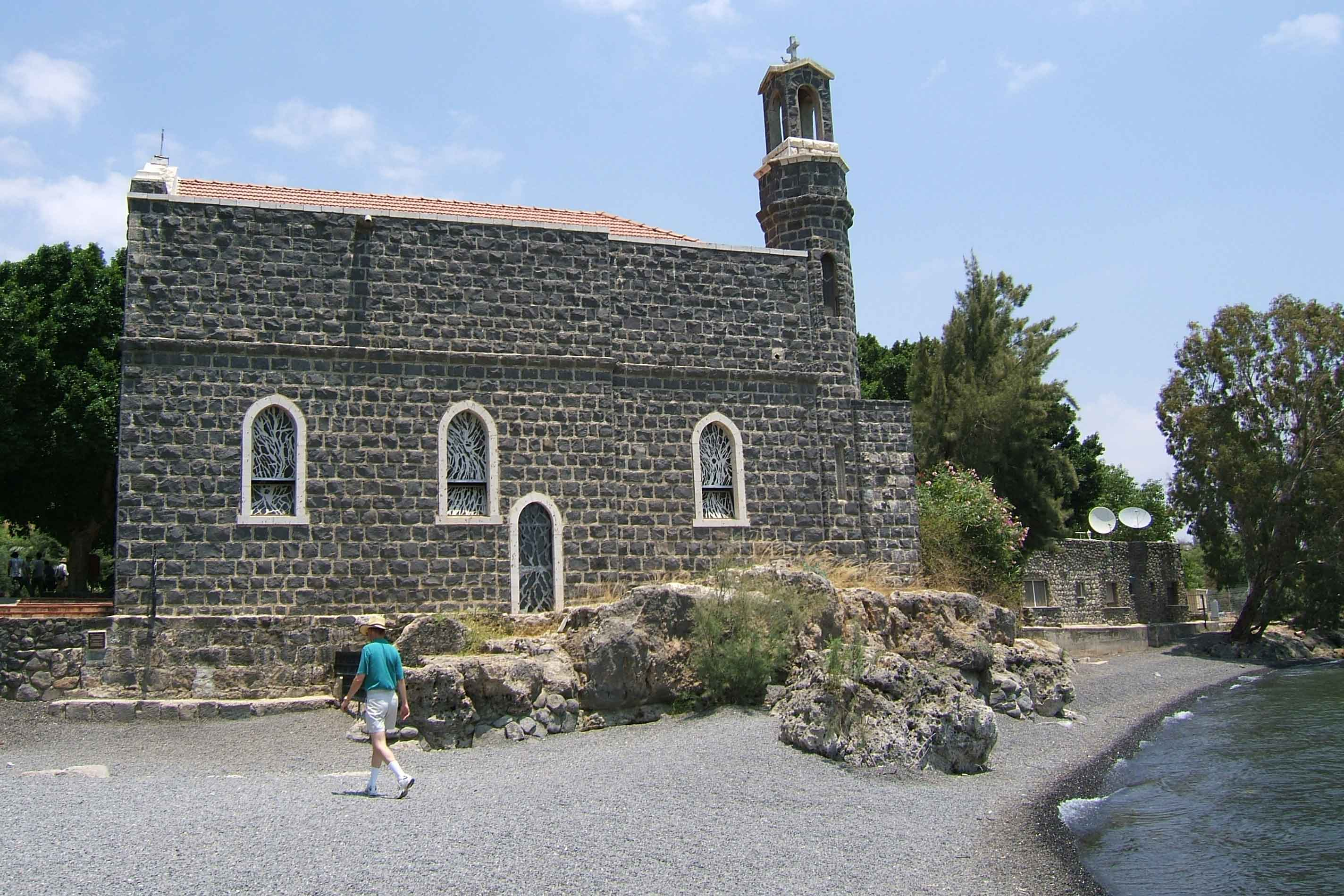
The Church of the Primacy of St. Peter on the Sea of Galilee

Paul's First Epistle to the Corinthians contains a list of resurrection appearances of Jesus, the first of which is an appearance to Peter. Here, Paul apparently follows an early tradition that Peter was the first to see the risen Christ, which, however, did not seem to have survived to the time when the gospels were written.

In John's gospel, Peter is the first person to enter the empty tomb, although the women and the beloved disciple see it before him. In Luke's account, the women's report of the empty tomb is dismissed by the apostles, and Peter is the only one who goes to check for himself, running to the tomb. After seeing the graveclothes, he goes home, apparently without informing the other disciples.

In the final chapter of the Gospel of John, Peter, in one of the resurrection appearances of Jesus, three times affirmed his love for Jesus, balancing his threefold denial, and Jesus reconfirmed Peter's position. The Church of the Primacy of St. Peter on the Sea of Galilee is seen as the traditional site where Jesus Christ appeared to his disciples after his resurrection and, according to Catholic tradition, established Peter's supreme jurisdiction over the Christian church.

=== Leader of the early Church ===
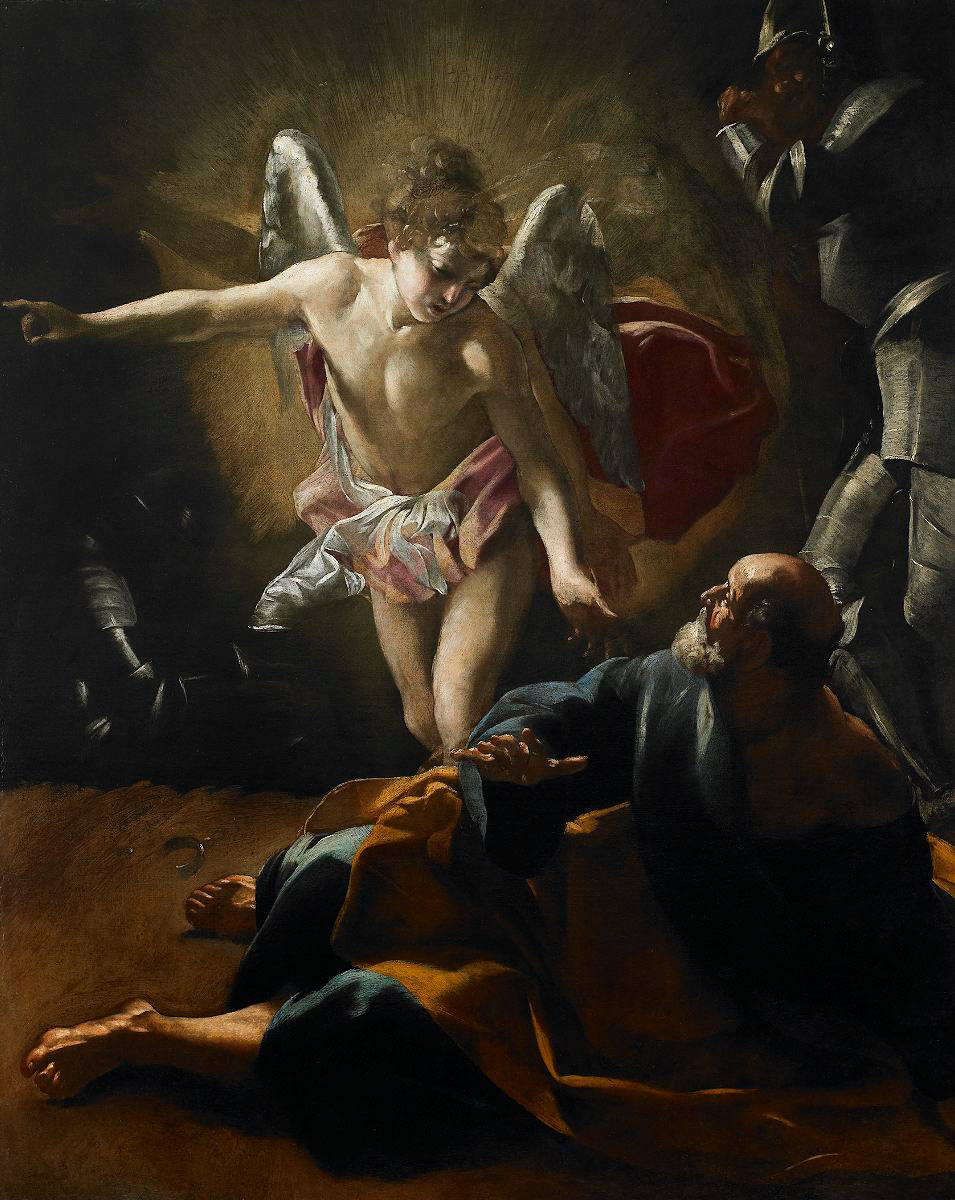
The Liberation of St. Peter from prison by an angel, by Giovanni Lanfranco, 1620–1621

Peter was considered along with James the Just and John the Apostle as the three Pillars of the Church. Legitimised by Jesus' appearance, Peter assumed leadership of the group of early followers, forming the Jerusalem ekklēsia mentioned by Paul. He was soon eclipsed in this leadership by James the Just, "the Brother of the Lord". According to Lüdemann, this was due to the discussions about the strictness of adherence to the Jewish Law, when the more conservative faction of James the Just took the overhand over the more liberal position of Peter, who soon lost influence. (Note: At the Council of Jerusalem (c. 50), the early Church, Paul and the leaders of the Jerusalem church met and decided to embrace Gentile converts. Acts portrays Peter and other leaders as successfully opposing the Christian Pharisees who insisted on circumcision.) According to Methodist historian James D. G. Dunn, this was not "usurpation of power", but a consequence of Peter's involvement in missionary activities. The early Church historian Eusebius (c. 325) records Clement of Alexandria (c. 190) as saying:

For they say that Peter and James (the Greater) and John after the ascension of our Saviour, as if also preferred by our Lord, strove not after honor, but chose James the Just bishop of Jerusalem.

Dunn proposes that Peter was a "bridge-man" between the opposing views of Paul and James the Just [italics original]:

For Peter was probably in fact and effect the bridge-man (pontifex maximus!) who did more than any other to hold together the diversity of first-century Christianity. James the brother of Jesus and Paul, the two other most prominent leading figures in first-century Christianity, were too much identified with their respective "brands" of Christianity, at least in the eyes of Christians at the opposite ends of this particular spectrum.

— Dunn 2001, p. 577, Ch. 32

Paul affirms that Peter had the special charge of being apostle to the Jews, just as he, Paul, was apostle to the Gentiles. Some argue James the Just was bishop of Jerusalem whilst Peter was bishop of Rome and that this position at times gave James privilege in some (but not all) situations.

=== "Rock" dialogue ===
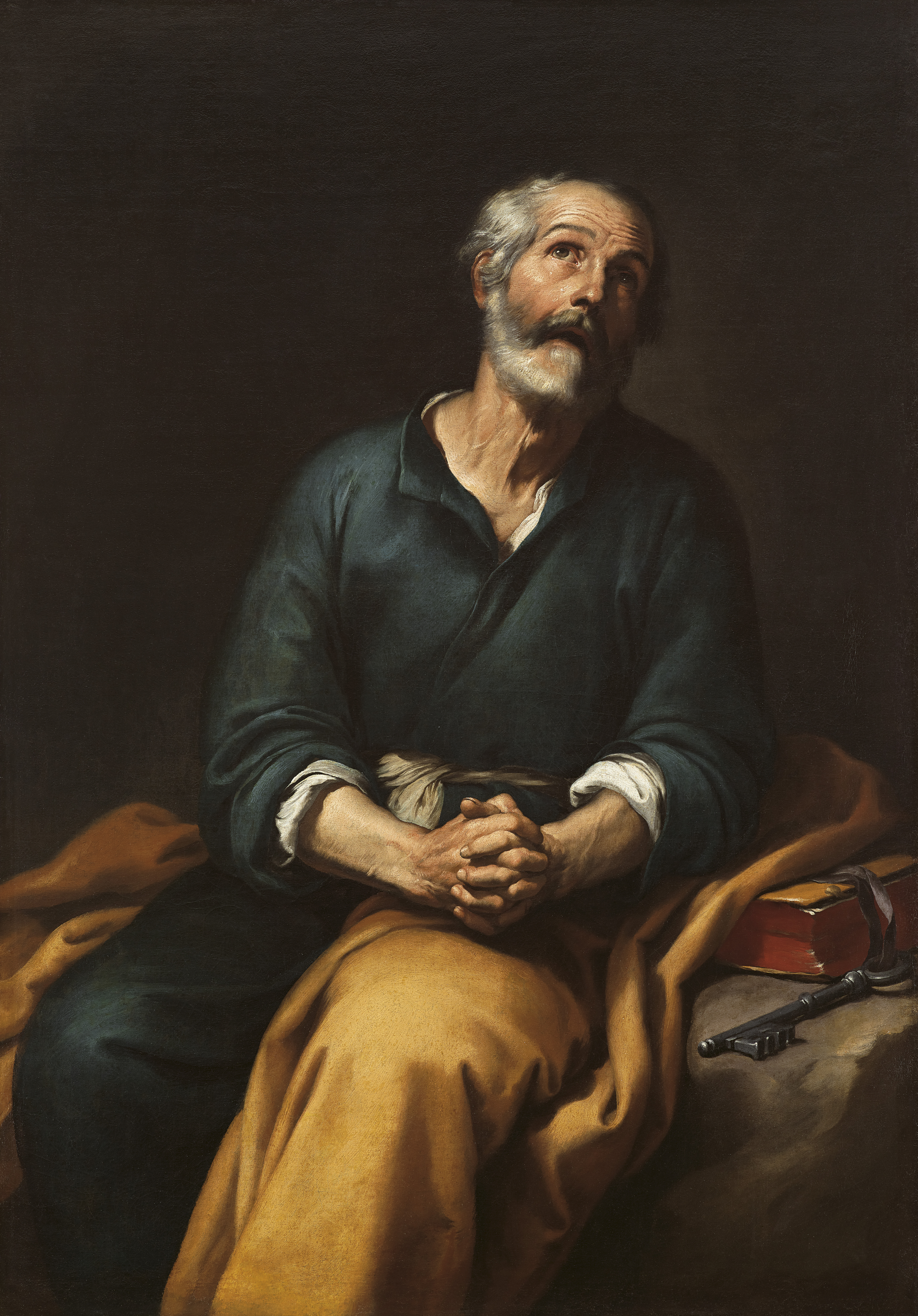
Saint Peter in Tears by Bartolomé Esteban Murillo (1617–1682)

In a dialogue between Jesus and his disciples (Matthew 16:13–19), Jesus asks, "Who do people say that the Son of Man is?" The disciples give various answers. When he asks, "Who do you say that I am?", Simon Peter answers, "You are the Messiah, the Son of the living God". Jesus then declares:

Blessed are you, Simon son of Jonah, for this was not revealed to you by flesh and blood, but by my Father in heaven. And I tell you that you are Cephas (Peter) (Petros), and on this rock (petra) I will build my church, and the gates of Hades will not overcome it. I will give you the keys of the kingdom of heaven; whatever you bind on earth will be bound in heaven, and whatever you loose on earth will be loosed in heaven.

A common view of Peter is provided by Jesuit Father Daniel J. Harrington, who suggests that Peter was an unlikely symbol of stability. While he was one of the first disciples called and was the spokesman for the group, Peter is also the exemplar of "little faith". In Matthew 14, Peter will soon have Jesus say to him, "O you of little faith, why did you doubt?", and he will eventually deny Jesus three times. Thus, in light of the Easter event, Peter became an exemplar of the forgiven sinner. Outside the Catholic Church, opinions vary as to the interpretation of this passage with respect to what authority and responsibility, if any, Jesus was giving to Peter.

In the Eastern Orthodox Church this passage is interpreted as not implying a special prominence to the person of Peter, but to Peter's position as representative of the Apostles. The word used for "rock" (petra) grammatically refers to "a small detachment of the massive ledge", not to a massive boulder. Thus, Orthodox Sacred Tradition understands Jesus' words as referring to the apostolic faith.

Petros had not previously been used as a name, but in the Greek-speaking world it became a popular Christian name after the tradition of Peter's prominence in the early Christian church had been established.

In 1 Corinthians 10:4 Apostle Paul says the spiritual rock (petra) was Christ:

They all ate the same spiritual food and drank the same spiritual drink; for they drank from the spiritual rock that accompanied them, and that rock was Christ (hē petra de ēn ho Christos).

The Matthew-Corinthians connection here is confessed by Jerome's Commentary on Matthew and by Augustine, the "greatest of the Latin fathers":

Let us call to mind the Gospel: "Upon this Rock I will build My Church" (Matthew 16:18). Therefore She cries from the ends of the earth, whom He has willed to be built upon a Rock. But in order that the Church might be built upon the Rock, who was made the Rock? Hear Paul saying: "But the Rock was Christ". On Him therefore built we have been.

=== Apostolic succession ===
Catholic and Orthodox sources argue that the leadership of Peter forms the basis of the Apostolic succession and the institutional power of orthodoxy, as the heirs of Peter. Catholics refer to him as chief of the Apostles, as do the Eastern Orthodox and the Oriental Orthodox. In Coptic Orthodox Church liturgy, he is once referred to as "prominent" or "head" among the Apostles, a title shared with Paul in the text (The Fraction of Fast and Feast of the Apostles Peter and Paul in the Coptic Orthodox Church of Alexandria). Some, including the Orthodox churches, believe this is not the same as saying that the other Apostles were under Peter's orders.

Sources suggest that, at first, the terms episcopos and presbyteros were used interchangeably, with the consensus among scholars being that, by the turn of the 1st and 2nd centuries, local congregations were led by bishops and presbyters, whose duties of office overlapped or were indistinguishable from one another. Protestant and secular historians generally agree that there was probably "no single 'monarchical' bishop in Rome before the middle of the 2nd century ... and likely later".

== Antioch and Corinth ==
=== Antioch ===
According to the Epistle to the Galatians (2:11), Peter went to Antioch where Paul rebuked him for following the conservative line regarding the conversion of Gentiles, having meals separate from Gentiles. (Note: Galatians is accepted as authentic by almost all scholars. These may be the earliest mentions of Peter to be written. Eusebius of Caesarea, in his "Historia Ecclesiastica (I,12:2)" while naming some of the Seventy Disciples of Jesus, says: "This is the account of Clement, in the fifth book of Hypotyposes (AD 190); in which he also says that Cephas was one of the seventy disciples, a man who bore the same name as the apostle Peter, and the one concerning whom Paul says, [When Cephas came to Antioch I withstood him to his face.]" (ἡ δ᾿ ἱστορία παρὰ Κλήμεντι κατὰ τὴν πέμπτην τῶν Ὑποτυπώσεων· ἐν ᾗ καὶ Κηφᾶν, περὶ οὗ φησιν ὁ Παῦλος· "ὅτε δὲ ἦλθεν Κηφᾶς εἰς Ἀντιόχειαν, κατὰ πρόσωπον αὐτῷ ἀντέστην", ἕνα φησὶ γεγονέναι τῶν ἑβδομήκοντα μαθητῶν, ὁμώνυμον Πέτρῳ τυγχάνοντα τῷ ἀποστόλῳ.)) Subsequent tradition held that Peter had been the first Patriarch of Antioch. According to the writings of Origen and Eusebius in his Church History (III, 36) Peter had founded the church of Antioch. (Note: Eusebius of Caesarea (1890) [circa AD 325]. Philip Schaff; Henry Wace; Revised for New Advent by Kevin Knight (eds.). Historia Ecclesiastica (Church History) Book III. Translated by Arthur Cushman McGiffert. Buffalo, NY: Christian Literature Publishing Co. Archived from the original on 9 October 2026. Chapter "36")

Later accounts expand on the brief biblical mention of his visit to Antioch. The Liber Pontificalis (9th century) mentions Peter as having served as bishop of Antioch for seven years and having potentially left his family in the Greek city before his journey to Rome. Claims of direct blood lineage from Simon Peter among the old population of Antioch existed in the 1st century and continue to exist today, notably by certain Semaan families of modern-day Syria and Lebanon. Historians have furnished other evidence of Peter's sojourn in Antioch. (Note: This is provided in Downey, A History of Antioch, pp. 583–586. This evidence is accepted by M. Lapidge, among others, see Bischoff and Lapidge, Biblical Commentaries from the Canterbury School (Cambridge, 1994) p. 16. Lastly, see Finegan, The Archaeology of the New Testament, pp. 63–71.)

The Clementine literature, a group of related works written in the fourth century but believed to contain materials from earlier centuries, relates information about Peter that may come from earlier traditions. One is that Peter had a group of 12 to 16 followers, whom the Clementine writings name. Another is that it provides an itinerary of Peter's route from Caesarea Maritima to Antioch, where he debated his adversary Simon Magus; during this journey he ordained Zacchaeus as the first bishop of Caesarea and Maro as the first bishop of Tripolis. Historian Fred Lapham suggests the route recorded in the Clementine writings may have been taken from an earlier document mentioned by Epiphanius of Salamis in his Panarion called "The Itinerary of Peter".

=== Corinth ===
Peter may have visited Corinth, where a party of "Cephas" may have existed. First Corinthians suggests that perhaps Peter visited the city of Corinth, located in Greece, during their missions.

Dionysius, bishop of Corinth, in his Epistle to the Roman Church under Pope Soter (AD 165–174), declares that Peter and Paul founded the Church of Rome and the Church of Corinth, that they had lived in Corinth for some time, and finally arrived in Italy where they found death:

You have thus by such an admonition bound together the planting of Peter and of Paul at Rome and Corinth. For both of them planted and likewise taught us in our Corinth. And they taught together in like manner in Italy, and suffered martyrdom at the same time.

== Connection to Rome ==
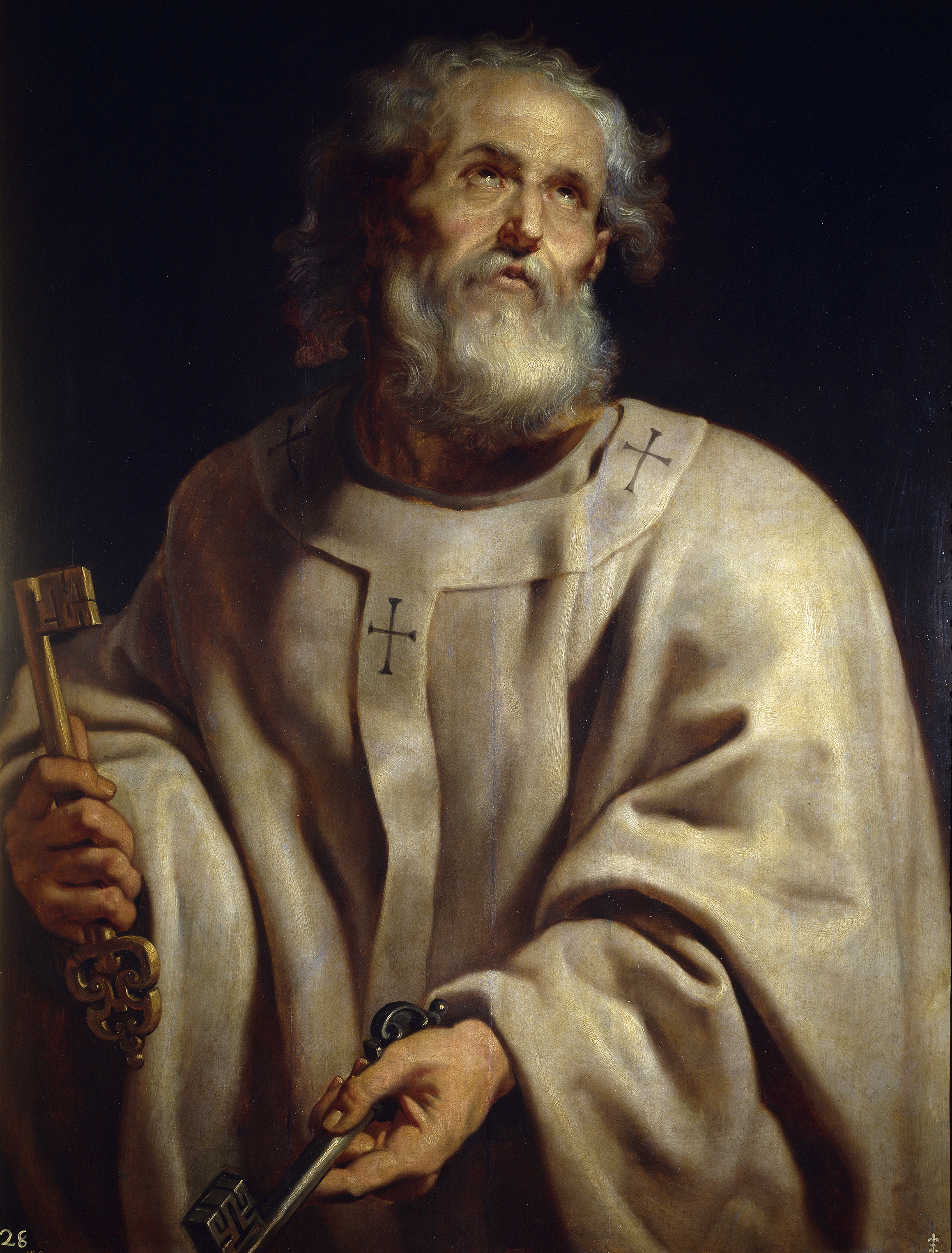
Saint Peter in papal vestments, by Peter Paul Rubens

=== Papacy ===
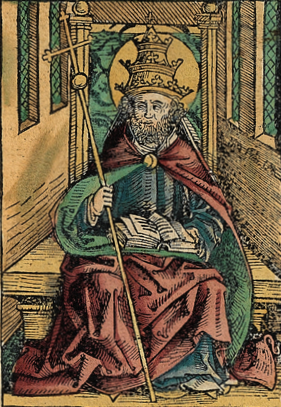
Saint Peter portrayed as a pope in the Nuremberg Chronicle

The Catholic Church speaks of the pope, the bishop of Rome, as the successor of Saint Peter. This is often interpreted to imply that Peter was the first Bishop of Rome. However, it is also said that the institution of the papacy is not dependent on the idea that Peter was Bishop of Rome or even on his ever having been in Rome.

According to book III, chapter 3 of Against Heresies (180 AD) by Irenaeus of Lyons, Linus was named as Peter's successor and is recognised by the Catholic church as the second Bishop of Rome (pope), followed by Anacletus, Clement of Rome, Evaristus, Alexander, Sixtus, Telesphorus, Hyginus, Pius, Anicetus, Soter and Eleutherius.

In his book Church History, Eusebius notes that Linus succeeded Peter as the bishop of the Church in Rome:

As to the rest of his followers, Paul testifies that Crescens was sent to Gaul; but Linus, whom he mentions in the Second Epistle to Timothy as his companion at Rome, was Peter's successor in the episcopate of the church there, as has already been shown.

— Eusebius of Caesarea, Church History, Book III, Chapter 4

According to Tertullian's book Prescription against Heretics, it is stated that Clement was ordained by Peter as the bishop of Rome:

...as also the church of Rome, which makes Clement to have been ordained in like manner by Peter.

— Tertullian, Prescription against Heretics, Chapter 32

Clement of Rome identifies Peter and Paul as the outstanding heroes of the faith.

=== Coming to Rome ===
==== New Testament accounts ====
There is no obvious biblical evidence that Peter was ever in Rome, but the first epistle of Peter does mention that "The church that is at Babylon, elected together with you, saluteth you; and so doth Marcus my son." Most scholars agree that the city alluded to in this verse is Rome, for which Babylon was a common nickname in Jewish and Christian literature at the time, albeit mostly after the destruction of the Temple in AD 70 (after Peter's death).

Paul's Epistle to the Romans, written about AD 57, greets some fifty people in Rome by name, but not Peter whom he knew. There is also no mention of Peter in Rome later during Paul's two-year stay there in Acts 28, about AD 60–62. With regards to the latter, Acts 28 does not specifically mention any of Paul's visitors.

==== Church Fathers ====
The writings of the 1st century Church Father Ignatius of Antioch (c. 35 – c. 107) refer to Peter and Paul giving admonitions to the Romans, which may indicate Peter's presence in Rome.

Irenaeus of Lyons (c. 130 – c. 202) wrote in the 2nd century that Peter and Paul had been the founders of the Church in Rome and had appointed Linus as succeeding bishop.

Clement of Alexandria (c. 150 – c. 215) states that "Peter had preached the Word publicly at Rome (AD 190)".

According to Origen (184–253) and Eusebius, Peter "after having first founded the church at Antioch, went away to Rome preaching the Gospel, and he also, after [presiding over] the church in Antioch, presided over that of Rome until his death". After presiding over the church in Antioch for a while, Peter would have been succeeded by Evodius and thereafter by Ignatius, who was a disciple of John the Apostle.

Lactantius, in his book called Of the Manner in Which the Persecutors Died, written around 318, noted that "and while Nero reigned, the Apostle Peter came to Rome, and, through the power of God committed unto him, wrought certain miracles, and, by turning many to the true religion, built up a faithful and stedfast temple unto the Lord."

==== Simon Magus ====
Eusebius of Caesarea (260/265 – 339/340) relates that when Peter confronts Simon Magus at Judea (mentioned in Acts 8), Simon Magus flees to Rome, where the Romans began to regard him as a god. According to Eusebius, his luck did not last long, since God sent Peter to Rome, and Simon was quenched and immediately destroyed.

According to Jerome (327–420): "Peter went to Rome in the second year of Claudius to overthrow Simon Magus, and held the sacerdotal chair there for twenty-five years until the last, that is the fourteenth, year of Nero."

An apocryphal work, the Actus Vercellenses (7th century), a Latin text preserved in only one manuscript copy published widely in translation under the title Acts of Peter, sets Peter's confrontation with Simon Magus in Rome.

=== Death and burial ===
==== Crucifixion at Rome ====
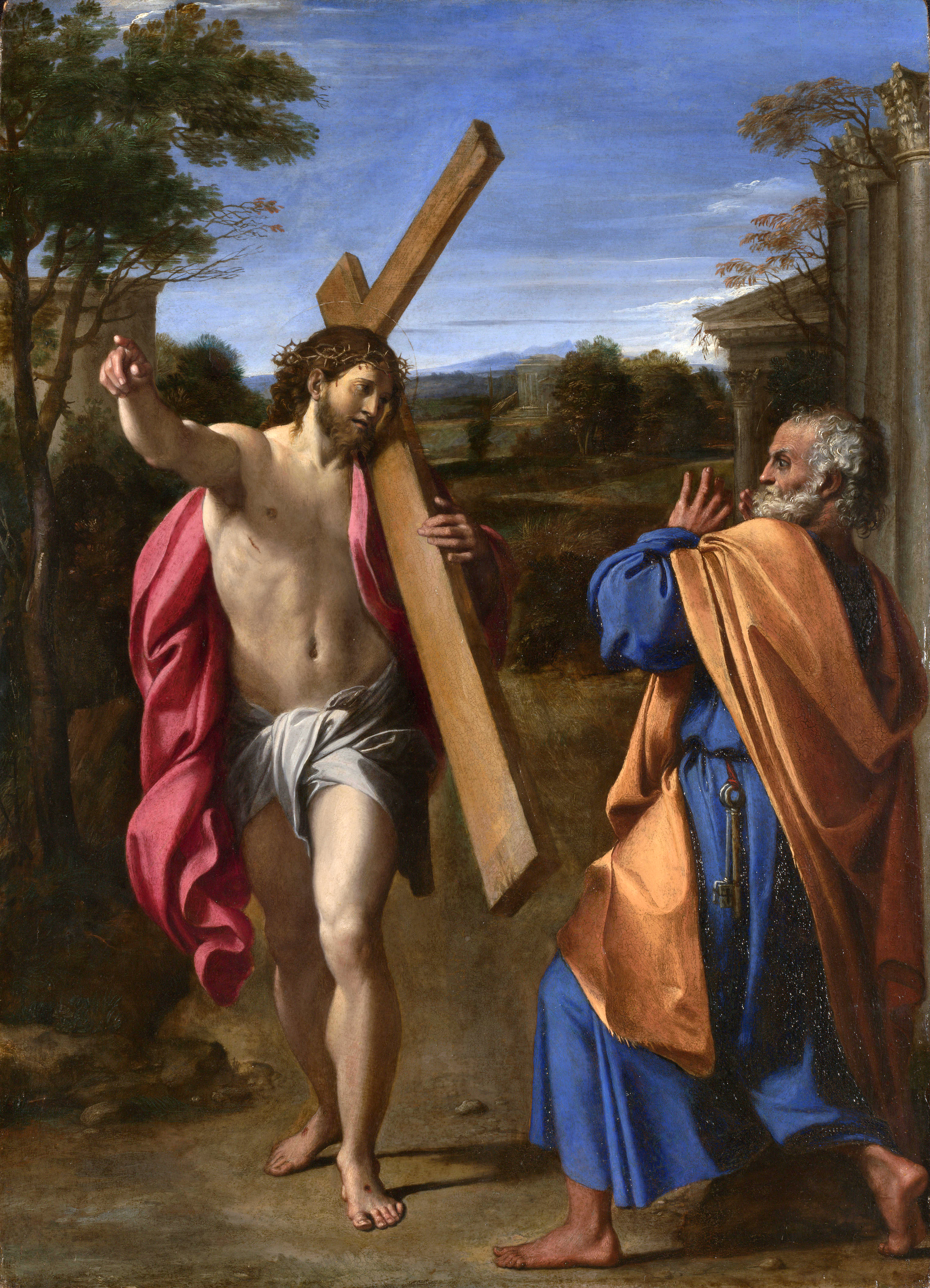
Domine quo vadis? (1602) by Annibale Carracci

In the epilogue of the Gospel of John, Jesus is presented as hinting at Peter's death: "But when you grow old, you will stretch out your hands, and someone else will fasten a belt around you and take you where you do not wish to go." This is interpreted by some as a reference to Peter's crucifixion. Unitarian theologian Donald Fay Robinson has suggested that the incident in Acts 12:1–17, where Peter is "released by an angel" and goes to "another place", really represents an idealised account of his death, which may have occurred in a Jerusalem prison as early as AD 44.

Early church tradition says that Peter died by crucifixion (with arms outstretched) at the time of the Great Fire of Rome in the year 64. This probably took place three months after the disastrous fire that destroyed Rome for which the emperor Nero wished to blame the Christians. This "dies imperii" (regnal day anniversary) was an important one, exactly ten years after Nero ascended to the throne, and it was accompanied by much bloodshed as was usual for important feasts and anniversaries of the emperor. Traditionally, Roman authorities sentenced him to death by crucifixion at Vatican Hill. According to the apocryphal Acts of Peter, he was crucified head down. Tradition locates his burial place where the Basilica of Saint Peter was later built, directly beneath the Basilica's high altar.

Pope Clement I (died 99), in his Letter to the Corinthians (Chapter 5), written c. 80–98, speaks of Peter's martyrdom in the following terms: "Let us take the noble examples of our own generation. Through jealousy and envy the greatest and most just pillars of the Church were persecuted and came even unto death. [...] Peter, through unjust envy, endured not one or two but many labours, and at last, having delivered his testimony, departed unto the place of glory due to him".

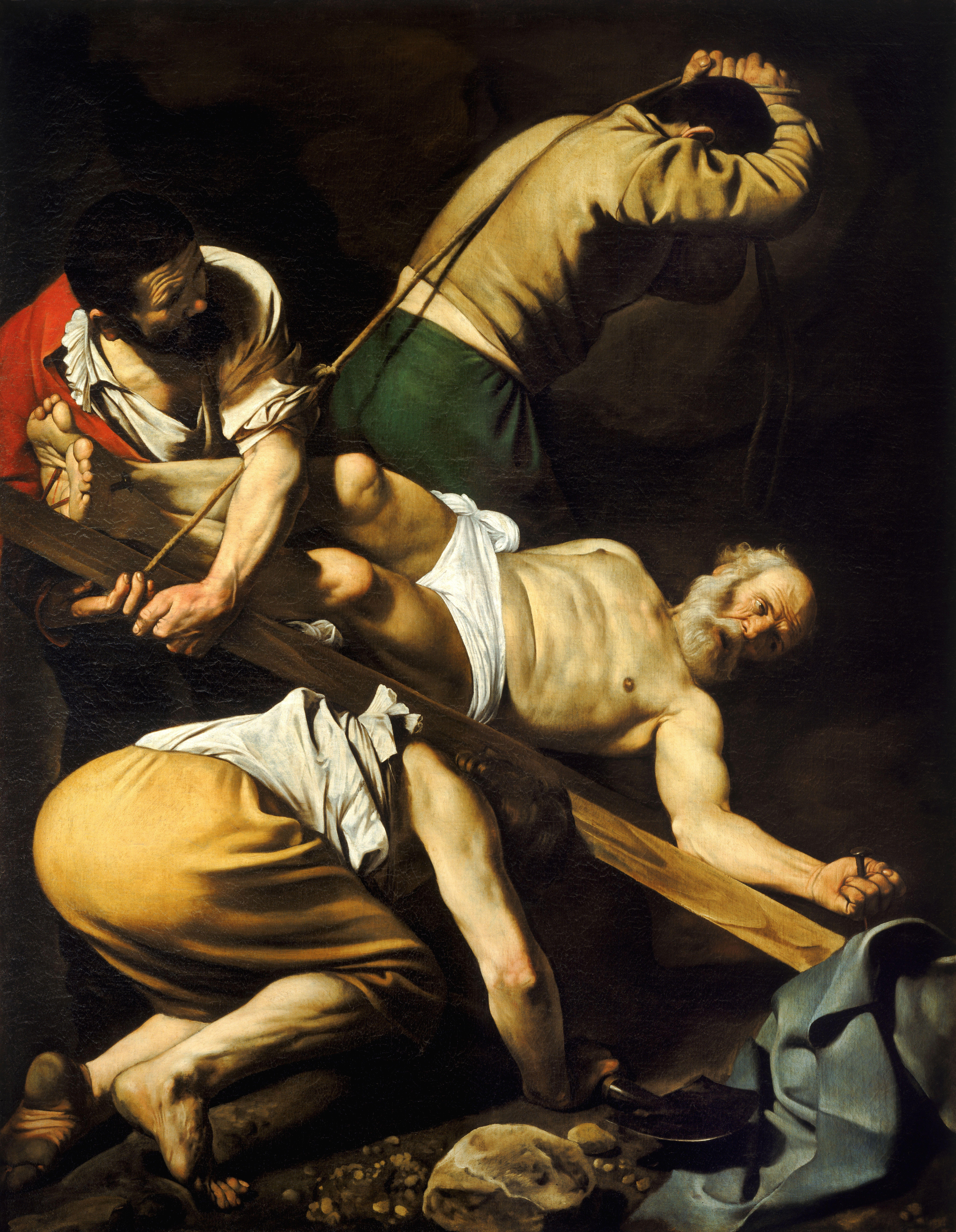
The Crucifixion of Saint Peter (1601) by Caravaggio

The apocryphal Acts of Peter (2nd cent.) (Vercelli Acts XXXV) is the source for the tradition about the famous Latin phrase "Quo vadis, Domine?" (in Greek: Κύριε, ποῦ ὑπάγεις "Kyrie, pou hypageis?"), which means "Where are you going, Lord?". According to the story, Peter, fleeing Rome to avoid execution meets the risen Jesus. In the Latin translation, Peter asks Jesus, "Quo vadis?" He replies, "Romam eo iterum crucifigi" ("I am going to Rome to be crucified again"). Peter then gains the courage to continue his ministry and returns to the city, where he is martyred. This story is commemorated in an Annibale Carracci painting. The Church of Quo Vadis, near the Catacombs of Saint Callistus, contains a stone in which Jesus' footprints from this event are supposedly preserved, though this was apparently an ex-voto from a pilgrim, and indeed a copy of the original housed in the Basilica of St Sebastian.

The death of Peter is attested to by Tertullian (c. 155 – c. 240) at the end of the 2nd century in his Prescription Against Heretics, noting that Peter endured a passion like his Lord's: "How happy is that church [...] where Peter endured a passion like that of the Lord, where Paul was crowned in a death like John's". The statement implies that Peter was killed like Jesus (by crucifixion) and Paul was killed like John (by beheading). It gives the impression that Peter also died in Rome since Paul also died there. In his work Scorpiace 15, he also speaks of Peter's crucifixion: "The budding faith Nero first made bloody in Rome. There Peter was girded by another, since he was bound to the cross."

Origen (184–253) in his Commentary on the Book of Genesis III, quoted by Eusebius in his Ecclesiastical History (III, 1), said: "Peter was crucified at Rome with his head downwards, as he himself had desired to suffer." The Cross of St. Peter inverts the Latin cross based on this refusal, and on his claim of being unworthy to die the same way as his saviour.

Peter of Alexandria (d. 311), who was bishop of Alexandria and died around AD 311, wrote an epistle on Penance, in which he says: "Peter, the first of the apostles, having been often apprehended and thrown into prison, and treated with ignominy, was last of all crucified at Rome."

Jerome (327–420) wrote that "at Nero's hands Peter received the crown of martyrdom being nailed to the cross with his head towards the ground and his feet raised on high, asserting that he was unworthy to be crucified in the same manner as his Lord".

According to Jerome and Eusebius, Peter died in the year AD 67–68, twenty-five years after his arrival in Rome in AD 42. Some modern scholars argue for a date between the years AD 64–68. The Liber Pontificalis also gives him a tenure of 25 years, and adds that he died in the 38th year after the death of Jesus, which, reckoning from AD 30, also gives AD 67–68. However, it also explicitly states that Pope Linus succeeded him in the year AD 56, which is the result of mixing two contradictory traditions.

In a 2025 paper, one scholar suggests that Paul and Peter's deaths may have been due to intra-community violence.

==== Burial ====
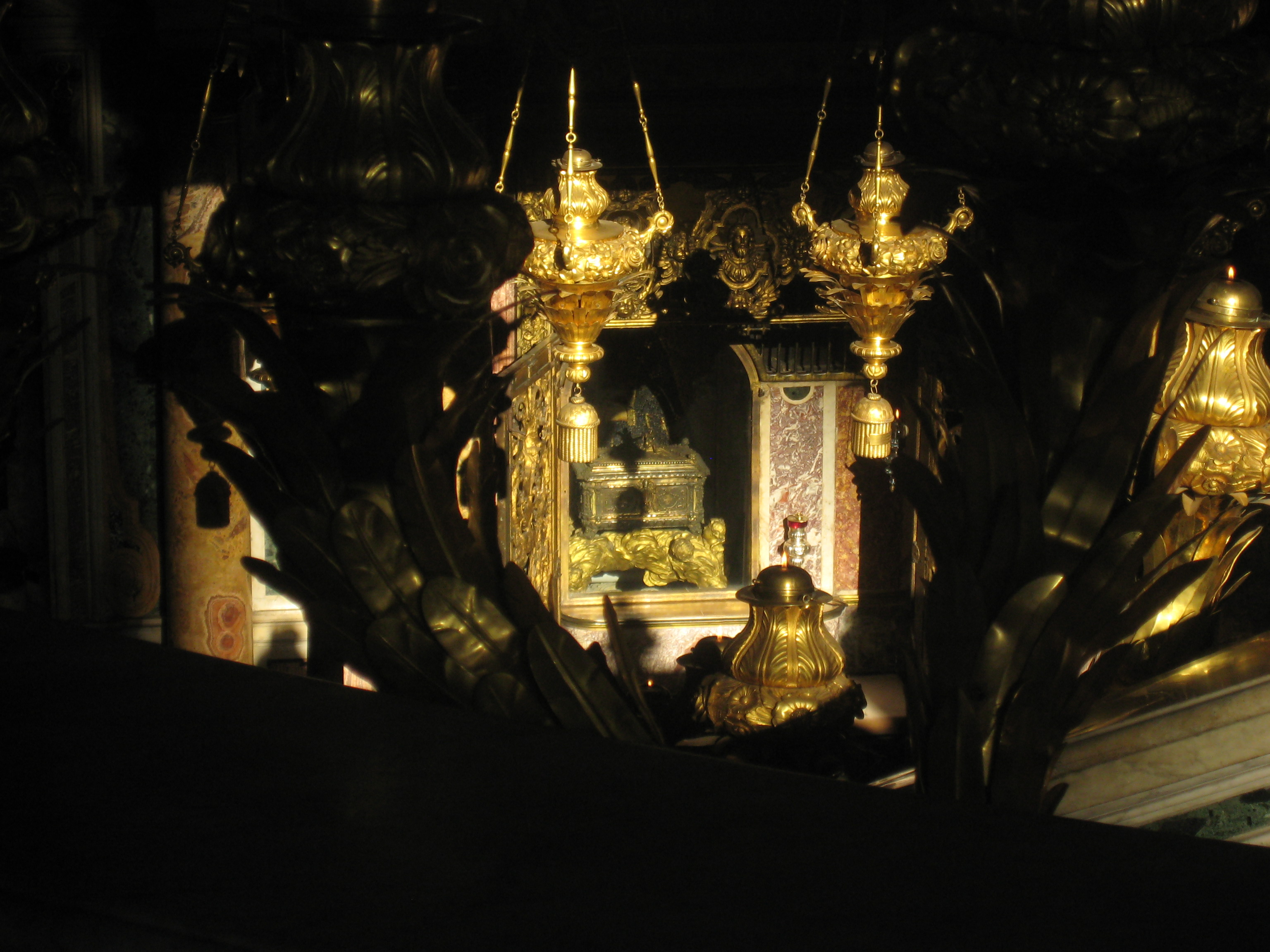
Looking down into the confessio near the tomb of Apostle Peter, St. Peter's Basilica, Rome

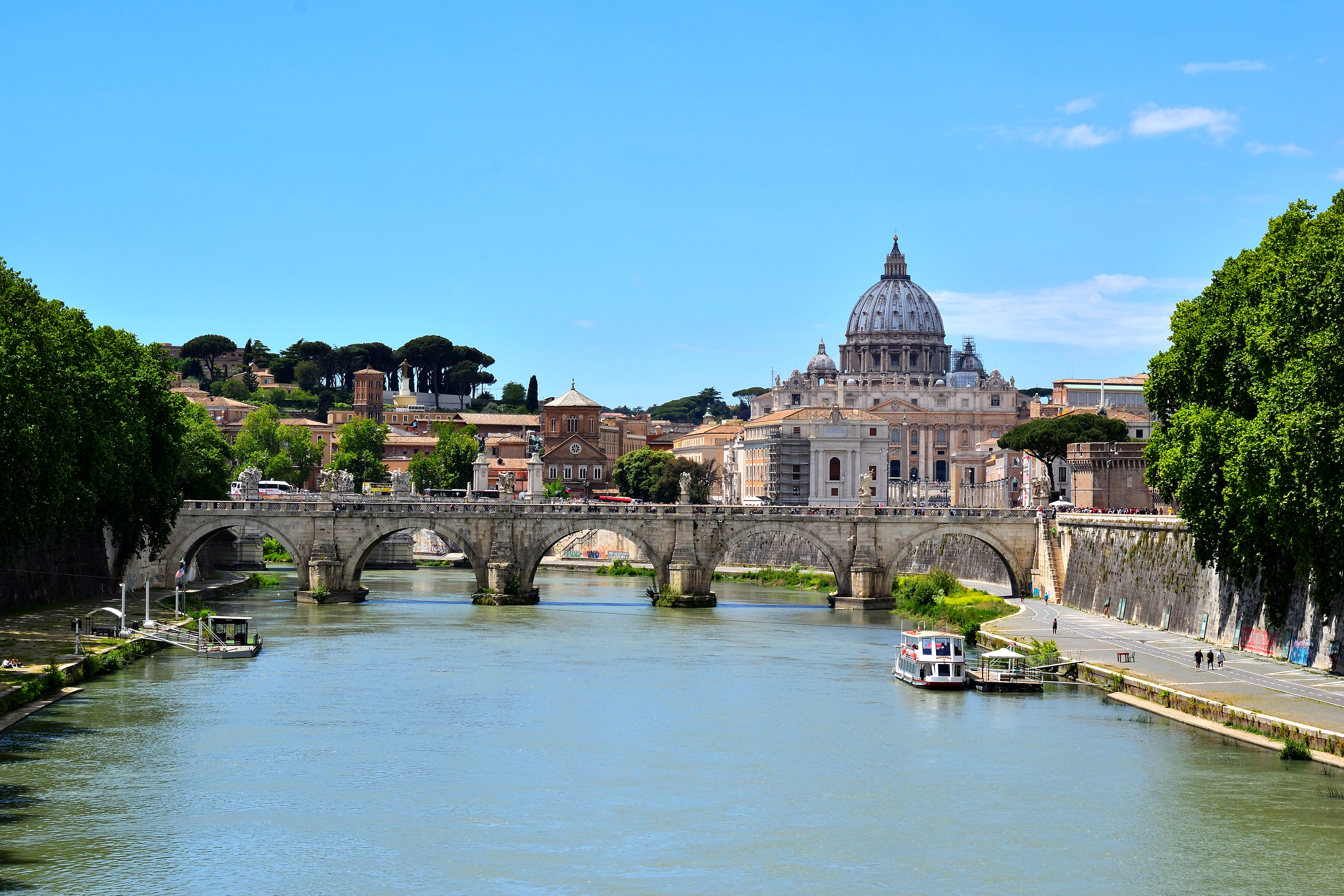
St. Peter's Basilica, believed to be the burial site of St. Peter, seen from the River Tiber

Catholic tradition holds that Peter's inverted crucifixion occurred in the gardens of Nero, with the burial in Saint Peter's tomb nearby.

Caius in his Disputation Against Proclus (AD 198), preserved in part by Eusebius, relates this of the places in which the remains of the apostles Peter and Paul were deposited: "I can point out the trophies of the apostles. For if you are willing to go to the Vatican or to the Ostian Way, you will find the trophies of those who founded this Church."

According to Jerome, in his work De Viris Illustribus (AD 392), "Peter was buried at Rome in the Vatican near the triumphal way where he is venerated by the whole world." The Liber Pontificalis states that he was buried on 29 June (the corrupted Liberian Catalogue gives it as the date of his death). Some authors have argued that the date was deliberately chosen to replace an old Roman festival, but this seems unlikely.

In the early 4th century, the Emperor Constantine I decided to honour Peter with a large basilica. Because the precise location of Peter's burial was so firmly fixed in the belief of the Christians of Rome, the church to house the basilica had to be erected on a site that was not convenient to construction. The slope of the Vatican Hill had to be excavated, even though the church could much more easily have been built on level ground only slightly to the south. There were also moral and legal issues, such as demolishing a cemetery to make room for the building. The focal point of the Basilica, both in its original form and in its later complete reconstruction, is the altar located over what is said to be the point of Peter's burial.

==== Relics ====
According to a letter quoted by Bede, Pope Vitalian sent a cross containing filings said to be from Peter's chains to the queen of Oswy, Anglo-Saxon King of Northumbria in 665, as well as unspecified relics of the saint to the king. The skull of Saint Peter is claimed to reside in the Archbasilica of Saint John Lateran since at least the ninth century, alongside the skull of Saint Paul.

In 1950, human bones were found buried underneath the altar of St. Peter's Basilica. The bones have been claimed by many to have been those of Peter. An attempt to contradict these claims was made in 1953 by the excavation of what some believe to be Saint Peter's tomb in Jerusalem. However along with this supposed tomb in Jerusalem bearing his previous name Simon (but not Peter), tombs bearing the names of Jesus, Mary, James, John, and the rest of the apostles were also found at the same excavation—though all these names were very common among Jews at the time.

In the 1960s, items from the excavations beneath St Peter's Basilica were re-examined, and the bones were identified as male. A forensic examination found them to be a male of about 61 years of age from the 1st century. This caused Pope Paul VI in 1968 to announce them most likely to be the relics of Apostle Peter. In November 2013, Pope Francis presented part of the relics, consisting of bone fragments, for the first time in public during a Mass celebrated in St. Peter's Square. In July 2019, it was announced that Pope Francis had transferred nine of these bone fragments within a bronze reliquary to Orthodox Ecumenical Patriarch Bartholomew of Constantinople. Bartholomew, who serves as head of the Eastern Orthodox Christian church, described the gesture as "brave and bold". Pope Francis has said his decision was born "out of prayer" and intended as a sign of the ongoing work towards communion between the Orthodox and Catholic churches. The majority of Saint Peter's remains, however, are still preserved in Rome, under the high altar of St. Peter's Basilica.

==== Scholarly views ====
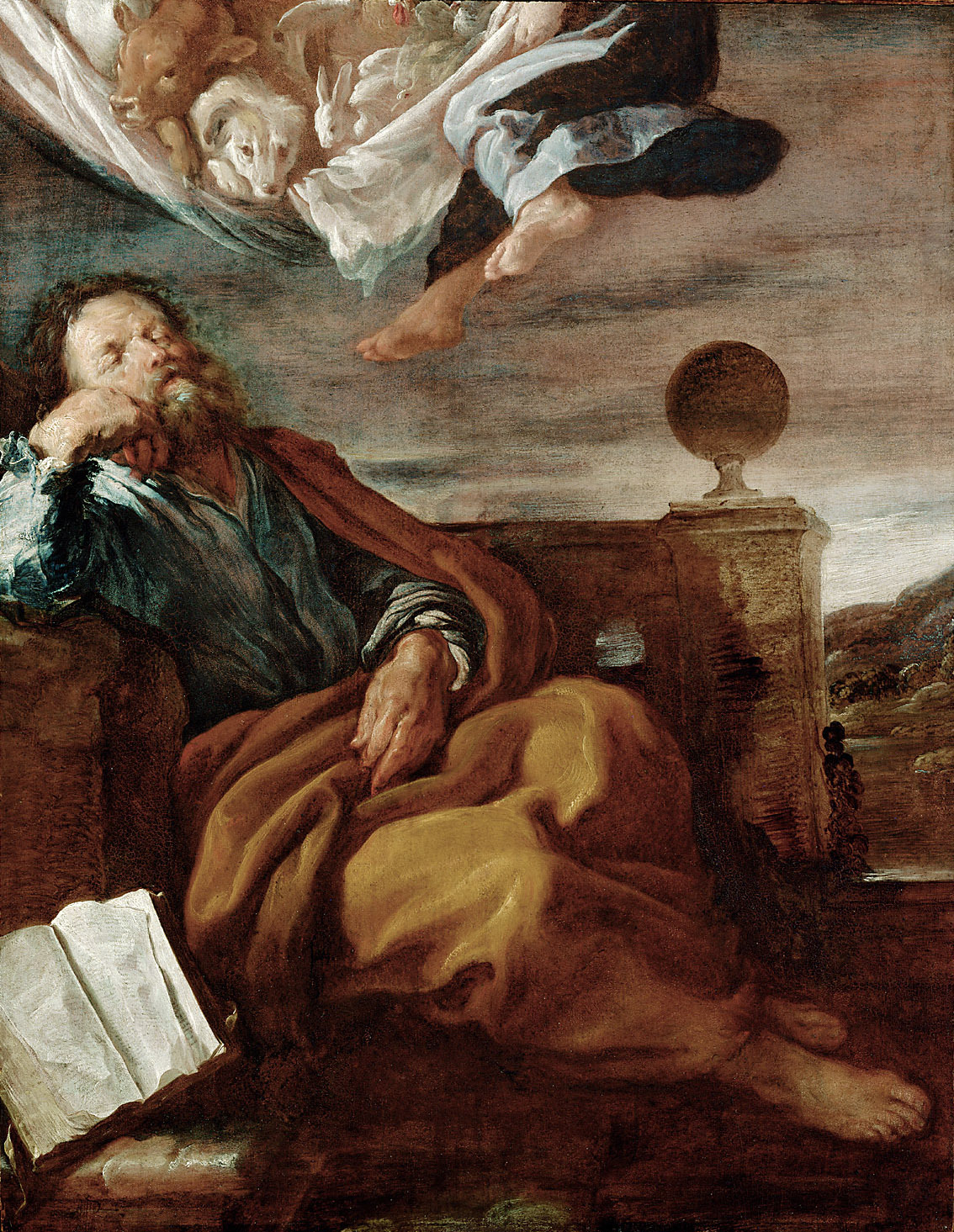
Peter's vision of a sheet with animals, Domenico Fetti, 1619

Some church historians consider Peter and Paul to have been martyred under the reign of Nero, around AD 65 after the Great Fire of Rome. (Note: Historians debate whether the Roman government distinguished between Christians and Jews prior to Nerva's modification of the Fiscus Judaicus in 96. From then on, practising Jews paid the tax, Christians did not.) Currently, most Catholic scholars, and many scholars in general, hold the view that Peter was martyred in Rome under Nero. (Note: Margherita Guarducci, who led the research leading to the rediscovery of Peter's reputed tomb in its last stages (1963–1968), concludes Peter died on 13 October AD 64 during the festivities on the occasion of the dies imperii of Emperor Nero.)

While accepting that Peter came to Rome and was martyred there, there is no historical evidence that he held episcopal office there. According to two studies published by the German philologist Otto Zwierlein in 2009 and 2013 respectively, "there is not a single piece of reliable literary evidence (and no archaeological evidence either) that Peter ever was in Rome." (Note: Zwierlein's thesis has caused debate. Zwierlein has made a summary of his view available online in English. An edited volume in German was also written in rebuttal against Otto Zwierlein's views.) Timothy Barnes has criticised Zwierlein's views as "a nadir in historical criticism".

Clement of Rome's First Letter, a document that has been dated from the 90s to the 120s, is one of the earliest sources adduced in support of Peter's stay in Rome, but Zwierlein questions the text's authenticity and whether it has any knowledge about Peter's life beyond what is contained in the New Testament Acts of the Apostles. The letter also does not mention any particular place, only saying: "Peter, through unrighteous envy, endured not one or two, but numerous labours and when he had at length suffered martyrdom, departed to the place of glory due to him" (ch. 5).

A letter to the Romans attributed to Ignatius of Antioch might imply that Peter and Paul had special authority over the Roman church, telling the Roman Christians: "I do not command you, as Peter and Paul did" (ch. 4), although Zwierlein says he could be simply referring to the Epistles of the Apostles, or their mission work in the city, not a special authority given or bestowed. Zwierlein questions the authenticity of this document and its traditional dating to c. 105 – c. 110, saying it may date from the final decades of the 2nd century instead of from the beginning.

The ancient historian Josephus describes how Roman soldiers would amuse themselves by crucifying criminals in different positions, and it is likely that this would have been known to the author of the Acts of Peter. The position attributed to Peter's crucifixion is thus plausible, either as having happened historically or as being an invention by the author of the Acts of Peter. Death, after crucifixion head down, is unlikely to be caused by suffocation, the usual "cause of death in ordinary crucifixion".

==== Rome as Babylon ====
Church tradition ascribes the epistles First and Second Peter to the Apostle Peter, as does the text of Second Peter itself, an attribution disputed by scholarship. First Peter says the author is in "Babylon", which has been held to be a coded reference to Rome. Early Church tradition reports that Peter wrote from Rome. Eusebius of Caesarea states:

Clement of Alexandria in the sixth [book] of the Hypotyposeis cites the story, and the bishop of Hierapolis named Papias joins him in testifying that Peter mentions Mark in the first epistle, which they say he composed in Rome herself, and that he indicates this, calling the city more figuratively Babylon by these: "She who is in Babylon, chosen together with you, sends you greetings and so does my son Mark. (1 Pet 5:13)"

If the reference is to Rome, it is the only biblical reference to Peter being there. Many scholars regard both First and Second Peter as not having been authored by him, partly because other parts of the Acts of the Apostles seem to describe Peter as an illiterate fisherman.

Most Biblical scholars believe that "Babylon" is a metaphor for the pagan Roman Empire at the time it persecuted Christians, before the Edict of Milan in 313: perhaps specifically referencing some aspect of Rome's rule (brutality, greed, paganism). Although most scholars recognise that Babylon is a metaphor for Rome, some also claim that Babylon represents more than the Roman city of the first century. According to Lutheran scholar on Revelation Craig R. Koester "the whore [of Babylon] is Rome, yet more than Rome". It "is the Roman imperial world, which in turn represents the world alienated from God".

At that time in history, although the region of Babylonia (southern Mesopotamia) was agriculturally productive and commercially active, the ancient city of Babylon was no longer of any importance. E.g., Strabo wrote, "The greater part of Babylon is so deserted that one would not hesitate to say ... the Great City is a great desert."

Another theory is that "Babylon" refers to the Babylon in Egypt that was an important fortress city in Egypt, just north of today's Cairo and this, combined with the "greetings from Mark" (1 Peter 5:13), who may be Mark the Evangelist, regarded as the founder of the Church of Alexandria (Egypt), has led some scholars to regard the First Peter epistle as having been written in Egypt.

== Feast days ==
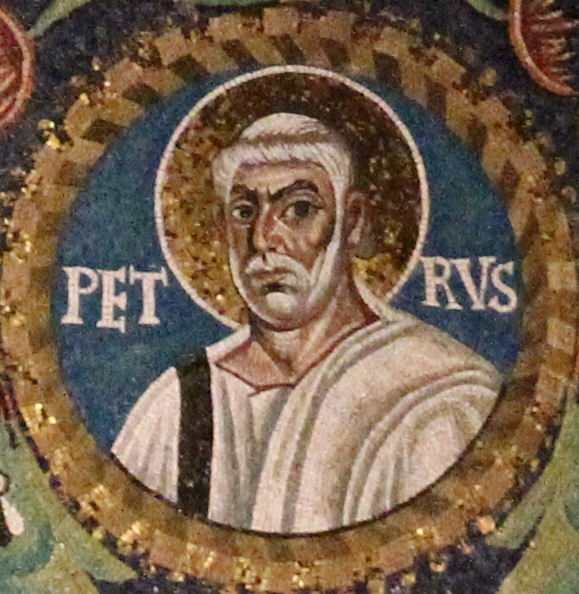
Peter the Apostle, detail of the mosaic in the Basilica of San Vitale, Ravenna, 6th century

The Roman Martyrology assigns 29 June as the feast day of both Peter and Paul, without thereby declaring that to be the day of their deaths. Augustine of Hippo says in his Sermon 295: "One day is assigned for the celebration of the martyrdom of the two apostles. But those two were one. Although their martyrdom occurred on different days, they were one."

This is also the feast of both Apostles in the calendar of the Eastern Orthodox Church.

In the Roman Rite, the feast of the Chair of Saint Peter is celebrated on 22 February, and the anniversary of the dedication of the two Papal Basilicas of Saint Peter's and Saint Paul outside the Walls is held on 18 November.

Before Pope John XXIII's revision in 1960, the Roman Calendar also included on 18 January another feast of the Chair of Saint Peter (denominated the Chair of Saint Peter in Rome, while the February feast was then called that of the Chair of Saint Peter at Antioch), and on 1 August the feast of Saint Peter in Chains.

In the Orthodox Daily Office every Thursday throughout the year is dedicated to the Holy Apostles, including Peter. There are also three feast days in the year which are dedicated to him:

- 16 January, Veneration of the Precious Chains of the Holy and All-Glorious Apostle Peter — commemorating both the chains which Acts 12:1–11 says miraculously fell from him, and the chains in which he was held before his martyrdom by Nero.
- 29 June, Feast of Saints Peter and Paul — This is a major feast day and is preceded by a period of Lenten fasting known as the Apostles' Fast.
- 30 June, Synaxis of the Holy, Glorious and All-Praised Twelve Apostles — commemorating of Twelve Apostles.

Peter is remembered (with Paul) in the Church of England with a Festival on 29 June, Peter the Apostle may be celebrated alone, without Paul, on 29 June.

== Primacy of Peter ==
Christians of different theological backgrounds are in disagreement as to the exact significance of Peter's ministry. For instance:

- Catholics view Peter as the first pope. The Catholic Church asserts that Peter's ministry, conferred upon him by Jesus of Nazareth in the gospels, lays down the theological foundation for the pope's exercise of pastoral authority over the Church.
- Eastern Orthodox also believe that Peter's ministry points to an underlying theology wherein a special primacy ought to be granted to Peter's successors above other Church leaders but see this as merely a "primacy of honor", rather than the right to exercise pastoral authority.
- Protestant denominations assert that Peter's apostolic work in Rome does not imply a connection between him and the papacy.

Similarly, historians of various backgrounds also offer differing interpretations of the Apostle's presence in Rome.

=== Catholic Church ===
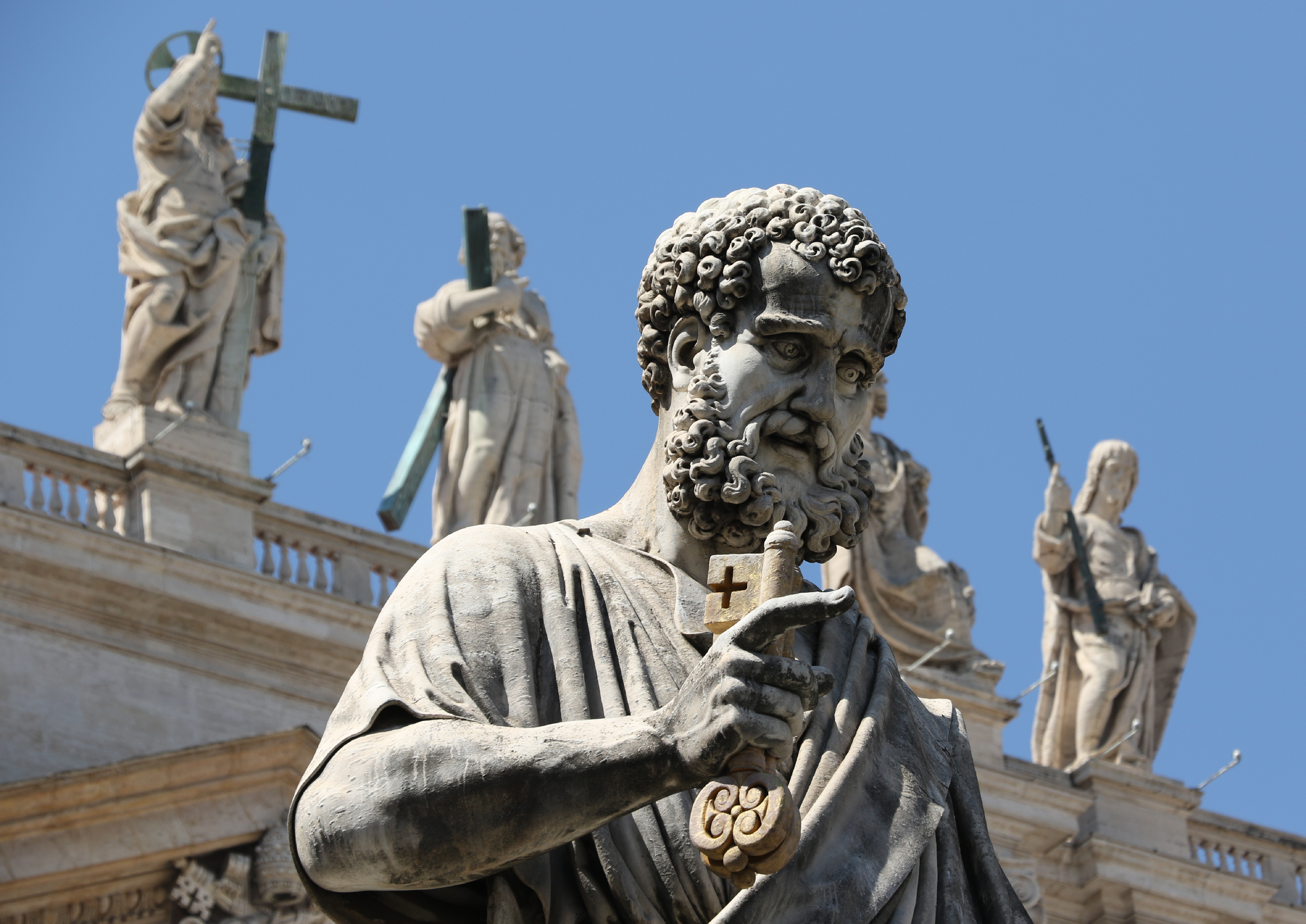
Statue of St. Peter in St. Peter's Square at the Vatican

According to Catholic belief, Simon Peter was distinguished by Jesus to hold the first place of honor and authority. Also in Catholic belief, Peter was, as the first Bishop of Rome, the first Pope. Furthermore, they consider every Pope to be Peter's successor and the rightful superior of all other bishops. However, Peter never bore the title of "Pope" or "Vicar of Christ". (Note: Hitchcock, Tutu & Esposito 2004, p. 281 note "Some (Christian communities) had been founded by Peter, the disciple Jesus designated as the founder of his church. [...] Once the position was institutionalized, historians looked back and recognized Peter as the first pope of the Christian church in Rome")

The Catholic Church's recognition of Peter as head of its church on earth (with Christ being its heavenly head) is based on its interpretation of passages from the canonical gospels of the New Testament, as well as sacred tradition.

==== John 21:15–17 ====
The first passage is John 21:15–17 which is: "Feed my lambs... Tend my sheep... feed my sheep" (within the Greek it is Ποίμαινε i.e., to feed and rule [as a Shepherd] v. 16, while Βόσκε i.e., to feed for v.15 & v. 17) – which is seen by Catholics as Christ promising the spiritual supremacy to Peter. The Catholic Encyclopedia of 1913 sees in this passage Jesus "charging [Peter] with the superintendency of all his sheep, without exception; and consequently of his whole flock, that is, of his own church".

==== Matthew 10:2 ====
In this passage, the evangelist writes: "First, Simon called Peter..." The Greek word for "first" (protos), derived from the ancient Greek πρῶτος, can mean primacy in foundation, not just in a numerical sense.

==== Matthew 16:18 ====
Another passage is Matthew 16:18:

I tell you that you are Peter, and on this rock I will build my church, and the gates of Hell will not overcome it. I will give you the keys of the kingdom of heaven; whatever you bind on earth will be bound in heaven, and whatever you loose on earth will be loosed in heaven.

— Matthew 16:18–19 (NIV)

===== Etymology =====
In the story of the calling of the disciples, Jesus addresses Simon Peter with the Greek term Κηφᾶς (Cephas), a Hellenised form of Aramaic ܟ݁ܺܐܦ݂ܳܐ (kepha), which means "rock", a term that before was not used as a proper name:

:ἐμβλέψας αὐτῷ ὁ Ἰησοῦς εἶπεν Σὺ εἶ Σίμων ὁ υἱὸς Ἰωάννου, σὺ κληθήσῃ Κηφᾶς ὃ ἑρμηνεύεται Πέτρος.

Having looked at him, Jesus said, "You are Simon the son of John; you will be called Cephas," which means Petros ("rock").

— John 1:42

Jesus later alludes to this nickname after Peter declares Jesus to be the Messiah:

:κἀγὼ δέ σοι λέγω ὅτι σὺ εἶ Πέτρος [Petros] καὶ ἐπὶ ταύτῃ τῇ πέτρᾳ [petra] οἰκοδομήσω μου τὴν ἐκκλησίαν, καὶ πύλαι ᾅδου οὐ κατισχύσουσιν αὐτῆς. (Note: Πέτρᾳ (petra "rock") is the feminine form of the Greek noun (Πέτρος) (Petros), which represents the masculine form; the two forms are identical in meaning.)

I also say to you now that you are Peter, and on this rock I will build my Church, and the gates of Hades will not prevail against it.

— Matthew 16:18

The Peshitta Syriac version renders Jesus' words into Aramaic as follows:

:ܐܳܦ݂ ܐܶܢܳܐ ܐܳܡܰܪ ܐ݈ܢܳܐ ܠܳܟ݂ ܕ݁ܰܐܢ݈ܬ݁ ܗ݈ܽܘ ܟ݁ܺܐܦ݂ܳܐ ܘܥܰܠ ܗܳܕ݂ܶܐ ܟ݁ܺܐܦ݂ܳܐ ܐܶܒ݂ܢܶܝܗ ܠܥܺܕ݈݁ܬ݁ܝ ܘܬ݂ܰܪܥܶܐ ܕ݁ܰܫܝܽܘܠ ܠܳܐ ܢܶܚܣܢܽܘܢܳܗ܂

Also I say to you that you are Kepha, and on this kepha I will build my Church, and the gates of Sheol not will subdue it.

— Matthew 16:18

Paul of Tarsus later uses the appellation Cephas in reference to Peter.

===== Interpretation of Matthew 16:18 =====
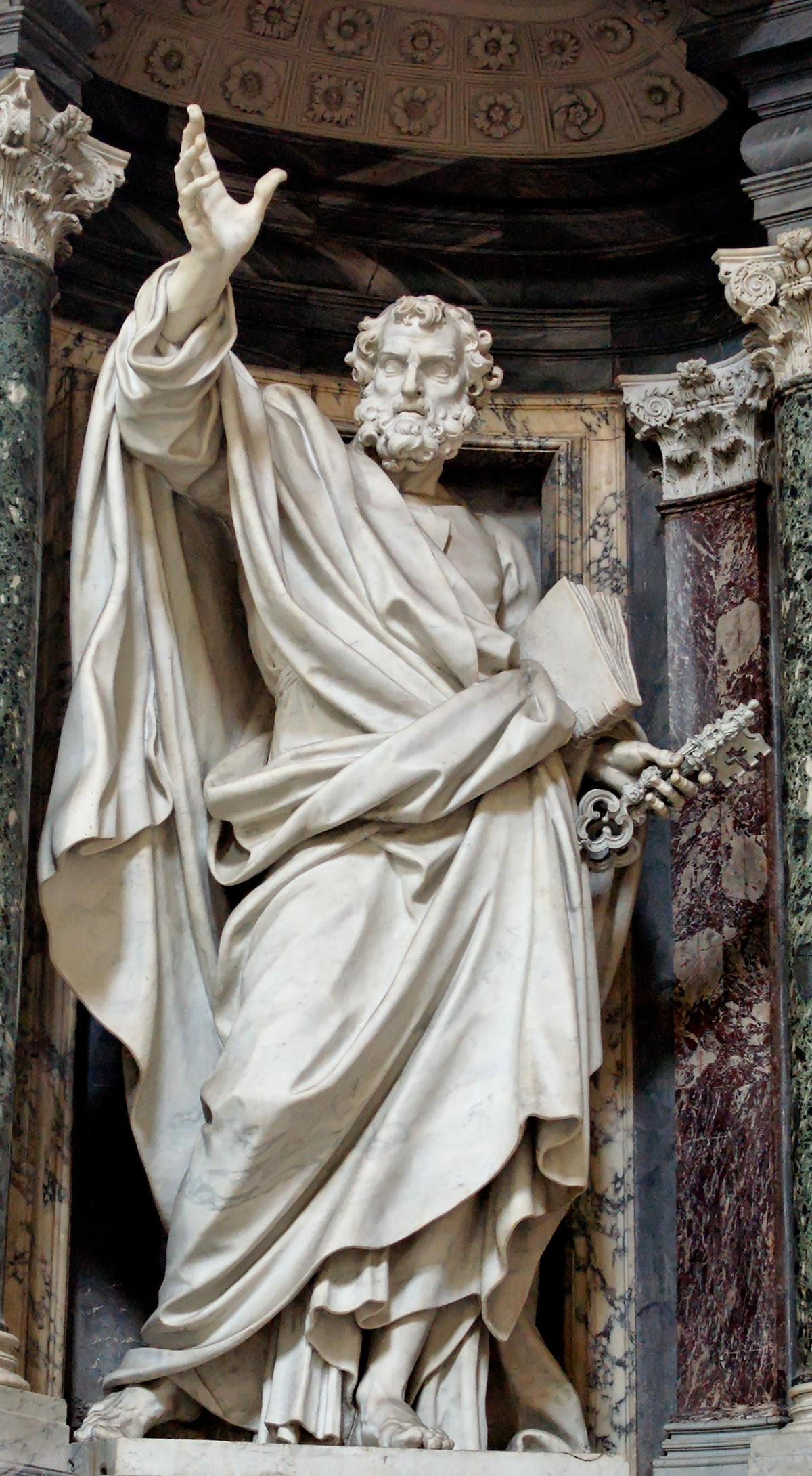
Statue of Saint Peter in the Archbasilica of Saint John Lateran by Pierre-Étienne Monnot. Peter holds the Keys of Heaven.

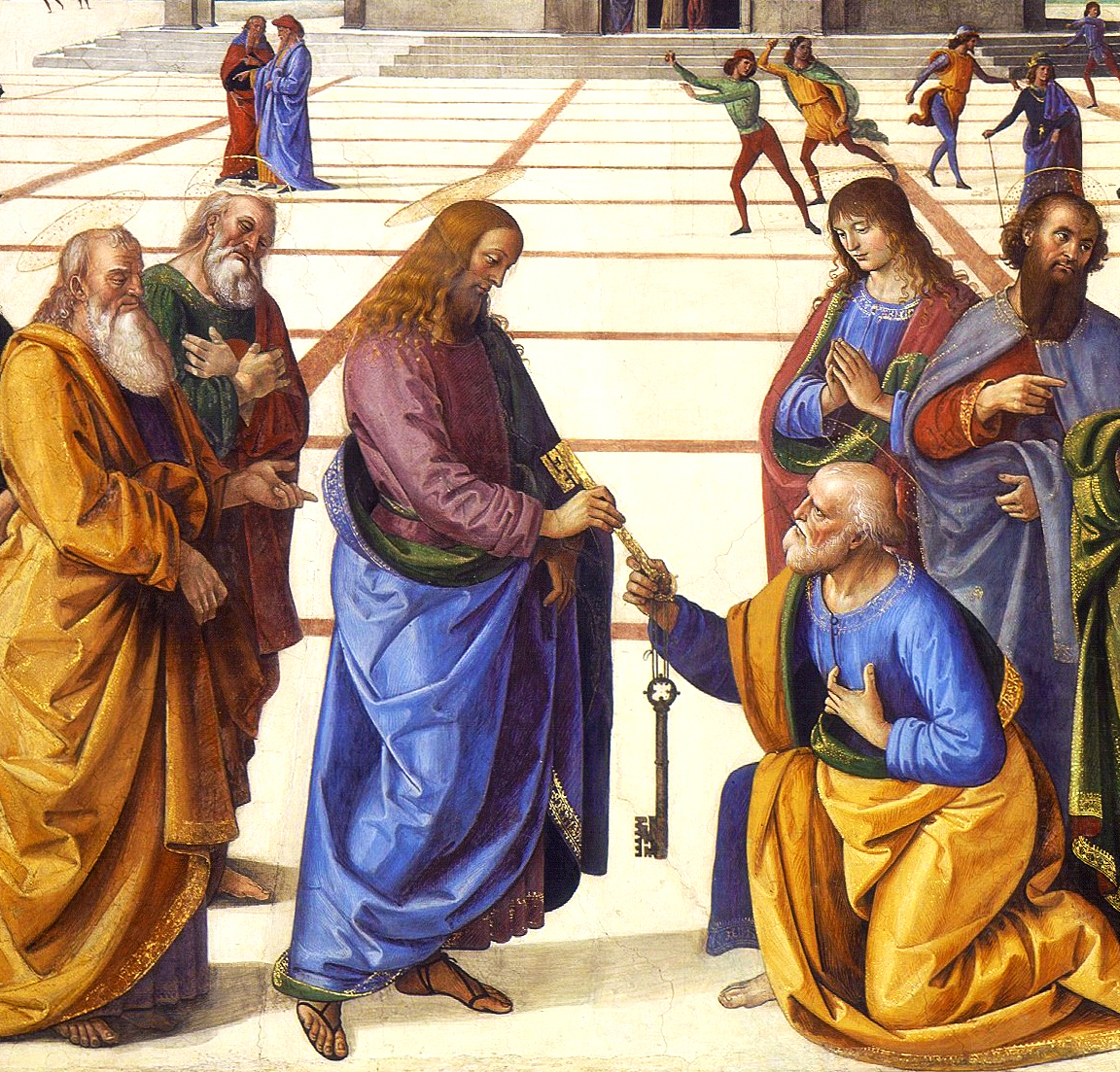
Christ Handing the Keys to St Peter, by Pietro Perugino (1481–1482)

To better understand what Christ meant, Basil of Caesarea elaborates:

Though Peter be a rock, yet he is not a rock as Christ is. For Christ is the true unmoveable rock of himself, Peter is unmoveable by Christ the rock. For Jesus doth communicate and impart his dignities, not voiding himself of them, but holding them to himself, bestoweth them also upon others. He is the light, and yet you are the light: he is the Priest, and yet he maketh Priests: he is the rock, and he made a rock.

— Basil li. De poenit. cƒ. Matt. v. 14; Luke 22:19

In reference to Peter's occupation before becoming an apostle, the popes wear the Fisherman's Ring, which bears an image of Peter casting his nets from a fishing boat. The keys used as a symbol of the pope's authority refer to the "keys of the kingdom of Heaven" promised to Peter. The terminology of this "commission" of Peter is unmistakably parallel to the commissioning of Eliakim ben Hilkiah in Isaiah 22:15–23. Peter is often depicted in both Western and Eastern Christian art holding a key or a set of keys.

In the original Greek the word translated as "Peter" is Πέτρος (Petros) and that translated as "rock" is πέτρα (petra), two words that, while not identical, give an impression of one of many times when Jesus used a play on words. Furthermore, since Jesus presumably spoke to Peter in their native Aramaic language, he would have used kepha in both instances. The Peshitta Text and the Old Syriac texts use the word "kepha" for both "Peter" and "rock" in Matthew 16:18. John 1:42 says Jesus called Simon "Cephas", as Paul calls him in some letters. He was instructed by Christ to strengthen his brethren, i.e., the apostles. Peter also had a leadership role in the early Christian church at Jerusalem according to The Acts of the Apostles chapters 1–2, 10–11, and 15.

Early Catholic Latin and Greek writers (such as John Chrysostom) considered the "foundation rock" as applying to both Peter personally and his confession of faith (or the faith of his confession) symbolically, as well as seeing Christ's promise to apply more generally to his twelve apostles and the Church at large. This "double meaning" interpretation is present in the current Catechism of the Catholic Church.

Protestant arguments against the Catholic interpretation are largely based on the difference between the Greek words translated "Rock" in the Matthean passage. They often claim that in classical Attic Greek petros (masculine) generally meant "pebble", while petra (feminine) meant "boulder" or "cliff", and accordingly, taking Peter's name to mean "pebble", they argue that the "rock" in question cannot have been Peter, but something else, either Jesus himself or the faith in Jesus that Peter had just professed. These popular-level writings are disputed in similar popular-level Catholic writings.

The New Testament was written in Koiné Greek, not Attic Greek and some authorities say no significant difference existed between the meanings of petros and petra. So far from meaning a pebble was the word petros that Apollonius Rhodius, a writer of Koiné Greek of the third century BC, used it to refer to "a huge round boulder, a terrible quoit of Ares Enyalius; four stalwart youths could not have raised it from the ground even a little".

The feminine noun petra (πέτρα in Greek), translated as rock in the phrase "on this rock I will build my church", is also used in 1 Cor. 10:4 describing Jesus Christ, which reads: "They all ate the same spiritual food and drank the same spiritual drink; for they drank from the spiritual rock that accompanied them, and that rock was Christ."

Although Matthew 16 is used as a primary proof-text for the Catholic doctrine of Papal supremacy, some Protestant scholars say that prior to the Reformation of the 16th century, Matthew 16 was very rarely used to support papal claims, despite it being well documented as being used in the 3rd century by Stephen of Rome against Cyprian of Carriage in a "passionate disagreement" about baptism, and in the 4th century by Pope Damasus as a claim to primacy as a lesson of the Arian Controversy for stricter discipline and centralised control. Their position is that most of the early and medieval Church interpreted the "rock" as being a reference either to Christ or to Peter's faith, not Peter himself. They understand Jesus' remark to have been his affirmation of Peter's testimony that Jesus was the Son of God.

Despite this claim, many Fathers saw a connection between Matthew 16:18 and the primacy of Peter and his office, such as Tertullian, writing: "The Lord said to Peter, 'On this rock I will build my Church, I have given you the keys of the kingdom of heaven [and] whatever you shall have bound or loosed on earth will be bound or loosed in heaven' [Matt. 16:18–19]. ...Upon you, he says, I will build my Church; and I will give to you the keys, not to the Church."

==== Epistles of Paul ====
Paul's Epistle to the Romans, written about AD 57. greets some fifty people in Rome by name, but not Peter whom he knew. There is also no mention of Peter in Rome later during Paul's two-year stay there in Acts 28, about AD 60–62. Some Church historians consider Peter and Paul to have been martyred under the reign of Nero, around AD 64 or 68.

==== Protestant rejection of Catholic claims ====
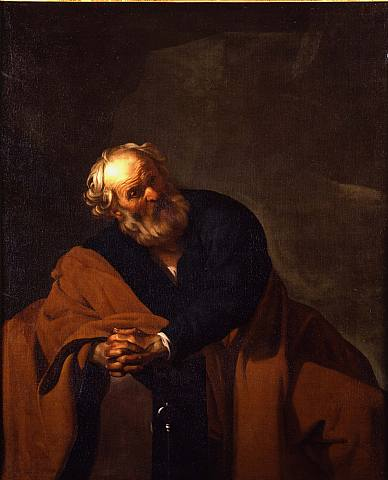
Saint Peter by Dirck van Baburen (c. 1615–1620)

Other theologically conservative Christians, including Confessional Lutherans, also rebut comments made by Karl Keating and D.A. Carson who claim that there is no distinction between the words petros and petra in Koine Greek. The Lutheran theologians state that the dictionaries of Koine/NT Greek, including the authoritative Bauer-Danker-Arndt-Gingrich Lexicon, indeed list both words and the passages that give different meanings for each. The Lutheran theologians further note that:

We honor Peter and in fact some of our churches are named after him, but he was not the first pope, nor was he Roman Catholic. If you read his first letter, you will see that he did not teach a Roman hierarchy, but that all Christians are royal priests. The same keys given to Peter in Matthew 16 are given to the whole church of believers in Matthew 18.

Oscar Cullmann, a Lutheran theologian and distinguished Church historian, disagrees with Luther and the Protestant reformers who held that by "rock" Christ did not mean Peter, but meant either himself or the faith of his followers. He believes the meaning of the original Aramaic is very clear: that "Kepha" was the Aramaic word for "rock", and that it was also the name by which Christ called Peter.

Yet, Cullmann sharply rejects the Catholic claim that Peter began the papal succession. He writes: "In the life of Peter there is no starting point for a chain of succession to the leadership of the church at large". While he believes the Matthew text is entirely valid and is in no way spurious, he says it cannot be used as "warrant of the papal succession". Cullmann concludes that while Peter was the original head of the apostles, Peter was not the founder of any visible church succession.

There are other Protestant scholars who also partially defend the historical Catholic position about "Rock". Taking a somewhat different approach from Cullman, they point out that the Gospel of Matthew was not written in the classical Attic form of Greek, but in the Hellenistic Koine dialect in which there is no distinction in meaning between petros and petra. Even in Attic Greek, in which the regular meaning of petros was a smallish "stone", there are instances of its use to refer to larger rocks, as in Sophocles, Oedipus at Colonus, v. 1595, where petros refers to a boulder used as a landmark, obviously something more than a pebble. In any case, a petros/petra distinction is irrelevant considering the Aramaic language in which the phrase might well have been spoken. In Greek, of any period, the feminine noun petra could not be used as the given name of a male, which may explain the use of Petros as the Greek word with which to translate Aramaic Kepha.

Yet, still other Protestant scholars believe that Jesus in fact did mean to single out Peter as the very rock which he will build upon, but that the passage does nothing to indicate a continued succession of Peter's implied position. They assert that Matthew uses the demonstrative pronoun taute, which allegedly means "this very" or "this same" when he refers to the rock on which Jesus' church will be built. He also uses the Greek word for "and", kai. It is alleged that when a demonstrative pronoun is used with kai, the pronoun refers back to the preceding noun. The second rock Jesus refers to must then be the same rock as the first one; and if Peter is the first rock, he must also be the second.

Unlike Oscar Cullmann, Confessional Lutherans and many other Protestant apologists agree that it's meaningless to elaborate the meaning of "Rock" by looking at the Aramaic language. While the Jews spoke mostly Aramaic at home, in public they usually spoke Greek. The few Aramaic words spoken by Jesus in public were unusual, which is why they are noted as such. And most importantly the New Testament was revealed in Koine Greek, not Aramaic.

Lutheran historians even report that the Catholic church itself did not, at least unanimously, regard Peter as the rock until the 1870s:

Rome's rule for explaining the Scriptures and determining doctrine is the Creed of Pius IV. This Creed binds Rome to explain the Scriptures only according to the unanimous consent of the Fathers. In the year 1870 when the Fathers gathered and the pope declared his infallibility, the cardinals were not in agreement on Matthew 16:18. They had five different interpretations. Seventeen insisted Peter is the rock. Sixteen held that Christ is the rock. Eight were emphatic that the whole apostolic college is the rock. Forty-four said Peter's faith is the rock, The remainder looked upon the whole body of believers as the rock. – And yet Rome taught and still teaches that Peter is the rock.

=== Eastern Orthodox ===
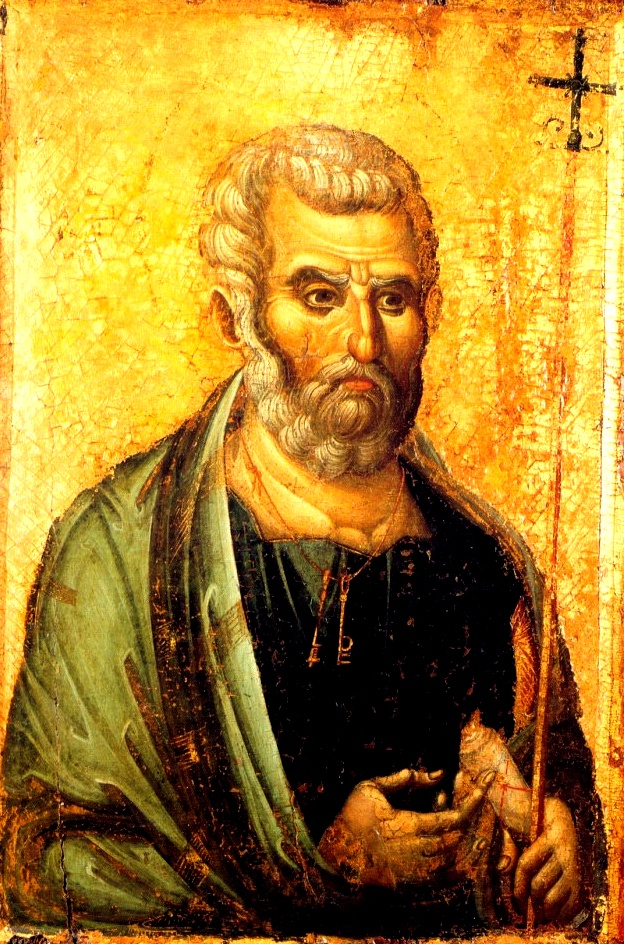
13th-century Eastern Orthodox icon of Apostle Peter

The Eastern Orthodox Church regards Apostle Peter, together with Apostle Paul, as "Preeminent Apostles". Another title used for Peter is Coryphaeus, which could be translated as "Choir-director", or lead singer. The church recognises Apostle Peter's leadership role in the early church, especially in the very early days at Jerusalem, but does not consider him to have had any "princely" role over his fellow Apostles.

The New Testament is not seen by the Orthodox as supporting any extraordinary authority for Peter with regard to faith or morals. The Orthodox also hold that Peter did not act as leader at the Council of Jerusalem, but as merely one of a number who spoke. The final decision regarding the non-necessity of circumcision (and certain prohibitions) was spelled out by James, brother of Jesus, though Catholics hold that James merely reiterated and fleshed out what Peter had said regarding the latter's earlier divine revelation regarding the inclusion of Gentiles.

Eastern and Oriental Orthodox do not recognise the Bishop of Rome as the successor of Peter but the Ecumenical Patriarch of Constantinople sends a delegation each year to Rome to participate in the celebration of the feast of Sts. Peter and Paul. In the Ravenna Document of October 2007, the representatives of the Eastern Orthodox Church agreed that "Rome, as the Church that "presides in love" according to the phrase of Ignatius of Antioch ("To the Romans", Prologue), occupied the first place in the taxis, and that the bishop of Rome was therefore the protos among the patriarchs if the Papacy unites with the Orthodox Church. They disagree on the interpretation of the historical evidence from this era regarding the prerogatives of the bishop of Rome as protos, a matter that was already understood in different ways in the first millennium".

With regard to Jesus' words to Peter, "Thou art Peter and upon this rock I will build my church", the Orthodox hold Christ is referring to the confession of faith, not the person of Peter as that upon which he will build the church. This is allegedly shown by the fact that the original Septuagint uses the feminine demonstrative pronoun when he says, "upon this rock" (ταύτῃ τῇ πέτρᾳ); whereas, grammatically, if he had been referring to Peter, he would allegedly have used the masculine.

=== Syriac Orthodox Church ===
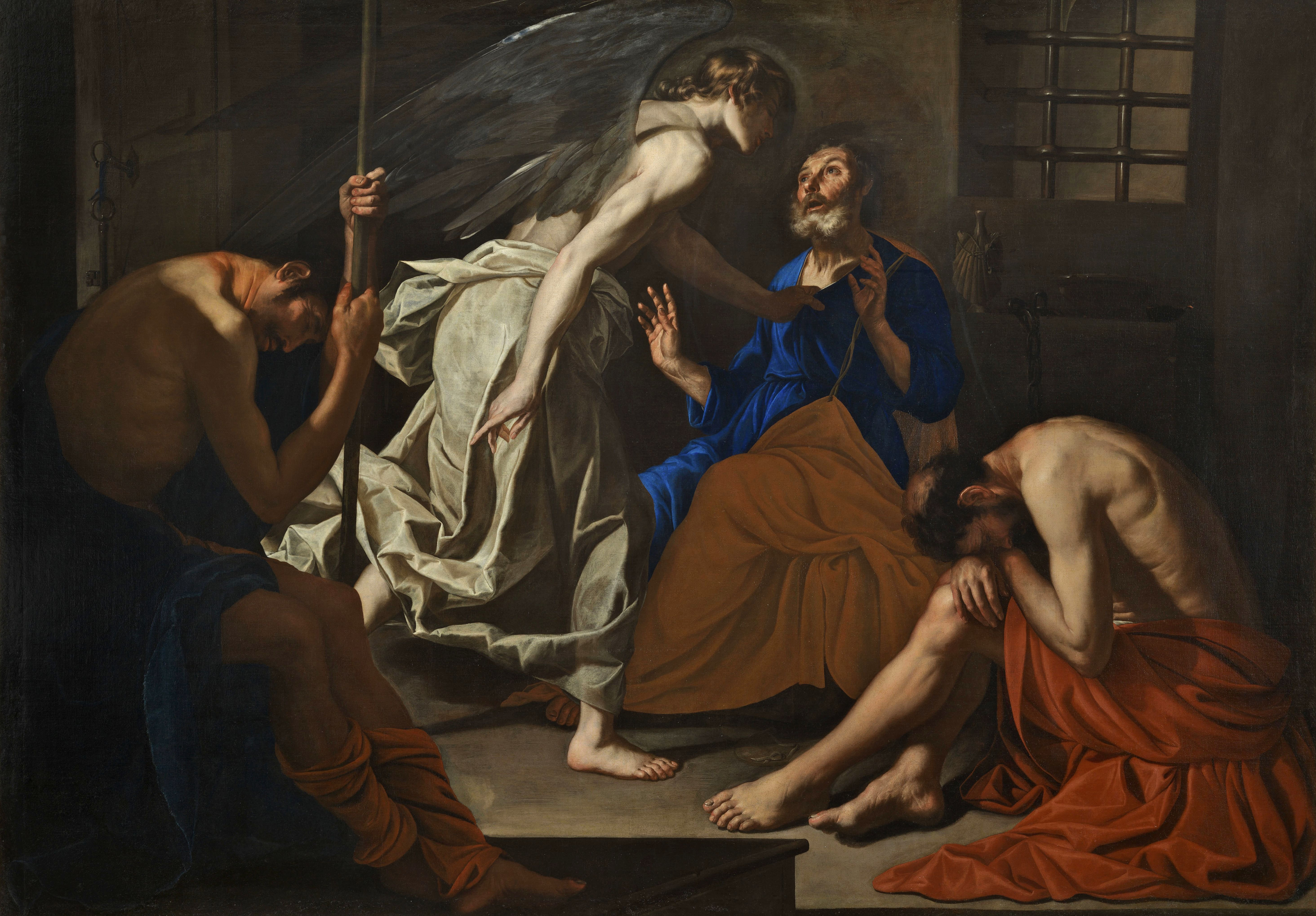
Saint Peter and the angel, early 1640s, by Antonio de Bellis

The Fathers of the Syriac Orthodox Church tried to give a theological interpretation to the primacy of Apostle Peter. They were fully convinced of the unique office of Peter in the primitive Christian community. Ephrem, Aphrahat and Maruthas who were supposed to have been the best exponents of the early Syriac tradition unequivocally acknowledge the office of Peter.

The Syriac Fathers, following the rabbinic tradition, call Jesus "Kepha" for they see "rock" in the Old Testament as a messianic Symbol. The Old Maronite Syriacs of Lebanon still refer to Saint Peter as "Saint Simon the Generous" or Simon Karam". When Christ gave his own name "Kepha" to Simon, he was giving him participation in the person and office of Christ. Christ who is the Kepha and shepherd made Simon the chief shepherd in his place and gave him the very name Kepha and said that on Kepha he would build the Church.

Aphrahat shared the common Syriac tradition. For him Kepha is another name of Jesus, and Simon was given the right to share the name. The person who receives somebody else's name also obtains the rights of the person who bestows the name. Aphrahat makes the stone taken from Jordan a type of Peter. He wrote: "Jesus [Joshua] son of Nun set up the stones for a witness in Israel; Jesus our Saviour called Simon Kepha Sarirto and set him as the faithful witness among nations."

Again, he wrote in his commentary on Deuteronomy that Moses brought forth water from "rock" (Kepha) for the people and Jesus sent Simon Kepha to carry his teachings among nations. God accepted him and made him the foundation of the Church and called him Kepha. When he speaks about the transfiguration of Christ he calls him Simon Peter, the foundation of the Church. Ephrem also shared the same view. The Armenian version of De Virginitate records that Peter the rock shunned honour. A mimro of Efrem found in Holy Week Liturgy points to the importance of Peter.

Both Aphrahat and Ephrem represent the authentic tradition of the Syrian Church. The different orders of liturgies used for sanctification of Church buildings, marriage, ordination, et cetera, reveal that the primacy of Peter is a part of living faith of the Church.

=== New Apostolic Church ===
The New Apostolic Church, which believes in the re-established Apostle ministry, sees Peter as the first Chief Apostle.

=== The Church of Jesus Christ of Latter-day Saints ===
The Church of Jesus Christ of Latter-day Saints teaches that Peter was the first leader of the early Christian church after the death and resurrection of Jesus Christ. While the Church accepts apostolic succession from Peter, it rejects papal successors as illegitimate. Joseph Smith, the founder of Mormonism, recorded in multiple revelations that the resurrected Peter appeared to him and Oliver Cowdery in 1829, near Harmony Township, Susquehanna County, Pennsylvania, in order to bestow the apostleship and keys of the kingdom as part of a restoration of priesthood authority.

In interpreting Matthew 16:13–19, Latter-day Saint leader Bruce R. McConkie stated, "The things of God are known only by the power of his Spirit", and "that which the world calls Mormonism is based upon the rock of revelation". In his April 1981 general conference address, McConkie identified the rock of which Jesus spoke as the rock of revelation: "There is no other foundation upon which the Lord could build His Church and kingdom. ...Revelation: Pure, perfect, personal revelation—this is the rock!"

== Non-Christian views ==
=== Judaism ===
According to an old Jewish tradition, Simon Peter joined the early Christians at the decision of the rabbis. Worried that early Christianity's similarity to Judaism would lead people to mistake it for a branch of Judaism, he was chosen to join them. As he moved up in rank, he would be able to lead them into forming their own, distinct belief system. Despite this, he was said to remain a practicing Jew and is ascribed with the authorship of the Nishmas prayer.

=== Islam ===
Muslims consider Jesus a prophet of God. The Qur'an also speaks of Jesus's disciples but does not mention their names, instead referring to them as "helpers to the prophet of God". Muslim exegesis and Qur'an commentary, however, names them and includes Peter among the disciples. An old tradition, which involves Habib the Carpenter, mentions that Peter was one of the three disciples sent to Antioch to preach to the people there.

Twelver Shia Muslims see a parallel in the figure of Peter to Ali at Muhammad's time. They look upon Ali as being the vicegerent, with Muhammad being the prophet; likewise, they see Peter as the vicegerent, behind Jesus the prophet and Masih. Peter's role as the first proper leader of the church is also seen by Shias to be a parallel to their belief in Ali as the first caliph after Muhammad. According to Twelver Shia belief, the imamate is a possible fufillment of the Old Testament verse promising 12 princes from the lineage of Ishmael which is sealed with the final Imam Mahdi whose mother is believed to be a descendant of Saint Peter.

=== Bahá'í Faith ===
In the Bahá'í Faith "the primacy of Peter, the Prince of the Apostles, is upheld and defended." Bahá'ís understand Peter's station as The Rock upon which the church of God would be founded to mean that Peter's belief in Christ as the Son of the living God would serve as the foundation for Christianity, and that upon this belief would the foundation of the church of God, understood as the Law of God, be established. Peter appears in the writings of Bahá'u'lláh, the Prophet-Founder of the Bahá'í Faith, often referred to as The Rock:

O followers of all religions! We behold you wandering distraught in the wilderness of error. Ye are the fish of this Ocean; wherefore do ye withhold yourselves from that which sustaineth you? Lo, it surgeth before your faces. Hasten unto it from every clime. This is the day whereon the Rock (Peter) crieth out and shouteth, and celebrateth the praise of its Lord, the All-Possessing, the Most High, saying: "Lo! The Father is come, and that which ye were promised in the Kingdom is fulfilled!"

— Bahá'u'lláh, The Summons of the Lord of Hosts

=== Ossetian mythology ===
His name with a prefix dan (related to river names) was applied to Donbettyr, the Ossetian god of waters, patron of fish and fishermen.

=== Andean traditional medicine ===
San Pedro cactus (Echinopsis pachanoi) has a long history of being used in Andean traditional medicine. The common name "San Pedro cactus" – Saint Peter cactus, is attributed to the belief that as St Peter holds the keys to heaven, the effects of the cactus allow users "to reach heaven while still on earth". In 2022, the Peruvian Ministry of Culture declared the traditional use of San Pedro cactus in northern Peru as cultural heritage.

== Writings ==
Traditionally, two canonical epistles (First Epistle of Peter and Second Epistle of Peter) and several apocryphal works have been attributed to Peter.

=== New Testament ===
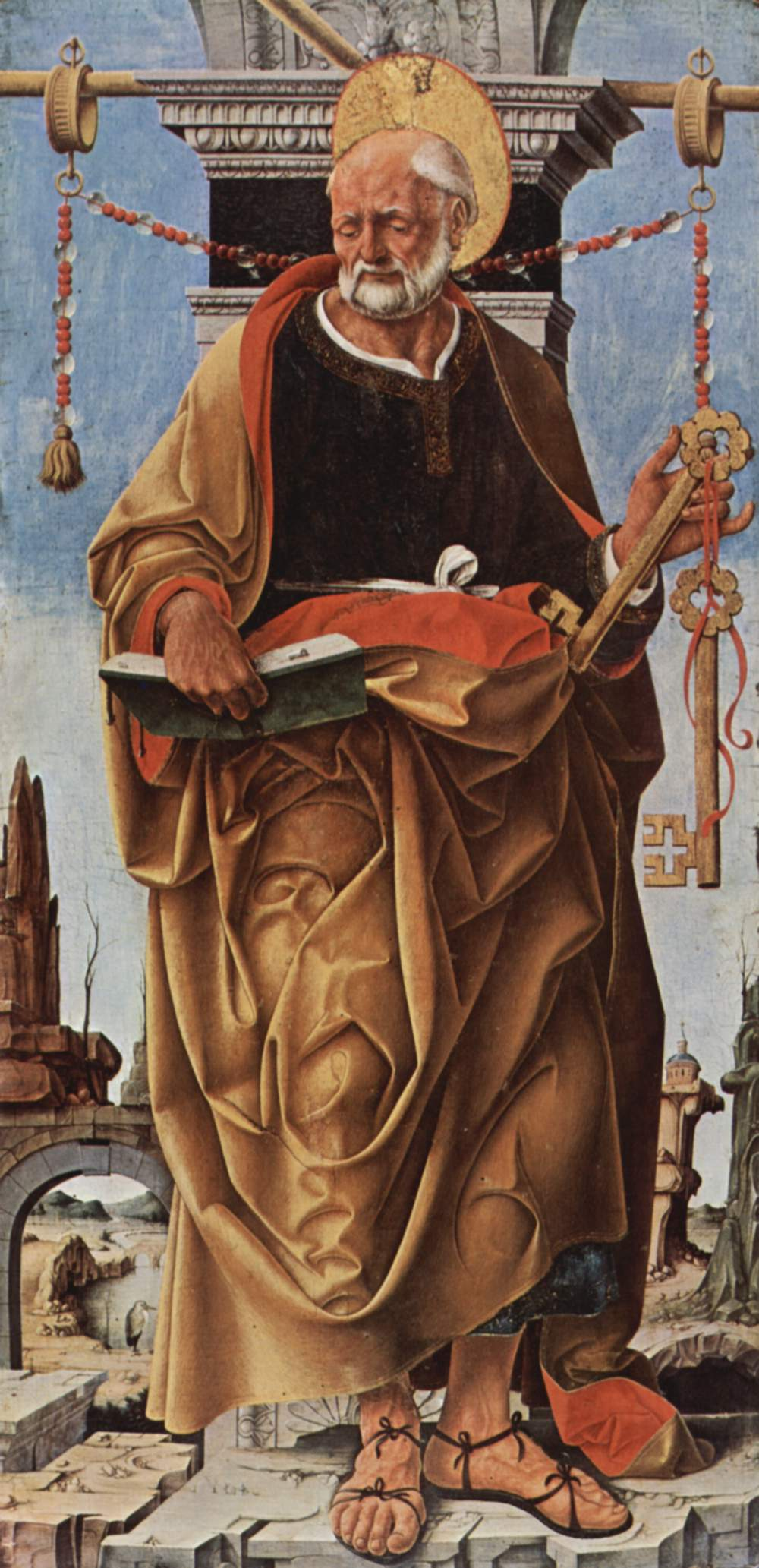
St Peter by Francesco del Cossa, 1473

==== Epistles ====
The New Testament includes two letters (epistles) ascribed to Peter. Both demonstrate a high quality of cultured and urban Greek, at odds with the linguistic skill that would ordinarily be expected of an Aramaic-speaking fisherman, who would have learned Greek as a second or third language. The textual features of these two epistles are such that a majority of scholars doubt that they were written by the same hand. Some scholars argue that theological differences imply different sources and point to the lack of references to Second Epistle of Peter among the early Church Fathers.

Daniel B. Wallace, who maintains that Peter was the author, writes that, for many scholars, "the issue of authorship is already settled, at least negatively: the apostle Peter did not write this letter" and that "the vast bulk of NT scholars adopts this perspective without much discussion". However, he later states, "Although a very strong case has been made against Petrine authorship of 2 Peter, we believe it is deficient. ...Taken together, these external and internal arguments strongly suggest the traditional view, viz., that Peter was indeed the author of the second epistle which bears his name."

Of the two epistles, the first epistle is considered the earlier. A number of scholars have argued that the textual discrepancies with what would be expected of the biblical Peter are due to it having been written with the help of a secretary or as an amanuensis.

Jerome explains:

The two Epistles attributed to St. Peter differ in style, character, and the construction of the words, which proves that according to the exigencies of the moment St. Peter made use of different interpreters. (Epistle 120 – To Hedibia)

Some have seen a reference to the use of a secretary in the sentence: "By Silvanus, a faithful brother unto you, as I suppose, I have written briefly, exhorting, and testifying that this is the true grace of God wherein ye stand". However New Testament scholar Bart D. Ehrman in his 2011 book Forged states that "scholars now widely recognise that when the author indicates that he wrote the book "through Silvanus", he is indicating not the name of his secretary, but the person who was carrying his letter to the recipients".

The letter refers to Roman persecution of Christians, apparently of an official nature. The Roman historian Tacitus and the biographer Suetonius do both record that Nero persecuted Christians, and Tacitus dates this to immediately after the fire that burned Rome in 64. Christian tradition, for example Eusebius of Caesarea (History book 2, 24.1), has maintained that Peter was killed in Nero's persecution, and thus had to assume that the Roman persecution alluded to in First Peter must be this Neronian persecution. Many modern scholars argue that First Peter refers to the persecution of Christians in Asia Minor during the reign of the emperor Domitian (81–96), as the letter is explicitly addressed to Jewish Christians from that region:

Peter, an apostle of Jesus Christ, to God's elect, strangers in the world, scattered throughout Pontus, Galatia, Cappadocia, Asia and Bithynia, who have been chosen according to the foreknowledge of God the Father, through the sanctifying work of the Spirit, for obedience to Jesus Christ and sprinkling by his blood: Grace and peace be yours in abundance.

Those scholars who believe that the epistle dates from the time of Domitian argue that Nero's persecution of Christians was confined to the city of Rome itself and did not extend to the Asian provinces mentioned in 1 Pet 1:1–2.

The Second Epistle of Peter appears to have been copied, in part, from the Epistle of Jude, and some modern scholars date its composition as late as c. 150. Some scholars argue the opposite, that the Epistle of Jude copied Second Peter, while others contend an early date for Jude and thus observe that an early date is not incompatible with the text. Many scholars have noted the similarities between the apocryphal Second Epistle of Clement (2nd century) and Second Peter. Second Peter may be earlier than 150. There are a few possible references to it that date back to the 1st century or early 2nd century, e.g., 1 Clement written in c. 96, and the later church historian Eusebius wrote that Origen had made reference to the epistle before 250.

Jerome says that Peter "wrote two epistles which are called Catholic, the second of which, on account of its difference from the first in style, is considered by many not to be by him" (De Viris Illustribus 1). But he himself received the epistle, and explained the difference in style, character, and structure of words by the assumption that Peter used different interpreters in the composition of the two epistles; and from his time onward the epistle was generally regarded as a part of the New Testament.

Even in early times there was controversy over its authorship, and Second Peter was often not included in the biblical canon; it was only in the 4th century that it gained a firm foothold in the New Testament, in a series of synods. In the East, the Syriac Orthodox Church admitted it into the canon in the 6th century.

==== Mark ====
Traditionally, the Gospel of Mark was said to have been written by a person named John Mark, and that this person was an assistant to Peter; hence its content was traditionally seen as the closest to Peter's viewpoint. According to Eusebius' Ecclesiastical History, Papias recorded this belief from John the Presbyter:

Mark having become the interpreter of Peter, wrote down accurately whatsoever he remembered. It was not, however, in exact order that he related the sayings or deeds of Christ. For he neither heard the Lord nor accompanied Him. But afterwards, as I said, he accompanied Peter, who accommodated his instructions to the necessities [of his hearers], but with no intention of giving a normal or chronological narrative of the Lord's sayings. Wherefore Mark made no mistake in thus writing some things as he remembered them. For of one thing he took especial care, not to omit anything he had heard, and not to put anything fictional into the statements.

Clement of Alexandria in the fragments of his work Hypotyposes (AD 190) preserved and cited by the historian Eusebius in his Church History (VI, 14: 6) writes that:

As Peter had preached the Word publicly at Rome, and declared the Gospel by the Spirit, many who were present requested that Mark, who had followed him for a long time and remembered his sayings, should write them out. And having composed the Gospel he gave it to those who had requested it.

Also, Irenaeus wrote about this tradition:

After their (Peter and Paul's) passing, Mark also, the disciple and interpreter of Peter, transmitted to us in writing the things preached by Peter.

Based on these quotes, and on the Christian tradition, the information in Mark's gospel about Peter would be based on eyewitness material. The gospel itself is anonymous, as it was common for ancient biographers (ex. Plutarch) to not name their authors. The authorship of Mark and connection to Peter remains debated in scholarship. The above passages are the oldest surviving written testimony to its authorship.

=== Pseudepigrapha and apocrypha ===
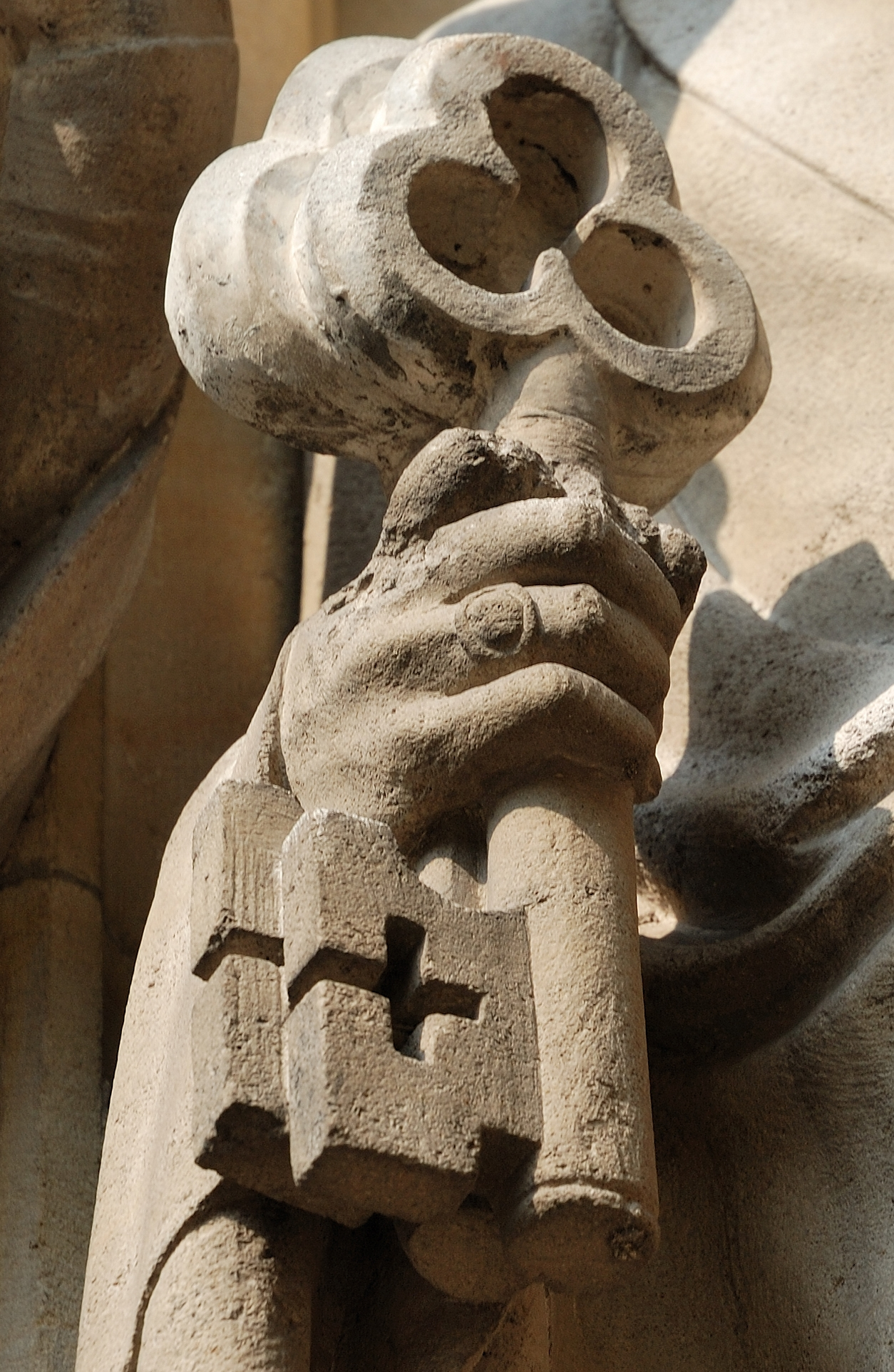
The key as symbol of St. Peter

There are also a number of other apocryphal writings which have been either attributed to or written about Peter. These include:

- Gospel of Peter, a partially Docetic narrative that has survived in part;
- Acts of Peter;
- Acts of Peter and Andrew;
- Acts of Peter and Paul;
- Acts of Peter and the Twelve;
- Gnostic Apocalypse of Peter;
- A Letter of Peter to Philip, which was preserved in the Nag Hammadi library;
- Apocalypse of Peter, which was considered as genuine by many Christians as late as the 4th century;
- Apocalypse of Simeon Kepha;
- Preaching of Peter, a 2nd-century writing, only fragments survived;
- The Epistula Petri, the introductory letter ascribed to the Apostle Peter that appears at the beginning of at least one version of the Clementine literature.

=== Non-canonical sayings of Peter ===
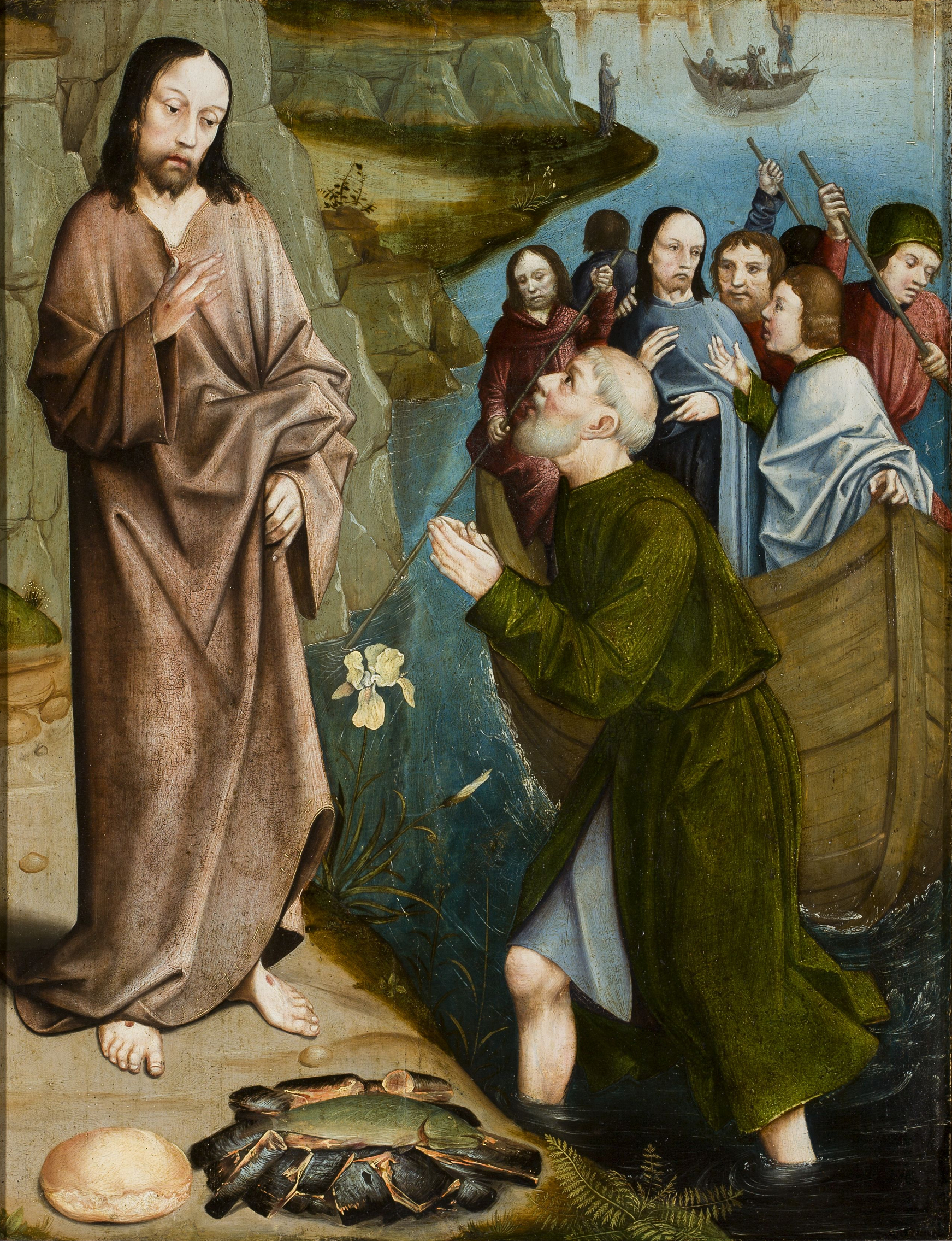
Miraculous catch of fish, c. 1510

Two sayings are attributed to Peter in the Gnostic Gospel of Thomas. In the first, Peter compares Jesus to a "just messenger". In the second, Peter asks Jesus to "make Mary leave us, for females don't deserve life." In the Apocalypse of Peter, Peter holds a dialogue with Jesus about the parable of the fig tree and the fate of sinners.

In the Gospel of Mary, whose text is largely fragmented, Peter appears to be jealous of "Mary" (probably Mary Magdalene). He says to the other disciples, "Did He really speak privately with a woman and not openly to us? Are we to turn about and all listen to her? Did He prefer her to us?" In reply to this, Levi says, "Peter, you have always been hot tempered". Other noncanonical texts that attribute sayings to Peter include the Secret Book of James and the Acts of Peter.

In the Fayyum Fragment, which dates to the end of the 3rd century, Jesus predicts that Peter will deny him three times before a cock crows on the following morning. The account is similar to that of the canonical gospels, especially the Gospel of Mark. It is unclear whether the fragment is an abridged version of the accounts in the synoptic gospels, or a source text on which they were based, perhaps the apocryphal Gospel of Peter.

The fragmentary Gospel of Peter contains an account of the death of Jesus differing significantly from the canonical gospels. It contains little information about Peter himself, except that after the discovery of the empty tomb, "I, Simon Peter, and Andrew my brother, took our fishing nets and went to the sea."

== Iconography ==
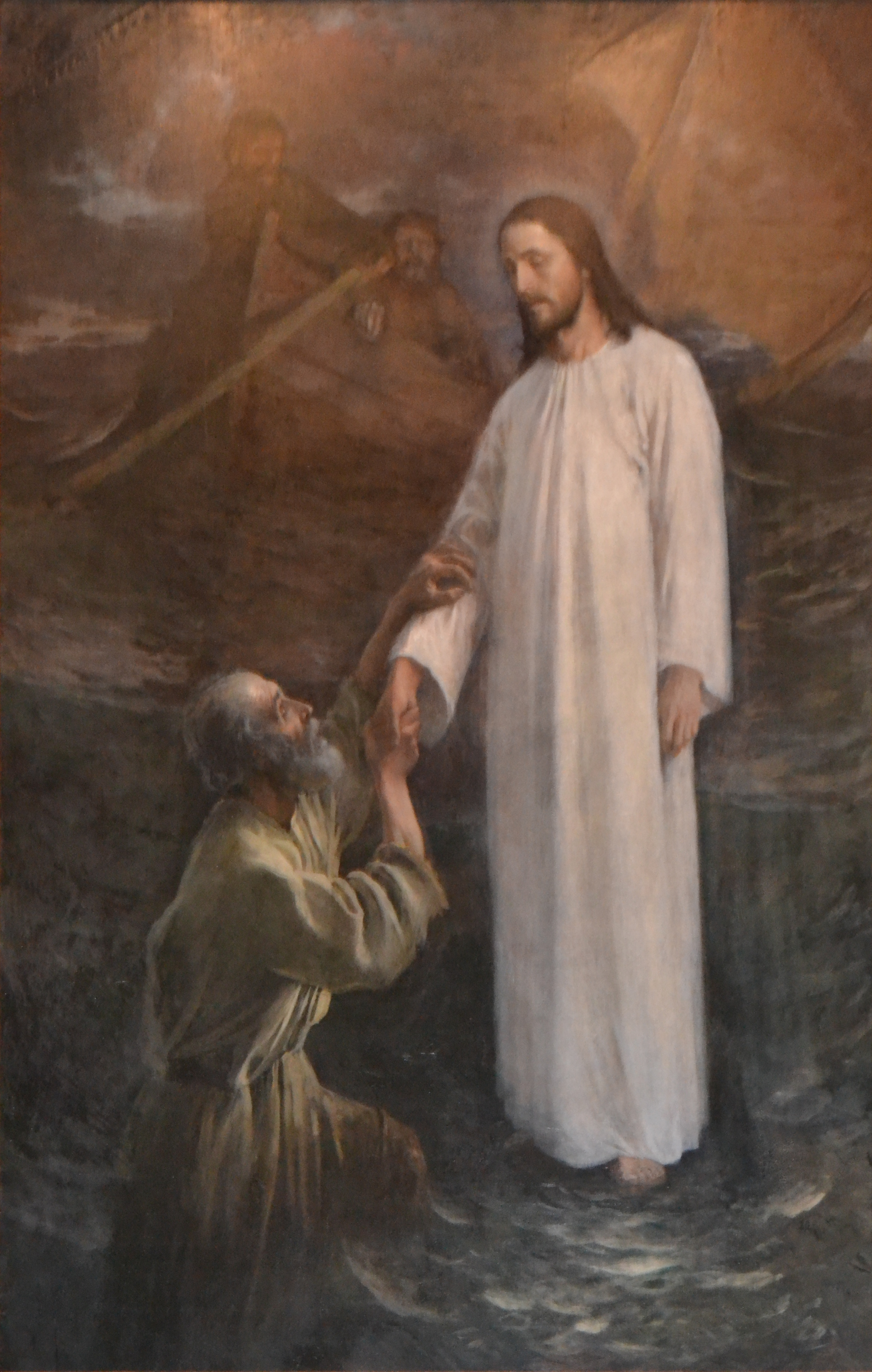
Saint Peter sinking on water by Eero Järnefelt (1892)

The earliest portrait of Peter dates back to the 4th century and was located in 2010. In traditional iconography, Peter has consistently been shown since early Christian art as an oldish, thick-set man with a "slightly combative" face and a short beard, and usually white hair, sometimes balding. He contrasts with Paul the Apostle who is bald except at the sides, with a longer beard and often black hair, and thinner in the face. One exception to this is in Anglo-Saxon art, where he typically lacks a beard. Both Peter and Paul are shown as early as in the 4th century Catacombs of Marcellinus and Peter in Rome.

Later, in the Middle Ages, his attribute is one or two large keys in his hand or hanging from his belt, first seen in the early 8th century. More than many medieval attributes, this continued to be depicted in the Renaissance and afterwards. By the 15th century Peter is more likely to be bald on the top of his head in the Western church, but he continues to have a good head of hair in Orthodox icons.

The depiction of Saint Peter as literally the keeper of the gates of heaven, popular with modern cartoonists, is not found in traditional religious art, but Peter usually heads groups of saints flanking God in heaven, on the right side (viewer's left) of God. Narrative images of Peter include several scenes from the Life of Christ where he is mentioned in the gospels, and he is often identifiable in scenes where his presence is not specifically mentioned. Usually, he stands nearest to Christ.

Depictions of the Arrest of Christ usually include Peter cutting off the ear of one of the soldiers. Scenes without Jesus include his distinctive martyrdom, his rescue from prison, and sometimes his trial. During the Counter-Reformation, scenes of Peter hearing the cock crow for the third time became popular, as a representation of repentance and hence the Catholic sacrament of Confession or Reconciliation.

== Patronage ==
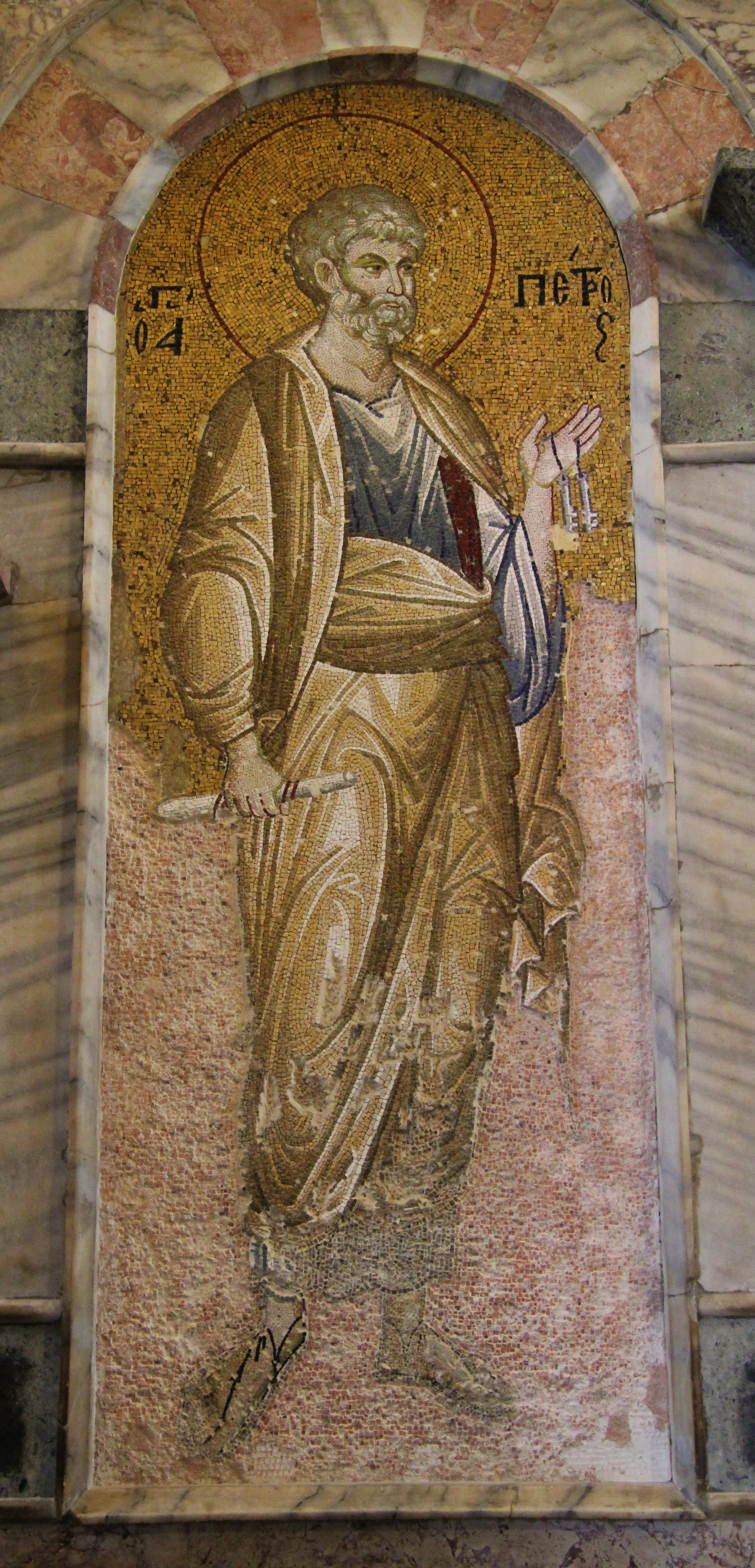
A medieval mosaic of Saint Peter in the Chora Church, Istanbul

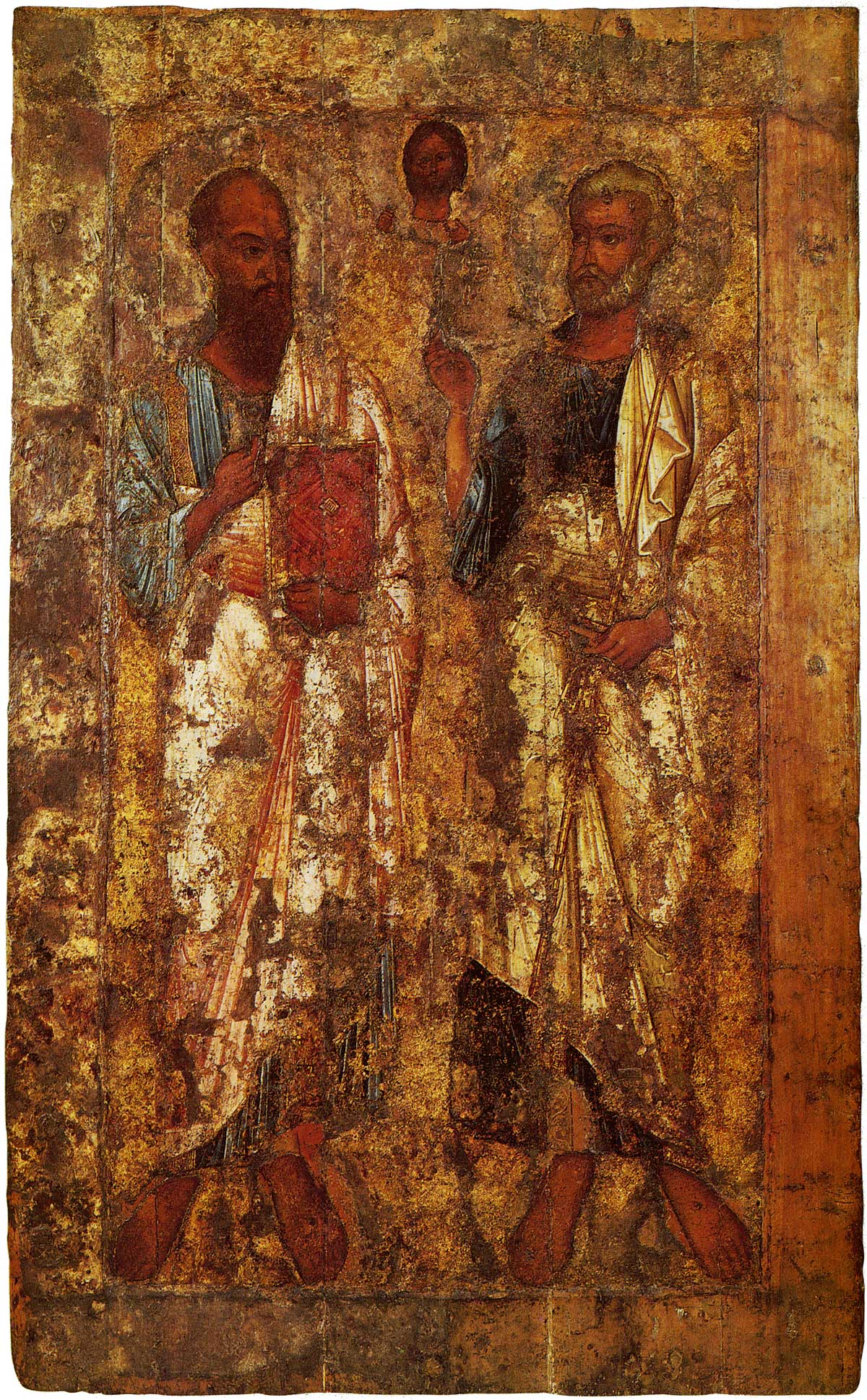
Icon of Saints Peter and Paul

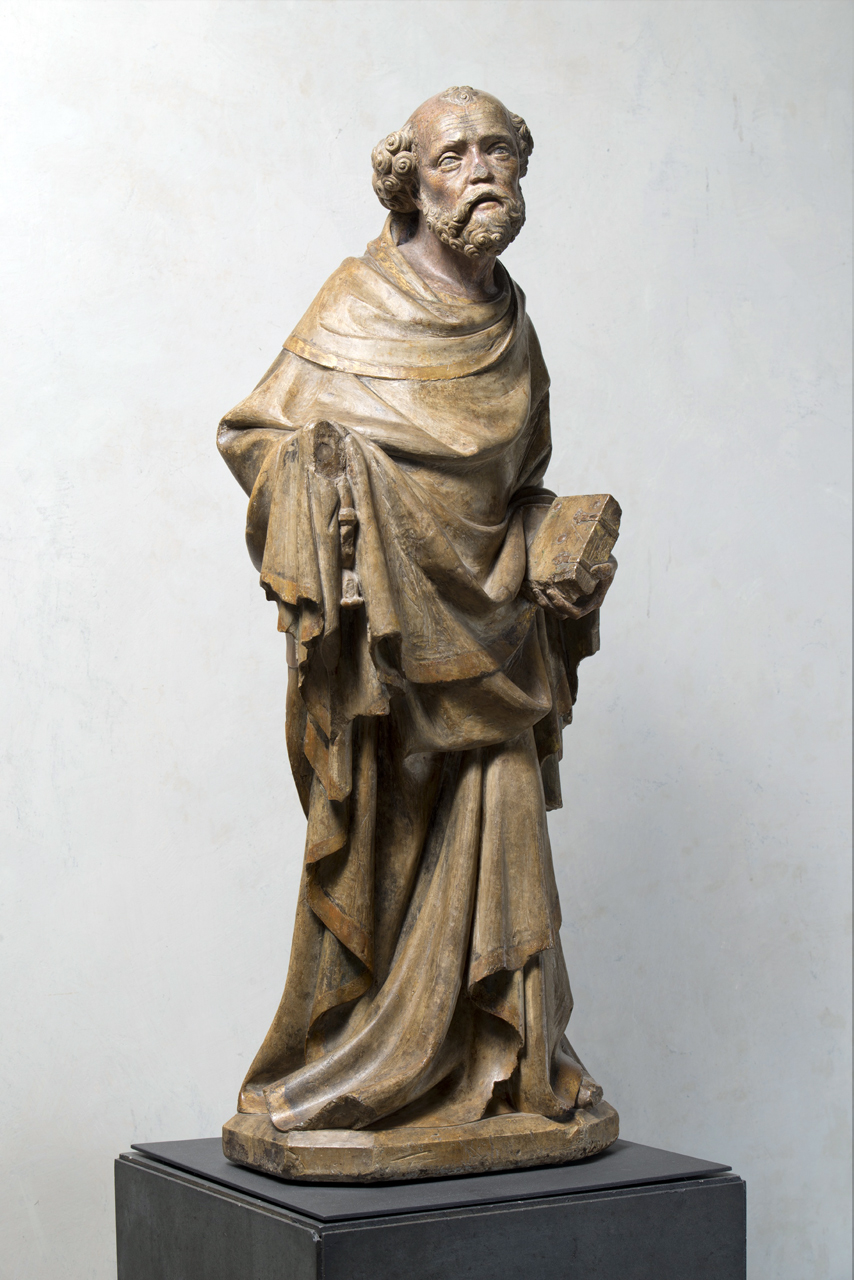
St. Peter of Slivice

Workers
Bakers; Bridge builders; Butchers; Fishermen; Harvesters	Cordwainers; Horologists; Locksmiths; Cobblers	Net makers; Shipwrights; Stationers
Called for aid in
Frenzy; Foot problems	Fever	Longevity
Institutions
The Papacy; The Patriarchate of Antioch; Berchtesgaden Provostry; Bishop Cotton Boys' School, Bangalore	Exeter College, Oxford; Universalist Church	Peterhouse, Cambridge, UK; St Peter's College, Oxford, UK; St Peter's College, Auckland, New Zealand; St Peter's College, Radley, UK; St Peter's School, York, UK; Saint Peter's University, New Jersey, US; St Peter's College, Adelaide, Australia
Churches and cathedrals
The Papal Basilica of Saint Peter, Vatican City; Bath Abbey; York Minster; List of churches dedicated to St Peter
Locations
Apalit; Barotac Viejo; Birżebbuġa; Bremen; Calatrava; Calauag; Calbayog; Chartres; Chimbote; Cologne; Davao; Dunajská Streda; Évora; Hinton on the Green; Ilovik i Sveti Petar; Jackson; Köpenick	Las Vegas; Leuven; Leiden; Lessines; Loboc; Maralal; Marquette; Moissac; Nadur; Naumburg; Obermarsberg; Peterborough; Philadelphia; Póvoa de Varzim; Poznań; Providence; Pubnico	Regensburg; Rio Grande do Sul; Rome; St. Petersburg, Florida; Saint Petersburg, Russia; Saint Pierre and Miquelon; San Pedro, Laguna; San Pedro Soloma; Scranton; Seixal Municipality; Sunderland; Sintra; Sint-Pieters-Rode; Siuntio; Tielt; Toa Baja; Trier; Umbria; Worms

== Nontraditional views ==
L. Michael White suggests that there was a serious division between Peter's Jewish Christian party and Paul's Hellenizing party, seen in, e.g., the Incident at Antioch, which later Christian accounts have downplayed.

A view was developed by the supporters of the Christ myth theory, which holds that the figure of Peter is largely a development from mythological doorkeeper figures. According to Arthur Drews and George Albert Wells, if there was a historical Peter, then all that is known about him is the brief mentions in the Epistle to the Galatians.

== See also ==
- List of biblical figures identified in extra-biblical sources
- List of Catholic saints
- List of Eastern Orthodox saints
- List of popes
- San Pietro in Vincoli
- Sword of Saint Peter

== Bibliography ==
- Bockmuehl, Markus N. A. (2010). The Remembered Peter - In Ancient Reception and Modern Debate. Mohr Siebeck.
- Dunn, James D. G. (2001). "Has the Canon a Continuing Function". In Lee Martin McDonald; James A. Sanders (eds.). The Canon Debate. Baker. ISBN 978-1-4412-4163-4.
- Hitchcock, Susan Tyler; Tutu, Mpho; Esposito, John L. (2004). Geography of Religion - Where God Lives, where Pilgrims Walk. National Geographic. ISBN 978-0-7922-7317-2.
- Jobes, Karen (2005). Baker Exegetical Commentary on the New Testament: 1 Peter. Baker Publishing Group.
- Kruger, Michael J. (1999). "The Authenticity of 2 Peter". Journal of Evangelical Society. 42 (4): 645–671.
- Lüdemann, Gerd; Özen, Alf (1996). De opstanding van Jezus - Een historische benadering (Was mit Jesus wirklich geschah. Die Auferstehung historisch betrachtet / The Resurrection of Christ: A Historical Inquiry). Averbode. ISBN 978-9-02594-665-4.
- Pagels, Elaine (2005). De Gnostische Evangelien (The Gnostic Gospels). Servire.

Catholic Church titles
Preceded by Debut	Pope before 64	Succeeded by Linus
Preceded by Debut	Bishop of Antioch; 37–53	Succeeded by Evodius
