= Icon =

Religious work of art in Christianity

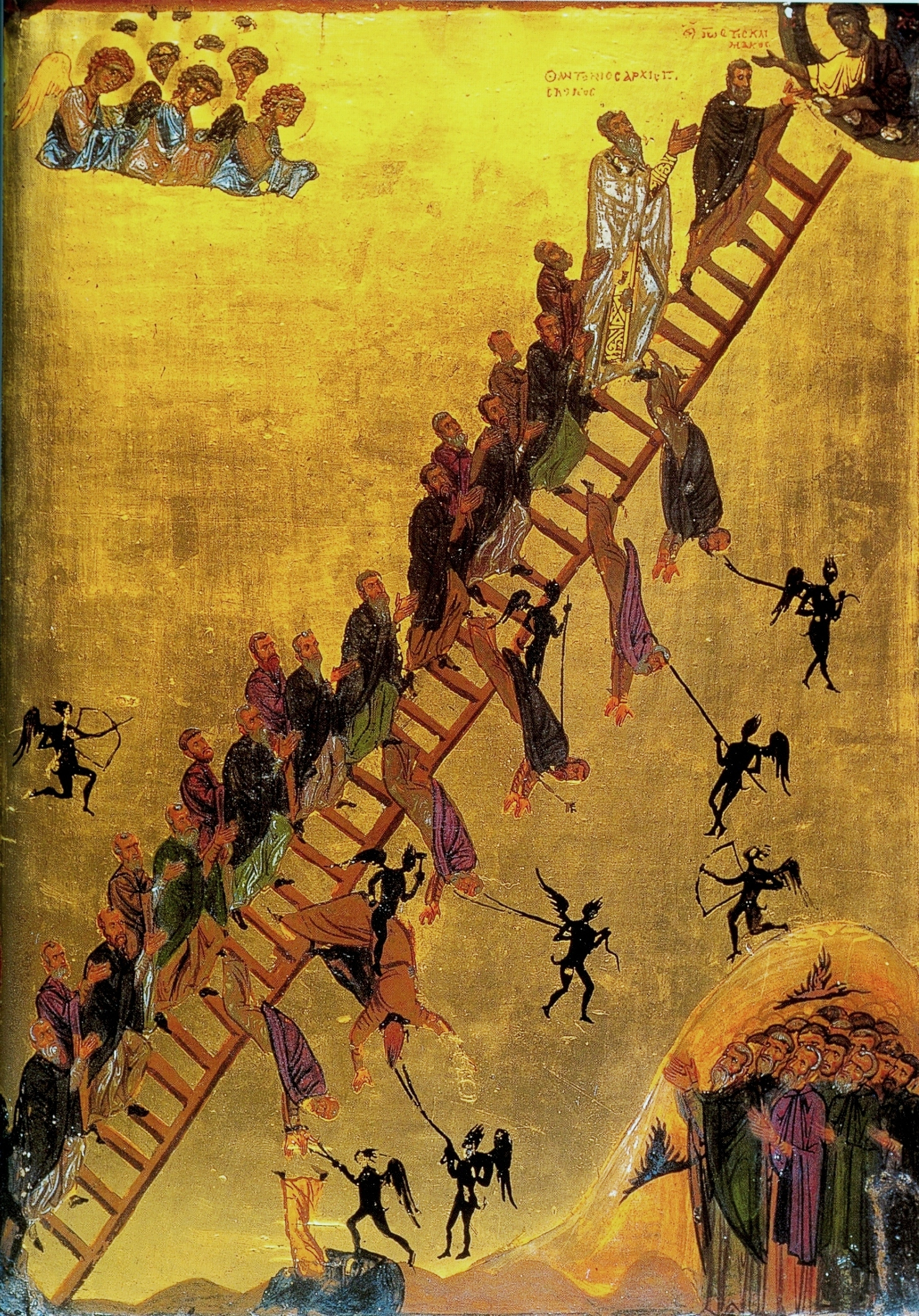
The Ladder of Divine Ascent depicts monks ascending to Jesus in heaven in the top right. 12th century, Saint Catherine's Monastery.

An icon (Note: from Ancient Greek εἰκών (eikṓn) 'image, resemblance') is a religious work of art, most commonly a painting, in the cultures of the Eastern Orthodox, Oriental Orthodox, Catholic, and Lutheran churches. The most common subjects include Jesus, Mary, saints, and angels. Although especially associated with portrait style images concentrating on one or two main figures, the term also covers most of the religious images in a variety of artistic media produced by Eastern Christianity, including narrative scenes, usually from the Bible or the lives of saints.

Icons are most commonly painted on wood panels with egg tempera, but they may also be cast in metal or carved in stone or embroidered on cloth or done in mosaic or fresco work or printed on paper or metal, etc. Comparable images from Western Christianity may be classified as "icons", although "iconic" may also be used to describe the static style of a devotional image. In the Greek language, the term for icon painting uses the same word as for "writing", and Orthodox sources often translate it into English as icon writing.

Eastern Orthodox tradition holds that the production of Christian images dates back to the very early days of Christianity, and that it has been a continuous tradition since then. Modern academic art history considers that, while images may have existed earlier, the tradition can be traced back only as far as the 3rd century, and that the images which survive from Early Christian art often differ greatly from later ones. The icons of later centuries can be linked, often closely, to images from the 5th century onwards, though very few of these survive. Widespread destruction of images occurred during the Byzantine Iconoclasm of 726–842, although this did settle permanently the question of the appropriateness of images. Since then, icons have had a great continuity of style and subject, far greater than in the icons of the Western church. At the same time there has been change and development.

== History ==
=== Emergence of the icon ===
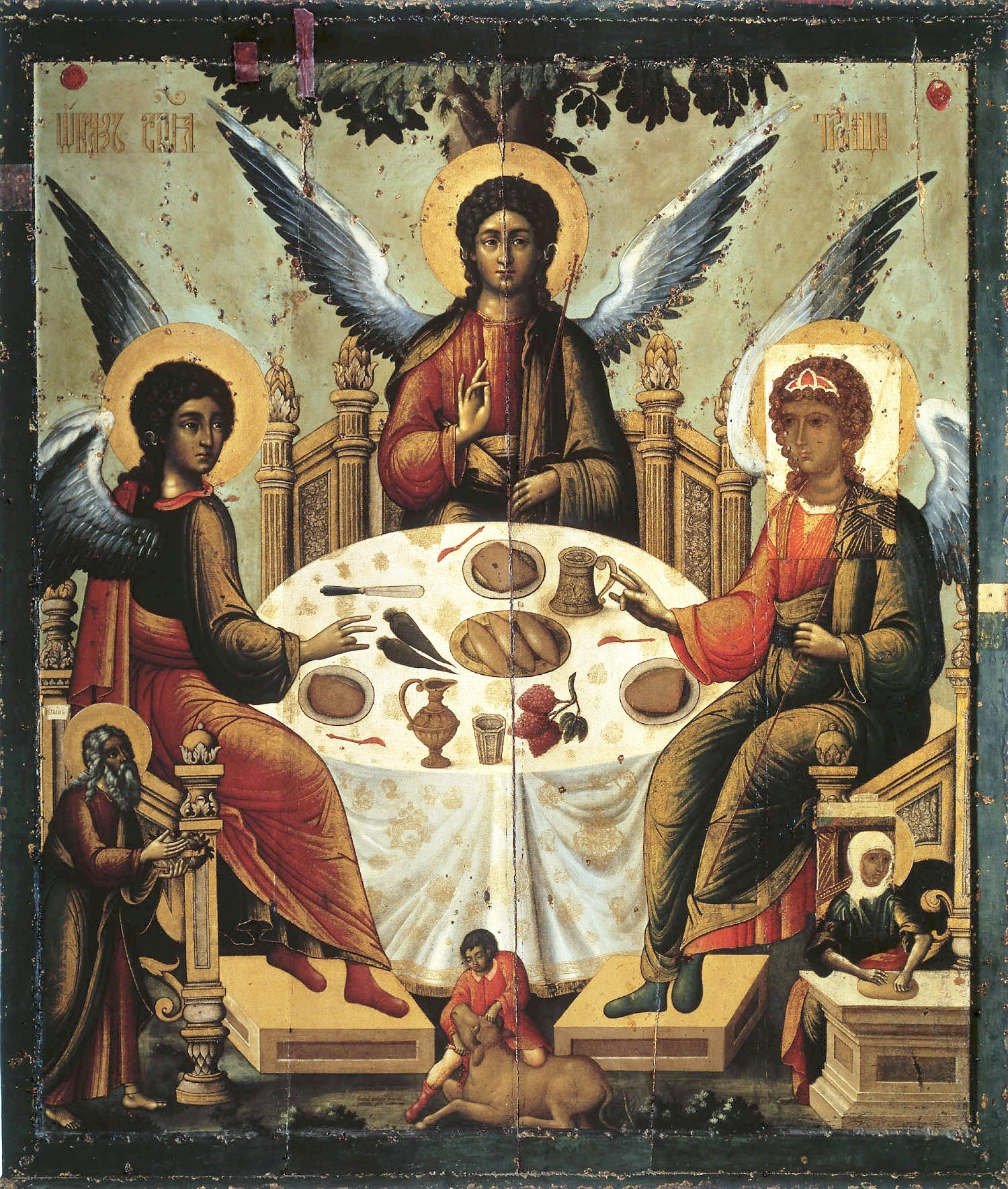
Russian icon of the Holy Trinity

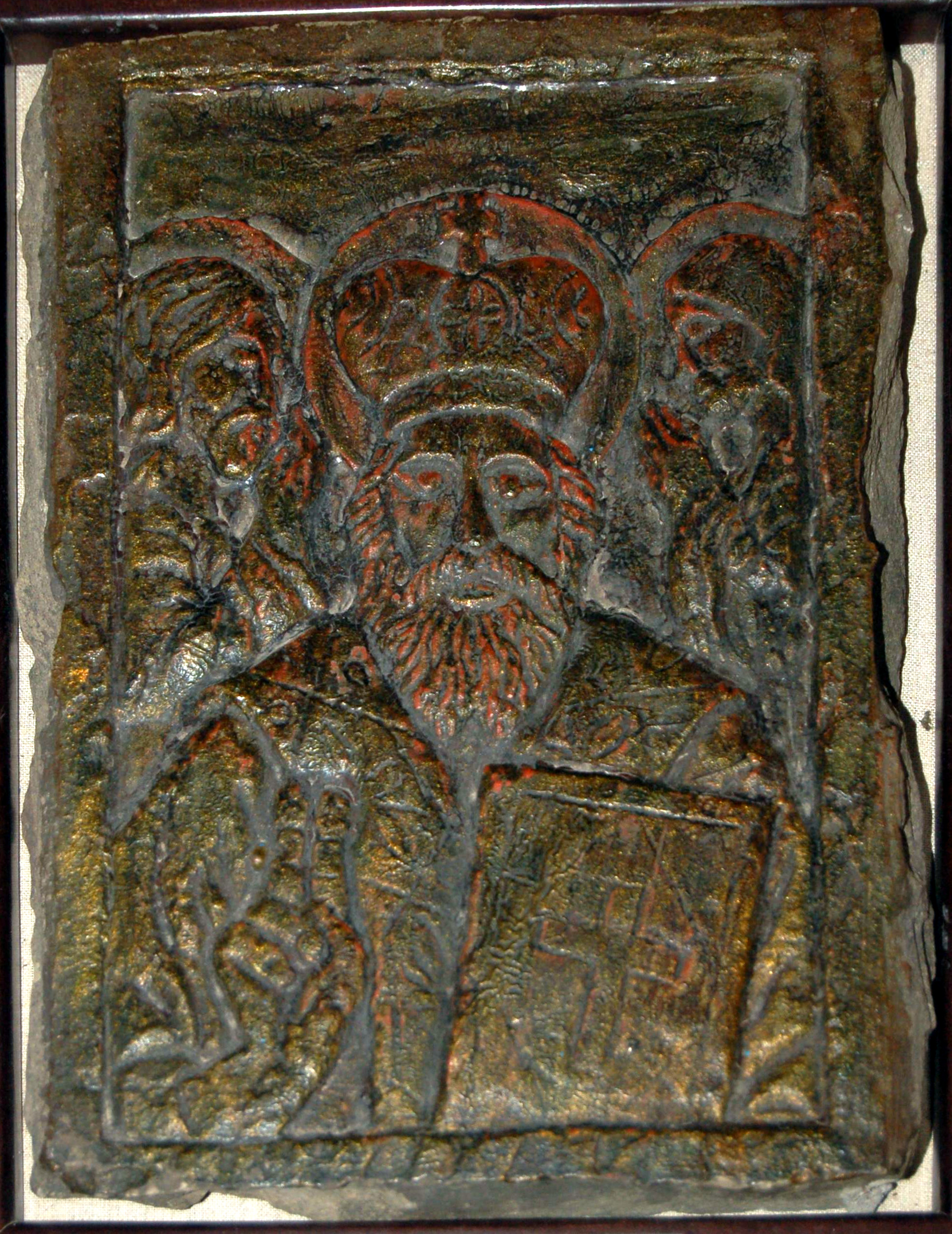
The icon of St Nicolas carved in stone (between c. 12 and 15th centuries), at the Radomysl Castle, in Ukraine

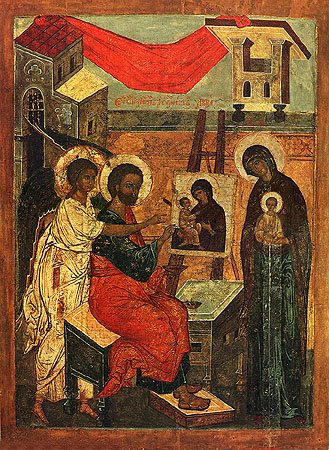
Luke painting the Theotokos of Vladimir (16th century, Pskov)

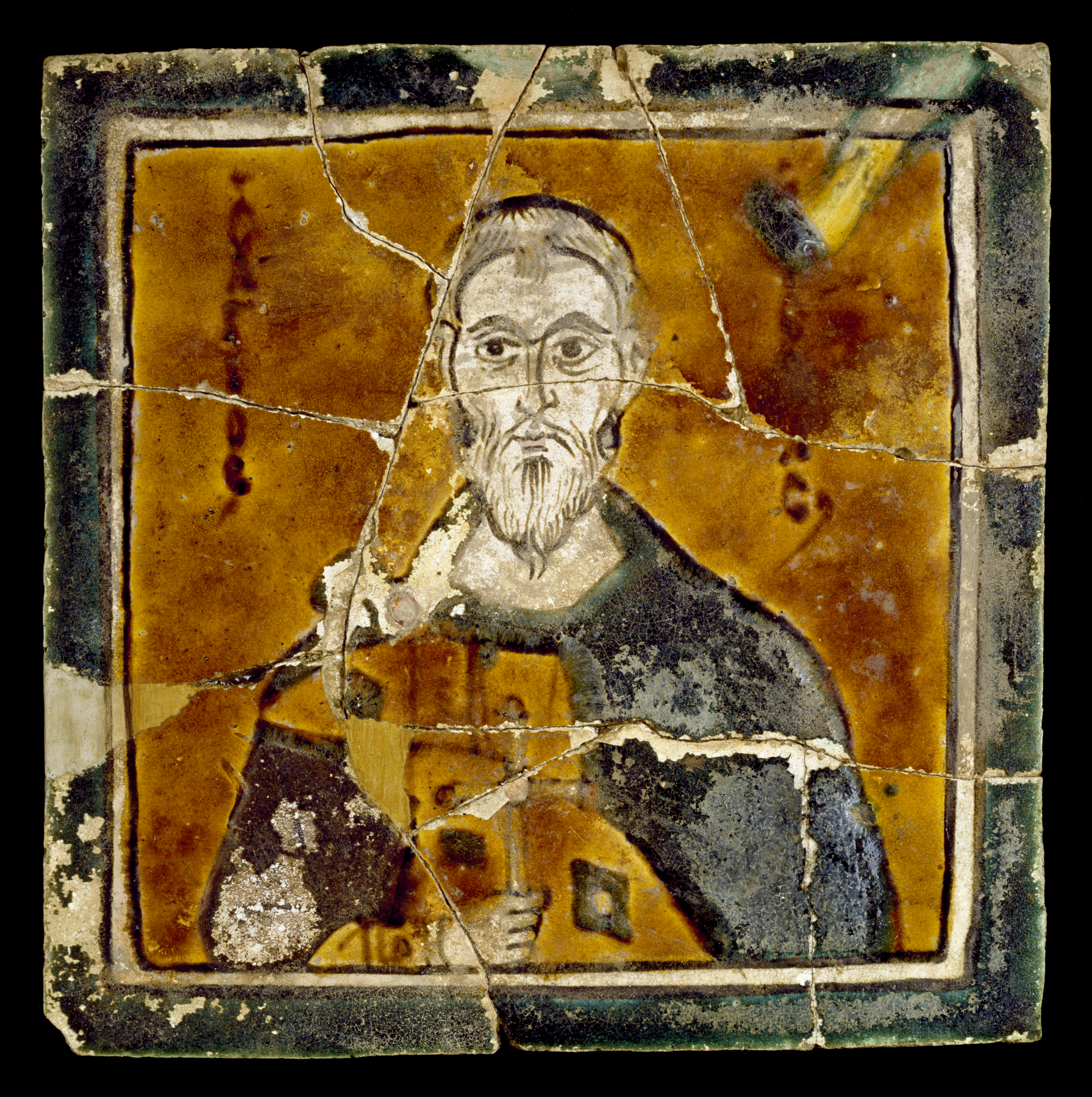
A rare ceramic icon depicting Saint Arethas (Byzantine, 10th century)

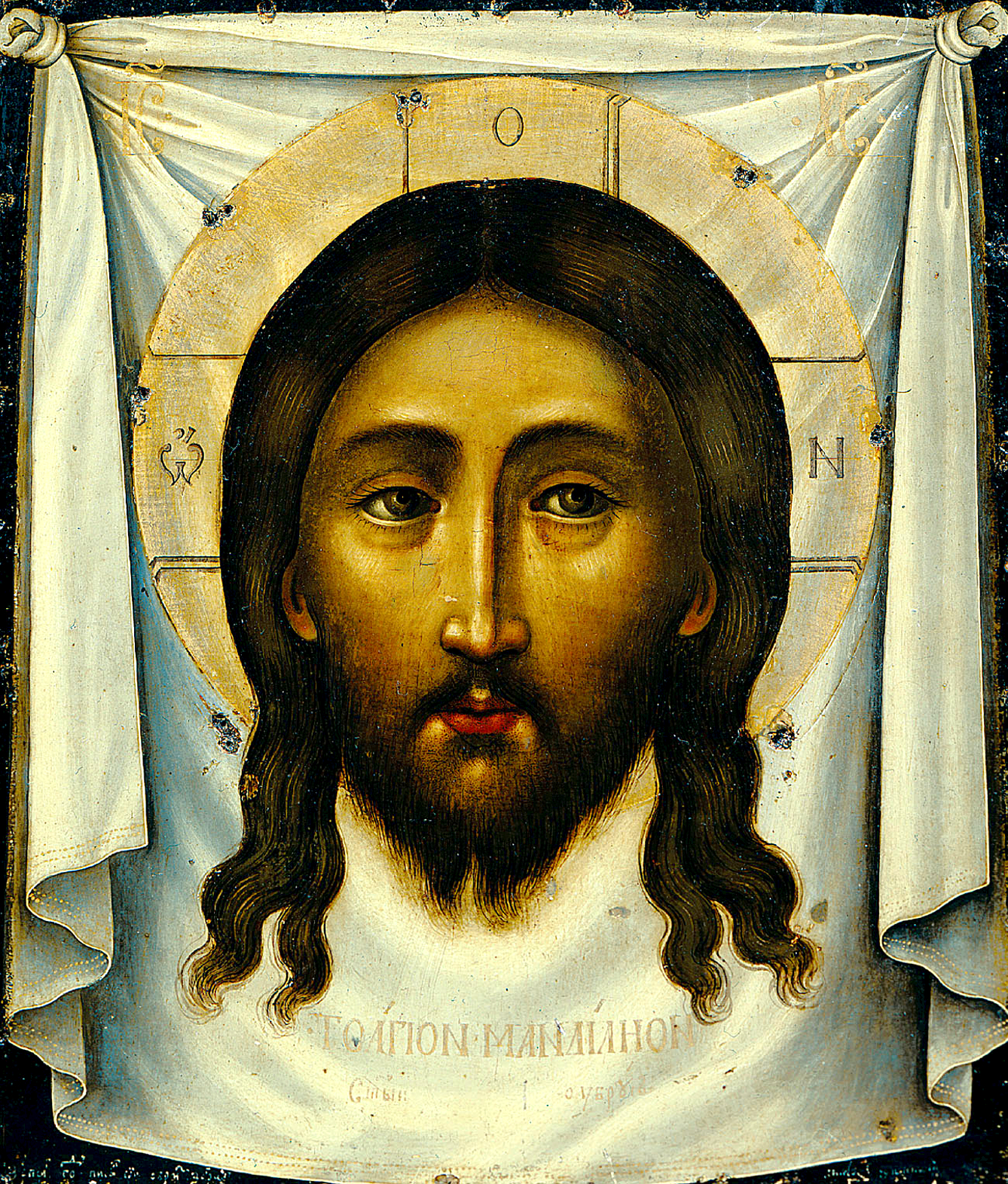
Image of the Saviour Not Made by Hand: a traditional Orthodox iconography in the interpretation of Simon Ushakov (1658).

==== Origins in primitive Christianity in the first century ====
Pre-Christian religions had produced and used art works. Statues and paintings of various gods and deities were regularly worshiped and venerated. It is unclear when Christians took up such activities. Christian tradition dating from the 8th century identifies Luke the Evangelist as the first icon painter, but this might not reflect historical facts. A general assumption that early Christianity was generally aniconic, opposed to religious imagery in both theory and practice until about 200, has been challenged by Paul Corby Finney's analysis of early Christian writing and material remains (1994). His assumption distinguishes three different sources of attitudes affecting early Christians on the issue: "first that humans could have a direct vision of God; second that they could not; and, third, that although humans could see God they were best advised not to look, and were strictly forbidden to represent what they had seen".

These derived respectively from Greek and Near Eastern pagan religions, from Ancient Greek philosophy, and from the Jewish tradition and the Old Testament. Of the three, Finney concludes that "overall, Israel's aversion to sacred images influenced early Christianity considerably less than the Greek philosophical tradition of invisible deity apophatically defined", so placing less emphasis on the Jewish background of most of the first Christians than most traditional accounts.

Finney suggests that "the reasons for the non-appearance of Christian art before 200 have nothing to do with principled aversion to art, with other-worldliness, or with anti-materialism. The truth is simple and mundane: Christians lacked land and capital. Art requires both. As soon as they began to acquire land and capital, Christians began to experiment with their own distinctive forms of art".

Aside from the legend that Pilate had made an image of Christ, the 4th-century Eusebius of Caesarea, in his Church History, provides a more substantial reference to a "first" icon of Jesus. He relates that King Abgar of Edessa (died c. 50 CE) sent a letter to Jesus at Jerusalem, asking Jesus to come and heal him of an illness. This version of the Abgar story does not mention an image. A later account found in the Syriac Doctrine of Addai (c. 400?) mentions a painted image of Jesus in the story. Even later, in the 6th-century account given by Evagrius Scholasticus, the painted image transforms into an image that miraculously appeared on a towel when Christ pressed the cloth to his wet face. Further legends relate that the cloth remained in Edessa until the 10th century, when it was taken by General John Kourkouas to Constantinople. It went missing in 1204 when Crusaders sacked Constantinople, but by then numerous copies had firmly established its iconic type.

The 4th-century Christian Aelius Lampridius produced the earliest known written records of Christian images treated like icons (in a pagan or Gnostic context) in his Life of Alexander Severus (xxix) that formed part of the Augustan History. According to Lampridius, the emperor Alexander Severus (r. 222–235), himself not a Christian, had kept a domestic chapel for the veneration of images of deified emperors, of portraits of his ancestors, and of Christ, Apollonius, Orpheus and Abraham. Saint Irenaeus, (c. 130–202) in his Against Heresies (1:25;6) says scornfully of the Gnostic Carpocratians:

They also possess images, some of them painted, and others formed from different kinds of material; while they maintain that a likeness of Christ was made by Pilate at that time when Jesus lived among them. They crown these images, and set them up along with the images of the philosophers of the world that is to say, with the images of Pythagoras, and Plato, and Aristotle, and the rest. They have also other modes of honouring these images, after the same manner of the Gentiles [pagans].

On the other hand, Irenaeus does not speak critically of icons or portraits in a general sense—only of certain gnostic sectarians' use of icons.

Another criticism of image veneration appears in the non-canonical 2nd-century Acts of John (generally considered a gnostic work), in which the Apostle John discovers that one of his followers has had a portrait made of him, and is venerating it:

[John] went into the bedchamber, and saw the portrait of an old man crowned with garlands, and lamps and altars set before it. And he called him and said: Lycomedes, what do you mean by this matter of the portrait? Can it be one of thy gods that is painted here? For I see that you are still living in heathen fashion.

— Acts of John, 27

Later in the passage John says, "But this that you have now done is childish and imperfect: you have drawn a dead likeness of the dead."

At least some of the hierarchy of the Christian churches still strictly opposed icons in the early 4th century. At the Spanish non-ecumenical Synod of Elvira (c. 305) bishops concluded, "Pictures are not to be placed in churches, so that they do not become objects of worship and adoration".

Bishop Epiphanius of Salamis, wrote his letter 51 to John, Bishop of Jerusalem (c. 394) in which he recounted how he tore down an image in a church and admonished the other bishop that such images are "opposed [...] to our religion".

==== Icons in Eusebius to Philostorgius (425 AD) ====
Elsewhere in his Church History, Eusebius reports seeing what he took to be portraits of Jesus, Peter and Paul, and also mentions a bronze statue at Banias/Paneas under Mount Hermon, of which he wrote, "They say that this statue is an image of Jesus". Further, he relates that locals regarded the image as a memorial of the healing of the woman with an issue of blood by Jesus (Luke 8:43–48), because it depicted a standing man wearing a double cloak and with arm outstretched, and a woman kneeling before him with arms reaching out as if in supplication.

John Francis Wilson suggests the possibility that this refers to a pagan bronze statue whose true identity had been forgotten. Some have thought it to represent Aesculapius, the Greek god of healing, but the description of the standing figure and the woman kneeling in supplication precisely matches images found on coins depicting the bearded emperor Hadrian (r. 117–138) reaching out to a female figure—symbolizing a province—kneeling before him.

When asked by Constantia (Emperor Constantine's half-sister) for an image of Jesus, Eusebius denied the request, replying: "To depict purely the human form of Christ before its transformation, on the other hand, is to break the commandment of God and to fall into pagan error." Hence Jaroslav Pelikan calls Eusebius "the father of iconoclasm".

After the emperor Constantine I extended official toleration of Christianity within the Roman Empire in 313, huge numbers of pagans became converts. This period of the Historiography of Christianization of the Roman Empire probably saw the use of Christian images become very widespread among the faithful, though with great differences from pagan habits. Robin Lane Fox states "By the early fifth century, we know of the ownership of private icons of saints; by c. 480–500, we can be sure that the inside of a saint's shrine would be adorned with images and votive portraits, a practice which had probably begun earlier."

When Constantine himself (r. 306–337) apparently converted to Christianity, the majority of his subjects remained pagans. The Roman Imperial cult of the divinity of the emperor, expressed through the traditional burning of candles and the offering of incense to the emperor's image, was tolerated for a period because it would have been politically dangerous to attempt to suppress it. In the 5th century the courts of justice and municipal buildings of the empire still honoured the portrait of the reigning emperor in this way.

In 425 Philostorgius, an allegedly Arian Christian, charged the Orthodox Christians in Constantinople with idolatry because they still honored the image of the emperor Constantine the Great in this way. Dix notes that this occurred more than a century before the first extant reference to a similar honouring of the image of Jesus or of his apostles or saints known today, but that it would seem a natural progression for the image of Christ, the King of Heaven and Earth, to be paid similar veneration as that given to the earthly Roman emperor. However, the Orthodox, Eastern Catholics, Eastern Lutherans, and other groups insist on explicitly distinguishing the veneration of icons from the worship of idols by pagans.

=== Theodosius to Justinian ===
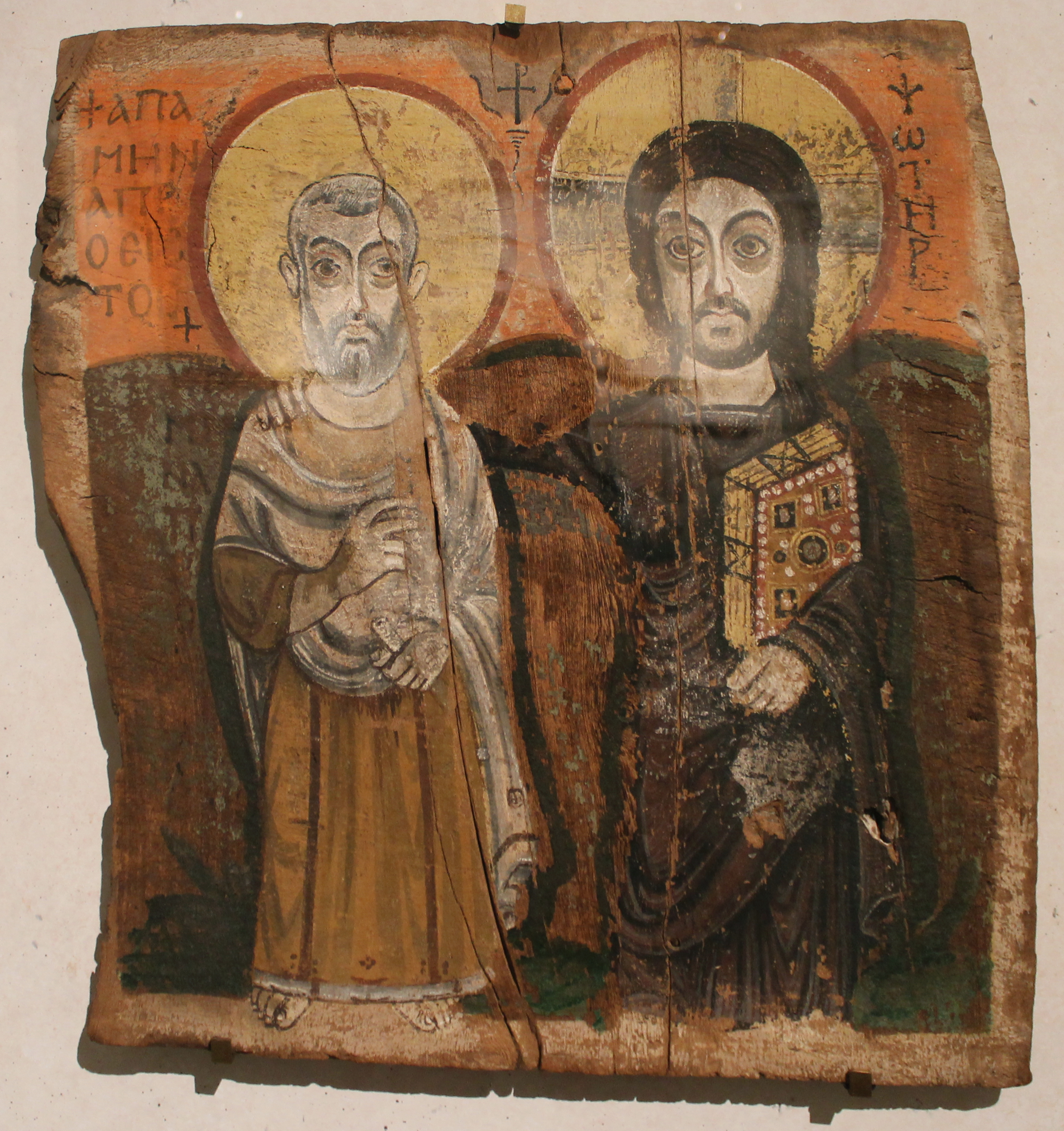
Christ and Saint Menas, 6th-century Coptic icon from Egypt (Musée du Louvre)

After adoption of Christianity as the only permissible Roman state religion under Theodosius I, Christian art began to change not only in quality and sophistication, but also in nature. This was in no small part due to Christians being free for the first time to express their faith openly without persecution from the state, in addition to the faith spreading to the non-poor segments of society. Paintings of martyrs and their feats began to appear, and early writers commented on their lifelike effect, one of the elements a few Christian writers criticized in pagan art—the ability to imitate life. The writers mostly criticized pagan works of art for pointing to false gods, thus encouraging idolatry. Statues in the round were avoided as being too close to the principal artistic focus of pagan cult practices, as they have continued to be (with some small-scale exceptions) throughout the history of Eastern Christianity.

Nilus of Sinai (d. c. 430), in his Letter to Heliodorus Silentiarius, records a miracle in which Saint Plato of Ankyra appeared to a Christian in a dream. The saint was recognized because the young man had often seen his portrait. This recognition of a religious apparition from likeness to an image was also a characteristic of pagan pious accounts of appearances of gods to humans, and was a regular topos in hagiography. One critical recipient of a vision from Saint Demetrius of Thessaloniki apparently specified that the saint resembled the "more ancient" images of him—presumably the 7th-century mosaics still in Hagios Demetrios. Another, an African bishop, had been rescued from Arab slavery by a young soldier called Demetrios, who told him to go to his house in Thessaloniki. Having discovered that most young soldiers in the city seemed to be called Demetrios, he gave up and went to the largest church in the city, to find his rescuer on the wall.

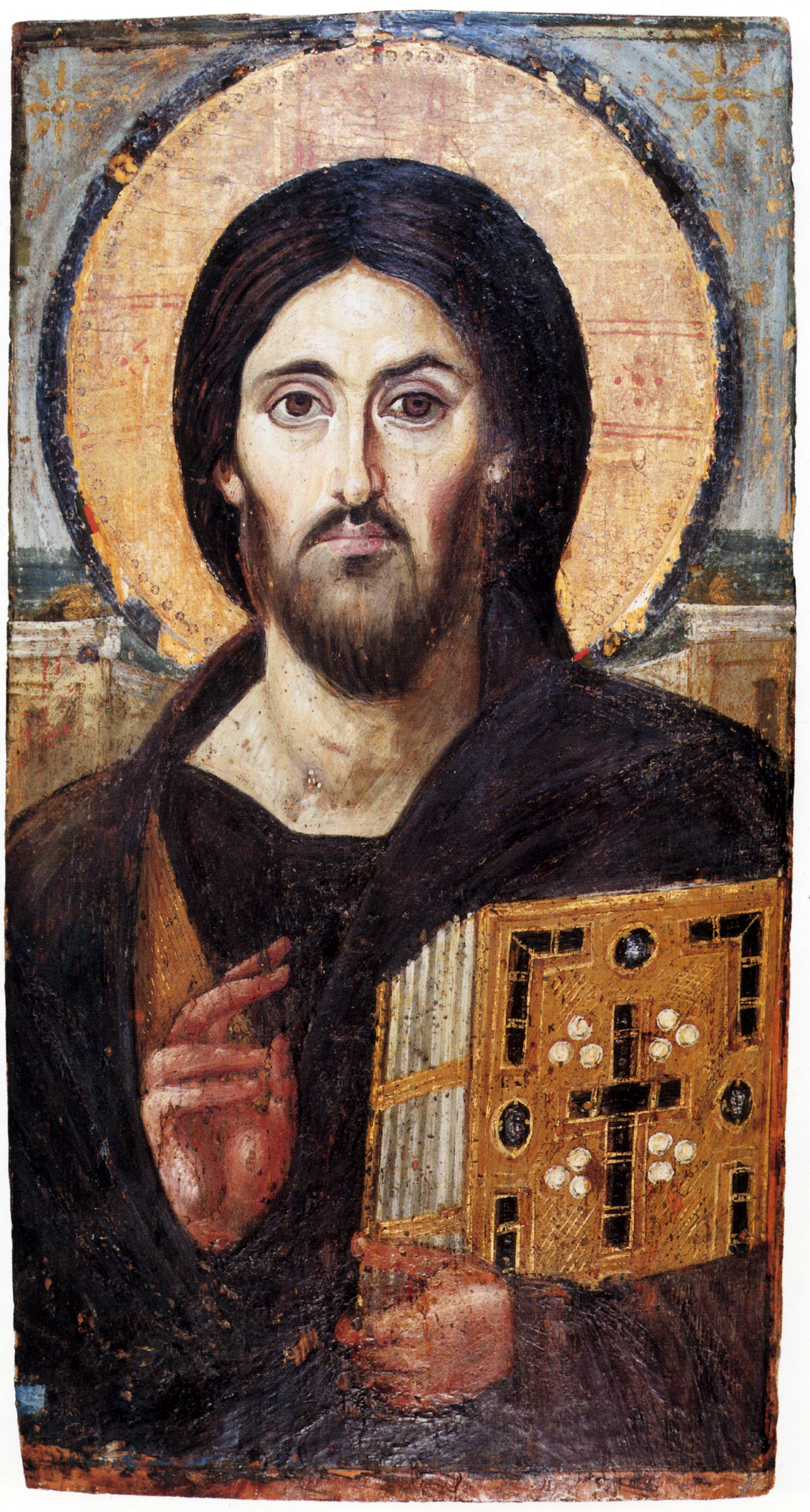
The oldest surviving icon of Christ Pantocrator, encaustic on panel, c. 6th century (Saint Catherine's Monastery, Mount Sinai)

During this period the church began to discourage all non-religious human images—the Emperor and donor figures counting as religious. This became largely effective, so that most of the population would only ever see religious images and those of the ruling class. The word icon referred to any and all images, not just religious ones, but there was barely a need for a separate word for these.

=== Luke's portrait of Mary ===
It is in a context attributed to the 5th century that the first mention of an image of Mary painted from life appears, though earlier paintings on catacomb walls bear resemblance to modern icons of Mary. Theodorus Lector, in his 6th-century History of the Church 1:1 stated that Eudokia (wife of emperor Theodosius II, d. 460) sent an image of the "Mother of God" named Icon of the Hodegetria from Jerusalem to Pulcheria, daughter of Arcadius, the former emperor and father of Theodosius II. The image was specified to have been "painted by the Apostle Luke."

Margherita Guarducci relates a tradition that the original icon of Mary attributed to Luke, sent by Eudokia to Pulcheria from Palestine, was a large circular icon only of her head. When the icon arrived in Constantinople it was fitted in as the head into a very large rectangular icon of her holding the Christ child and it is this composite icon that became the one historically known as the Hodegetria. She further states another tradition that when the last Latin Emperor of Constantinople, Baldwin II, fled Constantinople in 1261 he took this original circular portion of the icon with him.

This remained in the possession of the Angevin dynasty who had it inserted into a much larger image of Mary and the Christ child, which is presently enshrined above the high altar of the Benedictine Abbey church of Montevergine. This icon was subjected to repeated repainting over the subsequent centuries, so that it is difficult to determine what the original image of Mary's face would have looked like. Guarducci states that in 1950 an ancient image of Mary at the Church of Santa Francesca Romana was determined to be a very exact, but reverse mirror image of the original circular icon that was made in the 5th century and brought to Rome, where it has remained until the present.

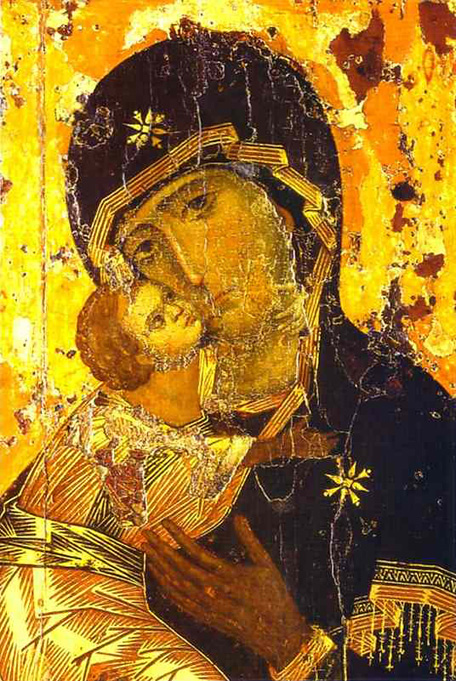
The "Theotokos of Vladimir" icon (12th century) symbol of Russia

In later tradition the number of icons of Mary attributed to Luke greatly multiplied. The Salus Populi Romani, the Theotokos of Vladimir, the Theotokos Iverskaya of Mount Athos, the Theotokos of Tikhvin, the Theotokos of Smolensk and the Black Madonna of Częstochowa are examples, and another is in the cathedral on St Thomas Mount, which is believed to be one of the seven painted by Luke the Evangelist and brought to India by Thomas the Apostle. Ethiopia has at least seven more. Bissera V. Pentcheva concludes, "The myth [of Luke painting an icon] was invented in order to support the legitimacy of icon veneration during the Iconoclastic controversy" (8th and 9th centuries, much later than most art historians put it). According to Reformed Baptist pastor John Carpenter, by claiming the existence of a portrait of the Theotokos painted during her lifetime by the evangelist Luke, the iconodules "fabricated evidence for the apostolic origins and divine approval of images."

In the period before and during the Iconoclastic Controversy, stories attributing the creation of icons to the New Testament period greatly increased, with several apostles and even Mary herself believed to have acted as the artist or commissioner of images (also embroidered in the case of Mary).

=== Iconoclast period ===
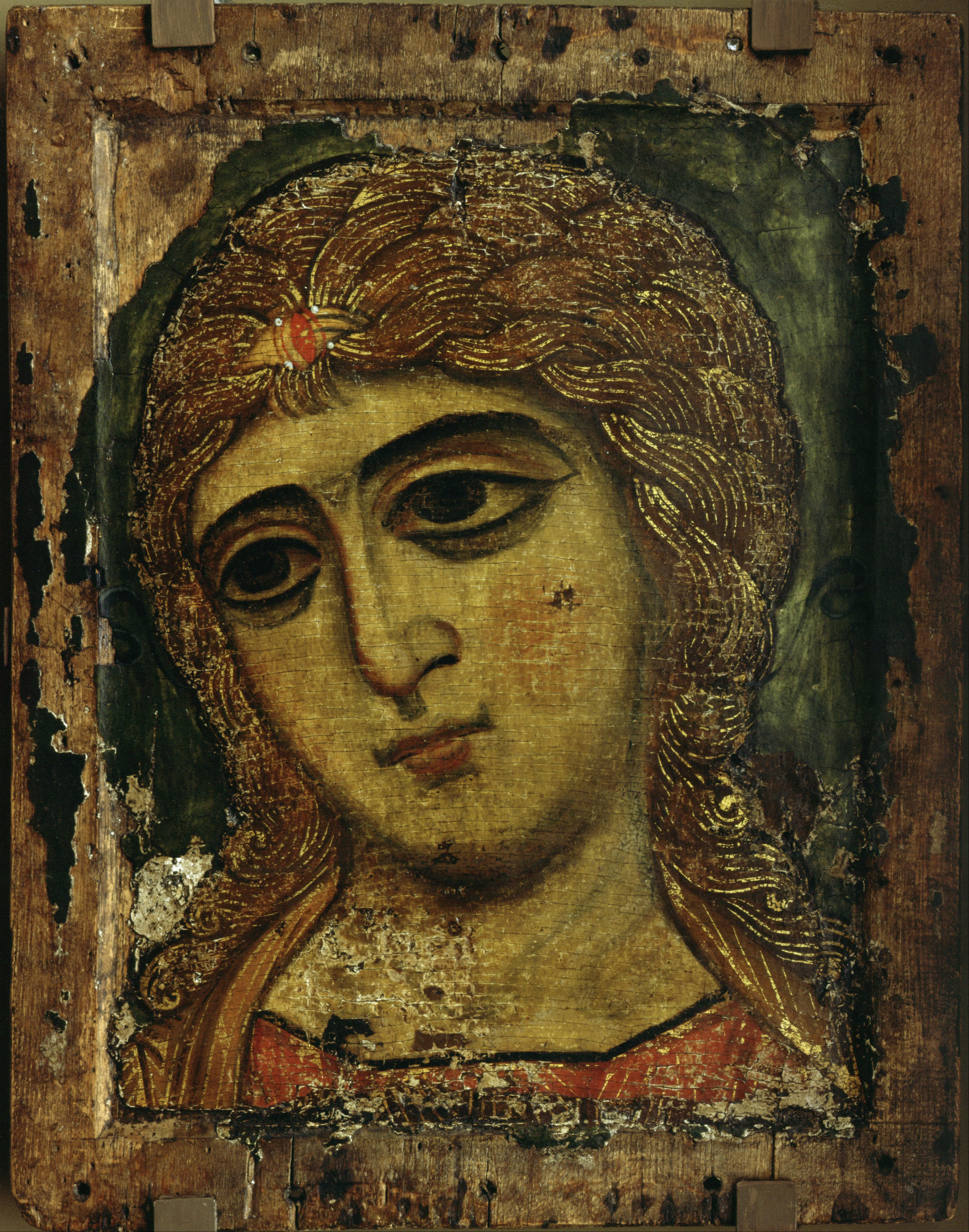
12th-century icon of Archangel Gabriel from Novgorod, called The Angel with Golden Hair, currently exhibited in the State Russian Museum

There was a continuing opposition to images and their misuse within Christianity from very early times. "Whenever images threatened to gain undue influence within the church, theologians have sought to strip them of their power". Further, "there is no century between the fourth and the eighth in which there is not some evidence of opposition to images even within the Church". Nonetheless, popular favor for icons guaranteed their continued existence, while no systematic apologia for or against icons, or doctrinal authorization or condemnation of icons yet existed.

The use of icons was seriously challenged by Byzantine Imperial authority in the 8th century. Though by this time opposition to images was strongly entrenched in Judaism and Islam, attribution of the impetus toward an iconoclastic movement in Eastern Orthodoxy to Muslims or Jews "seems to have been highly exaggerated, both by contemporaries and by modern scholars".

Though significant in the history of religious doctrine, the Byzantine controversy over images is not seen as of primary importance in Byzantine history; "[f]ew historians still hold it to have been the greatest issue of the period".

The Iconoclastic period began when images were banned by Emperor Leo III the Isaurian sometime between 726 and 730. Under his son Constantine V, a council forbidding image veneration was held at Hieria near Constantinople in 754. Image veneration was later reinstated by the Empress Regent Irene, under whom another council was held reversing the decisions of the previous iconoclast council and taking its title as Seventh Ecumenical Council. The council anathemized all who hold to iconoclasm, i.e. those who held that veneration of images constitutes idolatry. Then the ban was enforced again by Leo V in 815. Finally, icon veneration was decisively restored by Empress Regent Theodora in 843 at the Council of Constantinople.

From then on all Byzantine coins had a religious image or symbol on the reverse, usually an image of Christ for larger denominations, with the head of the Emperor on the obverse, reinforcing the bond of the state and the divine order.

== Acheiropoieta ==
The tradition of acheiropoieta (ἀχειροποίητα, literally 'not-made-by-hand') accrued to icons that are alleged to have come into existence miraculously, not by a human painter. Such images functioned as powerful relics as well as icons, and their images were naturally seen as authoritative as to the true appearance of the subject: naturally and especially because of the reluctance to accept mere human productions as embodying anything of the divine, a commonplace of Christian deprecation of man-made "idols". Like icons believed to be painted directly from the live subject, they therefore acted as important references for other images in the tradition. Beside the developed legend of the mandylion or Image of Edessa was the tale of the Veil of Veronica, whose very name signifies "true icon" or "true image", the fear of a "false image" remaining strong.

== Stylistic developments ==
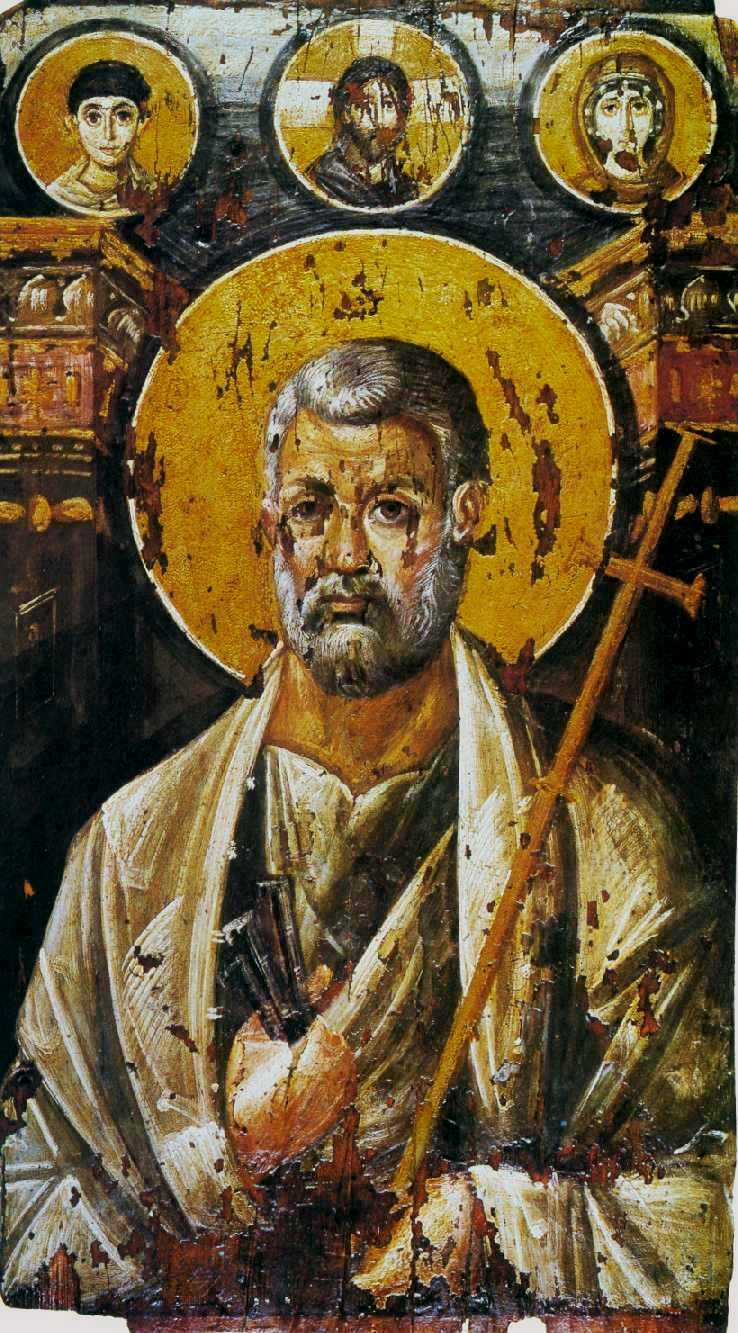
St Peter encaustic on panel, c. 6th century (Saint Catherine's Monastery)

Although there are earlier records of their use, no panel icons earlier than the few from the 6th century preserved at the Greek Orthodox Saint Catherine's Monastery in Egypt survive, as the other examples in Rome have all been drastically over-painted. The surviving evidence for the earliest depictions of Christ, Mary and saints therefore comes from wall-paintings, mosaics and some carvings. They are realistic in appearance, in contrast to the later stylization. They are broadly similar in style, though often much superior in quality, to the mummy portraits done in wax (encaustic) and found at Fayyum in Egypt.

As can be judged from such items, the first depictions of Jesus were generic, rather than portrait images, generally representing him as a beardless young man. It was some time before the earliest examples of the long-haired, bearded face that was later to become standardized as the image of Jesus appeared. When they did begin to appear there was still variation. Augustine of Hippo (354–430) said that no one knew the appearance of Jesus or that of Mary. However, Augustine was not a resident of the Holy Land and therefore was not familiar with the local populations and their oral traditions. Gradually, paintings of Jesus took on characteristics of portrait images.

At this time the manner of depicting Jesus was not yet uniform, and there was some controversy over which of the two most common icons was to be favored. The first or "Semitic" form showed Jesus with short and "frizzy" hair; the second showed a bearded Jesus with hair parted in the middle, the manner in which the god Zeus was depicted. Theodorus Lector remarked that of the two, the one with short and frizzy hair was "more authentic". To support his assertion, he relates a story (excerpted by John of Damascus) that a pagan commissioned to paint an image of Jesus used the "Zeus" form instead of the "Semitic" form, and that as punishment his hands withered.

Though their development was gradual, it is possible to date the full-blown appearance and general ecclesiastical (as opposed to simply popular or local) acceptance of Christian images as venerated and miracle-working objects to the 6th century, when, as Hans Belting writes, "we first hear of the church's use of religious images". "As we reach the second half of the sixth century, we find that images are attracting direct veneration and some of them are credited with the performance of miracles". Cyril Mango writes, "In the post-Justinianic period the icon assumes an ever increasing role in popular devotion, and there is a proliferation of miracle stories connected with icons, some of them rather shocking to our eyes". However, the earlier references by Eusebius and Irenaeus indicate veneration of images and reported miracles associated with them as early as the 2nd century.

== Symbolism ==
In the icons of Eastern Orthodoxy, and of the early Medieval West, very little room is made for artistic license. Almost everything within the image has a symbolic aspect. Christ, the saints, and the angels all have halos. Angels (and often John the Baptist) have wings because they are messengers. Figures have consistent facial appearances, hold attributes personal to them, and use a few conventional poses. Archangels bear a thin staff and sometimes a mirror.

Colour plays an important role as well. Gold represents the radiance of Heaven; red, divine life. Blue is the colour of human life, white is the Uncreated Light of God, only used for resurrection and transfiguration of Christ. In icons of Jesus and Mary, Jesus wears red undergarment with a blue outer garment (representing God becoming human) and Mary wears a blue undergarment with a red overgarment (representing a human who was granted gifts by God), and thus the doctrine of deification is conveyed by icons. Letters are symbols too. Most icons incorporate some calligraphic text naming the person or event depicted. Even this is often presented in a stylized manner.

== Palladium and miracles ==
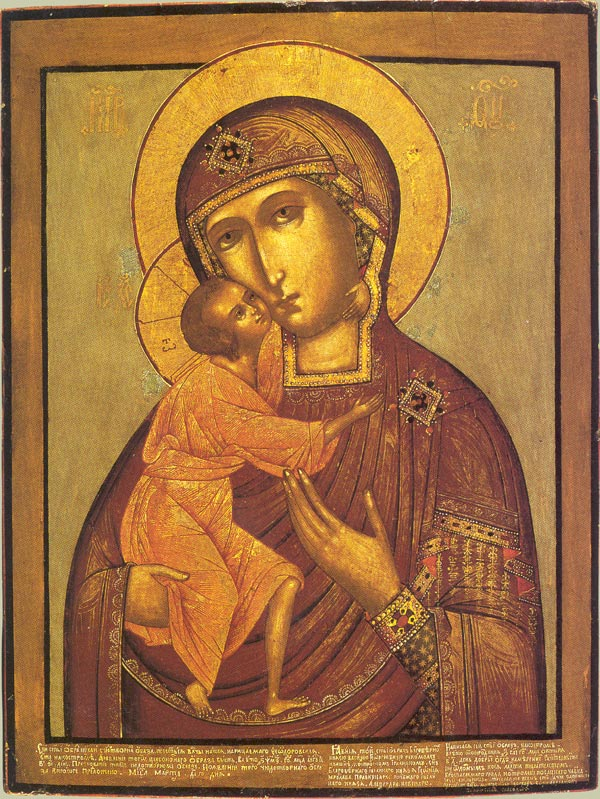
Our Lady of St. Theodore, a 1703 copy of the 11th-century icon, following the same Byzantine "Tender Mercy" type as the Vladimirskaya above

The historical tradition of icons used for purposes other than visual depiction are the Palladium (protective image), the Palladium (classical antiquity), the acheiropoieta, and various "folk" traditions associated with folk religion. Of these various forms the oldest tradition dates back to before the Christian era among the ancient Greeks. The various "folk" traditions are more poorly documented and often are associated with local folk narratives of uncertain origin.

In English, since around 1600, the word palladium has been used figuratively to mean anything believed to provide protection or safety, and in particular in Christian contexts a sacred relic or icon believed to have a protective role in military contexts for a whole city, people or nation. Such beliefs first become prominent in the Eastern Churches in the period after the reign of the Byzantine Emperor Justinian I, and later spread to the Western church. Palladia were processed around the walls of besieged cities and sometimes carried into battle.

== Eastern Orthodox teaching ==
The Eastern Orthodox view of the origin of icons is generally quite different from that of most secular scholars and from some in contemporary Roman Catholic circles: "The Orthodox Church maintains and teaches that the sacred image has existed from the beginning of Christianity", Léonid Ouspensky has written. Accounts that some non-Orthodox writers consider legendary are accepted as history within Eastern Orthodoxy, because they are a part of church tradition. Thus accounts such as that of the miraculous "image not made by hands", and the weeping and moving "Mother of God of the Sign" of Novgorod are accepted as fact: "Church Tradition tells us, for example, of the existence of an Icon of the Savior during His lifetime (the 'Icon-Made-Without-Hands') and of Icons of the Most-Holy Theotokos [Mary] immediately after Him."

Eastern Orthodoxy further teaches that "a clear understanding of the importance of Icons" was part of the church from its very beginning, and has never changed, although explanations of their importance may have developed over time. This is because icon painting is rooted in the theology of the Incarnation (Christ being the eikon of God) which did not change, though its subsequent clarification within the Church occurred over the period of the first seven Ecumenical Councils. Icons also served as tools of edification for the illiterate faithful during most of the history of Christendom. Thus, icons are words in painting; they refer to the history of salvation and to its manifestation in concrete persons. In the Orthodox Church, "icons have always been understood as a visible gospel, as a testimony to the great things given man by God the incarnate Logos". In the Council of 860 it was stated that "all that is uttered in words written in syllables is also proclaimed in the language of colors".

Eastern Orthodoxy identifies the first instance of an image or icon in the Bible as the creation of man in God's own image (Septuagint Greek eikona), in Genesis 1:26–27. In Exodus, God initially commanded the Israelites not to make any graven images. However, shortly thereafter, God instructed them to create images of cherubim and other similar beings, both in the form of statues and woven into tapestries. Later, when Solomon built the First Temple, he incorporated even more such imagery. Eastern Orthodoxy believe these qualify as icons, in that they were visible images depicting heavenly beings and, in the case of the cherubim, used to indirectly indicate God's presence above the Ark.

In the Book of Numbers it is written that God told Moses to make a bronze serpent, Nehushtan, and hold it up, so that anyone looking at the snake would be healed of their snake bites. In John 3, Jesus refers to the same serpent, saying that he must be lifted up in the same way that the serpent was. John of Damascus also regarded the brazen serpent as an icon. Further, Jesus Christ himself is called the "image of the invisible God" in Colossians 1:15, and is therefore in one sense an icon. As people are also made in God's images, people are also considered to be living icons, and are therefore "censed" along with painted icons during Orthodox prayer services.

According to John of Damascus, anyone who tries to destroy icons "is the enemy of Christ, the Holy Mother of God and the saints, and is the defender of the Devil and his demons". This is because the theology behind icons is closely tied to the Incarnational theology of the humanity and divinity of Jesus, so that attacks on icons typically have the effect of undermining or attacking the Incarnation of Jesus himself as elucidated in the Ecumenical Councils.

Basil of Caesarea, in his writing On the Holy Spirit, says: "The honor paid to the image passes to the prototype". He also illustrates the concept by saying, "If I point to a statue of Caesar and ask you 'Who is that?', your answer would properly be, 'It is Caesar.' When you say such you do not mean that the stone itself is Caesar, but rather, the name and honor you ascribe to the statue passes over to the original, the archetype, Caesar himself."

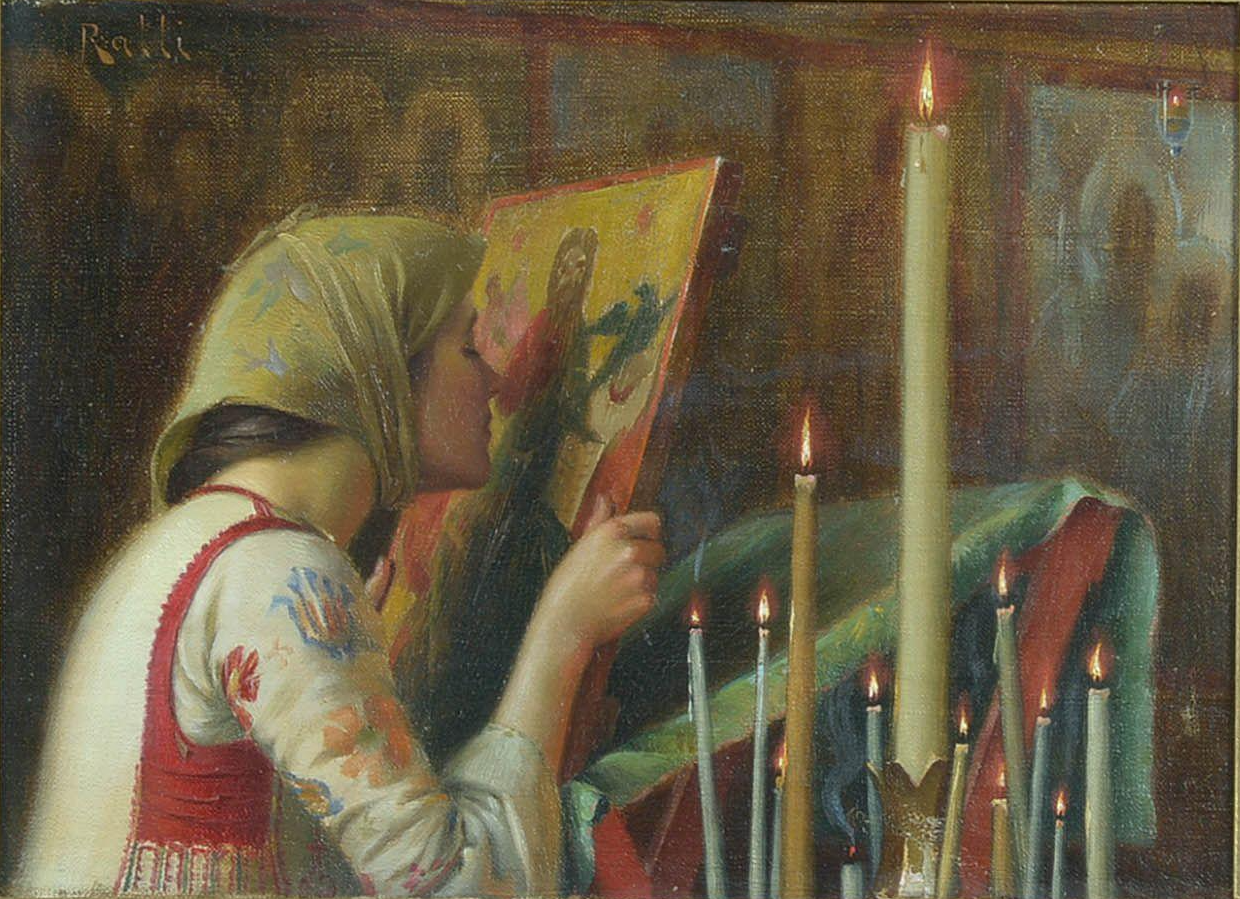
Young Girl in a Chapel by Théodore Jacques Ralli, 1873-1895, kissing an icon following Greek tradition.

This is thus the approach to icons; to kiss an icon of Jesus, in the Eastern Orthodox view, is to show love towards Jesus himself, not mere wood and paint making up the physical substance of the icon. Worship of the icon as somehow entirely separate from its prototype is expressly forbidden by the Seventh Ecumenical Council.

Icons are often illuminated with a candle or jar of oil with a wick. (Beeswax for candles and olive oil for oil lamps are preferred because they burn very cleanly, although other materials are sometimes used.) The illumination of religious images with lamps or candles is an ancient practice pre-dating Christianity.

According to Fr. Les Bundy, "The Ecumenical Counciliar dogmatic decrees on icons refer, in fact, to all religious images including three-dimensional statues. Professor Sergios Verkhovskoi, the conservative professor of dogmatics at St. Vladimir’s Seminary forthrightly condemns as heretical anyone who declares statues as unorthodox or in any way canonically inferior to paintings." Historically, the Orthodox Church has always approved of veneration of statues, for example, the statue of the Mother of God at Sokolica Monastery in Serbia, the devotional statues of St. Nil Stolbensky, and those of St. Paraskeva.

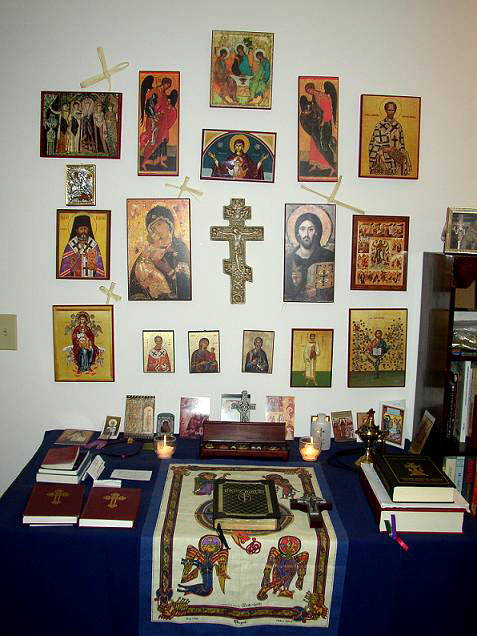
A fairly elaborate Eastern Orthodox icon corner as would be found in a private home

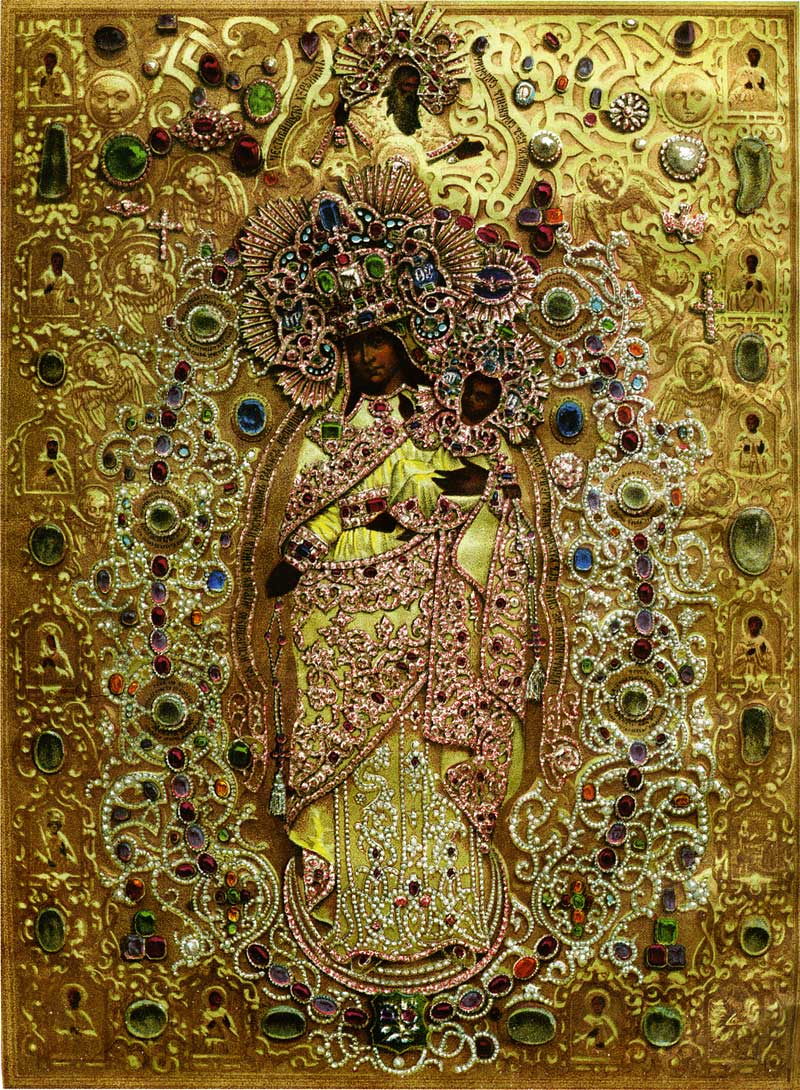
A precious Russian icon of Joy of All Who Sorrow, 1862

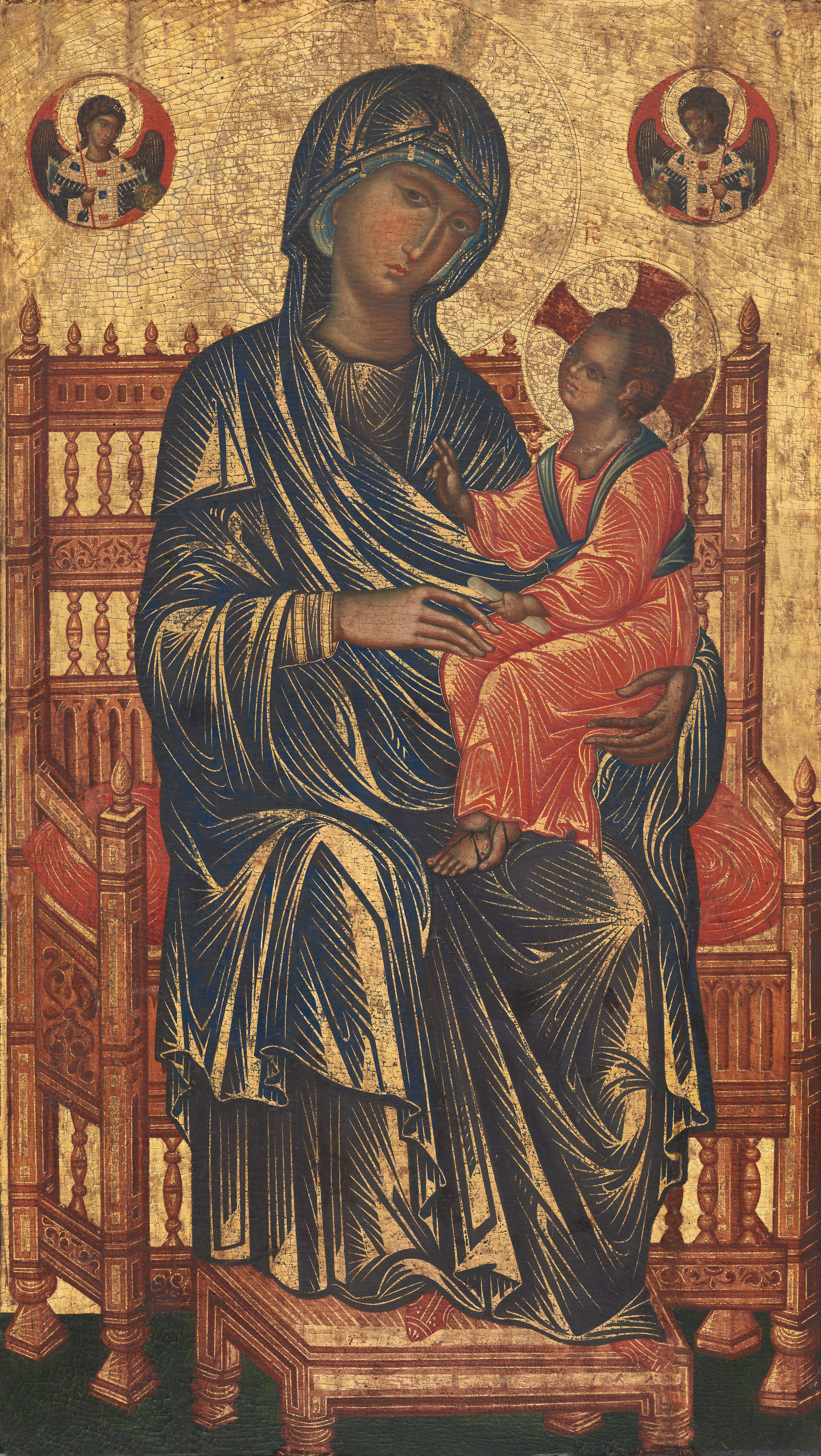
A somewhat disinterested treatment of the emotional subject and painstaking attention to the throne and other details of the material world distinguish this Italo-Byzantine work by a medieval Sicilian master from works by imperial icon-painters of Constantinople.

== Icon painting tradition by region ==
=== Byzantine Empire ===
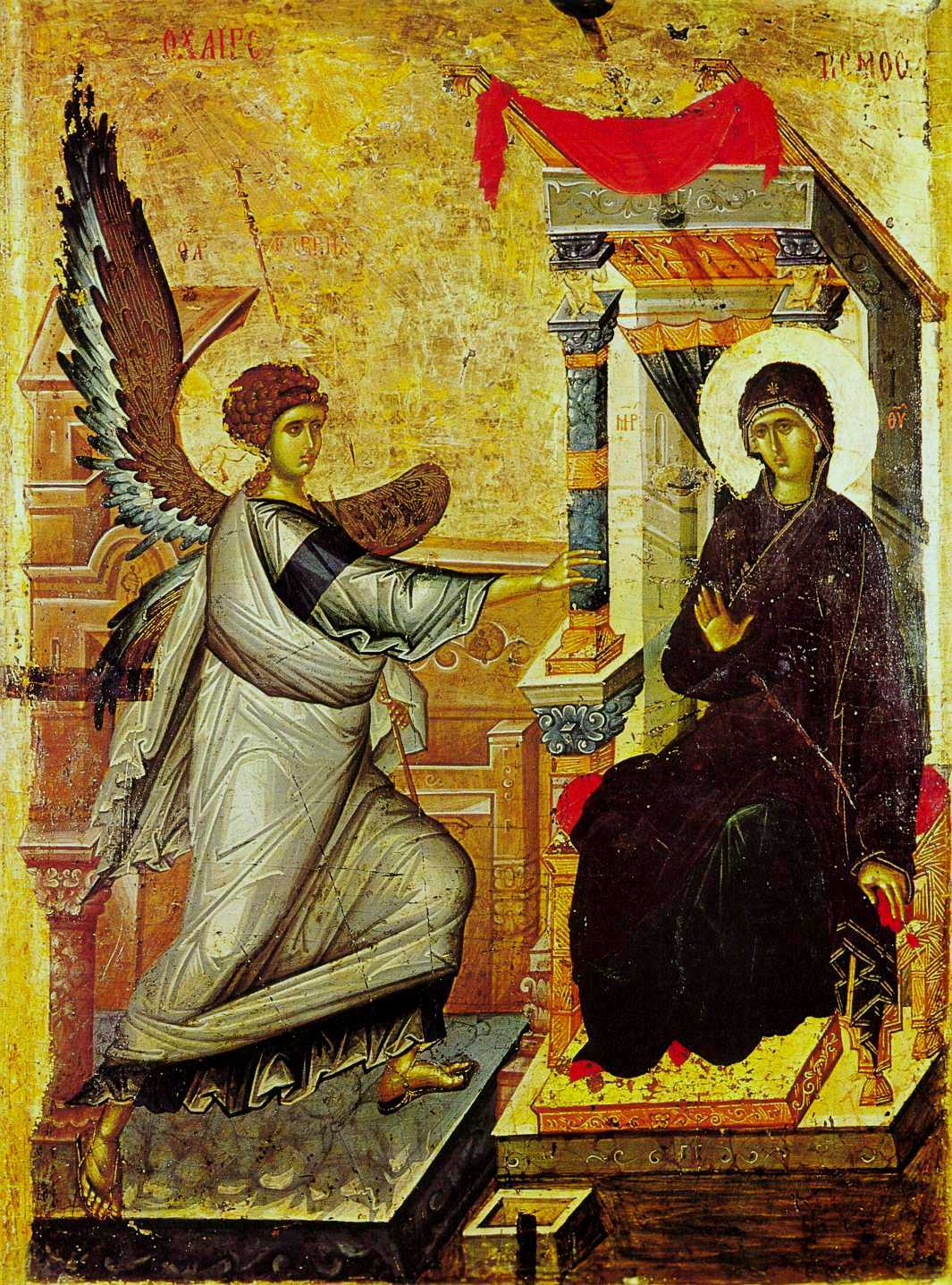
A key piece of Palaiologan-era mannerism—the Annunciation icon from Ohrid in North Macedonia

Of the icon painting tradition that developed in Byzantium, with Constantinople as the chief city, we have only a few icons from the 11th century and none preceding them, in part because of the Iconoclastic reforms during which many were destroyed or lost, and also because of plundering by the Republic of Venice in 1204 during the Fourth Crusade, and finally the Fall of Constantinople in 1453.

It was only in the Komnenian period (1081–1185) that the cult of the icon became widespread in the Byzantine world, partly on account of the dearth of richer materials (such as mosaics, ivory, and vitreous enamels), but also because an iconostasis a special screen for icons was introduced then in ecclesiastical practice. The style of the time was severe, hieratic and distant.

In the late Comnenian period this severity softened, and emotion, formerly avoided, entered icon painting. Major monuments for this change include the murals at Daphni Monastery (c. 1100) and the Church of St. Panteleimon near Skopje (1164). The Theotokos of Vladimir (c. 1115) is probably the most representative example of the new trend towards spirituality and emotion.

The tendency toward emotionalism in icons continued in the Paleologan period, which began in 1261. Palaiologan art reached its pinnacle in mosaics such as those of Chora Church. In the last half of the 14th century, Palaiologan saints were painted in an exaggerated manner, very slim and in contorted positions – a style known as the Palaiologan Mannerism, of which Ochrid's Annunciation is a superb example.

After 1453, the Byzantine tradition was carried on in regions previously influenced by its religion and culture—in the Balkans, Russia, and other Slavic countries, Georgia and Armenia in the Caucasus, and among Eastern Orthodox minorities in the Islamic world. In the Greek-speaking world Crete, ruled by Venice until the mid-17th century, was an important centre of painted icons, as home of the Cretan School, exporting many to Europe.

=== Crete ===
Crete was under Venetian control from 1204 and became a thriving center of art with eventually a Scuola di San Luca, or organized painter's guild, the Guild of Saint Luke, on Western lines. Cretan painting was heavily patronized both by Catholics of Venetian territories and by Eastern Orthodox. For ease of transport, Cretan painters specialized in panel paintings, and developed the ability to work in many styles to fit the taste of various patrons. El Greco, who moved to Venice after establishing his reputation in Crete, is the most famous artist of the school, who continued to use many Byzantine conventions in his works. In 1669 the city of Heraklion, on Crete, which at one time boasted at least 120 painters, fell to the Turks. From that time Greek icon painting went into a decline, with a revival attempted in the 20th century by art reformers such as Photis Kontoglou, who emphasized a return to earlier styles.

=== Russia ===
Russian icons are typically paintings on wood, often small, though some in churches and monasteries may be as large as a table top. Many religious homes in Russia have icons hanging on the wall in the krasny ugol—the "red" corner (see Icon corner). There is a rich history and elaborate religious symbolism associated with icons. In Russian churches, the nave is typically separated from the sanctuary by an iconostasis, a wall of icons.

The use and making of icons entered Kievan Rus' following its conversion to Orthodox Christianity from the Eastern Roman (Byzantine) Empire in 988 AD. As a general rule, these icons strictly followed models and formulas hallowed by usage, some of which had originated in Constantinople. As time passed, the Russians—notably Andrei Rublev and Dionisius—widened the vocabulary of iconic types and styles far beyond anything found elsewhere. The personal, improvisatory and creative traditions of Western European religious art are largely lacking in Russia before the 17th century, when Simon Ushakov's painting became strongly influenced by religious paintings and engravings from Protestant as well as Catholic Europe.

In the mid-17th century, changes in liturgy and practice instituted by Patriarch Nikon of Moscow resulted in a split in the Russian Orthodox Church. The traditionalists, the persecuted "Old Ritualists" or "Old Believers", continued the traditional stylization of icons, while the State Church modified its practice. From that time icons began to be painted not only in the traditional stylized and nonrealistic mode, but also in a mixture of Russian stylization and Western European realism, and in a Western European manner very much like that of Catholic religious art of the time. The Stroganov school and the icons from Nevyansk rank among the last important schools of Russian icon-painting.

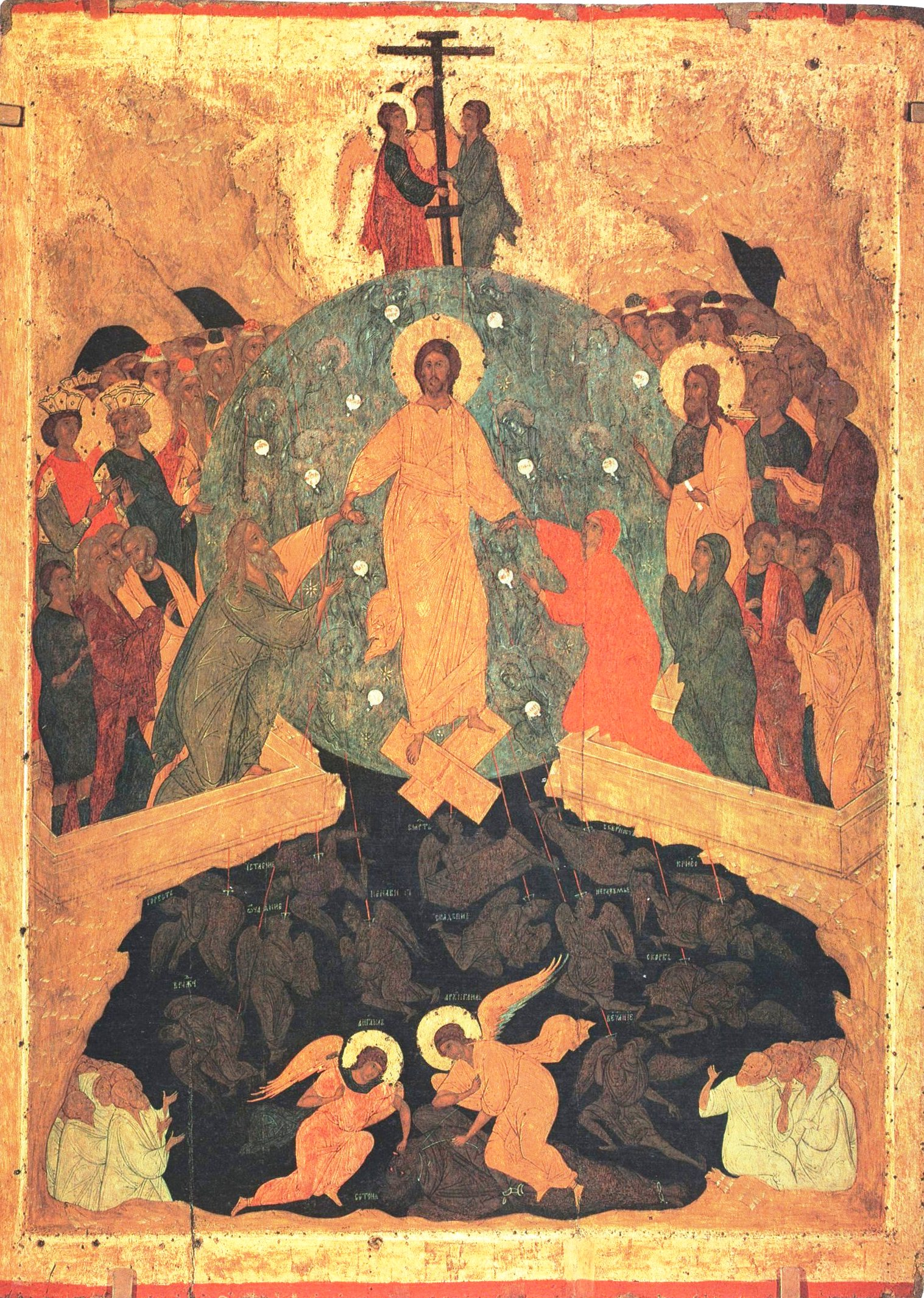
Muscovite Mannerism: Harrowing of Hell, by Dionisius and his workshop.

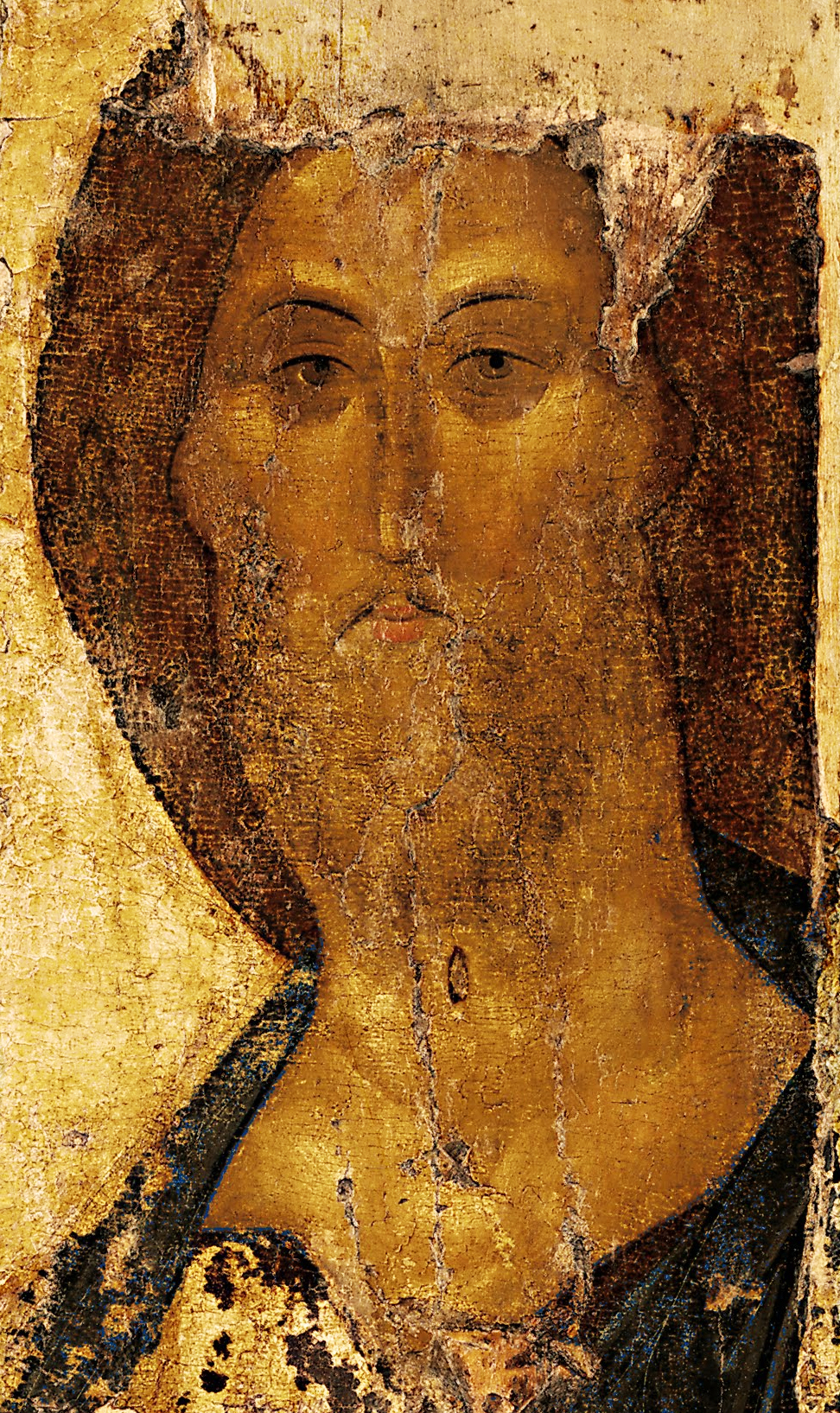
Christ the Redeemer (1410s, by Andrei Rublev)

=== Romania ===
In Romania, icons painted as reversed images behind glass and set in frames were common in the 19th century and are still made. The process is known as reverse glass painting. "In the Transylvanian countryside, the expensive icons on panels imported from Moldavia, Wallachia, and Mt. Athos were gradually replaced by small, locally produced icons on glass, which were much less expensive and thus accessible to the Transylvanian peasants".

=== Serbia ===
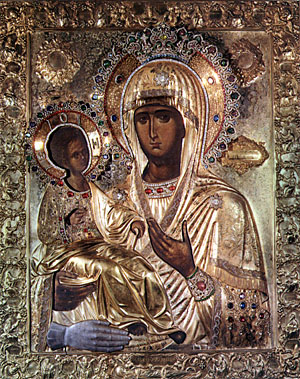
Trojeručica meaning "Three-handed Theotokos", the most important Serb icon

The earliest historical records about icons in Serbia dates back to the period of Nemanjić dynasty. One of the notable schools of Serb icons was active in the Bay of Kotor from the 17th century to the 19th century.

Trojeručica meaning "Three-handed Theotokos" is the most important icon of the Serbian Orthodox Church and main icon of Mount Athos.

=== Ukraine ===
During the period of Kievan Rus, an indigenous school of icon painting developed in the lands of Ukraine, inspired by Byzantine examples. With the rise of Galicia-Volhynia, a local school also developed in the area, influenced in its turn by Kyivan icons. Influence of Galician icon painting spread across the Carpathians, reaching as far as Prešov in modern Slovakia. Some icons were painted by monks, but most were created by professional artists. In the 16th century, Lviv became the main centre of painting in Ukrainian lands, and by the middle of the next century Orthodox artists achieved prominent positions in the city's painters' guild. Among notable icon painters of the area during that time was Ivan Rutkovych, whose art demonstrated a strong tendency to realism.

Starting from the early 17th century, icon painting saw a revival in Central and Eastern Ukraine, supported both by the church and by the rising Cossack elite. The strict Byzantine style prevalent in icons of the previous era gave way to the more expressive style of Ukrainian Baroque. Some icons created in the Cossack Hetmanate depict not only religious figures, but also civic rulers such as hetmans, as well as members of their families. By the end of the 18th century icon gradually evolved into painting on biblical motives, as demonstrated in the works of Volodymyr Borovykovsky. A new revival of this art form in Ukraine took place in the early 20th century under the influence of the school of Mykhailo Boychuk, whose style influenced other painters, many of whom were active in the Ukrainian diaspora.

=== Egypt and Ethiopia ===
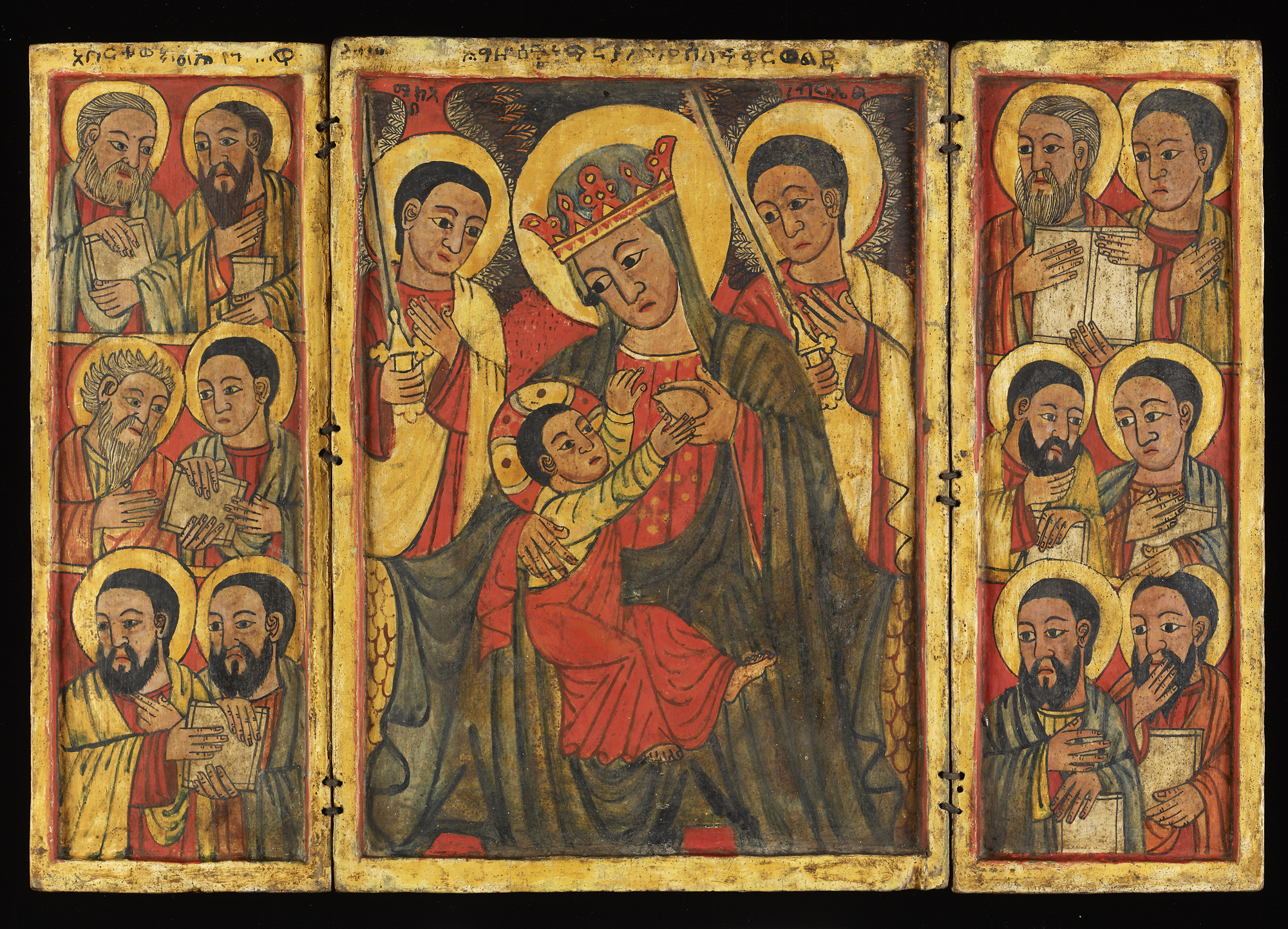
Ethiopian Orthodox painting of the Virgin Mary nursing the infant Christ

The Coptic Orthodox Church of Alexandria and Oriental Orthodoxy also have distinctive, living icon painting traditions. Coptic icons have their origin in the Hellenistic art of Egyptian Late Antiquity, as exemplified by the Fayum mummy portraits. Beginning in the 4th century, churches painted their walls and made icons to reflect an authentic expression of their faith.

=== Aleppo ===
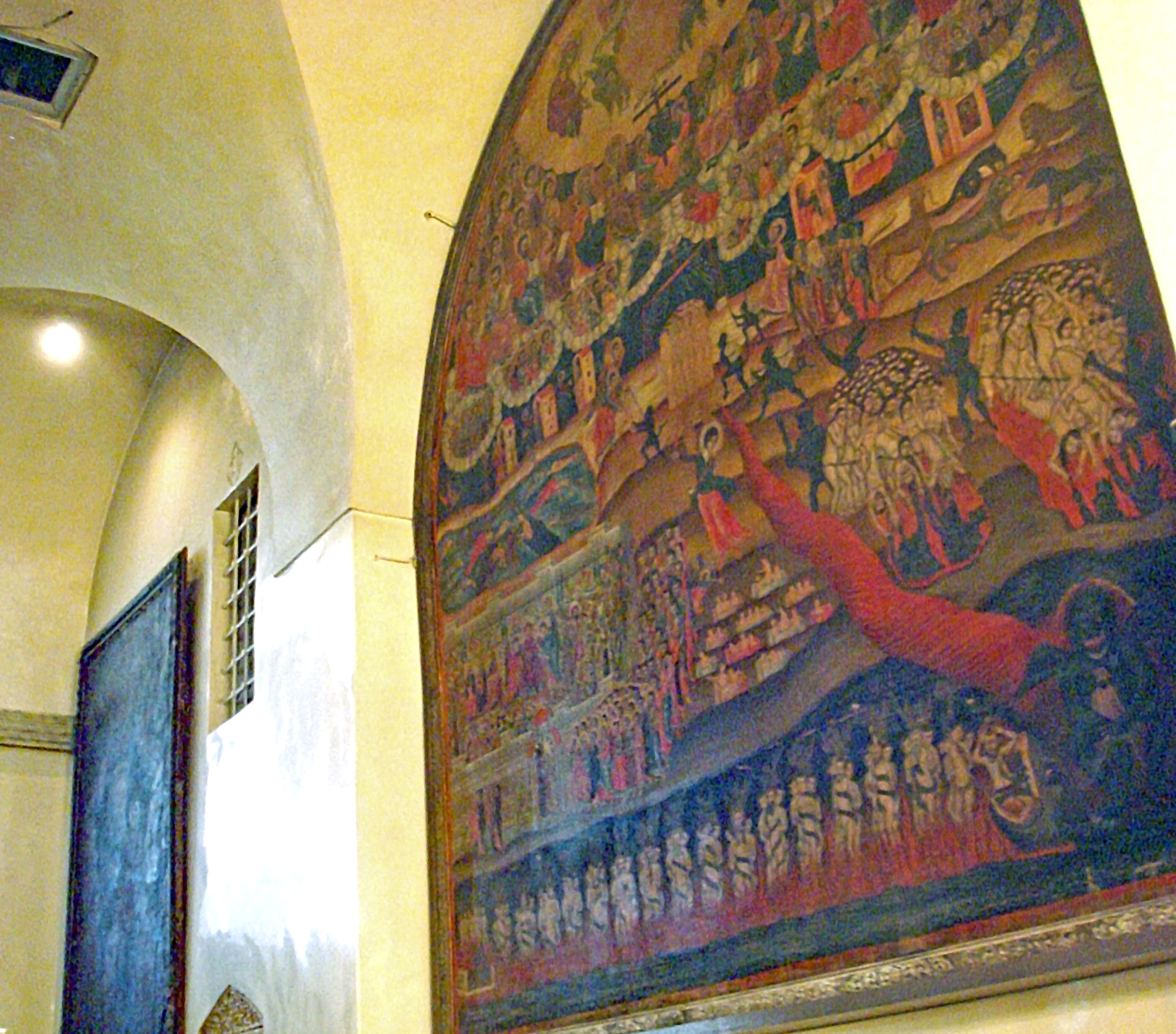
The Last Judgement by Nehmatallah Hovsep (1703), one of the most famous icons of the Aleppo School

The Aleppo School was a school of icon-painting, founded by the priest Yusuf al-Musawwir (also known as Joseph the Painter) and active in Aleppo, which was then a part of the Ottoman Empire, between at least 1645 and 1777.

=== Svaneti ===
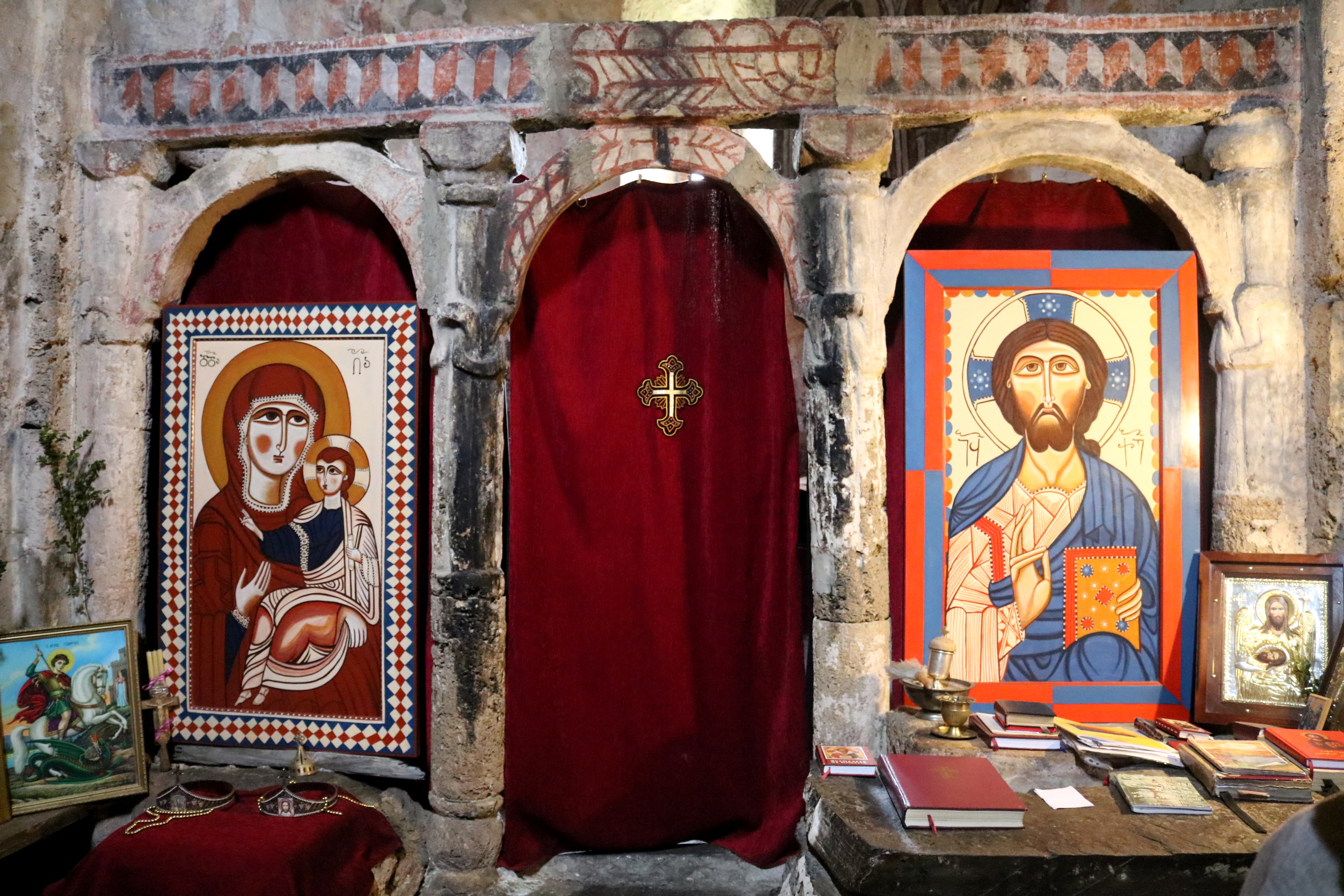
Icons depicting The Virgin Mary and Jesus Christ in the Svaneti style, located in the Lamaria Church of Ushguli, Svaneti

The Svaneti school of iconography emerged in the 13th century within monasteries of Svaneti, Georgia. The icon style was localised to this region and characterised by simplified forms and exaggerated, rounded features, differing from the Byzantine style also popular in Medieval Georgia.

== Western Christianity ==
Although the word "icon" is not generally used in Western Christianity, there are religious works of art which were largely patterned on Byzantine works, and equally conventional in composition and depiction. Until the 13th century, icon-like depictions of sacred figures followed Eastern patterns—although very few survive from this early period. Italian examples are in a style known as Italo-Byzantine.

From the 13th century, the Western tradition came slowly to allow the artist far more flexibility, and a more realist approach to the figures. If only because there was a much smaller number of skilled artists, the quantity of works of art, in the sense of panel paintings, was much smaller in the West, and in most Western settings a single diptych as an altarpiece, or in a domestic room, probably stood in place of the larger collections typical of Orthodox "icon corners".

Only in the 15th century did production of painted works of art begin to approach Eastern levels, supplemented by mass-produced imports from the Cretan School. In this century, the use of icon-like portraits in the West was enormously increased by the introduction of old master prints on paper, mostly woodcuts which were produced in vast numbers (although hardly any survive). They were mostly sold, hand-coloured, by churches, and the smallest sizes (often only an inch high) were affordable even by peasants, who glued or pinned them straight onto a wall.

During the time of the Reformation, the emergence of the Lutheran and the Reformed traditions occurred. Lutherans favored sacred art, including the use of icons (cf. Lutheran art). On the other hand, the Reformed (Calvinists) were generally iconoclastic. At present, icons "play a role in Lutheran liturgical practice." The Lutheran breviary For All the Saints is illustrated with several icons.

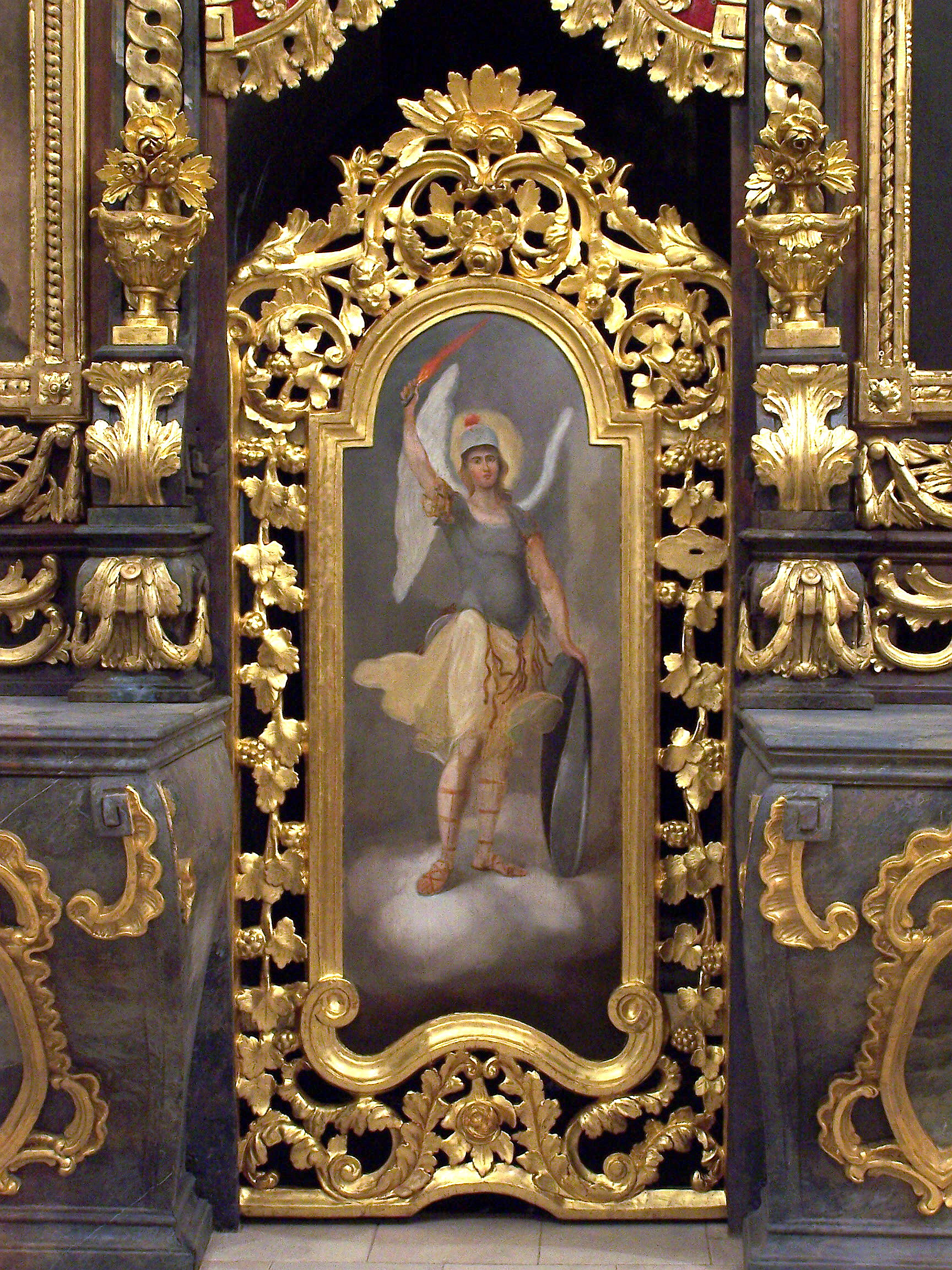
A Western-style icon of the archangel Michael in the Greek Catholic Iconostasis of the Cathedral of Hajdúdorog

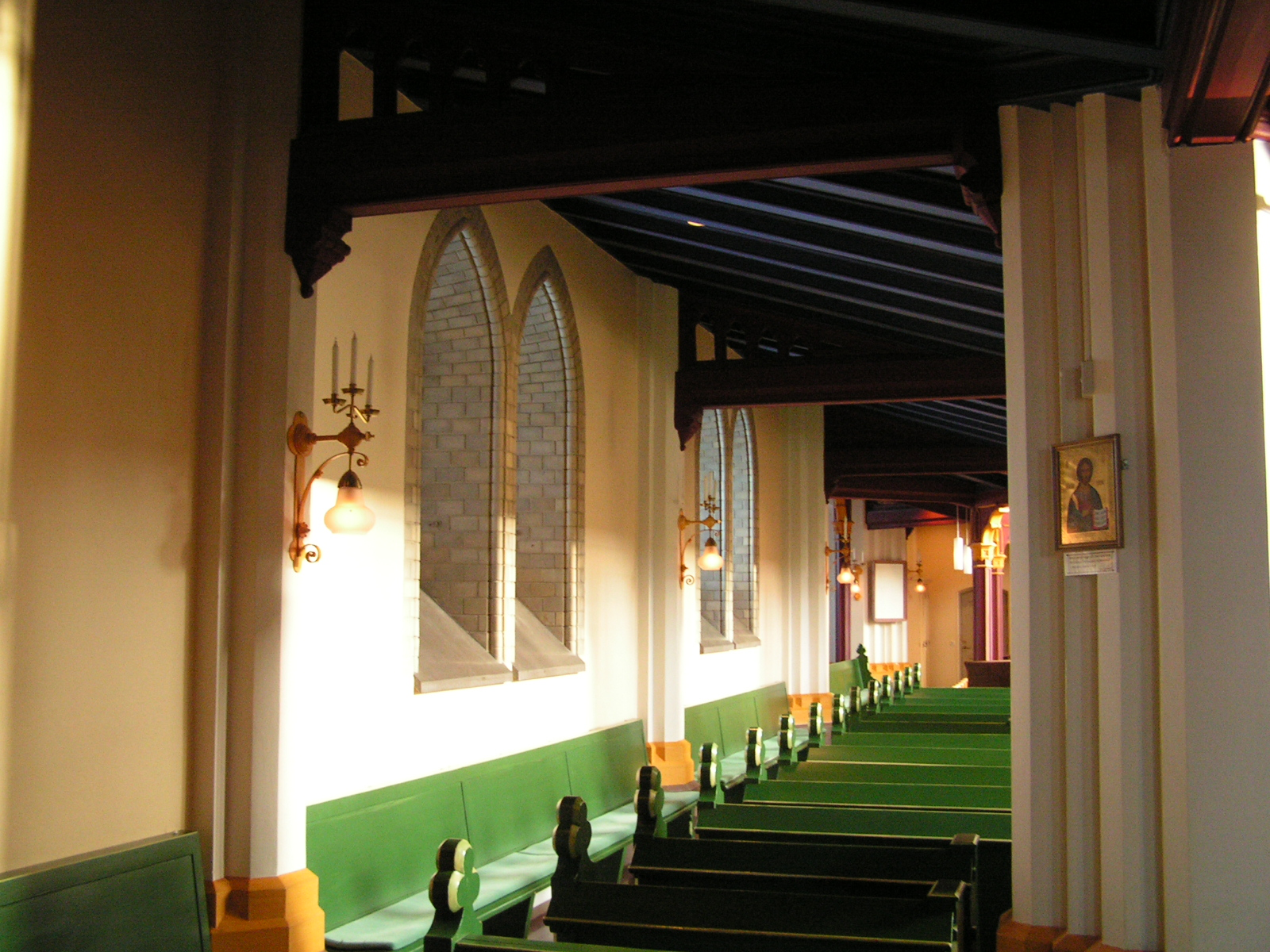
An icon of Christ at Umeå City Lutheran Church, Sweden

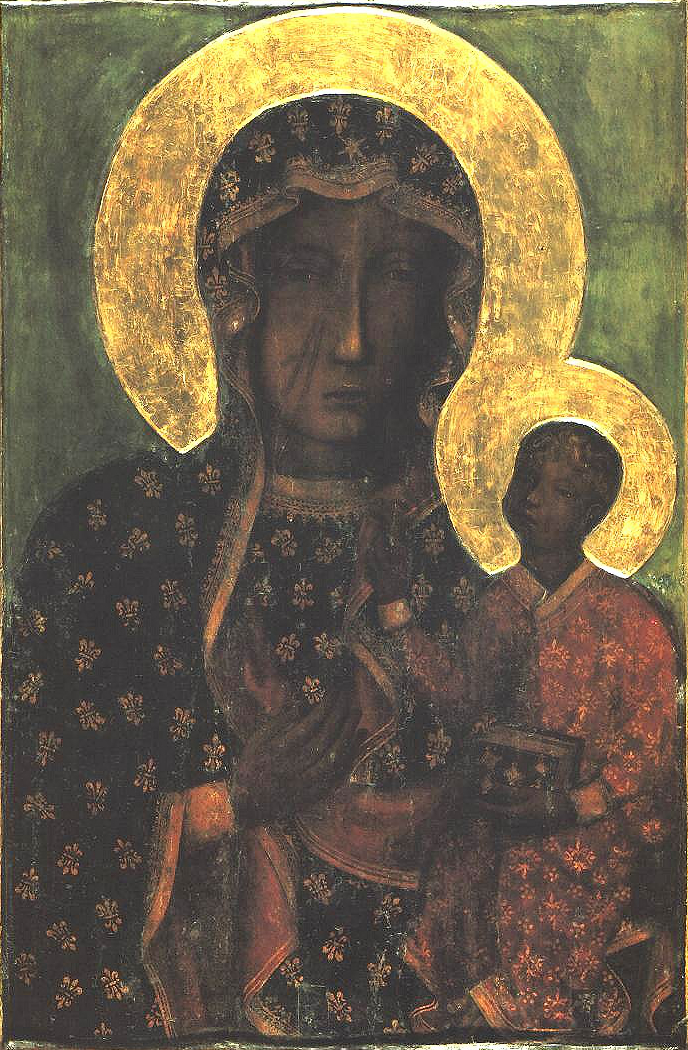
An icon of the Black Madonna of Częstochowa, one of the national symbols of Poland

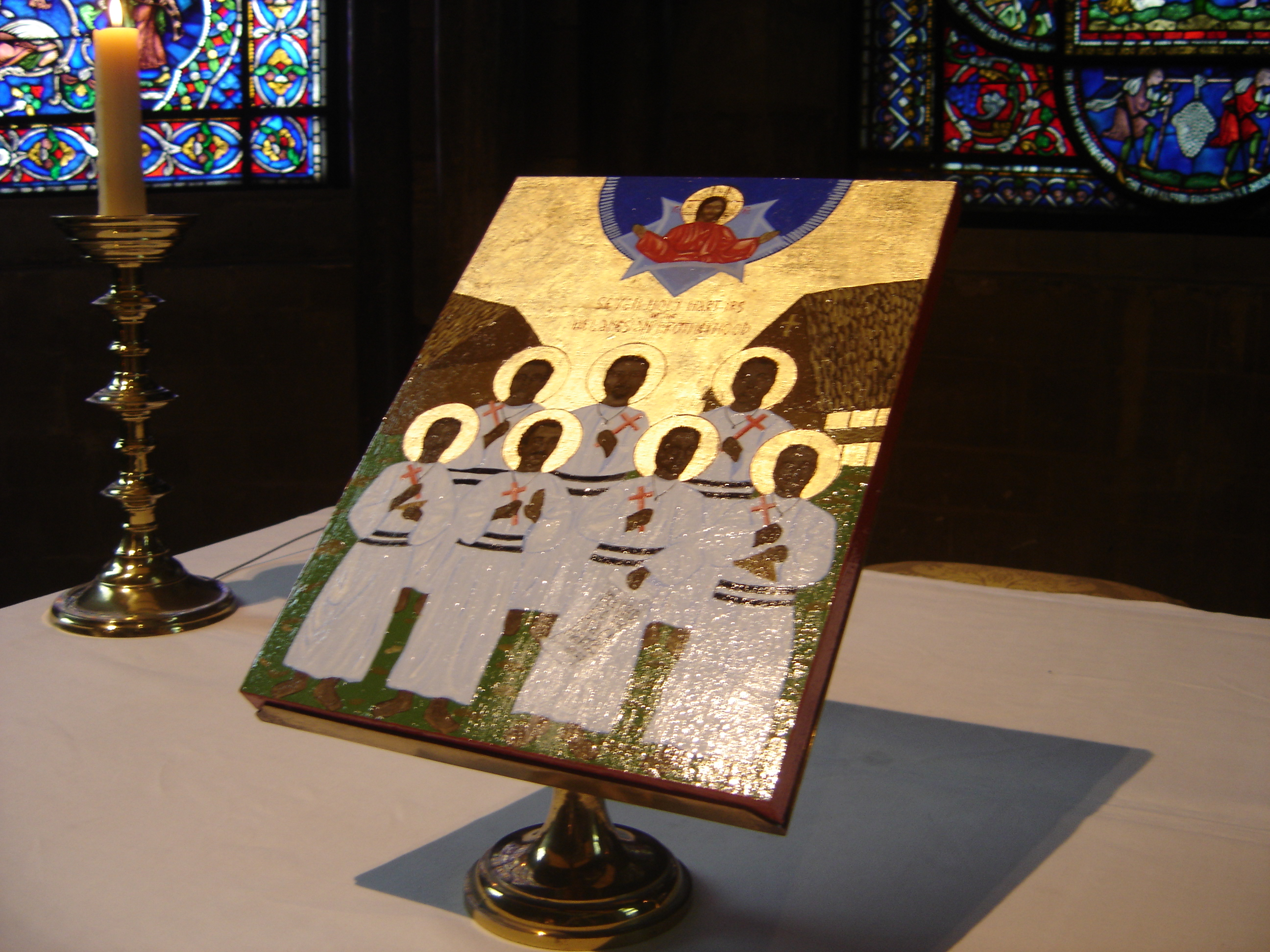
Icon of the Melanesian Brotherhood martyrs at Canterbury Cathedral (Anglican Communion)

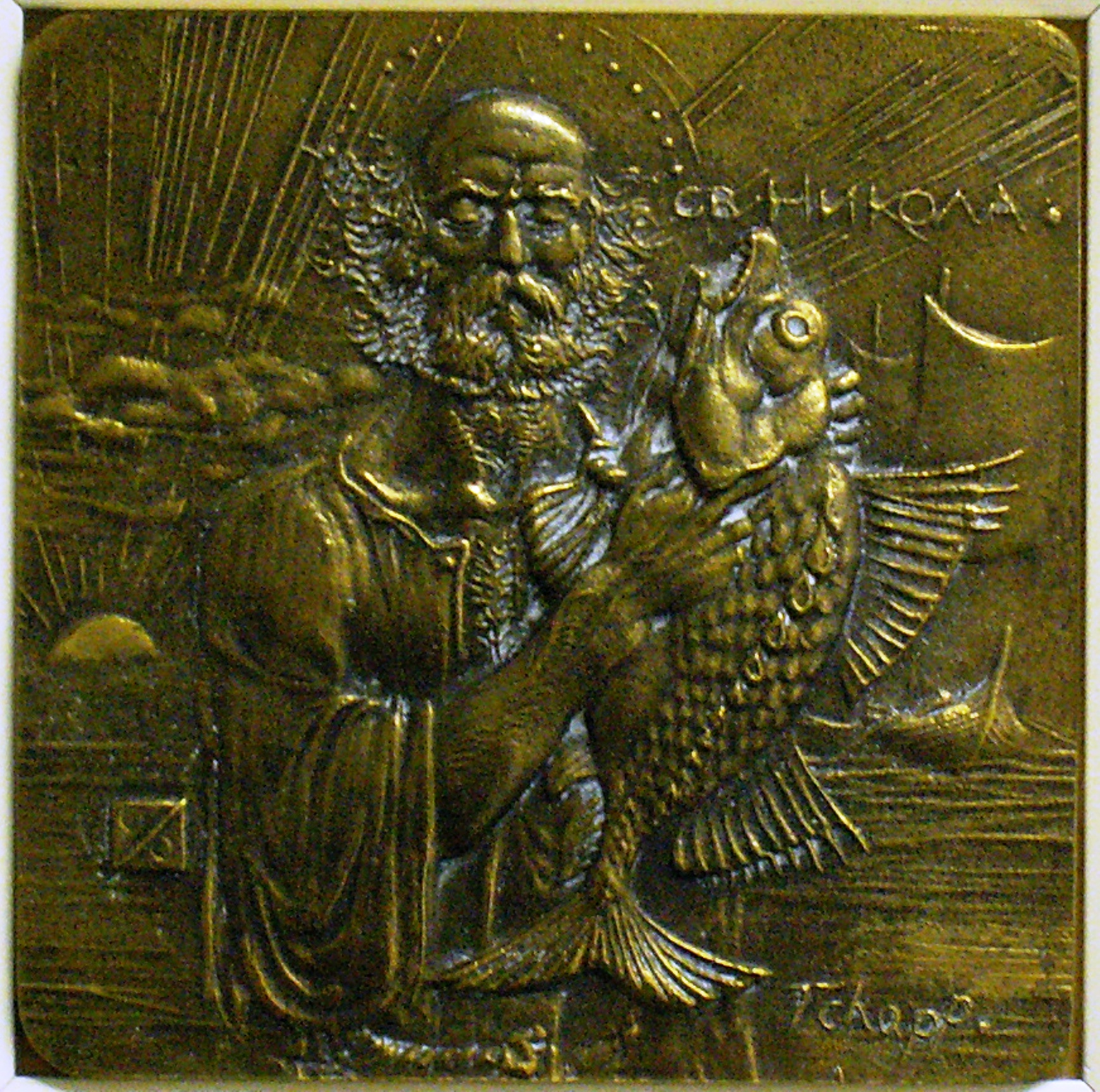
A modern metal icon of Saint Nicholas by the Bulgarian artist Georgi 'Chapa' Chapkanov. This depiction differs radically from traditional Orthodox iconography. Gilbert House, Stanley, Falkland Islands.

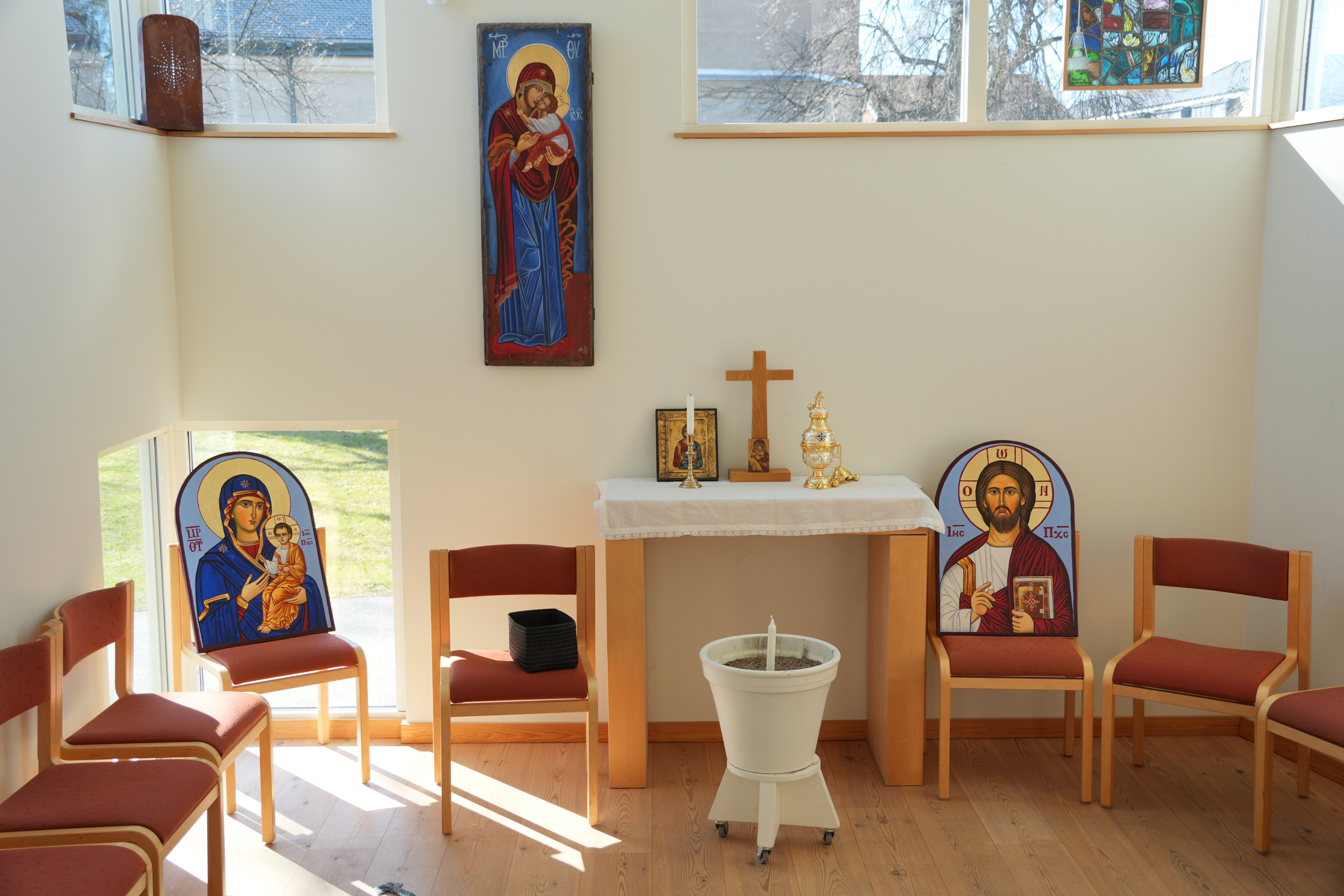
Icons surround the altar of the Lady Chapel of Norrtälje Evangelical-Lutheran Church in Sweden

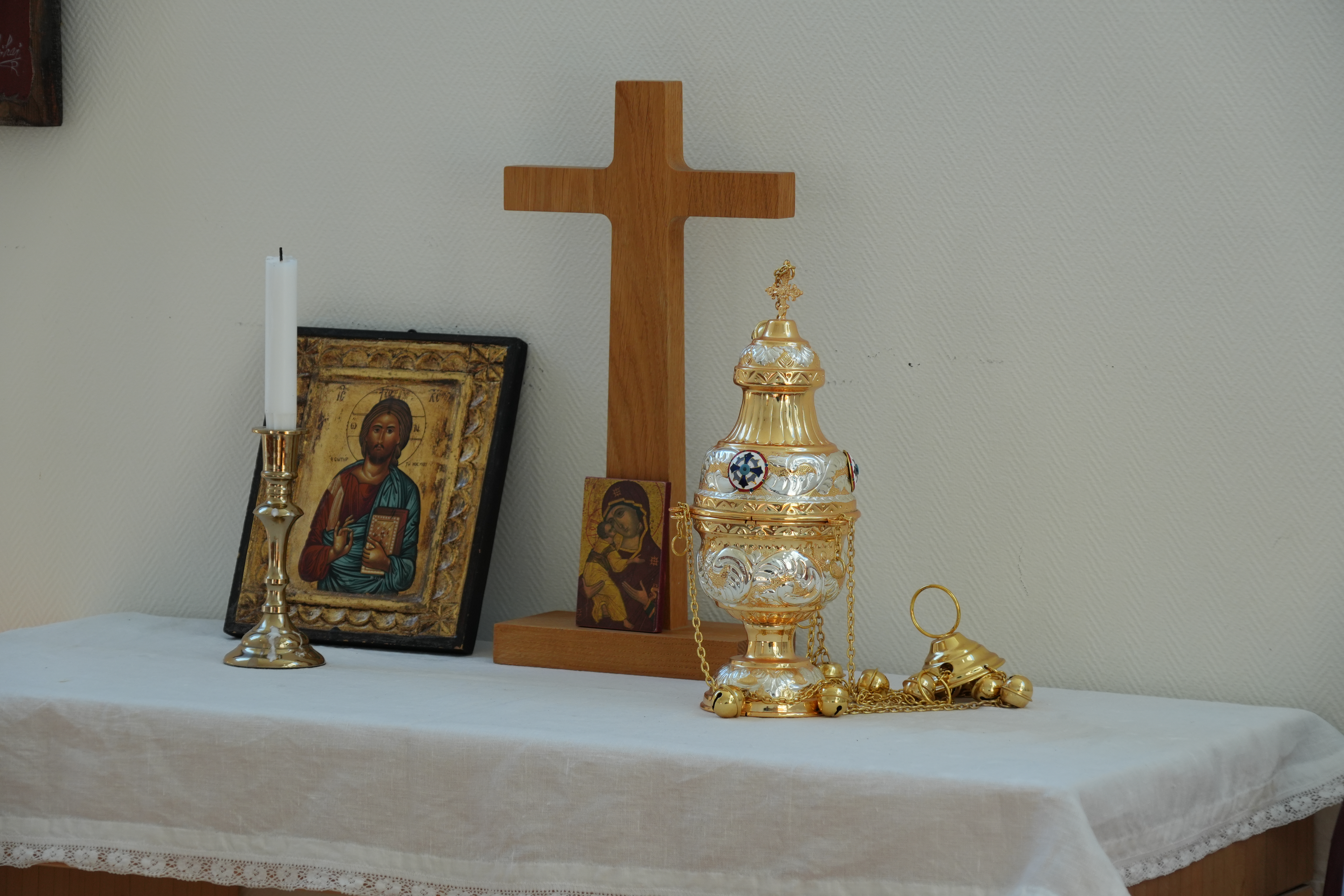
Icons at the base of the altar cross of the Marian Chapel of Norrtälje Evangelical-Lutheran Church, part of the Archdiocese of Uppsala

An icon in a reconciliation room at Uppsala Cathedral (Evangelical-Lutheran) in Sweden

=== Roman Catholic view ===
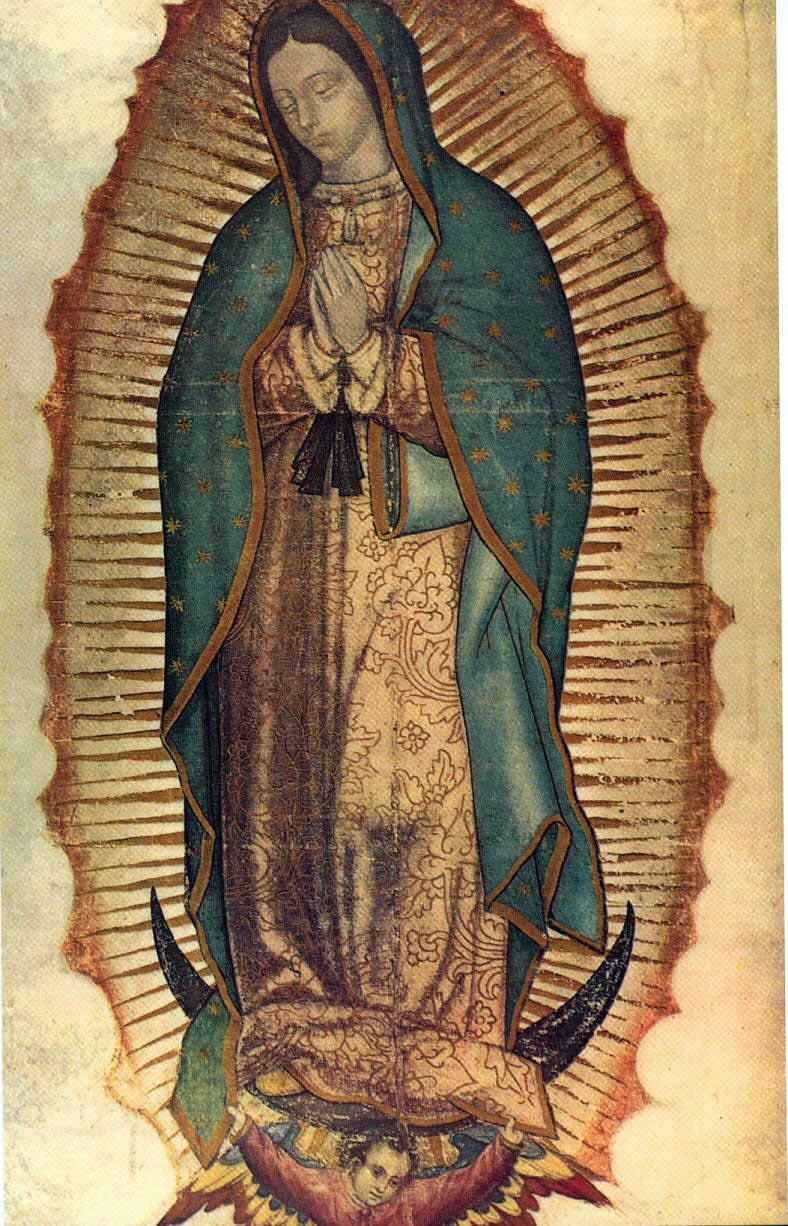
Our Lady of Guadalupe, an icon synonymous with Catholicism in Mexico.

The Catholic Church accepted the decrees of the iconodule Seventh Ecumenical Council regarding images. There is some minor difference, however, in the Catholic attitude to images from that of the Orthodox. Following Gregory the Great, Catholics emphasize the role of images as the Biblia Pauperum, the "Bible of the Poor", from which those who could not read could nonetheless learn.

Catholics also, however, share the same viewpoint with the Orthodox when it comes to image veneration, believing that whenever approached, sacred images are to be shown reverence. Though using both flat wooden panel and stretched canvas paintings, Catholics traditionally have also favored images in the form of three-dimensional statuary, whereas in the East, statuary is much less widely employed.

=== Lutheran view ===
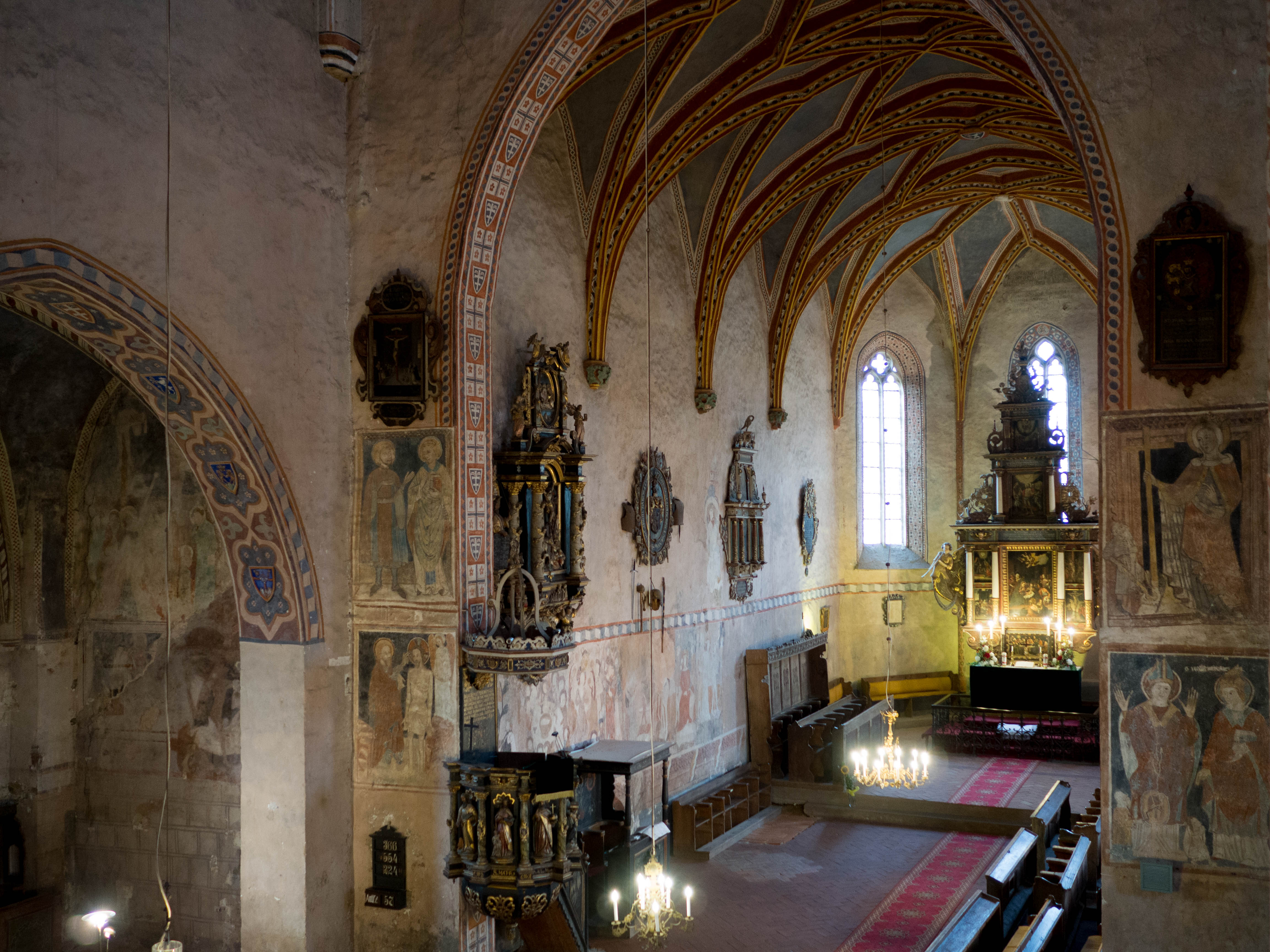
Icons adorn the Lutheran church in Štítnik, Slovakia

In the Lutheran tradition, "icons’ functions are meant to express the theological teaching of the church and to be used as a reminder of such teachings." Icons are often placed on the home altars of Lutheran households to turn the mind toward God.

A joint Lutheran–Orthodox statement made in the 7th Plenary of the Lutheran–Orthodox Joint Commission, in July 1993 in Helsinki, reaffirmed the ecumenical council decisions on the nature of Christ and the veneration of images:

7. As Lutherans and Orthodox we affirm that the teachings of the ecumenical councils are authoritative for our churches. The ecumenical councils maintain the integrity of the teaching of the undivided Church concerning the saving, illuminating/justifying and glorifying acts of God and reject heresies which subvert the saving work of God in Christ. Orthodox and Lutherans, however, have different histories. Lutherans have received the Nicaeno-Constantinopolitan Creed with the addition of the filioque. The Seventh Ecumenical Council, the Second Council of Nicaea in 787, which rejected iconoclasm and restored the veneration of icons in the churches, was not part of the tradition received by the Reformation. Lutherans, however, rejected the iconoclasm of the 16th century, and affirmed the distinction between adoration due to the Triune God alone and all other forms of veneration (CA 21). Through historical research this council has become better known. Nevertheless it does not have the same significance for Lutherans as it does for the Orthodox. Yet, Lutherans and Orthodox are in agreement that the Second Council of Nicaea confirms the christological teaching of the earlier councils and in setting forth the role of images (icons) in the lives of the faithful reaffirms the reality of the incarnation of the eternal Word of God, when it states: "The more frequently, Christ, Mary, the mother of God, and the saints are seen, the more are those who see them drawn to remember and long for those who serve as models, and to pay these icons the tribute of salutation and respectful veneration. Certainly this is not the full adoration in accordance with our faith, which is properly paid only to the divine nature, but it resembles that given to the figure of the honored and life-giving cross, and also to the holy books of the gospels and to other sacred objects" (Definition of the Second Council of Nicaea).

== See also ==
- Analogion – Sloped stand for icons
- Christian symbolism
- Cult image – Human-made object that is venerated for the deity, person, or spirit that it represents
- Holy card – Christian devotional image
- Icon of Christ of Latomos – Miraculous mosaic icon in Greece
- Iconoclasm – Destruction of religious images
- Murti – Religious image in Hinduism
- Orans – Bodily position of prayer
- Panagia Ierosolymitissa – Icon in the Tomb of Mary
- Podea – Apron hung at the bottom of a religious icon
- Proskynetarion – Term suggesting worship and reverence, and name of several works
- Religious image – Work of visual art with a religious purpose
- Riza – Metal cover protecting an icon
- Warsaw Icon Museum – Museum in Warsaw, Poland

== Sources ==
- Beckwith, John (1979). Early Christian and Byzantine Art. Penguin History of Art series (2nd ed.). ISBN 0-14-056033-5.
