= Acts of John in Rome =

The Acts of John in Rome is a 4th-century Christian apocryphal text that presents stories about the Apostle John. The text, written in Greek, is believed to be based on orally handed down stories (and in particular collected stories recounted in the writings of Eusebius of Caesarea) about the works of John in Rome.

The Acts of John in Rome is not to be confused with the Acts of John, of which it is independent, although the final section of the Acts of John exists also in the latter part of the Acts of John in Rome.

== Content ==
The story is divided into two parts: the first contains a series of original episodes from the life of John up until his exile to Patmos and his subsequent return to Ephesus. The second, which reproduces the final section of the text Acts of John, relates the apostle's ministry in Ephesus.

The first part of the story centers around John's arrest by Roman soldiers in Ephesus, his transport to Rome, and his (informal) trial before the Roman emperor Domitian, during which John miraculously survives the drinking of deadly poison and raises a Roman prisoner from the dead.

== Manuscript ==
The transliterated title of the Greek manuscript is "Acts of the Holy Apostle and Evangelist John the Theologian", with the subtitle "Of His Exile and His Passage". The name "Acts of John in Rome" is a modern title given by scholars to distinguish it from the Acts of John, since the major characteristic of these "Acts of John in Rome" differentiating it from the "Acts of John" is that most of the episodes are set in Rome (rather than Ephesus). Note that despite the title transmitted by the manuscripts, the text does not mention the writing of the Fourth Gospel. On the other hand, the text mentions the Book of Revelation.

== See also ==
- Acts of the Apostles (genre)
- Johannine literature
- John the Evangelist
- John of Patmos
