= Acts of John =

Biblical apocrypha

The Acts of John refers to a collection of stories about John the Apostle that began circulating in written form as early as the 2nd-century AD. Translations of the Acts of John in modern languages have been reconstructed by scholars from a number of manuscripts of later date. The Acts of John are generally classified as New Testament apocrypha.

== The Acts of John and other stories about John ==
Numerous stories about John and other apostles began circulating in the 2nd century AD. These stories trace to a variety of different authors and contexts, and were revised and retold in many different forms and languages over the centuries. Sometimes episodes that had originally circulated independently were combined with other stories to form collections about an apostle, and sometimes episodes that had originally been part of multi-episode collections were detached and circulated independently. Most extant manuscripts of such stories also date to a period considerably after they first began circulating.

These factors can make it difficult to reconstruct the earliest forms of stories about the apostle John, and scholars continue to debate as to which episodes originally belonged together. One set of stories, in which John appears before Domitian in Rome and survives drinking deadly poison, appears in some old translations of the Acts of John, but is no longer considered to have the same origins as other episodes. It is now known as the Acts of John in Rome, and understood to be a separate tradition.

== Content of modern versions of the Acts of John ==
=== Overview ===
Most current scholars agree that even the most recent versions of the Acts of John include episodes that trace to multiple different dates and origins. These versions contain roughly the following sections:

A. Stories about John in Ephesus (ActsJohn 18-55, 58-86). These consist of the following sections:

- An introduction or transition (ActsJohn 18). (The original beginning of the story has been lost.)
- Conversion of Cleopatra and Lycomedes (ActsJohn 19–29)
- Healing at the Ephesian Theatre (ActsJohn 30–36)
- Conversion at the Temple of Artemis (ActsJohn 37–47)
- The Parricide (ActsJohn 48–54)
- Summons from Smyrna (ActsJohn 55)
- Story of the Bedbugs (ActsJohn 58–62)
- Callimachus and Drusiana (ActsJohn 63–86)

B. A long piece of text in which John recounts earlier experiences he had with Jesus before and during the cross event (ActsJohn 87-105).

C. The Metastasis, an account of John’s death (ActsJohn 106–115).

Many scholars consider the material that is conventionally labelled chs. 94–102 to be of a later origin than the episodes in sections A and C, and some assign all of section B to a separate origin.

=== Section A ===
The cycle of stories labelled section A above begins as John is approaching Ephesus with some travelling companions. He is met by Lycomedes, a notable and powerful figure within the city. Lycomedes recounts a vision he received from the God of John, telling him that a man from Miletus was coming to heal his wife, Cleopatra, who had died seven days before from illness. Upon arrival, Lycomedes curses his situation and, despite John's pleas to have faith that his wife will be brought back to life by the power of his god, dies of grief. The entire city of Ephesus is stirred by his death and comes to his house to see his body. John then asks Christ to raise both of them from the dead in order to prove Christ's own might, quoting Matthew 7:7 in his request. Both Cleopatra and Lycomedes are resurrected, leaving the people of Ephesus in awe of the miracle that was performed before them.

In another scene, during a festival celebrating the birthday of the Greek goddess Artemis, the people of Ephesus attempt to kill John because he wears black, rather than white, to her temple. John rebukes them, threatening to have his god kill them if they are unable to convince their goddess to make him die on the spot with her divine power. Knowing that John has performed many miracles in their city, the people at the temple beg John not to destroy them. John then changes his mind, using the power of God instead to break the altar of Artemis in many pieces, damage the offerings and idols within the temple, and collapse half of the structure itself on top of its priest, killing him. Upon seeing this destruction, the people immediately see the error of their ways and acknowledge the God of John as the only true god.

In one comical episode, John and his companions stay overnight at an inn plagued with a bedbug infestation. Immediately after lying down, the author and the other men with him see that John is troubled by the bugs and hear him tell the insects, "I say to you, you bugs, be considerate; leave your home for this night and go to rest in a place which is far away from the servants of God!" The next morning, the narrator and two of his travelling companions, Verus and Andronicus, awake to find the bugs gathered in the doorway, waiting to return to their home in John's mattress. The three men wake John, who allows the creatures to return to the bed because of their obedience to the will of God.

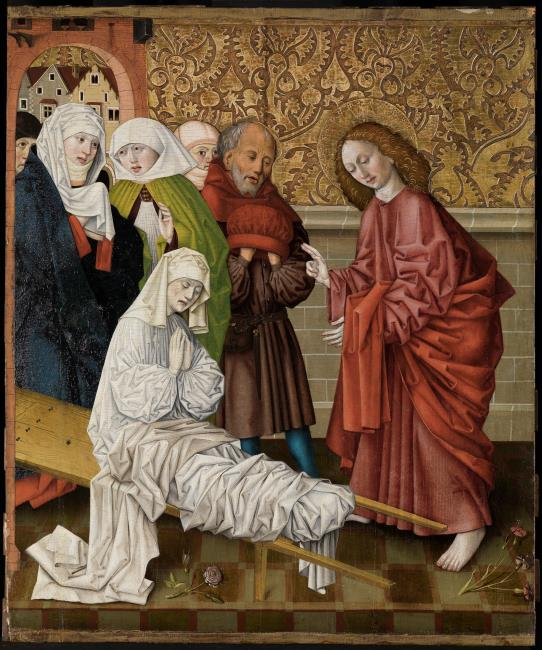
John raises Drusiana, panel painting from 1450s Salzburg

The traveling party then journeys to the house of Andronicus in Ephesus. Here, the reader learns that Andronicus is married to Drusiana. Both are followers of John's God and exercise continence even in marriage out of piety. However, Drusiana's continence does not prevent the advances of Callimachus, a prominent member of the Ephesian community and "a servant of Satan." Learning of Callimachus' lust, Drusiana falls sick and dies because she believes she has contributed to Callimachus's sin. While John is comforting Andronicus and many of the other inhabitants of Ephesus over the loss of Drusiana, Callimachus, determined to have Drusiana as his own, bribes Andronicus's steward, Fortunatus to help him gain access to her tomb and rape her corpse. A poisonous snake appears, which bites and kills Fortunatus and curls up on Callimachus, pinning him down. The latter sees a beautiful youth, a supernatural figure, who commands him to "die, that you may live." The next day, John and Andronicus enter the tomb of Drusiana and are greeted by the beautiful youth, which the narrative later identifies with Christ, who tells John he is supposed to raise Drusiana back to life before ascending into Heaven. John does so, but not before resurrecting Callimachus in order to learn what had occurred the previous night. Callimachus recounts the events of the night and is repentant of his misgivings, surrendering to the will of Christ. After both Callimachus and Drusiana are resurrected, Drusiana, feeling sorry for the other aggressor involved in the conspiracy to molest her dead body, is granted the ability to raise Fortunatus back from the dead against the wishes of Callimachus. Fortunatus, unwilling to accept Christ, flees from the tomb and eventually dies due to blood poisoning brought about by the snake from the initial bite.

=== Section B ===
In Section B, which many scholars consider to come from a different source than the other episodes, John recounts earlier experiences he had with Jesus before and during the cross event.

Part of this account includes a circular dance initiated by Jesus, who says, "Before I am delivered to them, let us sing a hymn to the Father and so go to meet what lies before us". Directed to form a circle around him, holding hands and dancing, the apostles cry "Amen" to the hymn of Jesus. Embedded in the text is a hymn (sections 94 – 96) that some consider to have originally been "a liturgical song (with response) in some Johannine communities" (Davis). In the summer of 1916 Gustav Holst set his own translation from the Greek (Head), influenced by G.R.S. Mead, as The Hymn of Jesus for two mixed choirs, a semi-chorus of female voices, and a large orchestra (Trippett).

The Transfiguration of Jesus is also featured in this Act. It is notable for its depiction of a nude Jesus. It contains the same main cast (John, Peter, James, and Jesus) but does not feature the appearance of Elijah or Moses, unlike the transfiguration scenes from the synoptic gospels (notably not featured in the actual Gospel of John).

At another time he took me and James and Peter to the mountain, where he used to pray, and we beheld such a light on him that it is not possible for a man who uses mortal speech to describe what it was like…Now I, because he loved me, went to him quietly as though he should not see, and stood looking upon his back. And I saw that he was not dressed in garments, but was seen by us as naked and not at all like a man; his feet were whiter than snow, so that the ground there was lit up by his feet, and his head reached to heaven.

— Chapter 90 (Translation by Bart Ehrman)

Section B also contains most of the docetic themes present in the Acts of John. Jesus is depicted in several chapters as having a constantly shifting form and an immaterial body.

Sometimes when I meant to touch him, I met a material and solid body; and at other times again when I felt him, the substance was immaterial and bodiless and as if it were not existing at all.

— Chapter 93 (Translation by Bart Ehrman)

A docetic theme of Jesus' body as inhuman and unable to feel physical pain presents a problem with the idea of the suffering of Christ in orthodox Christianity. Ideas about the nature of Jesus vary widely within different gnostic sects. Scholarship is divided on whether this depiction of the Passion should be interpreted as Jesus suffering spiritually, physically, or both. Jesus speaks cryptically about this suffering on the cross in Chapter 101, saying:

“Therefore I have suffered none of the things which they will say of me: that suffering which I showed to you..., I wish it to be called a mystery. For what you are, you see that I showed you; but what I am, that I alone know, and no one else… As for seeing me as I am in reality, I have told you this is impossible unless you are able to see me as my kinsman. You hear that I suffered, yet I suffered not; that I suffered not, yet I did suffer, that I was pierced, yet was I not wounded; hanged, and I was not hanged; that blood flowed from me, yet it did not flow; and, in a word, those things that they say of me I did not endure, and the things that they do not say those I suffered.”

— Chapter 101 (Translation by Bart Ehrman)

While the changing body of Jesus is used as evidence for its docetic (therefore gnostic) themes, it is argued by some scholars that this "polymorphic christology" is part of the Johannine Christian literary tradition and not be understood as inherently gnostic. This motif developed in the second century and used by both "proto-orthodox" and non-orthodox ("heretical") Christian communities. For gnostic communities, the "portrayal of a polymorphic Christ is used to denote transcendence over the material realm, whereas for the [proto-orthodox communities] they illustrate that Jesus is not constrained by the forces of mortality, but rather that he has entered a higher state of physical existence." Polymorphic themes appear in several other Apocryphal Acts about apostles, such as Acts of Peter and Acts of Thecla. Origen, a third century Christian scholar from Alexandria, did not view the polymorphic nature of Jesus as problematic, saying "although Jesus was one, he had several aspects, and to those who saw him he did not appear alike to all".

=== Section C ===
Section C recounts John's presumed death by natural causes after directing his companions to dig a trench in which he lies down and buries himself alive before he "[gives] up his spirit rejoicing".

== Dating and history ==
Many scholars think that versions of the episode considered to belong to the Acts of John were already circulating in the second century.

The names of any authors involved in the project are unknown. One older tradition associated the texts with one Leucius Charinus, a companion of John, but his name does not appear in the text and modern scholars do not think he was involved in composing them.

Some version of the Acts of John containing at least portions of Section B and the Lycomedes episode was rejected as heretical by the Second Council of Nicaea in AD 787. The exact contents of the Acts of John known to participants in the Council is unknown.

The Stichometry of Nicephorus, a ninth century stichometry, gives the length of an Acts of John text as 2,500 lines.

Polymorphic christology, seen in Section B, developed mostly during the second century, lending credence to the second century development date.

== In culture ==
The composer Gustav Holst wrote The Hymn of Jesus, a work for choir and orchestra and first performed in 1920, with lyrics based on his own personal translation of the Acts of John.

== See also ==
- Acts of the Apostles (genre)
- Johannine literature
- John the Evangelist
- John of Patmos

== Bibliography ==
- Ehrman, Bart (2003a). Lost Christianities: The Battles for Scripture and The Faiths We Never Knew. Oxford University Press. ISBN 0-19-514183-0.
- Ehrman, Bart, ed. (2003b). Lost Scriptures: Books that did not make it into the New Testament. Oxford: Oxford University Press. ISBN 978-0-19-518250-7.
