= Fall of Simon Magus (Pompeo Batoni) =

Painting by Pompeo Batoni

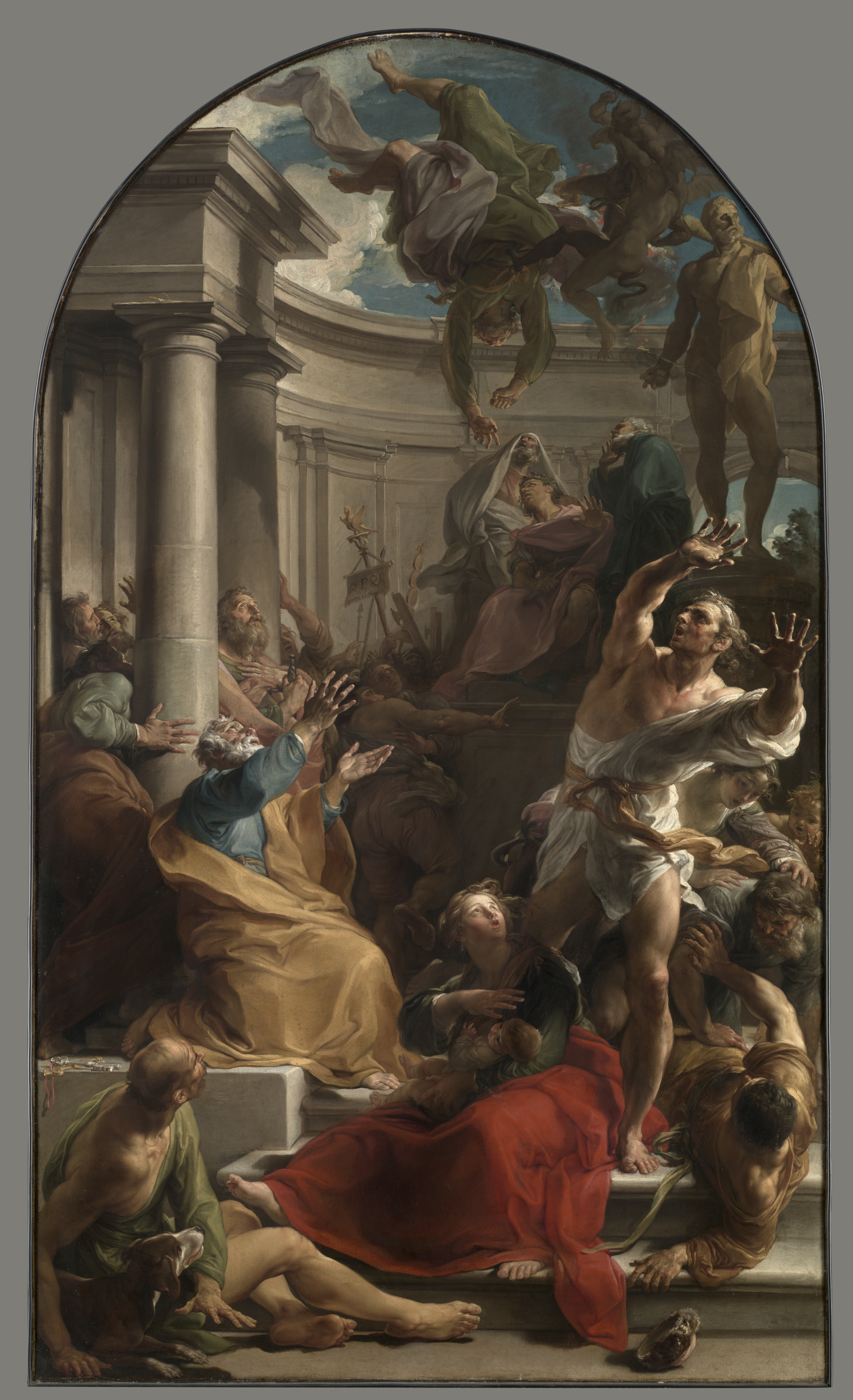
- Artist: Pompeo Batoni
- Year: 1745–1750
- Medium: Oil on canvas
- Dimensions: 183 cm × 108 cm (72 in × 43 in)
- Location: Cleveland Museum of Art; Cleveland, Ohio

The Fall of Simon Magus (Italian: Caduta di Simon Mago) is a late Baroque painting by Pompeo Batoni, originally intended as the basis for a mosaic altarpiece in St. Peter's Basilica. The painting in the Cleveland Museum of Art is likely a studio copy of the original, which was displayed in the church of Santa Maria degli Angeli, Rome.

== Description ==
The topic is based on an incident similarly recounted in the Acts of Peter and Acts of Peter and Paul, two apocryphal gospels. In the latter, both Peter and Paul are present in Rome; Simon Magus to astound the apostles with his power to levitate, flies off a high structure, but Peter, with his prayers, is able to confound the demons holding Simon aloft, and the sorcerer falls to his death. Putatively this occurs in front of the emperor Nero.

In the painting, Simon is caught in free-fall, his demons to his right are dispersing, his fur-cap is already on the ground. The emperor in his throne, and many of the audience are either perplexed or scurry in fear. The emperor is flanked by a statue of Hercules, and a pell-mell of legionnaire standards, fasces, and a banner with the abbreviation SPQR. The white-haired, elder Peter, in his blue tunic, kneels with his keys near his feet, while the younger Saint Paul, in his green tunic, holding the sword, looks upward in admiration.

The topic was appropriate for the Basilica of St Peter, specially since it was a demonstration of the power of the First Pope against nonconforming and pagan ideas. In his elegy on Batoni, Onofrio Boni mentions that the image was rejected for a reproduction as a mosaic. Batoni had altered a previous model of the scene by Francesco Vanni, this time making the figures grander. It is said that Anton Raphael Mengs was commissioned a replacement design, but changed the subject.
