= Domine, quo vadis? =

Painting by Annibale Carracci

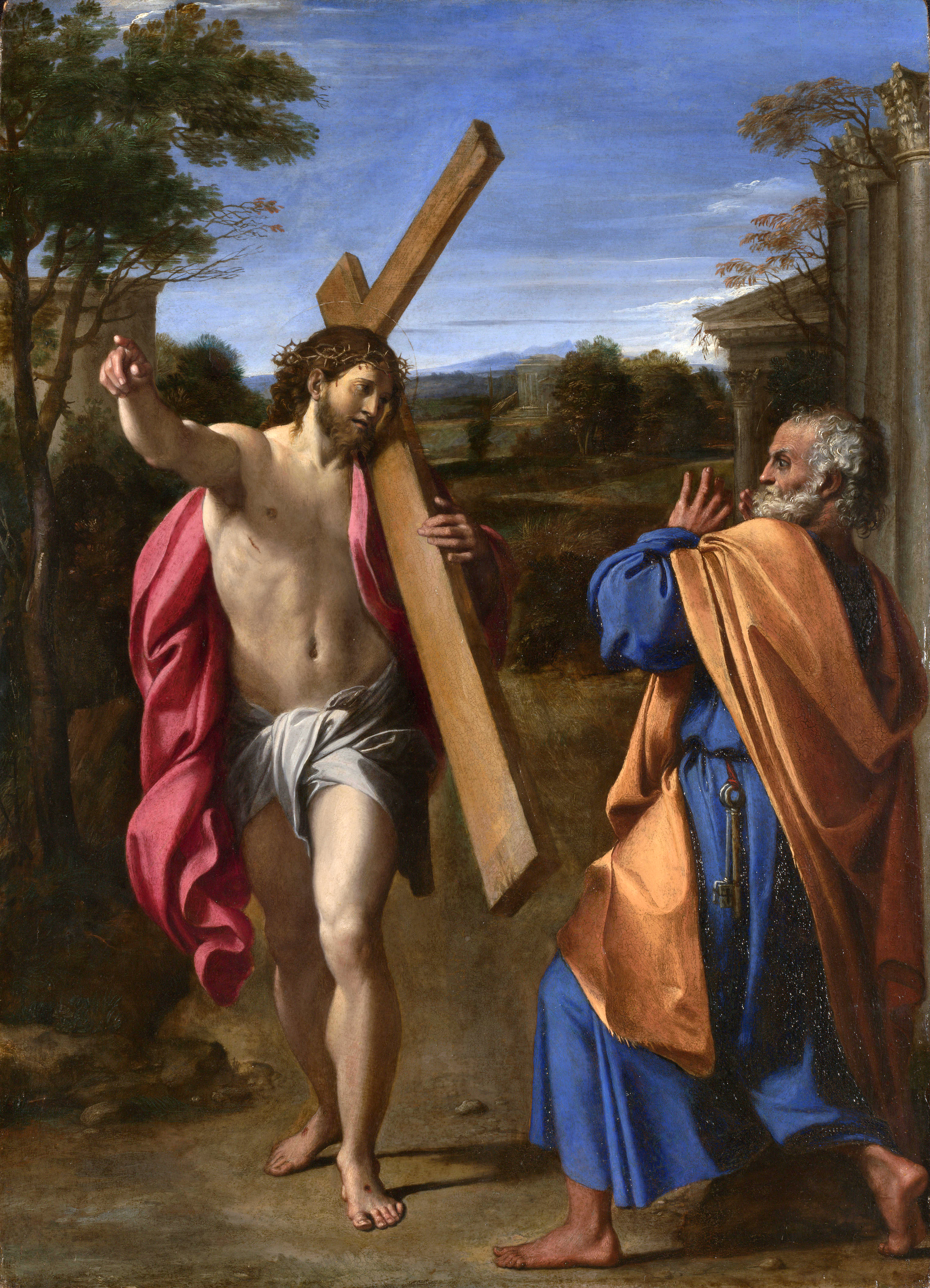
- Artist: Annibale Carracci
- Year: c. 1601–02
- Medium: Oil on panel
- Dimensions: 77 cm × 56 cm (30 in × 22 in)
- Location: National Gallery, London

Domine, quo vadis? is a 1602 painting by the Italian Baroque painter Annibale Carracci (1560–1609), depicting a scene from the apocryphal Acts of Peter. It is housed in the National Gallery, where it is given the title Christ appearing to Saint Peter on the Appian Way. The subject is a rare representation in art of the theme Quo vadis. Annibale Carracci was the founder of the Italian Baroque painting school, called Bolognese School. This painting is one of his best known works. Peter is depicted fleeing Rome to avoid crucifixion and has a vision of meeting Christ bearing his Cross. Peter asks Jesus "Quo vadis?" to which he replies, "Romam vado iterum crucifigi" ("I am going to Rome to be crucified again"). Peter returns to Rome after this vision.

== Painting ==
The work depicts a scene featured in the apocryphal Acts of Peter. Saint Peter, while fleeing Rome along the ancient Via Appia, meets Christ outside the city, who is walking in the opposite direction towards the city, carrying his cross. Peter asks him, Domine, quo vadis? The question is in Latin and means "Lord, where are you going?" Jesus replies, Eo Romam iterum crucifigi, which means: "I am going to Rome to be crucified again."

The scene as catalogued in the apocryphal Acts of St. Peter, describes Peter who is fleeing Rome at the time of Emperor Nero's persecution. This encounter is reminiscent of Peter's denial, when Peter chose to deny Jesus three times during his passion and crucifixion. Saint Peter realizes that he is on his way to making the same mistake all over again now, abandoning Jesus and His church in a moment of danger. Peter turns around when he understands that this was a sign, and returns to Rome to face the martyrdom. It was commissioned by Cardinal Pietro Aldobrandini, and was kept in the Aldobrandini Collection recorded in 1603.

The artwork blends two differing styles; both illustrating the typical Baroque approach to the subject. The colours were influenced by the Venetian School's rich colours, while the figures were monumental. This new style attempts to bring back the spirit of the classicism found in Michelangelo and Raphael's works, into Annibale's style; it came at a time Annibale entered an important new phase of creativity. Carracci used to draw also a lot after live models. In Domine, quo vadis? Carracci has portrayed Christ as a muscular athlete easily carrying the cross on his shoulder as he passes St Peter, with a dramatic gesture, bursting forth on the canvas. This new era took on a dramatic feel with a leaning towards intensifying movement and "figures [that] are rich in dignity". Peter originally had a straighter posture, but Annibale changed this in order to illustrate the emotional shock of Peter coming across Jesus. The paintings included references to classical antiquity, including architecture like temples and columns; the scale of the individuals was increased by bringing them into closer proximity to the surface giving the impression that they would emerge from the painting.

== See also ==
- Church of Domine Quo Vadis
