= Pontius Pilate's wife =

Wife of Pontius Pilate, venerated as a saint in Eastern Churches

Saint Procla
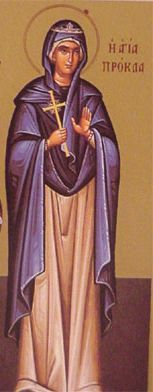
- Greek icon of Saint Procla (Hagia Prokla)

Governess of Judea Widow and Martyr
- Venerated in: Eastern Orthodox Church; Oriental Orthodox Churches; Eastern Catholic Churches
- Feast: 27 October (Eastern Orthodox, Eastern Catholic); 25 June (Ethiopian Orthodox)

The unnamed wife of Pontius Pilate appears only once in the Gospel of Matthew (27:19), where she intercedes with Pilate on Jesus' behalf. It is uncertain whether Pilate was actually married, although it is likely. In later tradition, she becomes known as Procula (Latin: Procula), Procla (Ancient Greek: Πρόκλα) or Procle and plays a role in various New Testament Apocrypha. At a later date, she acquires the name Claudia Procula in Western tradition, as well as other names and variants of these names. She is venerated as a saint by the Eastern Orthodox Church, the Eastern Catholic Church, the Coptic Church, and the Ethiopian Church. She has also frequently been featured in literature and film.

== Name ==
Pilate's wife is left nameless in her only early mention, the Gospel of Matthew. She is one of several women identified in the Bible only by their relationships to their husbands.

The cognomen Procula (in Latin) or Prokla (in Greek) for Pilate's wife first appears in the Gospel of Nicodemus (5th c.) and the chronicle of John Malalas (6th c.). This name is relatively stable for her both in eastern and western Christianity. Ernst von Dobschütz suggested that the name might have come from the Fasti consulares for 37 CE, which records the death in that year of Gnaeus Acerronius Proculus, co-consul of Gaius Petronius Pontius Nigrinus, thus providing the names Proculus and Pontius together. Heinrich Paulus, among others, has proposed that the name arose from a transcription error in the Latin text that took the Latin word procul (far off) to be the name Procula. Others believe that it may accurately reflect the cognomen of Pilate's wife. (Note: "[I]t does seem likely that her cognomen was Procla." "Procula is most probably accurate.")

Jill Carington Smith, seconded by Tibor Grüll, assert that the name first appears in the works of Saint Jerome (347 to 430). Roland Kany has however argued that the earliest extant reference to her as Claudia Procula is the Pseudo-Dexter Chronicle, a forgery first published in 1619. Ian Boxall writes that the name probably became Claudia Procula with Pseudo-Dexter "regular claims to the contrary notwithstanding." Claudia Procula was not an uncommon name in antiquity: the graves of several women named Claudia Procula have been uncovered, from Beirut (Roman Syria), Cyrene (Libya), and Patara (modern Turkey), and it is also a plausible name for a daughter of a certain Claudius Proculus named in a letter by the emperor Hadrian.

The twelfth-century Syrian theologian Dionysius Bar-Salibi gives her name as Longina. In medieval drama Pilate's wife is often given names such as Livia or Pilatessa, and further variants are found in more recent works.

== Historical and biblical origins ==
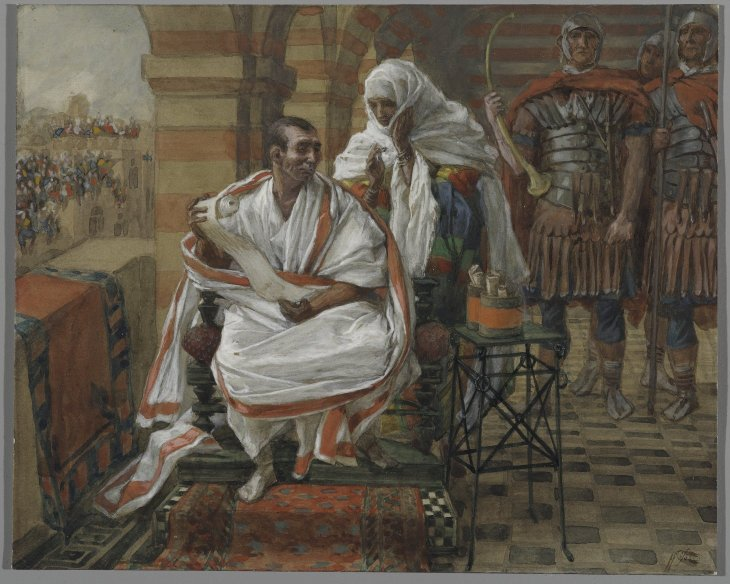
The Message of Pilate's Wife (1886–94) by James Tissot (Brooklyn Museum)

It is likely that Pontius Pilate was married. It is possible that his wife accompanied him to his post as governor of Judaea (26–36/37 CE); while governors were forbidden to bring their wives to their posts under the Republic and Augustus, the law was later repealed by the Senate. Jean-Pierre Lémonon says this most likely took place during the reign of Tiberius, while Alexander Demandt gives 20 CE as the year that the rule was abolished. However, the only early mention of Pilate's wife is a single sentence in the Gospel of Matthew (late 1st century CE):

And while [Pilate] was sitting on the judgment-seat, his wife sent unto him, saying, Have thou nothing to do with that righteous man; for I have suffered many things this day in a dream because of him. (Matthew 27:19, American Standard Version)

However, according to scholars Demandt, Helen Bond, and Jean-Pierre Lémonon, this mention is legendary rather than historical. Raymond E. Brown suggested that the episode has been modeled according to a common trope, found in the works of the Jewish historian Josephus, in which a noble pagan woman is favorable towards Judaism.

In the early sixteenth-century, François de Bivar suggested, based on Pilate's wife's name in later tradition, that the Claudia mentioned by Paul in Second Timothy (2 Timothy 4:21) might have been Pilate's wife. Colum Hourihane discounts this possibility, however.

=== Archaeology ===
In the 1920s, a lead sarcophagus was discovered in Beirut containing two bracelets inscribed with the name Claudia Procula in Greek (ΚΛΑΥΔ/ΙΑ ΠΡΟ/ΚΛΑ and ΚΛΑΥΔ/ ΠΡΟΚΛΑ respectively). René Mouterde dated the find to the third century, possibly the early third century, although he noted that some elements appeared much more archaic in style. He suggests that it is possible that the author of the Gospel of Nicodemus may have been inspired by the death of this woman to name Pilate's wife after her, although he notes that there is no evidence to connect the Gospel of Nicodemus with Beirut.

Primarily on the basis of the grave goods found with the sarcophagus, but also taking into account the archaic features noted by Mouterde, Jill Carington Smith redated the find to the last three quarters of the first century CE. Smith notes that this is a time period when it is plausible that the woman could have been the wife of Pontius Pilate, though she notes that there is no evidence that Pilate was ever in Beirut and the name Claudia Procula is attested elsewhere. She concludes: "If this date [last three quarters of the first century] is accepted, the possibility that this was in fact Pilate's wife, though unlikely, cannot be entirely excluded."

== Later Christian tradition ==
Attitudes toward Pilate and his wife varied by region. In general, Pilate was revered in the Eastern churches, and despised in the Western churches. Pilate's wife, as Saint Procla, is venerated by the Oriental Orthodox Churches and the Eastern Orthodox Church as well as the Eastern Catholic Church. The Eastern Orthodox Church celebrates Procla on October 27, while the Oriental Orthodox Churches celebrates both her and her husband as saints on June 25. The earliest references to Procla's conversion to Christianity date from the second-century Christian apologist Origen.

In the Western Church, Pilate's wife was never canonized and her dream was often interpreted as coming from the devil, who wished to prevent salvation. This interpretation can be found in figures such as medieval theologians Rabanus Maurus, Bede, and Bernard of Clairvaux, as well as Protestant reformer Martin Luther. Other Western Christians, such as Saint Augustine, Saint Jerome, and Protestant reformer John Calvin, argued for a divine origin of the dream, but without holding Pilate's wife to be a saint.

=== New Testament Apocrypha ===
The most important text to feature Procla is the Gospel of Nicodemus, also called The Acts of Pilate, which expands on her mention in Matthew 27:19. In the Gospel of Nicodemus, Pilate's wife sends a messenger to Pilate rather than telling him of her dream herself, and the Jews accuse Jesus of using sorcery to send the dream. Pilate describes Procula, when speaking to the Jews, as pious and as practicing the Jewish religion. In some versions of the text, both Pilate and Procula are depicted as present at the crucifixion, and so saddened by Jesus's death that they cannot eat or drink.

The Paradosis Pilati (5th c.), a Greek text which is sometimes attached to the Gospel of Nicodemus, has extremely high regard for Pilate and Procula, writing them as martyrs. In it, Tiberius orders the beheading of Pilate for the crime of executing Jesus. Pilate indicates that Procula already serves the Christian God; in a divine vision, Pilate is reassured that he was merely fulfilling his role in achieving God's prophecies. An angel takes up Pilate's severed head to heaven; Procula dies of joy when she sees the angel receive her husband, and the two are buried together. In the apocryphal Acts of Paul (c. 160 CE), Pilate's wife is baptized by Paul the Apostle and quickly shows signs of sainthood.

The Evangelium Gamalielis, possibly of medieval origin and preserved in Arabic, Coptic, and Ge'ez (Ethiopic), Pilate is crucified for being a Christian and Procla weeps at the foot of his cross; however, he is miraculously rescued and the two are baptized by a light from heaven. Pilate is then executed by beheading, and Procla, not present at the beheading, is found to have died on the same day as her husband. The Martyrium Pilati, possibly of medieval origin and preserved in Arabic, Coptic, and Ge'ez, opens with a portrayal of the now Christian Procula's charital actions. The text ends with Pilate's wife and Pilate, as well as their two children, being crucified twice, once by the Jews and once by Tiberius, for their faith.

In the "Book of the Cock", a Late-Antique apocryphal passion Gospel only preserved in Ge'ez, but clearly translated from an Arabic source, Procla (Abroqla) enters Pilate's court with her daughters Dorta and Mäkara, who are deaf and mute, when Jesus is brought to Pilate. Jesus cures the daughters of their deafness and muteness, and, after speaking to her sisters and her brother's wife, Procla petitions Pilate to release Jesus. Procla and the other members of Pilate's family declare they are ready to die for Jesus. She writes a letter to the Jewish leaders saying that Jesus is the son of God, but Jesus picks up the letter and it changes to say that Procla is blessed and will be rewarded. This book enjoys "a quasi-canonical status" among Ethiopian Christians to this day and continues to be read beside the canonical gospels during Holy Week.

=== Later legends ===
The early ninth century Old Saxon poem Heliand, a rhyming harmonization of the gospels, portrays the dream of Pilate's wife as coming from Satan, who fears that if Christ is crucified Hell will become empty of sinners. This portrayal followed a common interpretation of the dream in Western Christianity, which can be found in the works of Hrabanus Maurus (c. 780–856), Bernard of Clairvaux (1290–1153), and others.

In the Slavonic Josephus, an Old Church Slavonic translation of the Jewish historian Josephus with many legendary additions, Jesus heals Pilate's dying wife.

According to later Western Christian legend, influenced by her name in Pseudo-Dexter, Claudia Procula was a member of the Julio-Claudian dynasty, the illegitimate daughter of Caesar Augustus's daughter Julia the Elder. Julia had been married to Tiberius, but he divorced and exiled her due to her immoderate lifestyle. While in exile, Julia gave birth to Claudia Procula, who was legitimized by Tiberius after Julia's death.

== Christian art and plays ==
=== Visual art ===
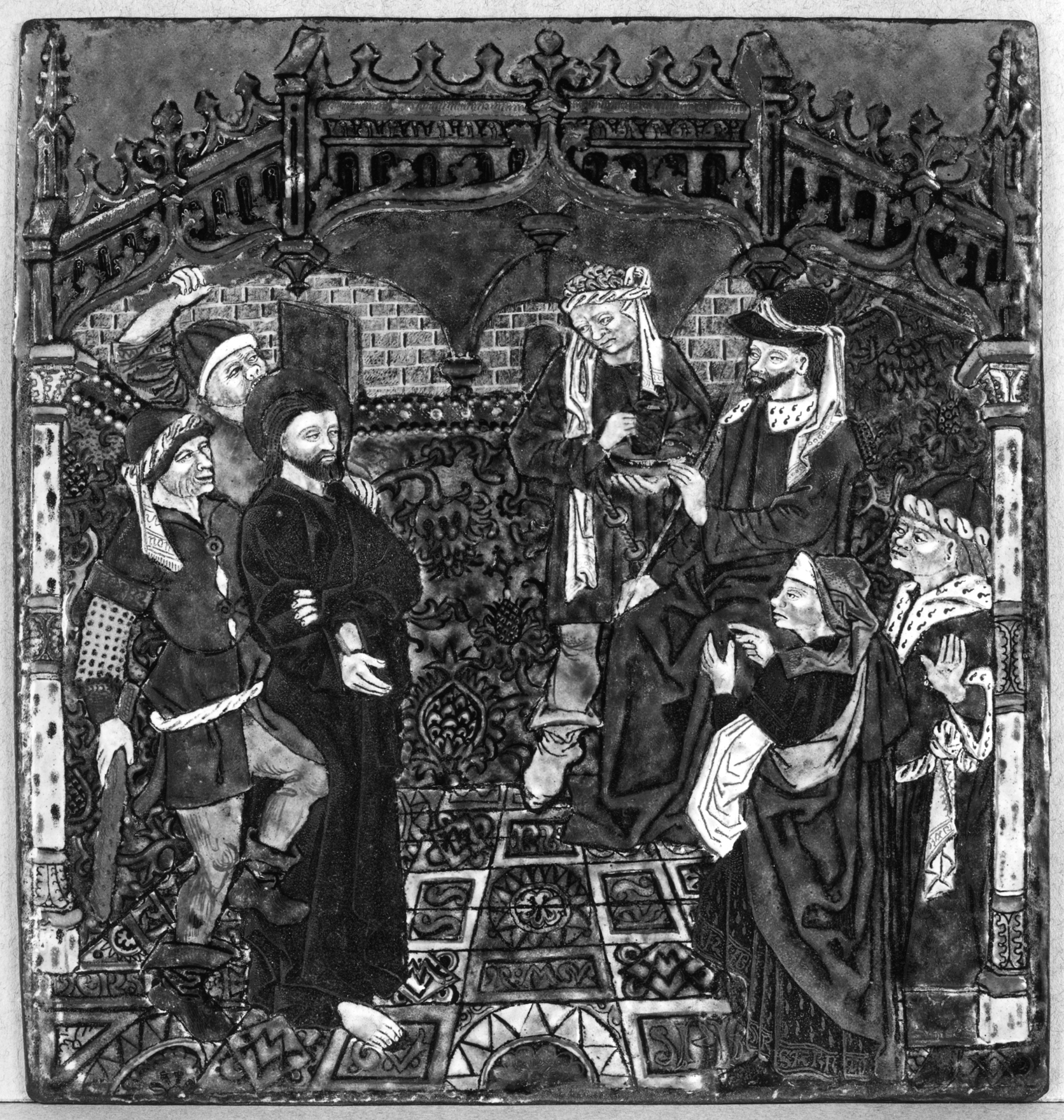
Christ before Pontius Pilate, late 15th-century Limoges enamel by Monvaerni Master (Walters Art Museum): "... Pilate is flanked [...] on his left by the attendant sent by Pilate's wife to warn him"

The earliest depictions of Procula occur as disembodied heads near Pilate, depicting her warning him of her dream. The earliest surviving image comes from Fulda in the Ottonian period and dates to c. 970–980. The earliest full-body depictions of Procula occur in the eleventh century. She typically stands behind him, sometimes whispering in his ear, while other representations of Matthew's version of the scene in Pilate's court may depict an intermediary delivering the message of Pilate's wife to her husband. Although Procula is venerated as a saint in Eastern Christianity, very few images of her come from there. She is frequently depicted in German-speaking Europe.

=== Mystery plays ===
Pilate's wife is a major character in the 30th York Mystery Play (Tapiters' and Couchers' Play), where she introduces herself as "Dame Precious Percula". Her dream is dictated by the Devil. He first soliloquises to the effect that if Jesus dies, he, the Devil, will lose control of men's souls. He then tells the sleeping Percula that Jesus is innocent, and that if he is condemned, she and Pilate will lose their privileged position. She wakes and sends a message to Pilate, but Annas and Caiaphas succeed in convincing him that her dream was inspired by Jesus' witchcraft.

== Modern reception ==
=== Modern literature ===
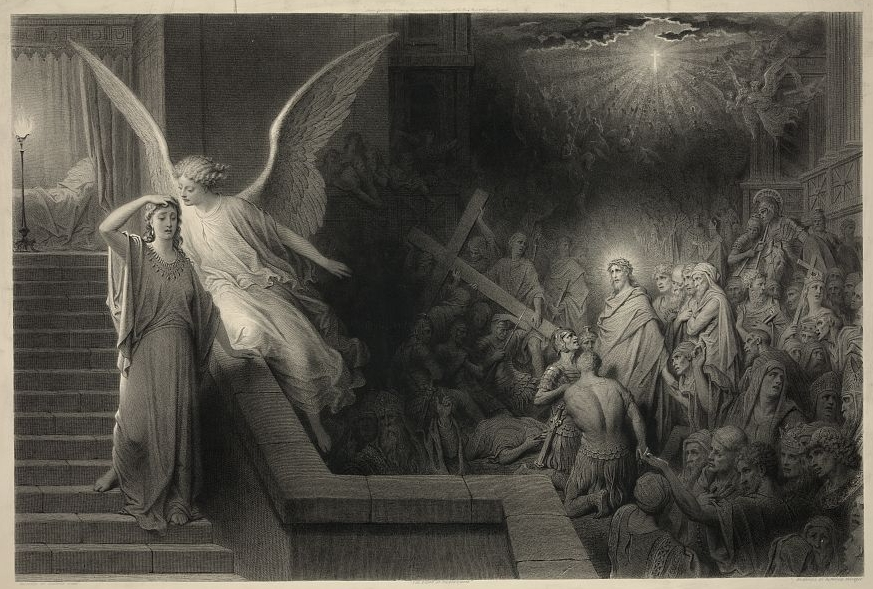
The Dream of Pilate's Wife (c. 1879), engraving by Alphonse François, after Gustave Doré

Pilate's wife has appeared in a number of poems, novels, and plays in the modern period.

Aemilia Lanyer's volume of poems Salve Deus Rex Judaeorum (1611) contains a poem of the same title, in which Pilate's wife is the main speaker. She makes reference to the Fall of Adam and Eve, and argues that Pilate's sin in killing Christ abrogates the curse on Eve, since Pilate sinned by not listening to his wife (unlike Adam, who sinned by hearkening to the voice of Eve).

In the German poet Friedrich Gottlieb Klopstock's Christian epic The Messiah (published in installments from 1748 to 1773), Pilate's wife (called Portia) is visited by Mary, Mother of Jesus to warn her husband not to sin by executing Jesus. Portia then has a dream of the pagan philosopher Socrates, who also warns her not to execute Jesus.

The Dolorous Passion of Our Lord Jesus Christ According to the Meditations of Anne Catherine Emmerich (1833), supposedly a transcription of visions experienced by the German nun Anne Catherine Emmerich but in fact composed by German romantic poet Clemens Brentano, greatly increased popular awareness of Pilate's wife (called Claudia Procles) in the West. The text portrays Claudia Procles as a major character who has several dreams rather than one. Most significantly, Emmerich sees Claudia Procles send the Virgin Mary pieces of linen in order to wipe up the blood from the flagellation of Christ. Another well-known 19th-century work about Pilate's wife is the poem Pilate's Wife's Dream by Charlotte Brontë.

"Perhaps best known" among fiction concerning Pilate's wife is Gertrud von Le Fort's 1955 novel Die Frau des Pilatus (Pilate's Wife). Le Fort depicts the suffering in Claudia Procula's dream as imagining many people across the centuries praying the Apostles' Creed's words "Suffered under Pontius Pilate, was crucified, died, and was buried." When Pilate and Procula return to Rome, she begins secretly attending Christian gatherings. She takes on Pilate's guilt for his execution of Jesus and he executes her as well, in a scene in which she is baptized in blood and made a martyr.

=== In film and television ===
Majel Coleman plays Pilate's wife, identified as Proculla, in Cecil B. DeMille's silent production of The King of Kings (1927).

In the French film Golgotha (Julian Duvivier, 1935), Golgotha Pilate's wife, Claudia Procula, is played by Edwige Feuillère.

On television, Pilate's wife was played by Joan Leslie in the 1951 Family Theater episode "Hill Number One" (also starring James Dean as John the Apostle), and by Geraldine Fitzgerald in the 1952 Studio One episode "Pontius Pilate" (where Procula is depicted as half-Jewish, and is brought before Pilate as a Christian rebel herself, fifteen years after Jesus' death).

Cinematic appearances for the character include the film Day of Triumph (1954, played by Barbara Billingsley), the film King of Kings (1961, played by Viveca Lindfors—in which the character is identified as the daughter of the Emperor Tiberius), the Italian film Ponzio Pilato (1962, played by Jeanne Crain) and the epic The Greatest Story Ever Told (1965, played by Angela Lansbury). Also, Marjorie Lord performed the role of Claudia Procula on stage in 1963.

John Cleese played her in Monty Python's Life of Brian (1979). Hope Lange played Pontius Pilate's wife in the 1980 made-for-television film The Day Christ Died. The character is also depicted in the film The Inquiry (1986) in which she is played by Phyllis Logan, as well as in that film's 2006 remake, played by Anna Kanakis.

In The Passion of the Christ (2004), she is known as Claudia Procles (and played by Claudia Gerini). In this film, Claudia succeeds in convincing Pilate not to pass judgment personally condemning Jesus, but fails in her effort to lobby him to directly save Jesus, and consoles Jesus' mother Mary and Mary Magdalene as she hands them towels to clean up the blood from his scourging.

Pilate's wife is featured in the 2008 TV serial The Passion, played by Esther Hall, and in the 2013 miniseries The Bible, portrayed by Louise Delamere. Delamere reprised her role in 2014's Son of God.

Joanne Whalley portrayed Pilate's wife in the 2015 series A.D. The Bible Continues.

Sarah J. Bartholomew portrayed Pilate's wife "Claudia" in The Chosen from season 3 onward.

In the Brazilian telenovela Jesus, she was portrayed by Larissa Maciel.

In Dutch annual television passion play The Passion the character Claudia Procula was introduced in the 2023 edition, portrayed by actress and writer Nhung Dam. The character did not return in later editions.

== Cited works ==
- Bond, Helen K. (1998). Pontius Pilate in History and Interpretation. Cambridge University Press. ISBN 0-521-63114-9.
- Boxall, Ian (2018). "From the Magi to Pilate's Wife:David Brown, Tradition and the Reception of Matthew's Text". In Allen, Garrick V.; Brewer, Christopher R.; Kinlaw, Dennis F. III (eds.). The Moving Text: Interdisciplinary Perspectives on David Brown and Bible. London: SCM Press. pp. 17–36. ISBN 9780334055266.
- Carter, Warren (2003). Pontius Pilate: Portraits of a Roman Governor. Collegeville, Mn.: Liturgical Press. ISBN 0-8146-5113-5.
- Cornagliotti, Anna (2013). "Da procul a Procula: Antroponimi dei vangeli eterodossi". In Bremer Bruno, Donatella; Da Camilli, Davide; Porcelli, Bruno (eds.). Nomina: Studi di onomastica in onore di Maria Giovanni Arcamone. Pisa: Edizioni ETS. pp. 183–193. ISBN 9788846736383.
- Crowley, Roger W. (1985). "The So-Called "Ethiopic Book of the Cock": Part of an Apocryphal Passion Gospel, "The Homily and Teaching of Our Fathers the Holy Apostles"". The Journal of the Royal Asiatic Society of Great Britain and Ireland. 1 (1): 16–22. doi:10.1017/S0035869X00154905. JSTOR 25211766. S2CID 162813973.
- Demandt, Alexander (1999). Hände in Unschuld: Pontius Pilatus in der Geschichte. Cologne, Weimar, Vienna: Böhlau. ISBN 3-412-01799-X.
- Demandt, Alexander (2012). Pontius Pilatus. Munich: C. H. Beck. ISBN 9783406633621.
- Ehrman, Bart; Pleše, Zlatko (2011). The Apocryphal Gospels: Texts and Translations. Oxford University Press, USA. ISBN 978-0-19-973210-4.
- Fascher, Erich (1951). Das Weib des Pilatus (Matthäus 27,19); Die Auferweckung der Heiligen (Matthäus 27,51-53): Zwei Studien zur Geschichte der Schriftauslegung. Halle (Saale): Max Niemeyer Verlag.
- Grüll, Tibor (2010). "The Legendary Fate of Pontius Pilate". Classica et Mediaevalia. 61: 151–176.
- Hourihane, Colum (2009). Pontius Pilate, Anti-Semitism, and the Passion in Medieval Art. Princeton and Oxford: Princeton University Press. ISBN 9780691139562.
- Hourihane, Colum (2008). "She Who Is Not Named: Pilate's Wife In Medieval Art". In Kogman-Appel, Katrin (ed.). Between Judaism and Christianity Art: Historical Essays in Honor of Elisheva (Elisabeth) Revel-Neher. Leiden: Brill. pp. 215–239. doi:10.1163/ej.9789004171060.i-490.61. ISBN 9789004171060.
- Izydorczyk, Zbigniew, ed. (1997). The Medieval Gospel of Nicodemus: texts, intertexts, and contexts in Western Europe. Tempe, AZ: Medieval & Renaissance Texts and Studies. ISBN 0-86698-198-5.
- Kany, Roland (1995). "Die Frau des Pilatus und ihr Name: Ein Kapitel aus der Geschichte neutestamentlicher Wissenschaft". Zeitschrift für neutestamentliche Wissenschaft und die Kunde des Urchristentums. 88 (2): 104–110.
- Lémonon, Jean-Pierre (2007). Ponce Pilate. Paris: Atelier. ISBN 9782708239180.
- MacAdam, Henry I. (2001). "Quid Est Veritas? Pontius Pilate in Fact, Fiction, Film, and Fantasy". Irish Biblical Studies. 23 (1): 66–99.
- MacAdam, Henry I. (2017). "Quod scripsi, scripsi: Pontius Pilatus Redivivus". The Polish Journal of Biblical Research. 17 (1–2): 129–140.
- Maier, Paul L. (1968). Pontius Pilate. Garden City, NY: Doubleday. ISBN 9780825497216.
- Martin, Howard (1973). "The Legend of Pontius Pilate". Amsterdamer Beiträge zur älteren Germanistik. 4 (1): 95–118. doi:10.1163/18756719-005-01-90000007.
- Mork, Gordon R. (2005). "Dramatizing the Passion: From Oberammergau to Gibson". Shofar. 23 (3): 85–92. ISSN 0882-8539. JSTOR 42943843.
- Mouterde, René (1929). "Sarcophages de plomb trouvés en Syrie". Syria. 10 (3): 238–251. doi:10.3406/syria.1929.3389. JSTOR 195509.
- Ollivier, Marie-Joseph (1896). "Ponce Pilate et les Pontii". Revue Biblique. 5 (2 and 4): 247–254, 594–600. JSTOR 44100212.
- Piovanelli, Pierluigi (2003). "Exploring the Ethiopic "Book of the Cock", An Apocryphal Passion Gospel from Late Antiquity". The Harvard Theological Review. 96 (4): 427–454. doi:10.1017/S0017816003000518. JSTOR 4151866. S2CID 162634709.
- Smith, Jill Carington (1984). "Pilate's Wife". Antichthon. 18: 102–107. doi:10.1017/S0066477400003166. S2CID 148186487.
- Sticca, Sandro (1970). The Latin passion play: its origins and development. Albany, NY: State University of New York Press. ISBN 978-0-87395-045-9.
- Weeks, Andrew (2005). "Between God and Gibson: German Mystical and Romantic Sources of "The Passion of the Christ"". The German Quarterly. 78 (4): 421–440. ISSN 0016-8831. JSTOR 30039448.
- Wroe, Ann (1999). Pontius Pilate. New York: Random House. ISBN 0-375-50305-6.
