= Acts of Peter and Andrew =

3rd century New Testament apocrypha

The Acts of Peter and Andrew is a short work of New Testament apocrypha in the genre of apostolic Acts concerning adventures of the apostles Peter and Andrew. It is not to be confused with either the Acts of Andrew or the Acts of Peter. The work is a heroic romance, a work of entertainment and literature not particularly interested in espousing doctrine or theology.

The text consists of a series of tales of miracles, such as Andrew riding a cloud to where Peter is, and Peter literally putting a camel through the eye of a needle, turning the traditional metaphor ("it is easier for a camel to pass through the eye of the needle than for a rich man to enter the kingdom of heaven") on its head. The text appears to be a sequel to the Acts of Andrew and Matthias, as it seems to continue where the previous story left off, with the two leaving the city of man-eaters.
