= Pilate cycle =

Early Christian literature associated with Pontius Pilate

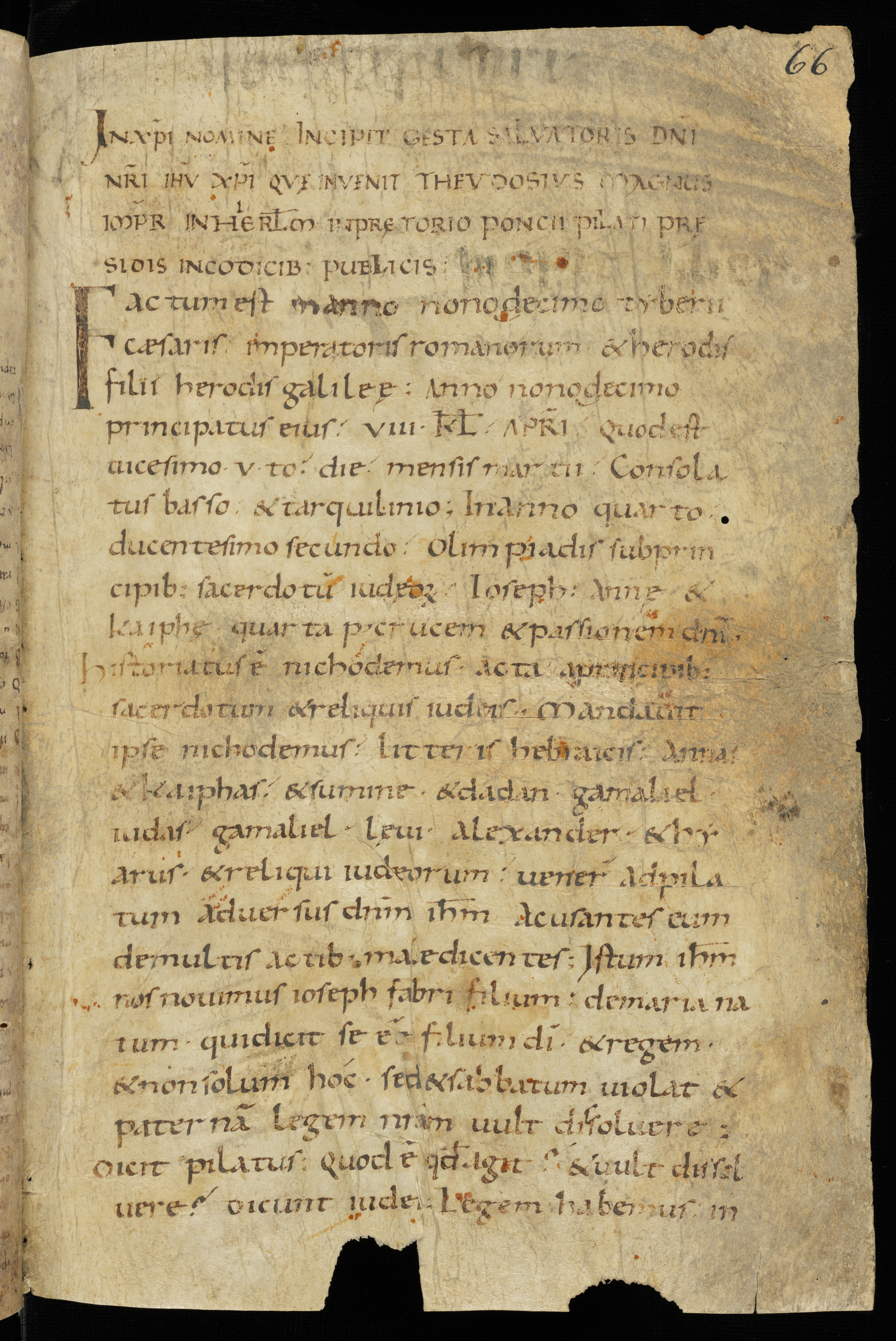
A 9th or 10th-century manuscript of the Gospel of Nicodemus, also known as the Acts of Pilate

The Pilate cycle is a group of various pieces of early Christian literature that either purport to be written by Pontius Pilate, or else otherwise closely describe his activities and the Passion of Jesus. Unlike the gospels, these later writings were not canonized in the New Testament, and were hence relegated to apocrypha. Some writings were obscure, with few ancient textual references known today; they survived merely through happenstance, and may not have been widely read by early Christians in the Roman Empire and Christians in the Middle Ages. Others were more popular. The most notable example is the Gospel of Nicodemus (or "Acts of Pilate"), which was influential in medieval and Renaissance Christianity.

The scholarly term Pilate cycle was not used by early Christians, who might have had access to one or two of these accounts at most. It is rather an umbrella designation used much later to collect the writings attributed to Pilate. None of the writings is considered by modern scholars to have been written by Pilate or his contemporaries.

== Background ==
Pontius Pilate was the prefect (governor) of the Roman province of Judea approximately from 26 to 36 AD. He presided over the execution of Jesus, likely due to accusations that Jesus had called himself "King of the Jews", leading Pilate to believe he was possibly fomenting a rebellion against the Herodian dynasty to bring about a "Kingdom of God". His activities are described in the Christian gospels that were canonized in the New Testament. The gospels are generally agreed to have been written between 70 and 110 AD, and provide a snapshot of Christian traditions about Pilate in the decades after Jesus's death.

Christians in later centuries hungered for more information than the gospels provided, however. Just as infancy gospels expanded the stories of young Jesus, various texts were produced that expanded the story of Pilate, Jesus's trial, and Jesus's execution. These Passion Gospels satisfied a natural curiosity and desire to know more about Jesus's death and its aftermath. In addition to expanding the gospel story, many of these accounts seem to have had an apologetic motive as well. They aimed to reassure Christians that something amazing had happened in Judea during the time of Jesus, and reliable neutral parties such as Pilate confirmed it.

Attitudes about Pilate varied, and affected the style of literature produced. Loosely speaking, eastern Christians revered Pilate, such as the Syrian, Coptic, and Ethiopian traditions; the Coptic tradition even deems him a saint. A version of this can be seen as early as the Gospel of John, which portrays Pilate more positively than the synoptic gospels. Western Christians were more skeptical of Pilate; during various periods of persecution by the Roman Empire, Pilate was identified as the first persecutor. Western attitudes softened later in an attempt to show that Christianity need not be feared and that good Romans such as Pilate had acknowledged that Jesus was not a threat to Roman rule, and that the Jews were the real problem. After Christianity became the state religion of the Roman Empire and after the fall of the Western Roman Empire, Western attitudes toward Pilate became more hostile again, as there was no longer a need to justify to pagan rulers that Christians were harmless and not criminals.

The first major scholarly collection of the Pilate cycle was by Constantin von Tischendorf, who published a series of collections of apocrypha in their oldest known versions, notably the Evangelia Apocrypha in 1853. Since Tischendorf's time, more works have been discovered, but much of the baseline terminology and assumptions were set by his pioneering work. More recent scholars to publish collections and translations include James Keith Elliott, Bart Ehrman, and Zlatko Pleše.

== Acts of Pilate ==
The Acta Pilati or Acts of Pilate is a Christian text that records Jesus's trial, execution, and resurrection and expands upon the details given from the gospels. It is by far the most popular and well-read of Pilate-related apocrypha, being compiled in the Gospel of Nicodemus (Evangelium Nicodemi) in the 9th century, which was a popular work among medieval European Christians. There are two main versions, usually referred to as A and B. It is unknown precisely when a form similar to the versions that survive was written. Justin Martyr makes a reference to an Acts of Pilate as early as 160 AD, although the version he knew may have been much different than later traditions, or else Justin may have simply assumed that some record must have existed. Scholars estimate that the versions that survive may have been finalized as late as the 5th or 6th centuries, although earlier dates from the 2nd–4th centuries are possible as well; in particular, a compelling hypothesis is that the Acts were first written in the early 4th century as a counterattack to a rival pagan Acts of Pilate. The work was originally written in Greek, although the text implausibly claims to be translated from a Hebrew original. The authors appear to be familiar with all four of the canonical gospels, and include some material from each. While many of the other parts of the Pilate cycle survive on just a few ancient records, the Acts of Pilate was very popular; over 500 ancient manuscripts survive in a variety of languages and versions, indicating it was translated, copied, and modified many times across Christendom. It proved especially popular in Western Christianity, with many surviving copies of the Latin translation.

The versions identifying themselves as the Gospel of Nicodemus include a prologue where an author identifying himself as Ananias, a bodyguard of Pilate, claims to be translating a Hebrew work by Nicodemus. The main Acts of Pilates then proceeds to describe Jesus's trial; in it, Pilate is portrayed positively, as someone who recognizes Jesus's greater authority as king. The Jewish leaders accuse Jesus of being a sorcerer. Jesus is brought in to be questioned, and the Roman standards (aquila) bow down and worship him. Pilate finds nothing to charge Jesus with; various witnesses attest to Jesus's miracles of healing. Pilate says he is innocent of the matter, while the Jews quote the Gospel of Matthew's claim that they said "his blood be upon us and our children," a phrase repeated three times in the work. At Jesus's execution, the day turning to night is written off by the Jews as a natural eclipse of the sun. Jesus's resurrection proceeds similar to a harmonized account that attempts to combine all the gospel versions. Nicodemus searches for the resurrected Jesus, but instead finds only Joseph of Arimathea. Joseph, a rabbi named Levi, and other witnesses testify to Jesus's resurrection and divine nature.

The B version includes various content not directly related to Pilate. It includes chapters on the Harrowing of Hell, which describes exactly what happened while Jesus was dead after his execution. In it, a dead John the Baptist preaches in Hades (the realm) to other dead figures of the Jewish scriptures including Adam and Seth, the patriarchs, and the prophets, and tells of Jesus's coming. Satan is misled into believing that Jesus is a mere human, and encourages Hades (the deity) to trap him. However, Jesus instead smashes the gates of Hades with his authority, freeing and saving the dead. Satan is bound by angels and given over to Hades in death to await the Second Coming of Jesus. Some scholars suggest that the Harrowing of Hell section may have originally been a separate document written in perhaps the 5th or 6th centuries. A later editor merged the story with the Acts of Pilate, creating the longer B version.

== Anaphora Pilati ==
The Anaphora Pilati or Report of Pontius Pilate is a report purportedly written by Pilate to Emperor Tiberius describing Jesus's execution and its aftermath. Its date of authorship is unknown. Tertullian references a report Pilate wrote to Emperor Tiberius in his Apology, written around 197 AD; however he provides no details, so he may well have been referring to a different text. The text is estimated to more likely originate from the late 4th century or the 5th century. The oldest versions that survive are Greek versions from the 6th century, and Arabic and Karshuni versions from the 10th and 13th century.

The Anaphora Pilati is largely an anti-Jewish work. The miracles of Jesus are plain and obvious to Pilate as more powerful than any the Roman gods provide, yet the Jews blindly reject Jesus and demand his punishment, despite being unable to convict him of a single crime. Pilate only allows the execution to proceed to prevent a rebellion. After Jesus's death, a supernatural light comes down on Jerusalem at the third hour of the night. An earthquake opens the mountains, and the dead pour out from Hades. (Note: Presumably a reference to Matthew 27:52.) Jews who had dared speak against Jesus are swallowed by chasms from the earthquake, not even leaving bodies. All of the synagogues in Jerusalem are destroyed except one.

== Letter of Herod to Pilate ==
The Letter of Herod to Pilate is a letter purportedly from Herod Antipas, Tetrarch of Galilee, to Pilate. Greek and Syriac versions exist, although Greek is considered the original language of the letter. A Syriac document from the 5th or 6th century is the oldest version available today, although it likely originates from the late 4th century. Despite the title, it is not part of a correspondence with the Letter of Pilate to Herod; it is a separate work, although the two works are included together in manuscripts. Notably, Longinus has a completely different fate in this letter than in the Letter of Pilate to Herod.

In the Letter of Herod to Pilate, Herod has belatedly realized his evil deeds (such as cutting off John the Baptist's head), and writes to Pilate of the coming just punishment to him and the Jews. Herod's daughter Herodia is bizarrely decapitated after her mother grabs her head trying to save her from a sudden flood of the river. His son Lesbonaks is dying of a wasting disease. His wife is going blind, and he is being afflicted by worms. (Note: This is possibly a reference to Acts 12, wherein Herod Agrippa, Antipas's brother, is eaten by worms.) Herod affirms that God has handed over the Kingdom to gentiles like Pilate, that death was coming to the priests of Judaism, and that Jews like him had failed to abide by God's law. He requests that Pilate bury him and his family after their deaths, rather than the already damned Jewish priests. Herod adds that Longinus, who stabbed Jesus with his spear, had also suffered lopsided punishment: he was being eternally devoured by a lion. His body is restored every dawn, and the lion shreds his body each night, until the second coming of Christ (somewhat similar to the punishment of Prometheus). The letter concludes with writing that Nicodemus and Joseph of Arimathea had set down the record of this letter.

== Letter of Pilate to Claudius ==
The Letter of Pilate to Claudius is a document purportedly written by Pilate to Emperor Claudius and written in Greek. It is potentially one of the oldest pieces of Pilate literature, dating from some point between the end of the 2nd century AD and the 5th century. The letter was later incorporated into the Acts of Peter and Paul, a 5th-century work. It evinces a positive attitude toward Pilate.

The account is largely a contradiction of the stolen body hypothesis that suggests Jesus's body was stolen, rather than being resurrected. Pilate first affirms that Jesus performed amazing miracles during his term as governor. Pilate was convinced to hand him over to the Jews because the chief priests said he was a sorcerer who was violating Jewish law. The author then shows familiarity with the Gospel of Matthew and repeats the story from there that Pilate had sent soldiers to watch the tomb, Jesus had risen from the dead in the presence of the soldiers, and the chief priests of the Jews had paid off the soldiers in an attempt to spread lies that Jesus's disciples had stolen the body instead. In the Letter of Pilate to Claudius, Pilate testifies that the soldiers instead informed him of the bribe and the truth of the matter, that the resurrection was real. He then decided to write up this report so that Claudius would not believe the lies of the Jews.

Historically, being a letter to Claudius is rather strange, as Claudius began his reign only in AD 41, some years after both Jesus's death and Pilate's term as prefect. One possibility is that the author, writing centuries later, was misinformed about the correct timeframes of the succession of Roman emperors. Another is that the letter was originally to Tiberius, but when it was incorporated into the Acts of Peter and Paul, its recipient was updated to fit better into that story. In the Acts, the apostle Simon Peter and the deceiver Simon Magus appear before Emperor Nero. When Nero hears about Christ, he asks how he can learn more about him. Peter suggests retrieving Pilate's letter to the previous emperor (Claudius), and it is read aloud.

The account is less anti-Jewish than some of the works attributed to Pilate that see him positively; in it, "all the people of the Jews called him [Jesus] Son of God", and it is the chief priests who are evil and bent on discrediting Jesus out of envy.

== Letter of Pilate to Herod ==
The Letter of Pilate to Herod is a work purportedly written by Pontius Pilate to Herod Antipas, Tetrarch of Galilee. Greek and Syriac versions exist, although Greek is considered the original language of the letter. A Syriac document from the 5th or 6th century is the oldest version available to us today, however, and is seemingly incomplete in parts. The work is hypothesized to have originally been written in the 3rd or 4th century. It bears a number of similarities to the Paradosis Pilati, notably in its respect to Pilate and his wife converting. Unlike the Paradosis Pilati, it is not overtly anti-Jewish in its message. Despite the title, it is not part of a correspondence with the Letter of Herod to Pilate; it is a separate work, although the two letters would later be included in the same manuscripts.

In The Letter of Pilate to Herod, Pilate expresses remorse over executing Jesus. His messengers sent to Galilee find the resurrected Jesus and confirm his divine power. He, his wife Procla, and the centurion Longinus all convert to Christianity, and affirm Christian teachings. Pilate describes being personally blessed by a vision of the Lord.

== Letter of Pilate to Tiberius ==
The Letter of Pilate to Tiberius is a short letter that Pilate purportedly wrote to Emperor Tiberius. It is a comparatively late text, perhaps as late as the Renaissance. It was originally written in Latin.

The depiction of Pilate is quite positive; Pilate describes Jesus as the most pious person who ever existed, and explains himself as having to execute him only because he feared an uprising of the Jews against Rome had he declined.

== Letter of Tiberius to Pilate ==
The Letter of Tiberius to Pilate is a Greek text purportedly from Emperor Tiberius to Pilate. Its date of authorship is unknown. It is hypothesized to be from comparatively late during medieval Christianity, around the 11th century at the earliest. Despite being written in Greek, it evinces later Western attitudes toward Pilate, considering him a criminal. The writer may have been familiar with the Acts of Pilate. While the letter alludes to an earlier letter from Pilate to Tiberius, this earlier letter does not appear to be the Anaphora Pilati, the Renaissance Letter of Pilate to Tiberius above, or any other extant similar work; it is unknown if this other letter was a mere rhetorical flourish, or a lost work.

According to the work, the letter is sent by Tiberius and 2,000 Roman soldiers and a courier named Rahab. Tiberius is enraged at Pilate's unjust sentence to Jesus, of whom Tiberius has received reports of his amazing deeds of healing. Pilate, Herod Archelaus, Philip, Annas, Caiaphas, and the Jewish leaders are to be arrested and brought to Rome. The soldiers are also to slay all Jewish males for the crime of the execution of Jesus and defile the Jewish women. The letter continues on to describe their later fates: the Jewish leaders suffer horrific deaths, being beheaded, impaled, crucified, and squeezed to death. The emperor personally kills Pilate as part of a divinely guided hunting accident; Tiberius was attempting to shoot a hind with his bow, but the arrow instead went into the window of Pilate's prison and killed him.

== Mors Pilati ==
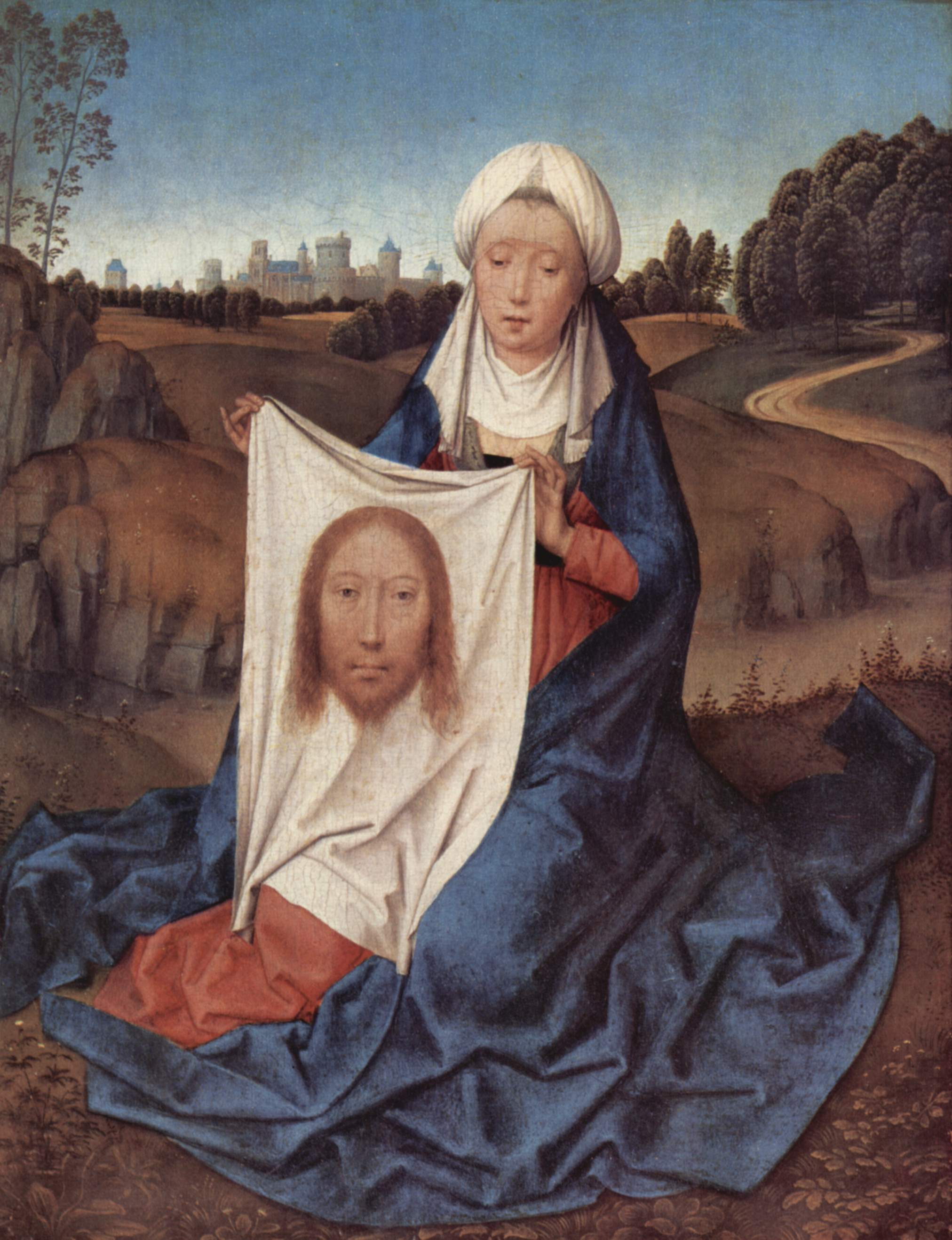
The Cura sanitatis Tiberii legend appears in many Pilate-related works; Saint Veronica and her cloth with the image of Jesus heals Emperor Tiberius. Painting by Hans Memling, about 1470.

The Mors Pilati or The Death of Pilate Who Condemned Jesus is a late medieval work written in Latin. Similar to the Letter of Tiberius to Pilate, it has a hostile attitude toward Pilate. It is an anonymous work that does not identify its author. While the modern form is from the 14th century, a version appears in the Golden Legend of the 1250s; this work may have been inspired by an excerpt from a work called the Historia Apocrypha from the 11th and 12th centuries, which itself might have been inspired by the Vindicta Salvatoris of the 8th and 9th centuries.

In The Death of Pilate, Emperor Tiberius is ill. He sends his emissary Volusian to seek out the famous healer Jesus of Nazareth, but Volusian is too late; Pilate has already executed him. Volusian instead finds Saint Veronica, and takes both Veronica and Pilate back to Rome. Veronica uses a handkerchief with Jesus's image imprinted on it to heal Tiberius instead. Tiberius brings Pilate before him for judgment, but is stalled because Pilate is wearing part of Jesus's tunic that had been divided the day of his execution, and the Emperor finds himself unable to act hostilely against someone wearing it. After a Christian strips Pilate of his scrounged holy tunic, Tiberius orders Pilate's execution. Pilate stabs himself with a dagger upon hearing the news. His dead body is then moved several times, as malignant spirits rejoice and stir up trouble around wherever his body lies, and the terrified locals move the body to stop the thunder, hail, windstorms, and so on. His body finally rests in a lake near Losania (Lausanne) in the mountains of the Alps, which is isolated enough to trouble fewer people (presumably either Lake Lucerne or Lake Leman).

== Narrative of Joseph of Arimathea ==
The Narrative of Joseph of Arimathea is a medieval legend written in Greek, purportedly by Joseph of Arimathea, the man who requested Jesus's body to bury it. It chronicles the passion of Jesus as well as some of Jesus's activities with Joseph after his resurrection. While Pilate is a minor player, it is usually included in the Pilate cycle due to its emphasis on Jesus's trial and execution. The date it is written is unknown; the earliest manuscripts surviving are from the 12th century. The author of the work seems to be familiar with the letters of Herod to Pilate and the Acts of Pilate (Gospel of Nicodemus), so any time after the Acts of Pilate was written (approximately the 5th century) to the 12th century is possible for the date of the composition of the work. The work has an anti-Jewish agenda and betrays colossal ignorance of Jewish customs. The author has Joseph condemn the "murderous Jews who wage war against God", that Nicodemus, the sole "good" Jew, held to the truth more than the entire multitude of the Jews, and directly expresses his hope at the conclusion that "all ... [will] no longer serve the law of Moses."

The work goes into some detail on the thieves who were crucified with Jesus. Gestas, the evil thief, is a psychotic murderer and highwayman who drinks the blood of babies. Demas, the good thief, is a Galilean innkeeper and a proto-Robin Hood; he steals from the rich and treats the poor well. Demas robs the Temple of Jerusalem and steals Jewish law itself. While doing so, he humiliates the daughter of evil Chief Priest Caiaphas, Sara, by stealing her clothes, and steals Solomon's treasure. The theft of the law sends the Jews into a frenzy. Judas is bribed by the Jews for thirty pieces of gold to gain evidence (rather than the usual silver), and accuses Jesus of the crime Demas committed. Jesus is arrested for the theft of the law. Jesus does not respond to the charges, as he is innocent. The Jews become unruly and want to burn Sara at the stake, since without the Law they cannot celebrate Passover. Sara suggests instead that if the Jews collectively destroy Jesus, this will cause the law to be found. After Judas's betrayal with a kiss, Jesus is arrested again and handed over to Caiaphas and the chief priests.

On the cross, Jesus discusses matters with the two thieves. Gestas says if he had known Jesus was a king, he would have tried to kill him as well, and insults Jesus as a wild beast. Demas, sensing Jesus's power, asks for forgiveness. Jesus, from the cross, writes the angels that Demas should enter paradise. He also decrees that the children of Abraham, Isaac, Jacob, and Moses (that is, the Jews) be cast into hell. Joseph requests Jesus's body and buries it, but is then imprisoned by the Jews who violate their own law by imprisoning him on the Sabbath. A resurrected Jesus and Demas arrive at the prison and annihilate it with a great light, freeing Joseph. The three depart for Galilee, where they meet John the Apostle, who is amazed at the robber Demas's new ineffable and beatific appearance.

== Paradosis Pilati ==
The Paradosis Pilati or The Handing Over of Pilate is an account of Pilate being brought to Rome for judgment before Emperor Tiberius for his execution of Jesus. It is written in Greek. The earliest surviving manuscripts are from the 12th century, but the work is hypothesized to be from the 4th or 5th century, similar to the Anaphora Pilati. The account may have been one of the earliest to name Pontius Pilate's wife as "Procla". It also describes Procla as being an earlier convert to Christianity than Pilate himself. Its very high regard for Pilate suggests an origin in Eastern Christianity.

The more famous Acts of Pilate was possibly influenced by the Paradosis Pilati, or the same traditions that inspired it. Some scholars suggest that the Paradosis Pilati may have been a sequel of sorts to the Anaphora Pilati, describing Tiberius's response; however, as the Paradosis Pilati does not describe an author, other scholars such as Ehrman and Plese reject this possibility, although suggest that the author may well have been familiar with the Anaphora Pilati.

In The Handing Over of Pilate, Tiberius orders Pilate brought to him as a prisoner, somehow intuiting that the darkness that covered the world at Jesus's execution was his fault. At trial, Pilate deflects and says that the Jewish leaders as well as the "entire multitude of the Jews" were the ones truly at fault. Tiberius suggests that Pilate should have sent Jesus to Rome for his safety. At the speaking of Jesus's name, all the emblems and statues of the Roman gods turn to dust. After he is pressed again, Pilate again blames the Jews for his act. Tiberius authorizes a decree to the Roman governor to enslave and disperse the inhabitants of Judea, and lay the nation waste. The governor, Licianus, does so. (Note: This is ahistorical; the First Jewish–Roman War would not occur until forty years later.) Still aghast at the death of Jesus, the emperor orders Pilate beheaded. Pilate prays and again blames the Jews. A voice from heaven responds and says that all the races and families of the gentiles will bless Pilate because the fulfillment of the ancient prophecies of Jesus happened under him. Pilate will personally appear as a witness at the Second Coming and of the judging of unbelievers. After Pilate is beheaded, an angel personally brings his head to heaven. His wife dies with joy upon seeing his holy reward, and their two bodies are buried together.

== Vindicta Salvatoris ==
The Vindicta Salvatoris or The Vengeance of the Savior is a medieval legend written in Latin. It is an anonymous work that does not identify its author. The oldest text found is the Saint-Omer manuscript of the 9th century, although scholars have argued the text likely originates from the 8th century. An Anglo-Saxon language (Old English) version exists from the 11th century as well that was used as an ancient source before the Saint-Omer version was discovered; Latin is still believed to be the original language of composition, with the Anglo-Saxon version a translation. Despite Pilate only featuring in a minor role, it is generally grouped with other works of the Pilate cycle, due to it including the legend of Veronica and Tiberius that features in other Pilate literature.

The work is deeply anti-Jewish, and is a revenge fantasy wherein the Jews suffer horrifically for their collective crime of killing the Messiah. Pilate is portrayed negatively as in the Western tradition, and has a terrible fate befall him as vengeance as well. The author of the work is quite ignorant of the geography of the province of Judea and the Roman Empire of the era. For example, the work writes that Titus was a client ruler of "Libiae" (rather than a Roman Emperor who would reign decades later); includes Herod the Great, Tiberius, Titus, and Vespasian as contemporaries (their lives and reigns were separated by decades); and incorrectly believes Auster to be the north wind (it is the southern wind). "Libiae" may mean either Libya (Roman North Africa) or Albi (in Gallia Aquitania), neither of which would be described as north of Judea. These errors suggest the late date of composition in a place far removed from the Eastern Mediterranean. The work is also an expansion of the Cura sanitatis Tiberii legend from the 6th and 7th centuries, wherein Saint Veronica cures Tiberius. The story possibly builds on traditions from the Aquitaine region, as the story associates Titus with Burdigala (Roman-era Bourdeaux) in what may be a nod toward including the author's readers in the story.

In The Vengeance of the Savior, Nathan, an Ishmaelite (Arab), leaves Judea and travels the Empire to collect a tribute for Emperor Tiberius. Winds blow him off-course north to the city of Burdigala, where the ruler Tyrus has cancer and a mangled face. There, Nathan tells Tyrus of Jesus's miracles, trial, execution, saving of the human race from hell, and resurrection. Tyrus converts to Christianity on the spot. He swears that if he had known earlier, he would have avenged his death, killed Jesus's enemies, and hung their bodies from a dry tree. This vow of vengeance immediately cures Tyrus's cancer and restores his face. After he is baptized by Nathan, Tyrus changes his name to Titus. Titus and Vespasian leave Burdigala with an army and besiege Jerusalem for seven years. Amid the famine from the long siege, King Herod the Great commits suicide. Many of the Jews, following Herod's lead, commit mass suicide. The Jews agree that the Holy Land is no longer theirs, but that Christ has taken it from them to give to the Romans. After the city falls, various gory fates befall the remaining Jews: some are quartered into four pieces (as Jesus's clothing had been divided); some are speared; some are stoned; some are hanged; and the remaining are enslaved and sold at a rate of 30 Jews for one silver piece, in reference to the thirty pieces of silver paid to Judas.

After this, the Emperor's emissary Volosianus comes to Jerusalem to investigate stories of Jesus. He interrogates Joseph of Arimathea, Nicodemus, Simeon, and Pontius Pilate. Angered at what he has learned, Volosianus has Pilate thrown in an iron cage for killing the perfect man, and orders his punishment by the foulest death. Herod's son Archelaus is stoned to death. Volosianus also finds Saint Veronica, and takes her portrait of Jesus from her to bring back to Tiberius. Veronica insists on going on the boat with him so that she does not lose her image of Jesus. At court, Volosianus describes how the guilty Jews have been punished, and how Jews should be slaughtered and their names erased from the Earth. Veronica's portrait heals Emperor Tiberius of his leprosy, and Tiberius and his household are baptized as Christians.

== Other apocryphal works with notable Pilate content ==
The Gospel of Peter is an apocryphal gospel that was not canonized by the early Church after accusations that it promoted docetism. It only exists in fragmentary form from a single surviving copy discovered in Egypt in 1886. One notable facet is that Jewish King Herod Antipas is given the responsibility for Jesus's execution; Pilate washes his hands of the matter, but Herod and the Jewish judges refuse to do so. This is similar to how various works in the Pilate cycle seek to adjust blame for Jesus's death from Pilate to the Jews.

The "Gospel of Gamaliel" is a hypothetical book speculated to exist by some scholars. While no ancient sources directly refer to such a gospel, Paulin Ladeuze and Carl Anton Baumstark first proposed that such a book existed in 1906. Scholars who believe such a book once existed have reconstructed it from a homily, the "Lament of Mary" (Laha Maryam) by a bishop named Cyriacus. They believe Laha Maryam extensively quotes the Gospel of Gamaliel; the Lament includes a section that leads with "I, Gamaliel" which caused the speculation that these sections were actually quoting an existing gospel. Other scholars believe that such inference is unwarranted, and these sections are simply written by Cyriacus from the perspective of Gamaliel. Reasonably complete manuscripts of Laha Maryam exist in both Ethiopian and Karshuni (Arabic). Regardless of whether Laha Maryam is quoting a lost gospel or is simply building on extant legends, it keeps to the Coptic and Ethiopian traditions in painting Pilate in an extremely positive light. The speculated book describes Good Friday and its aftermath, and is purportedly written by Gamaliel the Elder, a Rabbi mentioned in the book of Acts and the Mishnah. Pilate believes in Jesus; he interrogates the soldiers at Jesus's tomb and uncovers the truth; he witnesses Jesus's remaining grave-clothes at the empty tomb causing miracles of healing; and he trades letters with King Herod on the matter.

== Lost works ==
=== Acts of Pilate (pagan) ===
Eusebius, in his work Church History, refers to a pagan Acts of Pilate that was promoted during the reign of Emperor Maximinus Daza (310–313 AD), but it is a lost work that was not preserved. The document was distributed to towns and cities to be read as part of a government campaign against Christianity. Eusebius denounces it as a forgery, due to a chronological inconsistency between it and the timeline described in Josephus's histories; its claimed date was before Pilate was appointed governor. Eusebius writes it was "full of every kind of blasphemy against Christ"; presumably, it recorded that Jesus was a common criminal who had no special authority or power. As it was part of a propaganda campaign aimed at common people, it was likely short and simple: a list of charges against Jesus and an account of his trial, perhaps.

It is possible that the Christian Acts of Pilate were written precisely as a counter to the pagan Acts of Pilate: a Christian author, angry at the pagan forgery, decided to record what they believed to have really happened and produce a competing Acts of Pilate.

== See also ==
- Cura sanitatis Tiberii, a Latin work on Saint Veronica's healing of Emperor Tiberius that often features in Pilate literature
