= Acts of Andrew and Bartholomew =

5th-century Nestorian Christian text

The Acts of Andrew and Bartholomew is a 5th-century Nestorian text originally written in Koine Greek which is one of many apocryphal acts of the apostles. The work was influential on later Christian hagiographies of Saint Mercurius and Saint Christopher, as well as several medieval Islamic traditions.

== Published editions ==
=== English ===
- Lewis, Agnes Smith (1904). The Mythological Acts of the Apostles. Horae semiticae. C.J. Clay. p. 11ff.
- Budge, Ernest Alfred Wallis (1901). "The acts of saints Andrew and Bartholomew among the Parthians". The contendings of the Apostles: Being the histories of the lives and martyrdoms and deaths of the twelve apostles and evangelists: The Ethiopic texts now first edited from manuscripts in the British Museum, with an English translation. Vol. 2. p. 183ff. Translated from Ethiopic.

=== Ethiopic ===
- Budge, Ernest Alfred Wallis (1899). The contendings of the Apostles: Being the histories of the lives and martyrdoms and deaths of the twelve apostles and evangelists: The Ethiopic texts now first edited from manuscripts in the British Museum, with an English translation (in Geez). Vol. 1. pp. 156–183.

== See also ==
- Cynocephaly
- Acts of Andrew
