= Santa Maria in Palmis =

Small church southeast of Rome, Italy

- Chiesa di Santa Maria delle Piante (in Italian); Sanctae Mariae in Palmis (in Latin)
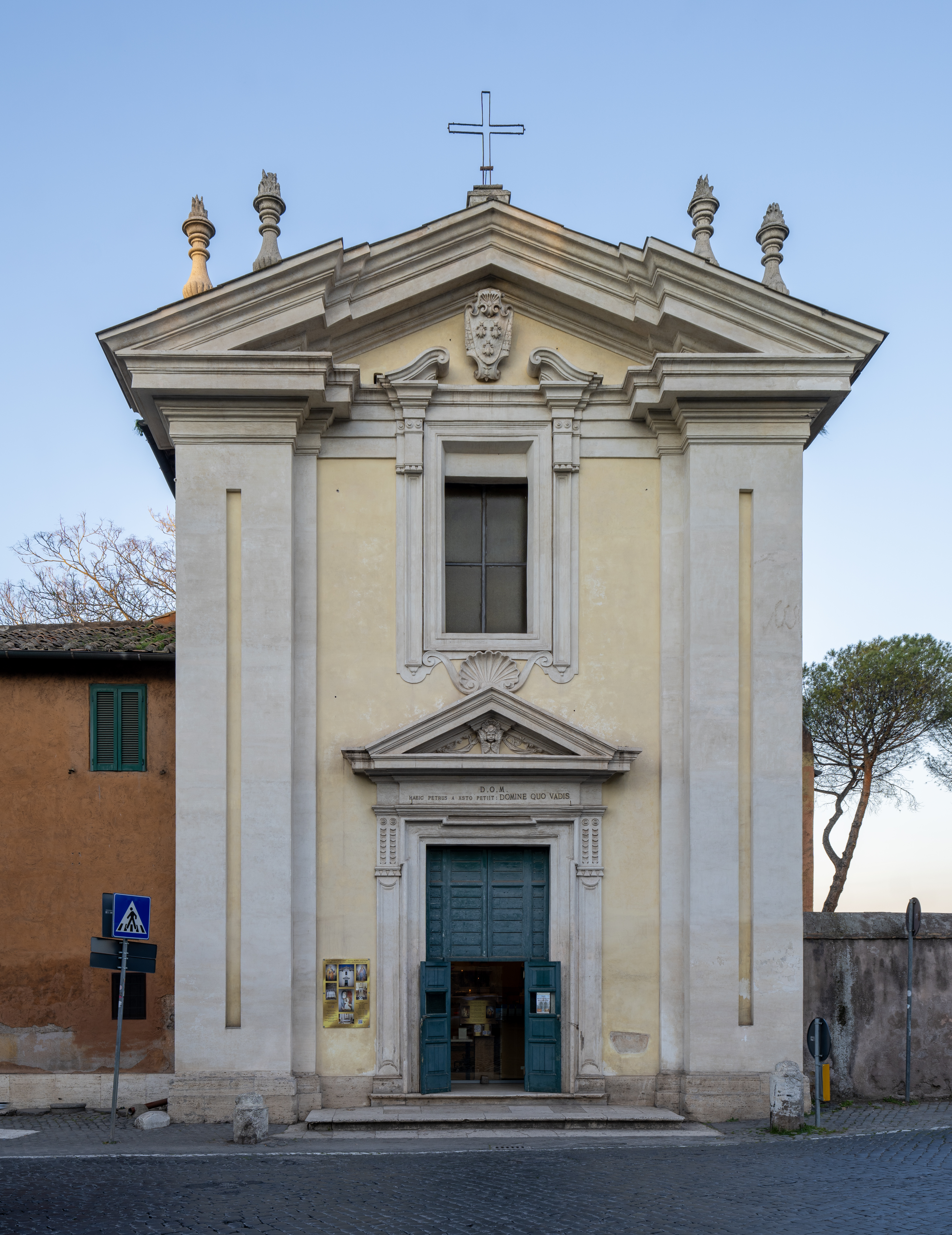
- The facade of the church

- Location within Rome

Religion
- Affiliation: Roman Catholic
- Ecclesiastical or organisational status: Parish church
- Leadership: Marian Babula, CSMA

Location
- Location: Via Appia Antica, 51; Rome, Italy
- Coordinates: 41°51′59.4″N 12°30′13.4″E

Architecture
- Type: Church
- Completed: 1637

Specifications
- Direction of façade: Southwest
- Length: 17 meters (56 ft)
- Width: 11 meters (36 ft)

Website
- vicariatusurbis.org

Santa Maria in Palmis (Italian: Chiesa di Santa Maria delle Piante; Latin: Sanctae Mariae in Palmis), also known as Chiesa del Domine Quo Vadis, is a small church southeast of Rome. It is located about some 800 m from Porta San Sebastiano, where the Via Ardeatina branches off the Appian Way, on the site where, according to the apocryphal Acts of Peter, Saint Peter met the risen Christ while Peter was fleeing persecution in Rome. According to the tradition, Peter asked him, "Lord, where are you going?" (Latin: Domine, quo vadis?). Christ answered, "I am going to Rome to be crucified again" (Latin: Eo Romam iterum crucifigi).

== History ==
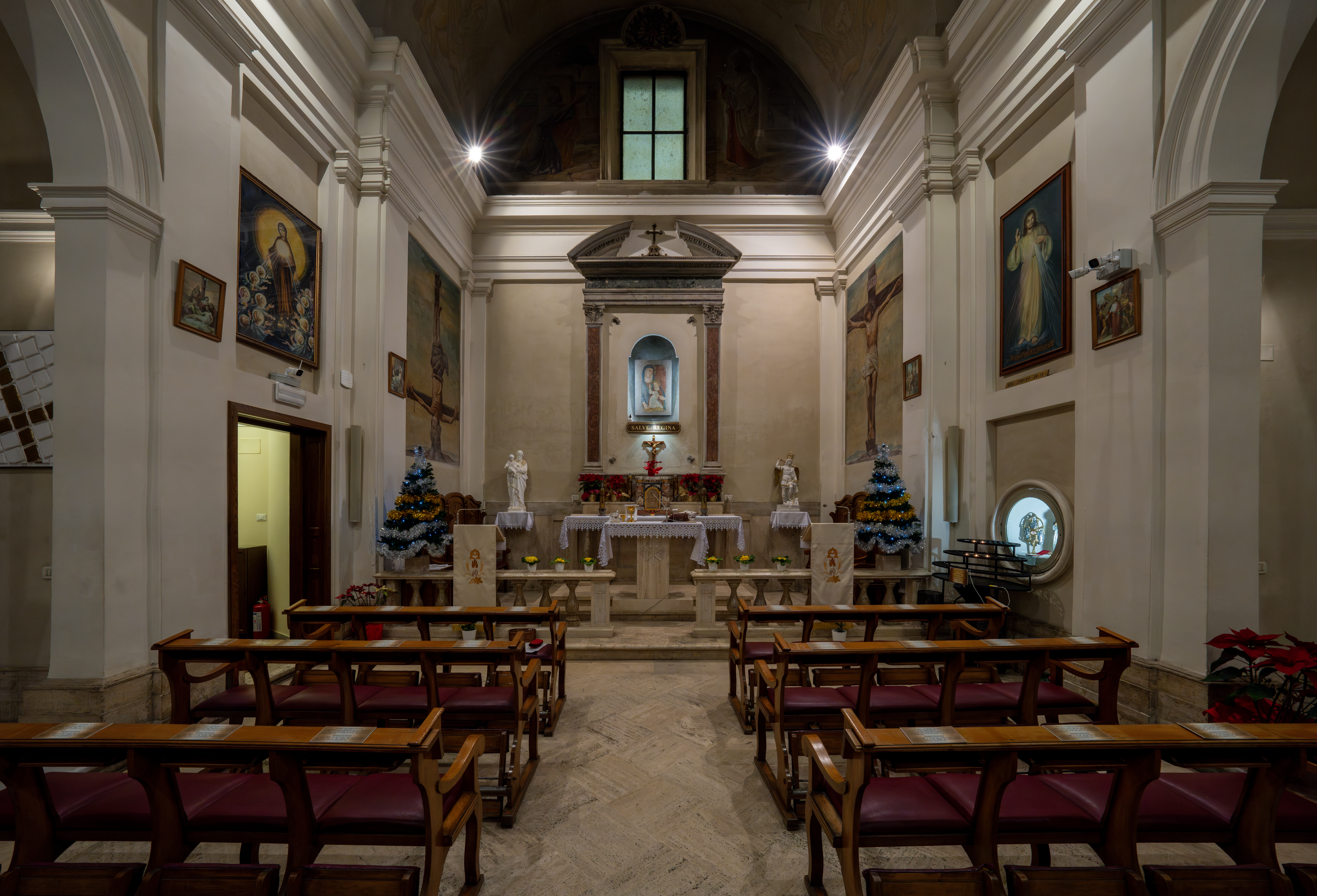
The interior

There has been a sanctuary on the spot since the ninth century, but the current church is from 1637. The current façade was added in the 17th century.

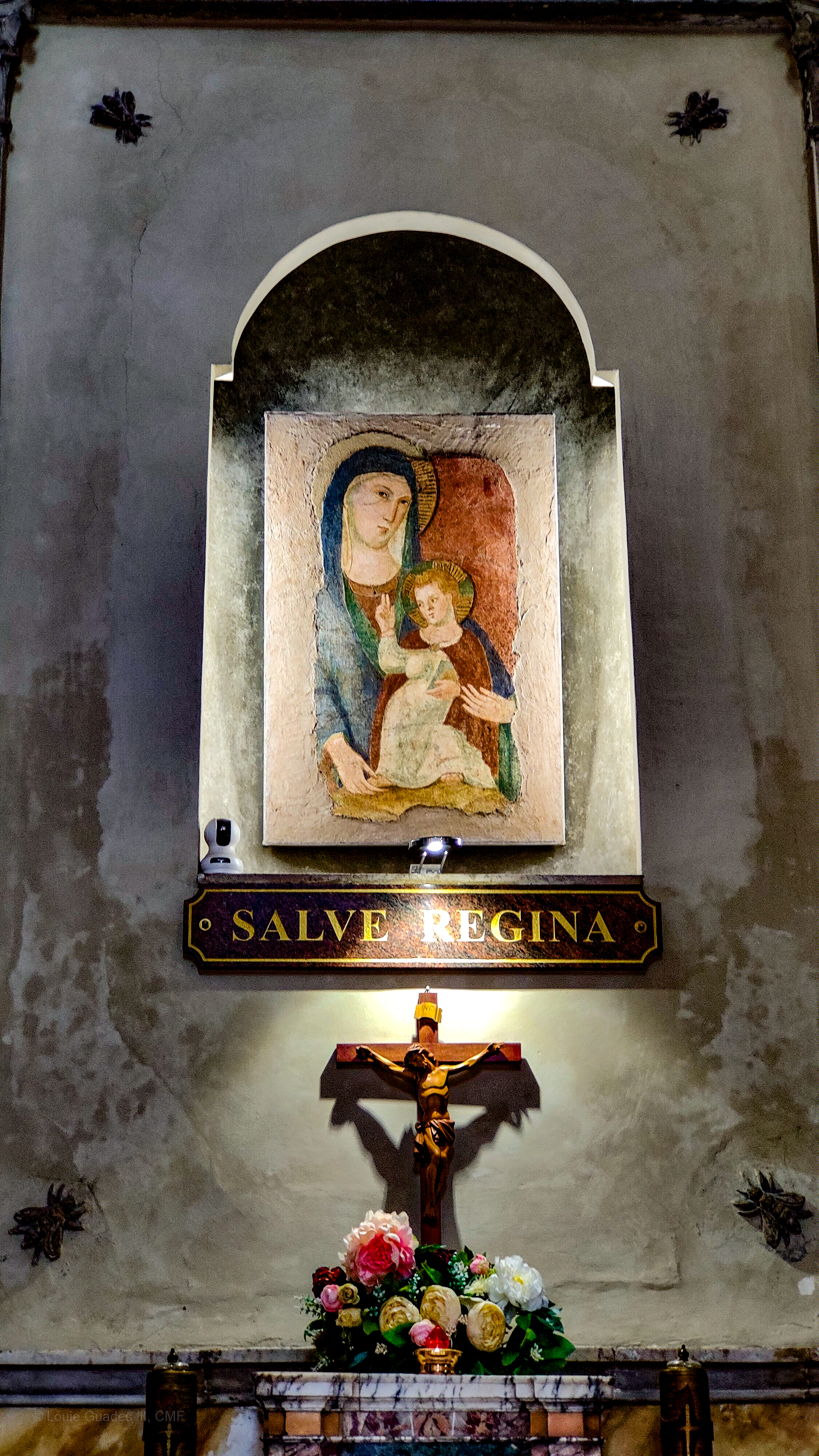
The venerated icon of Madonna delle Piante

It has been supposed that the sanctuary might have been even more ancient, perhaps a Christian adaptation of an already existing temple: the church is in fact located in front of the sacred campus dedicated to Rediculus, the Roman "God of the Return". This campus hosted a sanctuary for the cult of the deity that received devotion by travellers before their departure, especially those going to face long and dangerous journeys to far-off places like Egypt, Greece or the East. Those travellers upon their safe return also stopped to thank the god for the happy outcome of their journey.

The presence of the Apostle Peter in this area, where he is supposed to have lived, appears to be confirmed in an epigraph in the Catacombs of Saint Sebastian that reads Domus Petri (English: House of Peter). An epigram by Pope Damasus I (366–384) in honor of Peter and Paul reads: "You that are looking for the names of Peter and Paul, you must know that the saints have lived here."

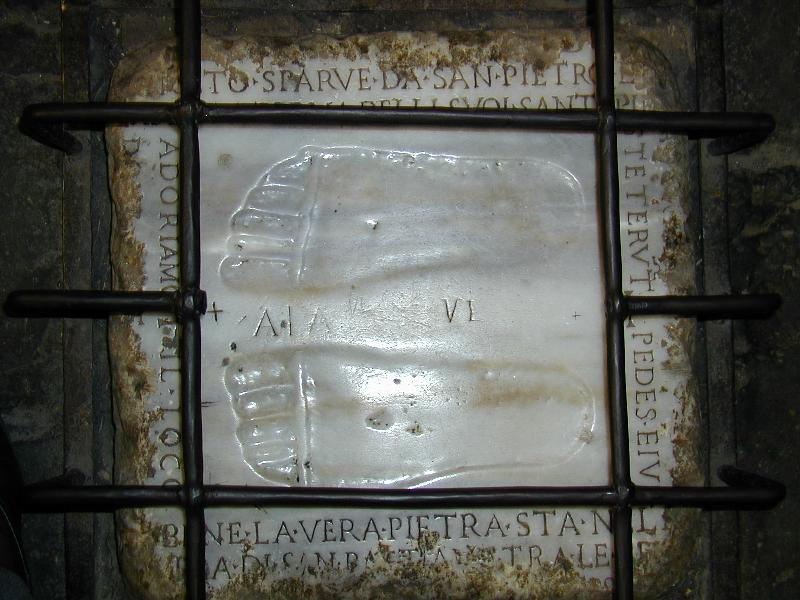
Rome, via Appia Antica, Quo vadis Church: footprints believed to be those of St Peter

The two footprints on a marble slab at the center of the church — nowadays a copy of the original, which is kept in the nearby Basilica of San Sebastiano fuori le mura — are popularly believed to be a miraculous sign left by Jesus. The official name of the church alludes to these footprints: palmis refers to the soles of Jesus' feet.

An inscription above the front door on the church's façade formerly read "Stop your walking, traveller, and enter this sacred temple in which you will find the footprint of our Lord Jesus Christ when He met with St. Peter who escaped from the prison. An alms for the wax and the oil is recommended in order to free some spirits from Purgatory." Pope Gregory XVI found the advertising tone of this inscription so inappropriate that he ordered its removal in 1845.

There is also a modern column with a bust of Henryk Sienkiewicz, the Polish author of the famous historical fiction novel Quo Vadis: A Narrative of the Time of Nero (1896). It is said that Sienkiewicz was inspired to write his novel while sitting in this church.

The church is currently administered by priests of the Congregation of Saint Michael the Archangel.

== See also ==
- Quo vadis
- Saint Peter's tomb
