= Quo vadis? =

Latin phrase

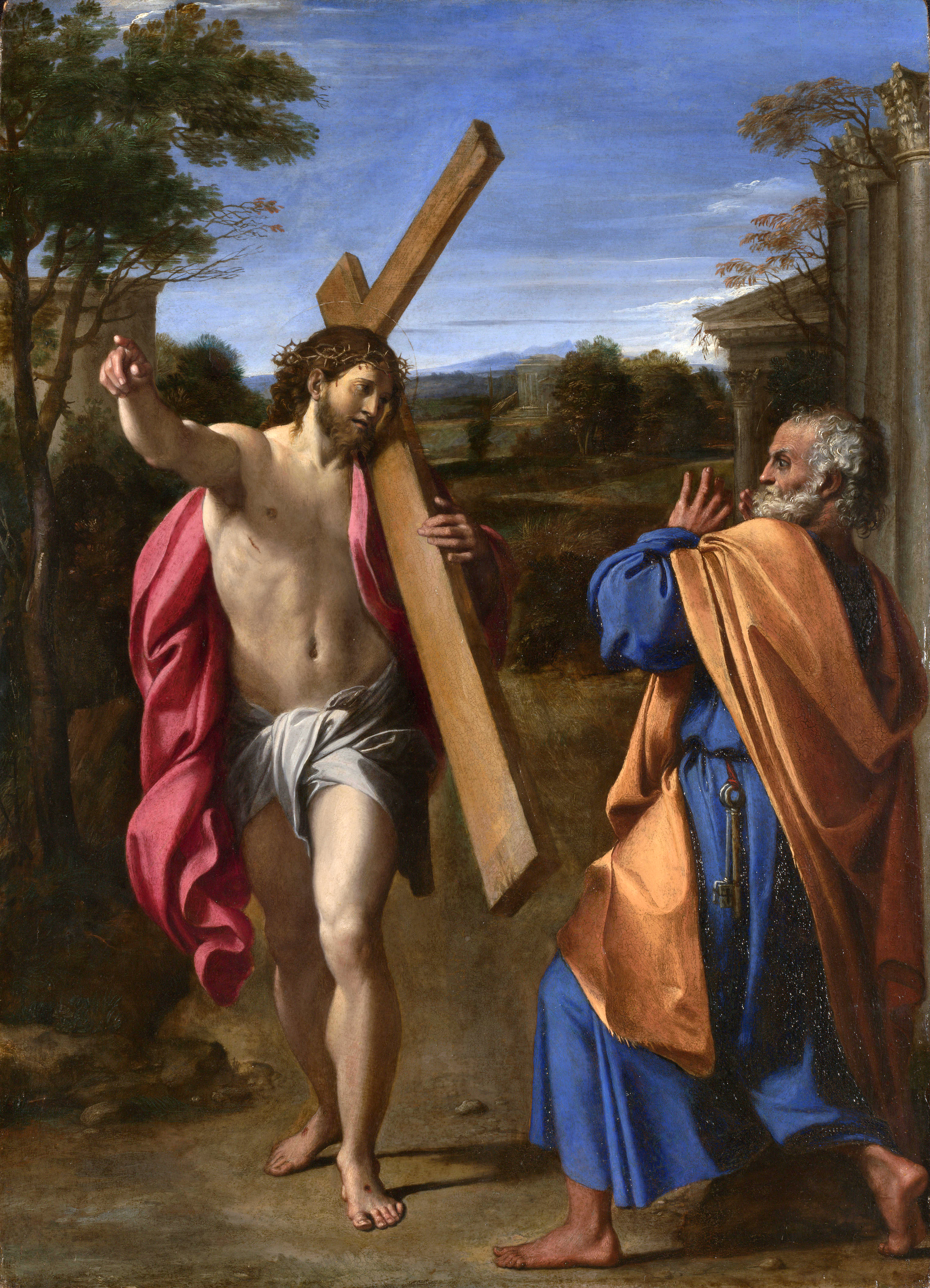
Domine, quo vadis? (1602) by Annibale Carracci

Quo vadis? (Classical Latin: [kʷoː ˈwaːdɪs], Ecclesiastical Latin: [kwo ˈvadis]) is a Latin phrase meaning "Where are you going?". It is commonly translated, quoting the King James Version translation of John 13:36, as "Whither goest thou?".

The phrase originates from the Christian tradition regarding Saint Peter's first words to the risen Christ during their encounter along the Appian Way. According to the apocryphal Acts of Peter (Vercelli Acts XXXV; late 2nd century AD), as Peter flees from crucifixion in Rome at the hands of the government, he meets the risen Jesus along the road outside the city. In the Latin translation, Peter asks Jesus, "Quo vadis?" Jesus replies, "Romam eo iterum crucifigī" ("I am going to Rome to be crucified again"). Peter then gains the courage to continue his ministry and returns to the city, where he is martyred by being crucified upside-down. The Church of Domine Quo Vadis in Rome is built where the meeting between Peter and Jesus traditionally took place.

The words "quo vadis" as a question also occur at least seven times in the Latin Vulgate.

== Meaning as used idiomatically ==
When used idiomatically, in ordinary day-to-day language, the phrase usually is spoken or written to inquire about someone's purpose, ambitions, or decisions in a particular situation. It may also be employed to encourage introspection or to express surprise or confusion regarding someone's actions or decisions. In general, this phrase prompts individuals to consider their direction and purpose [especially when questionable], urging them to reflect on their goals or to assess the consequences of their choices.

The reply of Jesus "Romam eo iterum crucifigī" is also used idiomatically in modern language to symbolize the return to something that is harmful or hurtful to oneself. Just how Jesus in the apocryphal story is returning to Rome to be crucified again, it is used in the same way where an individual, though knowing that a certain place, person, or thing has been a cause of hurt or harm in the past, they still return to it. Thus, one might say that an individual is "returning to Rome" when that individual is knowingly returning to something which causes either physical or mental harm, akin to how Jesus was returning to Rome to be crucified again.

== In culture ==
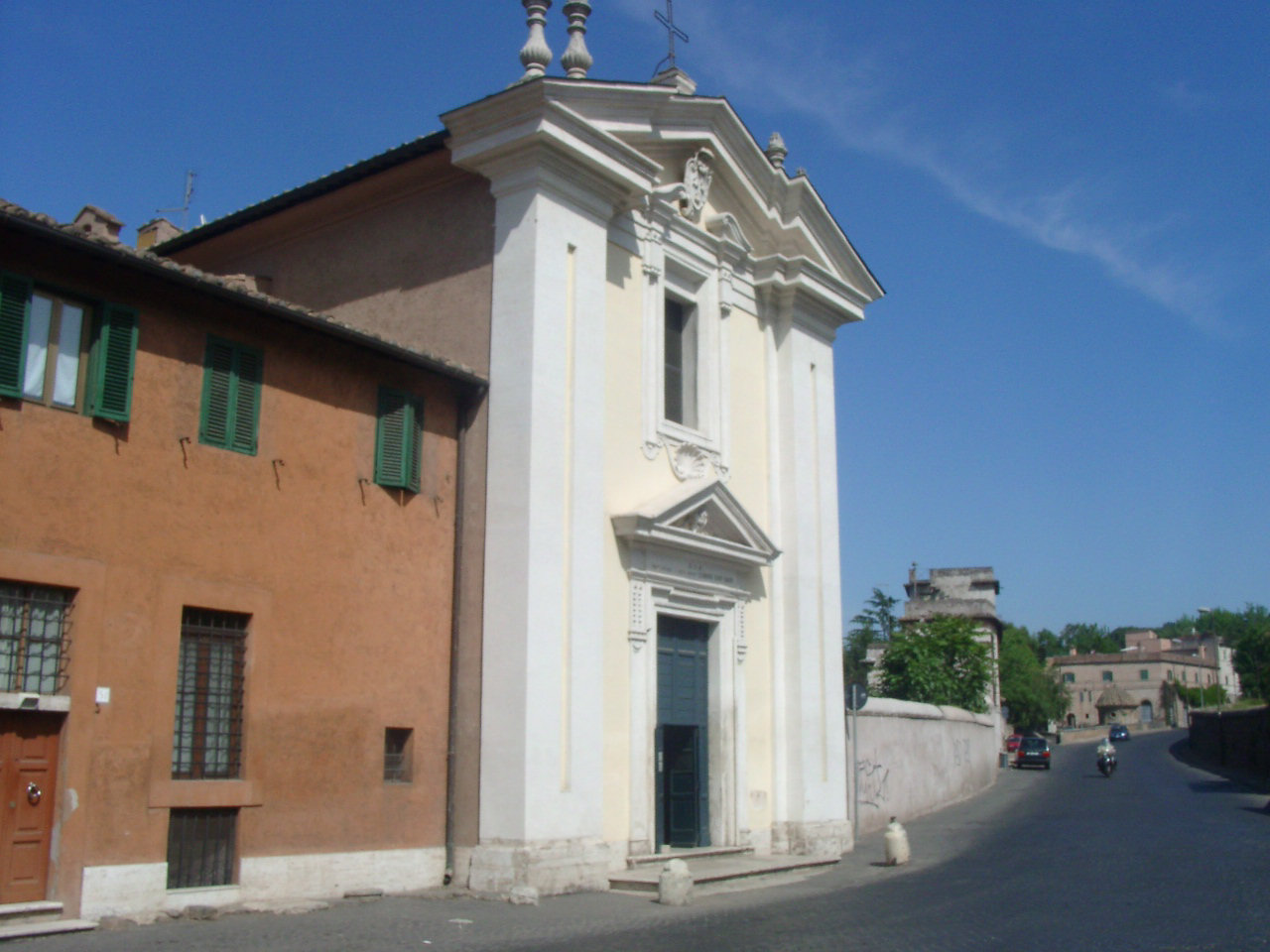
A two-story building with a classical pediment and pillars. Quo Vadis church (also known as Santa Maria in Palmis) on the Via Appia in Rome.

The Polish writer Henryk Sienkiewicz wrote the novel Quo Vadis: A Narrative of the Time of Nero (published in installments between 1895 and 1896). The book in turn has been made into motion pictures several times, including a 1951 version that was nominated for eight Academy Awards. For this and other novels, Sienkiewicz received the 1905 Nobel Prize for Literature.

In a season four episode of M*A*S*H entitled "Quo Vadis, Captain Chandler?" the reference pertains to Jesus Christ. A shellshocked officer arrives at the hospital believing he is the Christ. He has numerous conversations with the characters, including Father Mulcahy. He ultimately leaves the MASH unit for an evacuation hospital, still unrecovered.

Quo Vadis, Aida? is a film by director Jasmila Žbanić about the Srebrenica massacre.

Quo Vadis has also been used as a name by many companies and groups. Quo Vadis is the name of a restaurant in London. A students' club at University of Pittsburgh, established in 1944 to give tours of the Nationality Rooms, is called Quo Vadis.
