= Leucius Charinus =

Early Christian Apostolic apocrypha

Leucius, called Leucius Charinus by Photios in the ninth century, is named by Evodius, bishop of Uzala, as the author of a cycle of what M. R. James termed "postolic romances". These works seem to have had wide currency long before a selection from them was read aloud at the Second Council of Nicaea (787) and then rejected. Leucius is not among the early heretical teachers mentioned by name in Irenaeus' Adversus haereses (ca. 180). Most of the works seem to be products of the mid-third century.

The fullest account of Leucius is that given by Photius (Codex 114). He describes a book, called The Circuits of the Apostles, which contained the Acts of Peter, John, Andrew, Thomas, and Paul, that was purported to have been written by "Leucius Charinus". Photius considers it to be full of folly, self-contradiction, falsehood, and impiety (Wace); Photius is the only source to give his second name, "Charinus". Epiphanius (Haer. 51.427) made Leucius a disciple of John who joined his master in opposing the Ebionites, a characterization that appears unlikely, since other patristic writers agree that the cycle attributed to him was docetic, which denies the humanity of Jesus as Christ. Augustine knew the cycle, which he attributed to "Leutius", which his adversary Faustus of Mileve thought had been wrongly excluded from the New Testament canon by the Catholics. Gregory of Tours found a copy of the Acts of Andrew from the cycle and made an epitome of it, omitting the "tiresome" elaborations of detail he had found within.

The "Leucian Acts" are as follows:

- The Acts of John
- The Acts of Peter
- The Acts of Paul
- The Acts of Andrew
- The Acts of Thomas

== Reported beliefs ==
Heterodoxy

Certain passages within the Leucian writings suggest a docetic or modalist view of Christ and the trinity. The inconsistency of the Christological language used within the texts either suggests that the works are indeed authored by multiple writers with differing views on the trinity, or that they are authored by someone with emphasis on narrative storytelling but very little theological education.

Before the discovery of the Gnostic texts in the Nag Hammadi codex, scholars believed that the Leucian acts were Gnostic writings, however modern scholars with access to the Nag Hammadi codex reject this, as it does not have the distinct dualism or esoteric terminology of genuine Gnostic writings such as the Apocryphon of John or the Gospel of Judas.

Statements on the Crucifixion

Regarding the historical crucifixion of Jesus, Photios of Constantinople references a report attributed to Leucius Charinus:

"He said that Christ was not crucified, but another in his place, while he himself laughed at the mistake of the executioners."

Leucius' statements are sometimes used in Islamic polemics against Christianity as this account is similar to the narrative of Jesus' crucifixion in Islam. In the Islamic holy text, the Quran. The Quranic narrative in Surah 4:157 states:

"They did not kill him, nor did they crucify him, but it appeared so to them. Indeed, those who differ over it are in doubt about it. They have no knowledge of it except the following of assumption. And they did not kill him, for certain."

Later Islamic scholars of both the Sunni and Shia factions expanded on this tradition. According to the account of the historian al-Tabari (839–923), a leader among the Jews, Yesûʿa, was mistakenly crucified in place of ʿĪsā (Jesus). Tabari recounts that God caused Yesûʿa to resemble ʿĪsā, leading to confusion among those present. While Yesûʿa protested his identity, the crowd crucified him, believing he was ʿĪsā. Meanwhile, ʿĪsā was raised to heaven to remain there until his second coming. Some Muslim sects, such as the Ahmadiyya community, reject this narrative, offering their own expansion on Jesus' death.

Despite this, the crucifixion of Jesus, along with the baptism of Jesus is considered one of the two historical facts about Jesus' life and is considered a definite fact, not contended by any mainstream scholars.

== Possible mention in the Acts of Pilate ==
In another apocryphal work, the Acts of Pilate (also known as the Gospel of Nicodemus), two men named Leucius and Charinus are said to be raised from the dead following the crucifixion. These men reportedly testify before the Jewish Sanhedrin, describing how the "Good Thief" (referred to here as Dismas) accompanied Christ through death into the limbo of Hell, where Christ delivered the righteous Old Testament saints.

The mention of Leucius and Charinus stands out, as no explanation is provided for their inclusion in this narrative. Furthermore, the Acts of Pilate is generally dated about a century later than the Leucian acts, raising questions about the connection between the two texts and the significance of these names.
