= Book of the Cock =

Geʽez passion gospel

The Book of the Cock (also known as the Ethiopic Book of the Cock or the Book of the Rooster; (Note: Crowley suggested it be called The Homily and Teaching of our Fathers the Holy Apostles.) Geʽez: Mäṣḥafä Dorho, መጽሐፈ፡ ዶርሆ፡) is a Geʽez narrative of the passion of Jesus, making it a passion gospel. It was likely written in the fifth or sixth centuries and is based on an earlier version in Arabic or Greek. It has contemporary use among some Ethiopian Christians.

== Description and contents ==
The Book of the Cock is a Geʽez narrative of the passion of Jesus (a passion gospel). It is likely based on a vorlage (an earlier version) in Arabic or Greek. It was probably written in the 400s or 500s. (Note: Piovanelli 2003, p. 428, gives the date as either the fifth or sixth centuries. Piovanelli 2009, p. 226, gives the date as between 451 and 479. Kelley 2015, p. 15, gives the date as the fifth century.) It uses material from the four gospels (Mark, Luke, Matthew, and John) and various other sources.

It describes the final three days of Jesus's life, including a sequence where he reanimates a rooster who spies on Judas Iscariot plotting his betrayal of Jesus. (Note: This rooster gives the book its name.) The rooster tells Jesus and his disciples of the plan. Among other events, the Book of the Rooster describes Saul of Tarsus' participation in the arrest, abuse and crucifixion of Jesus, the betrayal of Jesus by a female relative of Judas, a debate between Pilate and Herod about the culpability of Jesus, Mary's grief, John the Evangelist witnessing the crucifixion of Jesus, and the conversations Jesus had with the two thieves he was crucified alongside (Gestas (Awsēmobyā) and Demas (Salikonilidākki)). It refers to various miracles Jesus performed during his life. The rooster may be based on the Ziz of Jewish mythology, a giant bird. Like the Gospel of Judas from the second century, it attempts to explain the betrayal of Judas before the Last Supper – an act which is traditionally seen as abrupt or lacking reason.

== History and cultural importance ==
In the nineteenth century, the rooster sequence was thought to be a complete story; in 1985, biblical scholar Roger Crowley wrote that it was a sequence within a larger narrative.

Pierluigi Piovanelli describes the Book of the Cock as a "quasi-canonical" book with prominent contemporary use in the Christian community in Ethiopia. Over half of the existing manuscripts of the text (or manuscripts preserving a portion of the text) reside in Ethiopian libraries, and it has been used alongside other Christian texts in Ethiopian Holy Week activities.

== Bibliography ==
- Crowley, Roger W. (1985). "The so-called "Ethiopic Book of the Cock" – Part of an apocryphal passion gospel, The Homily and Teaching of our Fathers the Holy Apostles". Journal of the Royal Asiatic Society of Great Britain and Ireland. 117 (1): 16–22. doi:10.1017/S0035869X00154905. S2CID 162813973.
- Kelley, Nicole (2015). "The fragmentation and inversion of empire in the Christian apocryphal acts". In Meconi, David Vincent (ed.). Sacred scripture and secular struggles. The Bible in Ancient Christianity. Brill. ISBN 9789004304567.
- Le Quellec, Jean-Loïc [in French] (2017). "A version of the Comparative Denial in the manuscript 'Aqd al-Gahwar". Fabula. 58 (3–4): 335–342. doi:10.1515/fabula-2017-0029.
- Piovanelli, Pierluigi (2003). "Exploring the Ethiopic Book of the Cock, an apocryphal passion gospel from late antiquity". Harvard Theological Review. 96 (4): 427–454. doi:10.1017/S0017816003000518. S2CID 162634709.
- Piovanelli, Pierluigi. "Livre du Coq." Pages 137–203 in Volume 2 of Écrits Apocryphes Chrétiens. Edited by Pierre Geoltrain and Jean-Daniel Kaestli. Bibliothèque de la Pléiade 516. Paris: Gallimard, 2005.
- Piovanelli, Pierluigi (2009). "Rabbi Yehuda versus Judas Iscariot". In DeConick, April D. (ed.). The Codex Judas papers. Nag Hammadi and Manichaean Studies. Brill. ISBN 9789004181403.
- Suciu, Alin (2015). "The recovery of the lost fragment preserving the title of the Coptic Book of Bartholomew". Apocrypha. 26: 239–259. doi:10.1484/J.APOCRA.5.109951.
