= Pseudo-Marcellus =

Pseudo-Marcellus is an anonymous writer of an early Christian document named Passio sanctorum Petri et Pauli. It is a reworking of apocryphal traditions concerning the martyrdom of Paul. In the text the emperor Nero's fury after the breakdown of the magician Simon is immediate cause for Peter's and Paul's martyrdom.
