= Passion Gospels =

Genre of Christian texts

Passion Gospels are early Christian texts that either mostly or exclusively relate to the last events of Jesus' life: the Passion of Jesus. They are generally classed as New Testament apocrypha. The last chapters of the four canonical gospels (Matthew, Mark, Luke, and John) include Passion narratives, but later Christians hungered for more details. Just as infancy gospels expanded the stories of young Jesus, Passion Gospels expanded the story of Jesus's arrest, trial, execution, resurrection, and the aftermath. These documents usually claimed to be written by a participant mentioned in the gospels, with Nicodemus, Pontius Pilate, and Joseph of Arimathea as popular choices for author. These documents are considered more legendary than historical, however, and were not included in the eventual Canon of the New Testament.

== Gospel of Peter ==
The Gospel of Peter (Greek: κατά Πέτρον ευαγγέλιον, kata Petron euangelion), or Gospel according to Peter, is an ancient text concerning Jesus, only partially known today. It is considered a non-canonical gospel and was rejected as apocryphal by the Catholic Church's synods of Carthage and Rome, which established the New Testament canon. It was the first of the non-canonical gospels to be rediscovered, preserved in the dry climate of Egypt.

The surviving fragment of the Gospel of Peter is the passion narrative. It is unknown whether the entire gospel was solely a Passion narrative, or if it included other aspects of Jesus's life. The Gospel of Peter ascribes responsibility for the crucifixion of Jesus to Herod Antipas rather than to Pontius Pilate, and was part of a trend that sought to increase the culpability of the Jews and reduce the culpability of Pilate.

== Pilate cycle ==
A variety of apocryphal works were attributed to Pontius Pilate or else claimed to be letters to Pilate, with works claiming to be to or from Pilate being produced as late as the Renaissance. These are often grouped together as the Pilate cycle, although they had different authors and often advance different agendas - some works praise Pilate as a martyr and Christian who was fulfilling the prophecies, while others consider Pilate a criminal who suffers a horrific fate.

Works in the Pilate cycle include the Anaphora Pilati (Report of Pilate), the Letter of Herod to Pilate, the Letter of Pilate to Claudius, the Letter of Pilate to Herod, the Letter of Pilate to Tiberius, the Letter of Tiberius to Pilate, the Mors Pilati (Death of Pilate), The Narrative of Joseph of Arimathea, the Paradosis Pilati (The Handing Over of Pilate), and the Vindicta Salvatoris (The Vengeance of the Savior). The most notable and popular of the cycle, the Acta Pilati (Acts of Pilate), is covered below.

=== Gospel of Nicodemus ===
The Gospel of Nicodemus, also known as the Acts of Pilate (Latin: Acta Pilati; Ancient Greek: Πράξεις Πιλάτου), is a New Testament apocrypha gospel claimed to have been derived from an original Hebrew work written by Nicodemus, who appears in the Gospel of John as an associate of Jesus. The title "Gospel of Nicodemus" is medieval in origin. The dates of its accreted sections are uncertain, but according to the 1907 edition of the Catholic Encyclopedia scholars agree in assigning the resulting work to the middle of the fourth century AD.

The section about Pilate is an older text found in the Greek Acts of Peter and Paul and, according to the surviving version, is an official document from Pontius Pilate (or composed from reports at the praetorium at Jerusalem) reporting events in Judea to Emperor Tiberius, and referring to the crucifixion of Jesus, as well as his miracles.

== Pseudo-Cyril of Jerusalem, on the Life and the Passion of Christ ==
On the Life and the Passion of Christ or CPC 0113 is an apocryphal account of Jesus written in Sahidic. According to its written introduction, it is "a homily which the holy Apa Cyril [...] delivered", meaning Cyril of Jerusalem. Scholars, however, assume the homily to be a Pseudo-Cyrillian work. It is dated no earlier than the 8th century AD and, according to the introduction, was delivered "in the early morning of the fourth day of the Great Pascha", making it an Easter homily focusing mostly on the passion of Christ.

== Gospel of Bartholomew ==
The Gospel of Bartholomew is a missing text amongst the New Testament apocrypha, mentioned in several early sources. It may be identical to either the Questions of Bartholomew, the Resurrection of Jesus Christ (by Bartholomew), or neither. In the prologue to his commentary on Matthew, Jerome mentions a "Gospel of Bartholomew" among several other apocryphal gospels.

The author of the Decretum Gelasianum includes "the Gospels in the name of Bartholomew" in a list of condemned or unacceptable scriptures.
