= Acts of Thomas =

Apocryphal book of apostolic acts

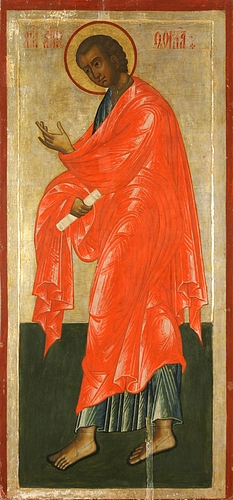
- Eastern icon of Thomas the Apostle

Information
- Religion: Christianity
- Author: Unknown, sometimes ascribed to Leucius Charinus
- Language: Syriac, Greek
- Period: Early Christianity

Acts of Thomas is an early 3rd-century text, one of the New Testament apocrypha within the Acts of the Apostles subgenre. It was originally a work of Syriac literature, composed in Edessa before 240 AD, but complete versions survive in both Syriac and Greek. The surviving Syriac manuscripts, however, have been edited to purge them of the most unorthodox overtly Encratite passages, so that the Greek versions reflect the earlier tradition. The earliest external reference to the Acts of Thomas dates to c.225 in Origen's Exegesis on Genesis, although this text is now lost and its citation survives via later texts, e.g. Eusebius of Caesarea's Ecclesiastical History (3.1.1–3).

Fragments of four other cycles of romances around the figure of the apostle Thomas survive, but this is the only complete one. It should not be confused with the early "sayings" Gospel of Thomas. "Like other apocryphal acts combining popular legend and religious propaganda, the work attempts to entertain and instruct. In addition to narratives of Thomas' adventures, its poetic and liturgical elements provide important evidence for early Syrian Christian traditions," according to the Anchor Bible Dictionary.

Acts of Thomas is a series of episodic Acts (Latin passio) that are said to have occurred during the evangelistic mission of Judas Thomas ("Judas the Twin") to Northwest India, specifically the Persian Kingdom and the Indo-Parthian Kingdom. It ends with his martyrdom: he dies pierced with spears, having earned the ire of the monarch Misdaeus, thought to be Abdagases I, a viceroy of the Gondophares in Sistan, modern day southern Afghanistan, because of his conversion of Misdaeus' wives and a relative, Charisius. He was imprisoned while converting Indian followers won through the performing of miracles.

Embedded in the Acts of Thomas at different places according to differing manuscript traditions is a Syriac hymn, The Hymn of the Pearl, (or Hymn of the Soul), a poem that gained a great deal of popularity in mainstream Christian circles. The Hymn is older than the Acts into which it has been inserted, and is worth appreciating on its own. The text is interrupted with the poetry of another hymn, the one that begins "Come, thou holy name of the Christ that is above every name" (2.27), a theme that was taken up in Catholic Christianity in the 13th century as the Holy Name.

Mainstream Christian tradition rejects the Acts of Thomas as pseudepigraphical and apocryphal, and for its part, the Roman Catholic Church declared the book as heretical at the Council of Trent. See also Leucius Charinus.

Thomas is often referred to by his name Judas (his full name is Thomas Judas Didymus), since both Thomas and Didymus just mean twin, and several scholars believe that twin is just a description, and not intended as a name. The manuscripts end "The acts of Judas Thomas the apostle are completed, which he did in India, fulfilling the commandment of him that sent him. Unto whom be glory, world without end. Amen."

== Acts of Thomas ==
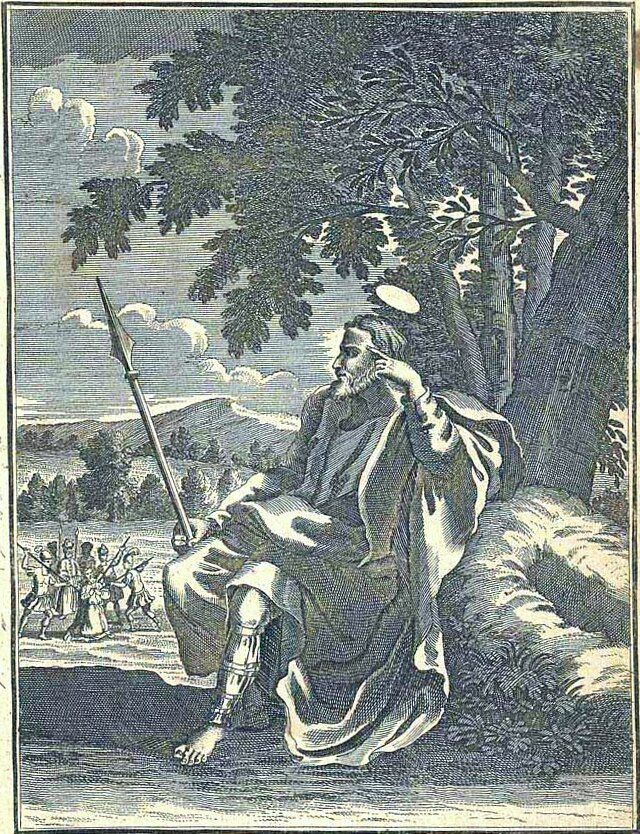
Thomas is martyred (background) his eventual martyrdom (foreground)

The Acts of Thomas connects Thomas the apostle's Indian ministry with two kings. According to one of the legends in the Acts, Thomas was at first reluctant to accept this mission, but the Lord appeared to him in a night vision and said, “Fear not, Thomas. Go away to India and proclaim the Word, for my grace shall be with you.” But the Apostle still demurred, so the Lord overruled the stubborn disciple by ordering circumstances so compelling that he was forced to accompany an Indian merchant, Abbanes, to his native place in north-west India, where he found himself in the service of the Indo-Parthian king Gondophares. The apostle's ministry resulted in many conversions throughout the kingdom, including the king and his brother.

The claim made by the acts of Thomas that he traveled to the land of the Parthians and the border of India is supported by other recordings of the time, from writers such as Ephrem the Syrian, Eusebius and Origen The Acts of Thomas states that this is where he died, impaled by spears after earning the ire of the monarch Misdaeus, thought to be Abdagases I, a viceroy of the Gondophares in Sistan, modern day southern Afghanistan. According to the legend, Thomas was a skilled carpenter and was bidden to build a palace for the king. However, the Apostle decided to teach the king a lesson by devoting the royal grant to acts of charity and thereby laying up treasure for the heavenly abode.

== Content ==
The text is broken by headings:

- 1 - when he went into India with Abbanes the merchant. It even says that Jesus is the son of Joseph. The apostles cast lots to see who will go where as a missionary. Thomas is assigned India but refuses to go, even after Jesus speaks to him. Jesus then appears in human form and sells Thomas to a merchant as a slave, since Thomas is skilled as a carpenter. Thomas is then asked if Jesus is his master, which he affirms. It is only then that he accepts the mission to India.
- 2 - concerning his coming unto the king Gundaphorus
- 3 - concerning the serpent
- 4 - concerning the colt
- 5 - concerning the devil that took up his abode in the woman
- 6 - of the youth that murdered the woman. A young couple begin to have relationship problems when the young woman proves to be too keen on sex, while the young man promotes being chaste, honouring the teachings of Thomas. So, the young man kills his lover. He comes to take the eucharist with others in the presence of Thomas, but his hand withers, and Thomas realises that the young man has committed a grave sin. Upon being confronted, the young man reveals what he did and his reason for doing so. As such, Thomas forgives him as his motive was good, and he goes to find the woman's body. In an inn, Thomas and those with him lay the woman's body on a couch and after praying, Thomas has the young man hold his lover's hand, whereupon the woman comes back to life.
- 7 - of the Captain
- 8 - of the wild asses
- 9 - of the wife of Charisius
- 10 - wherein Mygdonia receiveth baptism
- 11 - concerning the wife of Misdaeus
- 12 - concerning Ouazanes (Iuzanes) the son of Misdaeus
- 13 - wherein Iuzanes receiveth baptism with the rest
- The Martyrdom of Thomas

== View of Jesus ==
The view of Jesus in the book could be inferred to be docetic. Thomas is not just Jesus' twin, he is Jesus' identical twin. Hence, it is possible that Thomas signifies the earthly, human side of Jesus, while Jesus is entirely spiritual in his being. In this way, Jesus directs Thomas' quest from heaven, while Thomas does the work on earth.

Also in line with Gnostic thinking is the text's description of Jesus' stance on sex. For example, in one scene, Jesus appears to a young woman who has just gotten married in her bridal chamber. He advises against copulation even for reproductive purposes.

== Bibliography ==
- Leslie W. Brown, The Indian Christians of St. Thomas: an account of the ancient Syrian Church of Malabar, rev'd edn. Cambridge: Cambridge University Press, 1982, p. 49–59.
- Eusebius, Ecclesiastical History, chapter 4:30
- J. N. Farquhar, The Apostle Thomas in North India (Manchester: University Press, 1926), chapter 4, fully repr. in George Menachery, ed., Indian Church History Classics, vol. 1: The Nazranies (Ollur, Thrissur: South Asia Research Assistance Services, 1998).
- Stefan Heining, Taufe statt Ehe: Ein Beitrag zur Erforschung der Thomasakten (= Baptism instead of marriage: A contribution to the exploration of the Acts of Thomas), Univ. Diss., Wurzburg, 2020. (urn:nbn:de:bvb:20-opus-210796; https://nbn-resolving.org/urn:nbn:de:bvb:20-opus-210796; cc-by-sa)
- M. R. James, trans. The Apocryphal New Testament: being the Apocryphal Gospels, Acts, Epistles, and Apocalypses, with other narratives and fragments newly translated, 2nd edn. Oxford: Clarendon, 1953, pp. 364–436.
- A. E. Medlycott. India and the Apostle Thomas: an inquiry, with a critical analysis of the Acta Thomae (London: David Nutt, 1905), pp. 1–17, 213–97. fully repr. in George Menachery, ed., Indian Church History Classics, vol. 1: The Nazranies (Ollur, Thrissur: South Asia Research Assistance Services, 1998).
- Vincent A. Smith. Early History of India from 600 B.C. to the Muhammadan conquest, including the invasion of Alexamder the Great, 4th edn. Oxford: Clarendon, 1957, p. 235
