= Acts of the Apostles (genre) =

Genre of early Christian texts

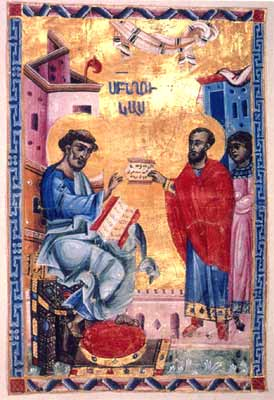
Saint Luke the Evangelist by Toros Roslin

The Acts of the Apostles is a genre of early Christian literature, recounting the lives and works of the apostles of Jesus. The Acts (Latin: Acta; Greek: Πράξεις Práxeis) are important for many reasons, one of them being the concept of apostolic succession. They also provide insight into the valuation of "missionary activities among the exotic races," since some of them feature missionary work done among, for instance, the Cynocephaly.

== Examples ==
=== The canonical Acts of the Apostles ===
Only one work in this genre is included in the New Testament canon, entitled the Acts of the Apostles, sometimes called the Book of Acts or simply Acts, and primarily concerns the activities of Saint Peter, John the Apostle, and Paul the Apostle, who becomes the main character after converting to Christianity in chapter 9. It is presumably the second part of a two-part work, the Canonical Gospel of Luke being the first part, with both works being addressed to Theophilus, and sharing a similar style. Almost all scholars believe that they were written by the same person.

The book narrates how the resurrected Jesus makes the apostles his witnesses, and instructs them to convert all peoples to the ends of the earth (Acts 1:8). Through the Holy Spirit, God then empowers the apostles in their missionary work, with the ability to perform miracles such as healing the sick, casting out demons and raising the dead, while spreading Jesus' gospel. Problems such as anti-Christian persecutions, and conflicts about whether converts should first become Jewish before they can become Christians, are overcome.

The Book of Acts was probably written around the year 80 or 85 CE. It is not so much concerned with historical accuracy as it is with furthering a particular theology from a certain religious point of view.

=== Non-canonical acts ===
The early church did not include any other books within the genre into the Christian Bible. These documents are considered apocryphal by all churches. They tend to be later, legendary accounts about the twelve apostles written in the 2nd and 3rd centuries CE. The books normally do not claim to be written by apostles, but are anonymous, and thus they are not considered pseudepigrapha and forgeries. Unlike the canonical Book of Acts, they focus on the exploits of individual apostles.

As a genre, the apocryphal acts tend to feature "travels, dangers, controversies, deliverances, thwarted sexual trysts, miraculous demonstrations of the power of God" within an episodic narrative. They bear a resemblance to the five surviving ancient Greek novels and the two surviving ancient Roman novels in Latin (The Golden Ass and the Satyricon). The overarching theme in these popular pagan romances is that heterosexual marital love is the basis for social peace and prosperity. The general plot is that a man and a woman from the upper classes fall in love, but become tragically separated before they can consummate their sexual love until the very end of the story, overcoming various hardships before being reunited. The Christian apocryphal acts turn these characteristics on their heads, however: the wealth and beauty of this world are to be despised, and any sexual activity is condemned as 'impure', in favour of love for God and preparation for the coming heavenly afterlife.

Five of the non-canonical acts have survived almost completely, namely the Acts of John, Peter, Paul, Andrew, and Thomas. A large number of other narratives only exist in fragmentary form.

== List of acts ==
The following list is not exhaustive.

- Acts of Andrew, c. 180 CE in Greek, reconstructed from Greek, Latin, Coptic and Armenian fragments
- Acts of Andrew and Bartholomew, 5th century in Greek
- Acts of the Apostles, canonical, c. 80 to 85 CE in Greek
- Acts of Barnabas, 5th century in Greek
- Acts of John, late 2nd century in Greek
- The Lost Chapter of the Acts of the Apostles, probably a 19th-century forgery in English without a Greek original
- Acts of Mar Mari, 600–650 CE in Syriac
- Acts of the Martyrs, term for a group of writings describing the martyrdom of various apostles, including:
  - Martyrdom of Polycarp, c. 4th century in Greek
  - Acts of the Scillitan Martyrs, c. 200 CE, probably the earliest Christian text in Latin
  - Passion of Saint Perpetua, Saint Felicitas, and their Companions, 3rd century in Latin and Greek
  - Acta proconsularia Cypriani
  - Acta Maximiliani
  - Acta Alexandrinorum, late 2nd to early 3rd century collection
- Acts of Paul, a collection of four texts known primarily from Greek and also other manuscripts from c. 160 CE
  - Acts of Paul and Thecla, some scholars regard the text a 1st-century creation that was later included in the Acts of Paul collection
- Acts of Peter, second half of the 2nd century in Greek, probably in Asia Minor
- Acts of Peter and Paul, also known as Passion of Saints Peter and Paul, c. 450–550 in Latin and Greek
- Acts of Peter and the Twelve, 2nd or 3rd century in Greek and Coptic
- Acts of Philip, mid-to-late 4th century in Greek; Coptic translations exist
- Acts of Pilate, mid-4th century in Greek
- Acts of Thomas, before 240 CE in Syriac and Greek
- Acts of Timothy, late 4th or 5th century in Greek

== See also ==
- General topics
  - New Testament apocrypha
  - Pseudepigrapha
  - Textual criticism
  - Twelve apostles
- Related literature
  - List of Gospels
  - Apocalyptic literature
  - Epistles
  - List of New Testament papyri
