= Colum Hourihane =

Irish-born art historian

Colum Hourihane is an Irish-born art historian, iconographer, and editor formerly of Princeton University, specialising in medieval art and iconographic studies.

He was director of the Index of Christian Art, the largest thematic and iconographic index of medieval art and architecture in the world from 1997 to 2014. There, he stewarded the project during its early days of digitisation and developed an annual conference program which placed the Index at the forefront of medieval art scholarly exchange.

== Career ==
Hourihane studied archaeology at University College Cork and the National University of Ireland Galway (1977) before earning a PhD at the Courtauld Institute of Art in 1984.

He has published on the subjects of iconography, Index history and methodology, and Gothic Irish art. He is a member of the Royal Irish Academy and a fellow of the Society of Antiquaries of London. In 2012, Hourihane edited the "Grove Encyclopedia of Medieval Art and Architecture" for Oxford University Press, and was the editor for the "Routledge Companion to Medieval Iconography" in 2017. Between 2008 and 2011, he was president of the International Center of Medieval Art.

== Selected publications ==
=== Books ===
- The Processional Cross in Late Medieval England: the Dallye Cross. London: Society of Antiquaries of London, 2005. ISBN 0854312811
- Gothic Art in Ireland 1169-1550: Enduring Vitality. New Haven: Yale University Press, 2003. ISBN 978-0-3000-9435-0
- The Mason and His Mark: Masons' Marks in the Medieval Irish Archbishoprics of Cashel and Dublin. Oxford, England: J. and E. Hedges, 2000. ISBN 1841711322

=== Articles ===
- "Classifying Subject Matter in Medieval Art: The Index of Christian Art at Princeton University." Visual Resources, Volume 20:3, 2014.
- "Sourcing the Index: Iconography and its Debt to Photography." In Futures Past: Twenty Years of Arts Computing (ed. Anna Bentkowska-Kafel), CHArt conference, 2004.
- "It Begins with the Cataloguer: Subject Access to Images and the Cataloguer's Perspective." In Introduction to Art Image Access: Issues, Tools, Standards, and Strategies (ed. Murtha Baca), Los Angeles: Getty Publications, 2002.
- "They Stand on his Shoulders: Morey, Iconography, and the Index of Christian Art." In Insights and Interpretations: Studies in Celebrations of the Eighty-fifth Anniversary of the Index of Christian Art (Princeton, NJ: Index of Christian Art/Princeton University Press, 2002), pp. 3-16.

=== Edited volumes ===
- Manuscripta Illuminata: Approaches to Understanding Medieval and Renaissance Manuscripts (ed.). Penn State University Press, 2014. ISBN 978-0-9837537-3-5
- Patronage: Power and Agency in Medieval Art (ed.). Penn State University Press, 2013. ISBN 978-0-9837-5374-2
- Abraham in Medieval Christian, Islamic, and Jewish Art (ed.). Penn State University Press, 2013. ISBN 978-0-9837537-2-8
- From Minor to Major: The Minor Arts in Medieval Art History (ed.). Penn State University Press, 2012. ISBN 978-0-9837537-1-1
- Insular and Anglo-Saxon Art and Thought in the Early Medieval Period (ed.). Penn State University Press, 2011. ISBN 978-0-9837537-0-4
- Gothic Art and Thought in the Later Medieval Period (ed.). Penn State University Press, 2011. ISBN 978-0-9768202-9-1
- Looking Beyond: Visions, Dreams, and Insights in Medieval Art and History (ed.). Penn State University Press, 2010.
- Pontius Pilate, Anti-Semitism, and the Passion in Medieval Art. Princeton University Press, 2009. ISBN 978-0-6911-3956-2
- Time in the Medieval World: Occupations of the Months and Signs of the Zodiac in the Index of Christian Art. Princeton University Press, 2007. ISBN 978-0-9768202-3-9
- Virtue and Vice: The Personifications in the Index of Christian Art, Department of Art and Archaeology, Princeton University, 2000. ISBN 978-0-6910-5037-9
- King David in the Index of Christian Art, Department of Art and Archaeology, Princeton University, 2002. ISBN 978-0691095479
- From Ireland Coming: Irish Art from the Early Christian to the Late Gothic Periods and its Context within Europe (ed.). Yale University Press, 1984.
