= Acts of Peter =

Early Christian apocryphal Acts of the Apostles

The Acts of Peter is one of the earliest of the apocryphal Acts of the Apostles in Christianity, dating to the late 2nd century AD. The majority of the text has survived only in the Latin translation of the Codex Vercellensis, under the title Actus Petri cum Simone ("Act of Peter with Simon"). It is notable for a description of a miracle contest between Saint Peter and Simon Magus, the first record of the tradition that Saint Peter was crucified head-down, and as the origin of the saying Quo vadis?

== Dating and history ==
The Acts of Peter were originally composed in Koine Greek during the second half of the 2nd century, probably in Asia Minor. The style of the Acts' writing is quite similar to that of four other apocryphal Acts – Acts of Andrew, Acts of John, Acts of Paul, and Acts of Thomas. For this reason, all five of these works were traditionally attributed to a single author; Photios I (c. 810/820 – 893) identified this author as Leucius Charinus. Epiphanius (c. 310/320 – 403) had earlier identified Leucius as a companion of John the Apostle.

The Manicheans are believed to have collected these five apocryphals Acts into a single corpus by the end of the 4th century. The current consensus is that the five works are interrelated, but were written by five separate authors, none of whom include Leucius. Despite this, the works are still frequently referred to as the "Manichean Acts of Leucius Charinus", or simply the "Leucian Acts".

The earliest extant manuscript of the Acts of Peter is a Late Latin translation contained in the Codex Vercellensis, which is believed to be the earliest manuscript of the Vetus Latina. This codex is preserved in the Capitulary Library of the Vercelli Cathedral. The chapters describing Peter's crucifixion (XXXIII–XLI) are preserved separately as 'Martyrdom of the Holy Apostle Peter' in various manuscripts in Latin, Greek, Coptic, Slavonic, Syriac, Ethiopic, Armenian, and Arabic.

It has been proposed that the martyrdom account was an earlier, separate text to which the preceding chapters were affixed.

== Content ==
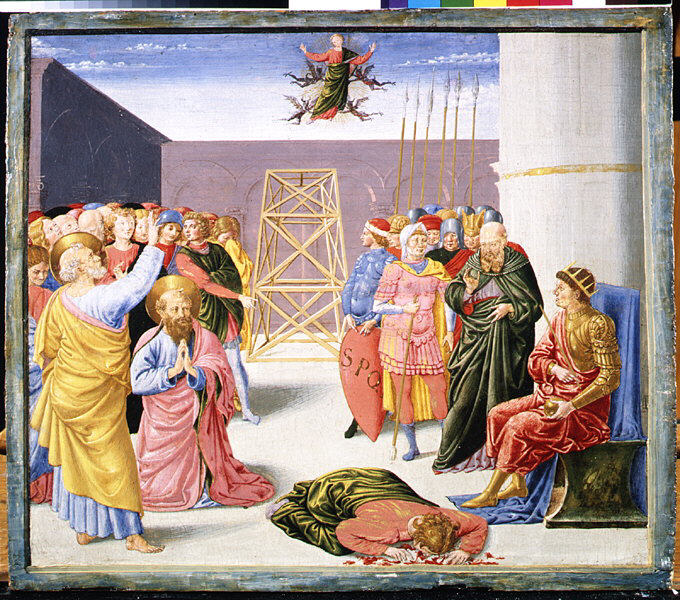
Contest between Peter and Simon Magus (Benozzo Gozzoli, 15th century)

In the text, Peter performs many miracles, such as healing a crippled beggar. Peter preaches that Simon Magus is performing magic in order to convert followers through deception. Outraged, Peter challenges Simon to a contest, in order to prove whose works are from a divine source and whose are merely trickery. In the contest, Simon takes flight, and in retaliation, Peter strikes him down with the power of God, praying that Simon not be killed but badly injured. Simon is then taken to Terracina to one Castor "And there he was sorely cut (Lat.[in Latin] by two physicians), and so Simon the angel of Satan came to his end."

Peter's confrontation with Simon Magus has some resemblance to the Prophet Elijah's confrontation with the Priests of Baal, as depicted in the Old Testament's Book of Kings – a text with which the writer of the Acts of Peter was likely familiar.

Following this incident, Peter plans to flee the city; however, he sees an apparition of Jesus, and takes it as a message that he must stay and be crucified to see Jesus again in Heaven (see Quo vadis?).

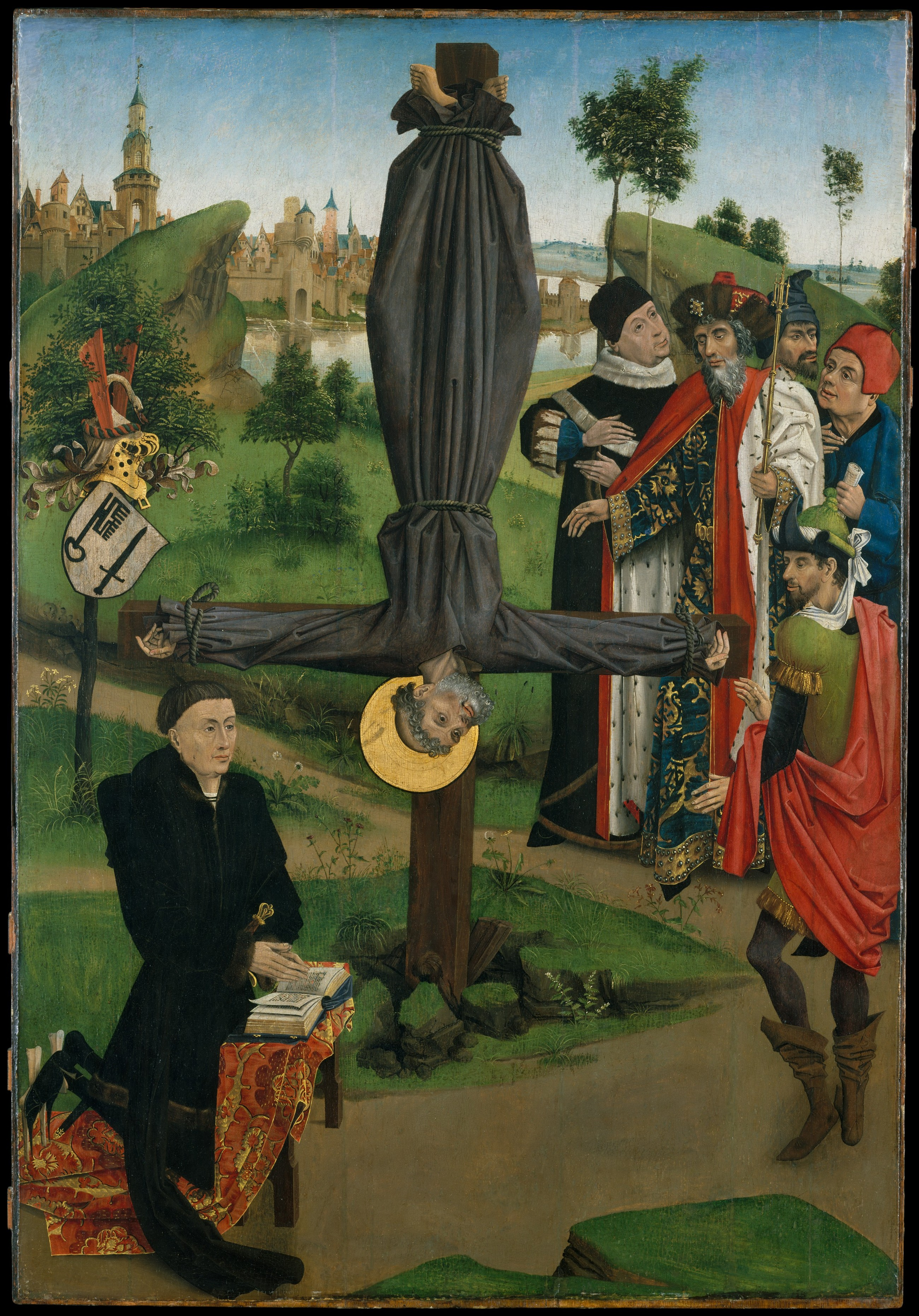
Crucifixion of Saint Peter, from a 15th-century painting

Peter preaches to prefect Agrippa's concubines that they should practise abstinence and chastity. The enraged Agrippa orders Peter to be crucified; Peter requests to be crucified upside-down.

== The inverted crucifixion of Peter ==
No canonical text refers to the death of Saint Peter. Apart from the Acts of Peter, the earliest attestation that Saint Peter was executed by crucifixion is found in Adversus Gnosticos Scorpiace, a treatise composed by Tertullian in the first decade of the 3rd century.

Sometime in the middle of the 3rd century, Origen of Alexandria popularized the tradition that Peter requested to be crucified upside-down. At the end of the 4th century, Jerome wrote in his De Viris Illustribus ("On Illustrious Men") that the reason for this request was that Peter felt he was unworthy to die in the same manner as Jesus.

However, in the Acts of Peter, the author writes that Peter's request to be crucified upside-down was to make a point: that the values of those crucifying him were inverted themselves, emphasising the need to look beyond these values and adopt those of Jesus.

== See also ==
- Acts of Peter and Andrew
- Acts of Peter and the Twelve
- Acts of Peter and Paul
- Acts of Christ and Peter in Rome
- Nero, emperor of Rome (54–68) at the time of Peter's death in "Acts of Peter", mentioned in the text
- Praefectus urbi, the prefect of the ancient city of Rome
- Quo vadis?

== Sources ==
- Richard Adelbert Lipsius, Maximilian Bonnet: Acta apostolorum apokryphae pars prior, Hermann Mendelsohn, Leipzig 1891. (in Greek and Latin)
- Elias Avery Lowe: Codices Latini Antiquiores: a palaeographical guide to Latin manuscripts prior to the ninth century. Ed. under the auspices of the Union Académique Internationale for the American Council of Learned Societies and the Carnegie Institution of Washington, Vol. 4. Clarendon, Oxford 1947, Reprint Zeller, Osnabrück 1988. Description of codex vercelli 158.
