= Acts of Peter and Paul =

Apocryphal Christian text

The Acts of Peter and Paul is a 5th-century pseudepigraphical Christian text of the genre Acts of the Apostles. An alternate version exists, known as the Passion of Peter and Paul (Passio sanctorum Petri et Pauli), with variances in the introductory part of the text. Some versions have been written by a certain Marcellus, thus the anonymous author, of whom nothing further is known and is sometimes referred to as pseudo-Marcellus. The intended Marcellus is doubtless he who after the martyrdom takes the lead in burying St. Peter "near the Naumachia in the place called the Vatican."

== Synopsis ==
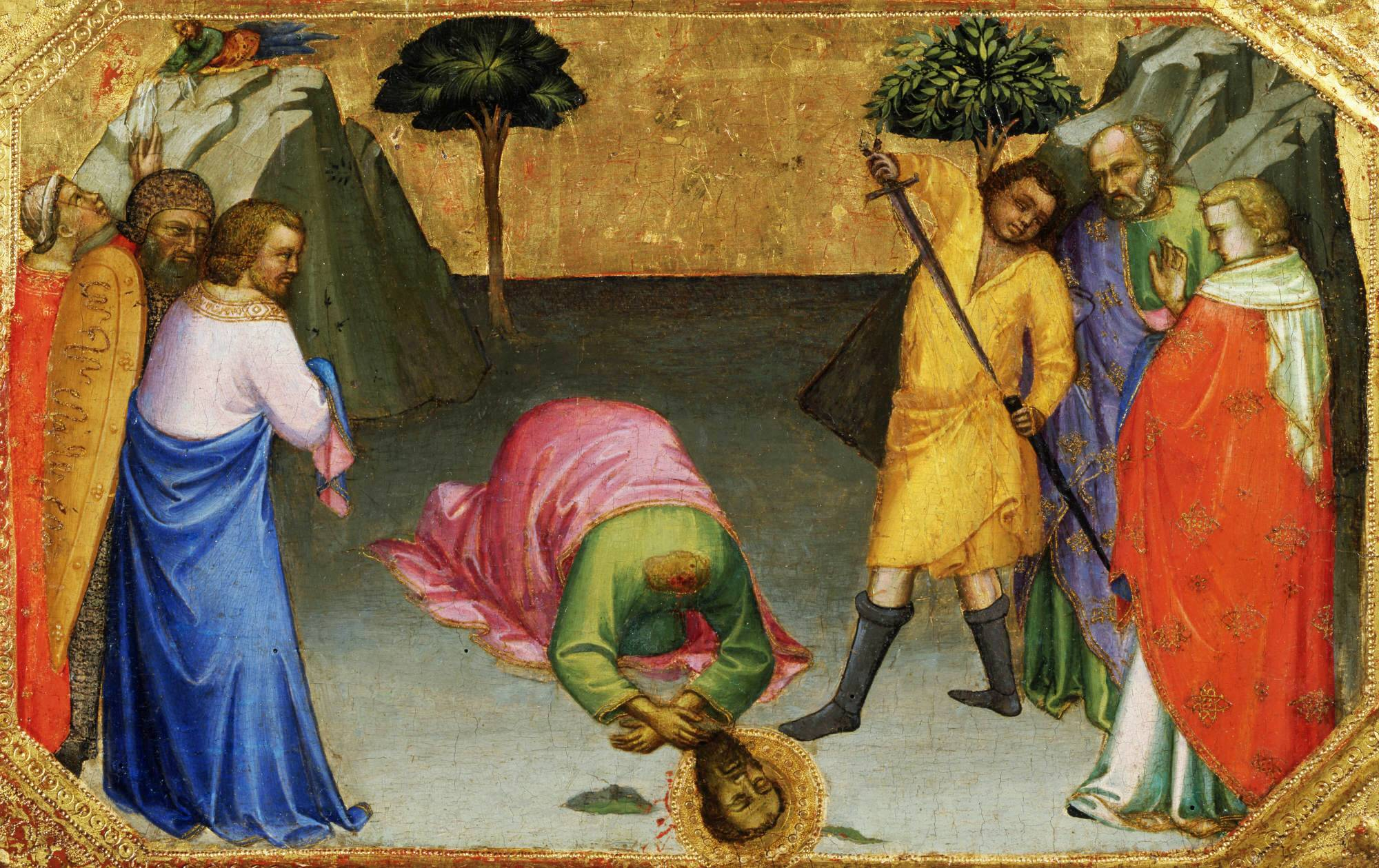
Beheading of Saint Paul (Lorenzo Monaco, 1398–1400)

The text is framed as the tale of Paul's journey from the island of "Gaudomeleta" (probably Gozo) to Rome, where it also claims that on the way the ship also lands in Melita. It assigns Peter as Paul's brother. It also describes the death of Paul by beheading, an early church tradition.

== Acts of Pilate ==
The text often includes a letter purporting to be from Pilate, known as Acts of Pilate (or Epistle of Pontius Pilate).

== Origins ==
The Passio, which appears in numerous medieval manuscripts, was known to Jacobus de Voragine who noted in his vita of the Apostle Peter, "His martyrdom wrote Marcellus, Linus pope, Hegesippus, and Leo the pope." There are two Old English analogues, Ælfric's Passio Apostolorum Petri et Pauli and the anonymous Blickling Homily 15, Spel Be Petrus & Paulus.

The work appears to have been based on the Acts of Peter, with the addition of Paul's presence where before it was only Peter's. The work is dated to around 450 to 550. Latin as well as Greek versions survive, with the latter usually being longer. The Latin versions sometimes end with "I, Marcellus, have written what I saw." This Marcellus is identified as a disciple of Simon Magus, who lived in the 1st century. Because of this obvious anachronism, since the text is clearly written centuries later, scholars have dubbed him Pseudo-Marcellus.

== Bibliography ==
- Schøyen Collection: MS 1679: Vellum ms from Bobbio, tenth century.
- Text, edited by R.A. Lipsius and M. Bonnet (in Latin)
- George Edmundson, The Church in Rome in the First Century, note E
