= Pontius Pilate =

Roman governor of Judea and condemner of Jesus

- Pontius Pilatus
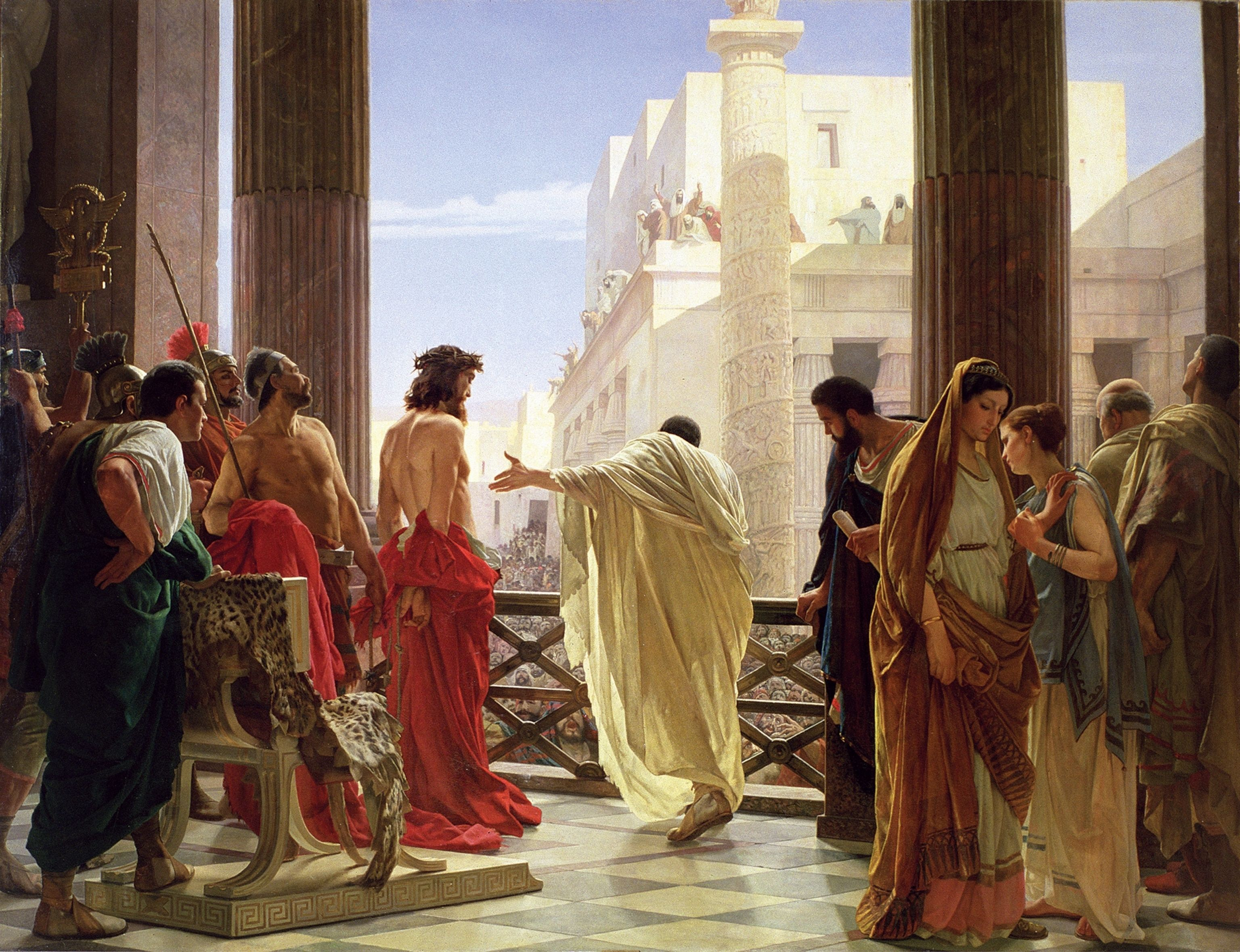
- Ecce Homo ("Behold the Man"), Antonio Ciseri's depiction, c. 1860, of Pilate presenting a scourged Jesus to the people of Jerusalem

5th Prefect of Judaea
- In office c. 26 AD – 36 AD
- Appointed by: Tiberius
- Preceded by: Valerius Gratus
- Succeeded by: Marcellus

Personal details
- Born: 1st century BC Roman Empire
- Died: After 39 AD Roman Empire
- Spouse: Unknown (Note: Later Christian tradition gives Pilate's wife the names Procula (Latin: Procula) or Procla (Ancient Greek: Πρόκλα), as well as Claudia Procula and sometimes other names such as Livia or Pilatessa.)
- Known for: Pilate's court

Pontius Pilate (Note: /ˈpɒnʃəs ˈpaɪlət, -tiəs/ PON-shəs PY-lət, -tee-əs) (Latin: Pontius Pilatus; Ancient Greek: Πόντιος Πιλᾶτος, romanized: Póntios Pilâtos) was the fifth governor of the Roman province of Judaea, serving under Emperor Tiberius from 26/27 to 36/37 AD. He is best known for being the official who presided over the trial of Jesus and ultimately ordered his crucifixion. Pilate's importance in Christianity is underscored by his prominent place in both the Apostles' and Nicene Creeds. Because the gospels portray Pilate as reluctant to execute Jesus, the Ethiopian Orthodox Tewahedo Church believes that Pilate became a Christian and venerates him as both a martyr and a saint.

Pontius Pilate is the best-attested figure to hold the position of Roman governor of Judaea, though few sources about his rule have survived. Virtually nothing is known about his life prior to becoming governor or the circumstances of his appointment. Surviving evidence includes coins he minted and the Pilate Stone inscription. Ancient sources such as Josephus, Philo, and the Gospel of Luke document several incidents of conflict between Pilate and the Jewish population, often citing his insensitivity to Jewish religious customs. The Christian gospels, as well as Josephus and Tacitus, attribute the crucifixion of Jesus to Pilate's orders.

Josephus reports that Pilate was dismissed after violently quelling a Samaritan uprising at Mount Gerizim. He was ordered to Rome by the Syrian legate to face Emperor Tiberius, but Tiberius died before Pilate arrived, and his fate thereafter remains unknown. Some early sources, including Celsus and Origen, suggest he retired. Modern historians are divided on Pilate's governance, with some viewing him as brutal and inept, while others point to his relatively long tenure as evidence of moderate competence. A once-prominent theory attributing Pilate's actions to antisemitism is now largely rejected.

In Late Antiquity and the Middle Ages, Pilate became a prominent figure in Christian apocryphal literature known as the "Pilate cycle". Eastern traditions often depicted him and his wife as Christian converts and even saints, while Western texts portrayed him negatively, frequently linking his death to suicide and associating his burial site with cursed locations. Pilate has appeared extensively in art, especially in depictions of Jesus's trial. In medieval passion plays, his character varied from reluctant judge to malevolent villain. He has been portrayed in modern literature and film, with notable literary treatments by Anatole France, Mikhail Bulgakov, and Chingiz Aitmatov. He received increased literary attention following World War II.

== Life and political career ==
=== Sources ===
Sources on Pontius Pilate are limited, although modern scholars know more about him than other Roman governors of Judaea. The most important sources are the Embassy to Gaius (after the year 41) by contemporary Jewish writer Philo of Alexandria, the Jewish Wars (written c. AD 74, ch. 2.9) and Antiquities of the Jews (c. AD 94, ch. 18.3) by the Jewish historian Josephus, as well as the four canonical gospels, Mark (66–70), Luke (80–90), Matthew (80–90), and John (90–100), the texts of which are anonymous, with traditional apostolic authorship debated. Pilate is also mentioned in the Acts of the Apostles (composed between 80 and 90) and in the anonymous First Epistle to Timothy (written in the second half of the 1st century). Ignatius of Antioch mentions him in his epistles to the Trallians, Magnesians, and Smyrnaeans (composed between 105 and 110). He is also briefly mentioned in Annals of the Roman historian Tacitus (early 2nd century), who simply says that he put Jesus to death. Two additional chapters of Tacitus's Annals that might have mentioned Pilate have been lost. The written sources provide only limited information, and each has its own biases, with the gospels in particular providing a theological rather than historical perspective, resembling ancient biographies by insiders rather than objective studies or modern biographies.

Besides these texts, dated coins in the name of emperor Tiberius minted during Pilate's governorship have survived, as well as a fragmentary short inscription that names Pilate, known as the Pilate Stone, the only inscription about a Roman governor of Judaea predating the Jewish–Roman wars to survive.

=== Name and early life ===
The sources give no indication of Pilate's life prior to his becoming governor of Judaea. His praenomen (first name) is unknown; his cognomen Pilatus might mean "skilled with the javelin (pilum)", but it could also refer to the pileus or Phrygian cap, possibly indicating that one of Pilate's ancestors was a freedman. If it means "skilled with the javelin", it is possible that Pilate won the cognomen for himself while serving in the Roman military; it is also possible that his father acquired the cognomen through military skill. In the Gospels of Mark and John, Pilate is only called by his cognomen, which Marie-Joseph Ollivier takes to mean that this was the name by which he was generally known in common speech.

The name Pontius suggests that an ancestor of his came from Samnium in central, southern Italy, and he may have belonged to the family of Gavius Pontius and Pontius Telesinus, two leaders of the Samnites in the third and first centuries BC, respectively, before their full incorporation to the Roman Republic. Like all but one other governor of Judaea, Pilate was of the equestrian order, a middle rank of the Roman nobility. As one of the attested Pontii, Pontius Aquila (an assassin of Julius Caesar), was a tribune of the plebs, the family must have originally been of plebeian origin and later became ennobled as equestrians.

Pilate was likely educated, somewhat wealthy, and well-connected politically and socially. He was probably married, but the only extant reference to his wife, in which she tells him not to interact with Jesus after she has had a disturbing dream (Matthew 27:19), is generally dismissed as legendary. According to the cursus honorum established by Augustus for office holders of equestrian rank, Pilate would have had a military command before becoming prefect of Judaea; historian Alexander Demandt speculates that this could have been with a legion stationed at the Rhine or Danube. Although it is therefore likely Pilate served in the military, it is nevertheless not certain.

=== Role as governor of Judea ===
Map of the province of Judaea during Pilate's governorship in the first century

Pilate was the fifth governor of the Roman province of Judaea, during the reign of the emperor Tiberius. The post of governor of Judaea was of relatively low prestige and nothing is known of how Pilate obtained the office. Josephus states that Pilate governed for ten years (Antiquities of the Jews 18.4.2), and these are traditionally dated from 26 to 36/37, making him one of the two longest-serving governors of the province. As Tiberius had retired to the island of Capri in 26, scholars such as E. Stauffer have argued that Pilate may have actually been appointed by the powerful Praetorian Prefect Sejanus, who was executed for treason in 31. Other scholars have cast doubt on any link between Pilate and Sejanus. Daniel R. Schwartz and Kenneth Lönnqvist both argue that the traditional dating of the beginning of Pilate's governorship is based on an error in Josephus; Schwartz argues that he was appointed instead in 19, while Lönnqvist argues for 17/18. These proposed dates have not been widely accepted by other scholars.

Pilate's title of prefect (Note: Pilate's title as governor, as attested on the Pilate stone, is "prefect of Judaea" (praefectus Iudaeae). His title is given as procurator in Tacitus, and with the Greek equivalent epitropos (ἐπίτροπος) in Josephus and Philo. The title prefect was later changed to "procurator" under the emperor Claudius, explaining why later sources give Pilate this title. The New Testament uses the generic Greek term hegemon (ἡγεμών), a term also applied to Pilate in Josephus.) implies that his duties were primarily military; however, Pilate's troops were meant more as a police than a military force, and Pilate's duties extended beyond military matters. As Roman governor, he was head of the judicial system. He had the power to inflict capital punishment, and was responsible for collecting tributes and taxes, and for disbursing funds, including the minting of coins. Because the Romans allowed a certain degree of local control, Pilate shared a limited amount of civil and religious power with the Jewish Sanhedrin.

Pilate was subordinate to the legate of Syria; however, for the first six years in which he held office, Syria's legate Lucius Aelius Lamia was absent from the region, something which Helen Bond believes may have presented difficulties to Pilate. He seems to have been free to govern the province as he wished, with intervention by the legate of Syria only coming at the end of his tenure, after the appointment of Lucius Vitellius to the post in 35. Like other Roman governors of Judaea, Pilate made his primary residence in Caesarea, going to Jerusalem mainly for major feasts to maintain order. He also would have toured around the province in order to hear cases and administer justice.

As governor, Pilate had the right to appoint the Jewish High Priest and also officially controlled the vestments of the High Priest in the Antonia Fortress. Unlike his predecessor, Valerius Gratus, Pilate retained the same high priest, Joseph ben Caiaphas, for his entire tenure. Caiaphas would be removed following Pilate's own removal from the governorship. This indicates that Caiaphas and the priests of the Sadducee sect were reliable allies to Pilate. Moreover, Maier argues that Pilate could not have used the temple treasury to construct an aqueduct, as recorded by Josephus, without the cooperation of the priests. Similarly, Helen Bond argues that Pilate is depicted working closely with the Jewish authorities in the execution of Jesus. Jean-Pierre Lémonon argues that official cooperation with Pilate was limited to the Sadducees, noting that the Pharisees are absent from the gospel accounts of Jesus's arrest and trial.

Daniel Schwartz takes the note in the Gospel of Luke (Luke 23:12) that Pilate had a difficult relationship with the Galilean Jewish king Herod Antipas as potentially historical. He also finds historical the information that their relationship mended following the execution of Jesus. Based on John 19:12, it is possible that Pilate held the title "friend of Caesar" (Latin: amicus Caesaris, Ancient Greek: φίλος τοῦ Kαίσαρος), a title also held by the Jewish kings Herod Agrippa I and Herod Agrippa II and by close advisors to the emperor. Both Daniel Schwartz and Alexander Demandt do not think this especially likely.

=== Incidents with the Jews ===
Various disturbances during Pilate's governorship are recorded in the sources. In some cases, it is unclear if they may be referring to the same event, and it is difficult to establish a chronology of events for Pilate's rule. Joan Taylor argues that Pilate had a policy of promoting the imperial cult, which may have caused some of the friction with his Jewish subjects. Schwartz suggests that Pilate's entire tenure was characterized by "continued underlying tension between governor and governed, now and again breaking out in brief incidents."

According to Philo's Embassy to Gaius (Embassy to Gaius 38), Pilate offended against Jewish law by bringing golden shields into Jerusalem, and placing them on Herod's Palace. The sons of Herod the Great petitioned him to remove the shields, but Pilate refused. Herod's sons then threatened to petition the emperor, an action which Pilate feared would expose the crimes he had committed in office. He did not prevent their petition. Tiberius received the petition and angrily reprimanded Pilate, ordering him to remove the shields. Helen Bond, Daniel Schwartz, and Warren Carter argue that Philo's portrayal is largely stereotyped and rhetorical, portraying Pilate with the same words as other opponents of Jewish law, while portraying Tiberius as just and supportive of Jewish law. It is unclear why the shields offended against Jewish law: it is likely that they contained an inscription referring to Tiberius as divi Augusti filius (son of divine Augustus). Bond dates the incident to 31, sometime after Sejanus's death in 17 October.

According to Josephus in his The Jewish War (2.9.2) and Antiquities of the Jews (18.3.1), Pilate offended the Jews by moving imperial standards with the image of Caesar into Jerusalem. This resulted in a crowd of Jews surrounding Pilate's house in Caesarea for five days. Pilate then summoned them to an arena, where the Roman soldiers drew their swords. But the Jews showed so little fear of death, that Pilate relented and removed the standards. Bond argues that the fact that Josephus says that Pilate brought in the standards by night, shows that he knew that the images of the emperor would be offensive. She dates this incident to early in Pilate's tenure as governor. Daniel Schwartz and Alexander Demandt both suggest that this incident is in fact identical with "the incident with the shields" reported in Philo's Embassy to Gaius, an identification first made by the early church historian Eusebius. Lémonon, however, argues against this identification.

In another incident recorded in both the Jewish Wars (2.9.4) and the Antiquities of the Jews (18.3.2), Josephus relates that Pilate offended the Jews by using up the temple treasury (korbanos) to pay for a new aqueduct to Jerusalem. When a mob formed while Pilate was visiting Jerusalem, Pilate ordered his troops to beat them with clubs; many perished from the blows or from being trampled by horses, and the mob was dispersed. The dating of the incident is unknown, but Bond argues that it must have occurred between 26 and 30 or 33, based on Josephus's chronology.

The Gospel of Luke mentions in passing Galileans "whose blood Pilate had mingled with their sacrifices" (Luke 13:1). This reference has been variously interpreted as referring to one of the incidents recorded by Josephus, or to an entirely unknown incident. Bond argues that the number of Galileans killed does not seem to have been particularly high. In Bond's view, the reference to "sacrifices" likely means that this incident occurred at Passover at some unknown date. She argues that "[i]t is not only possible but quite likely that Pilate's governorship contained many such brief outbreaks of trouble about which we know nothing. The insurrection in which Barabbas was caught up, if historical, may well be another example."

=== Trial and execution of Jesus ===
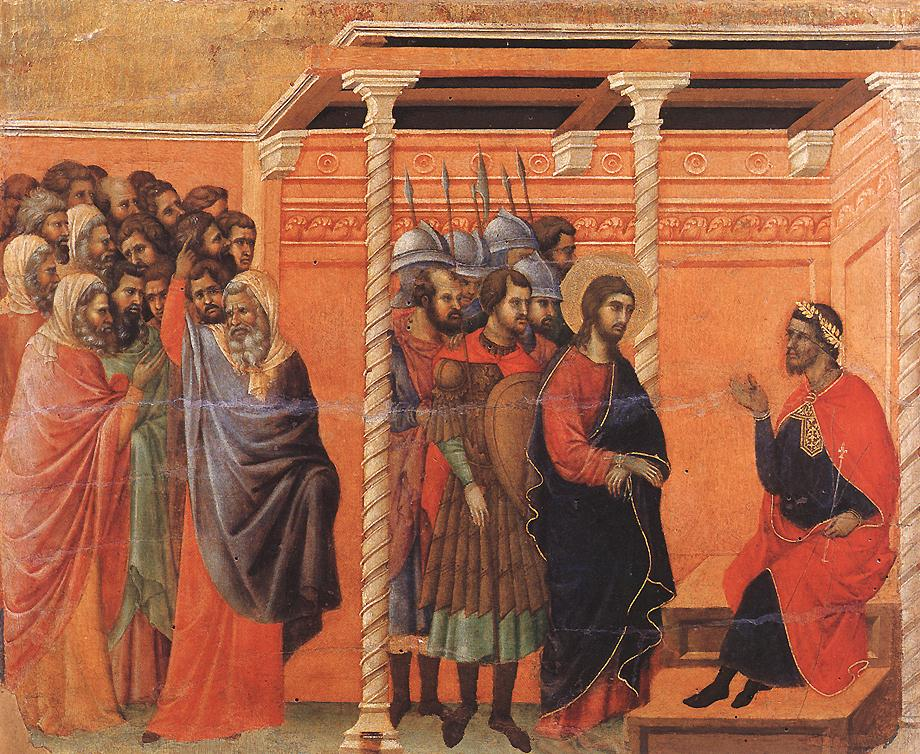
Duccio, Christ before Pilate, c. 1310, from his Maestà in Siena

At the Passover of most likely 30 or 33, Pontius Pilate condemned Jesus of Nazareth to death by crucifixion in Jerusalem. The main sources on the crucifixion are the four canonical Christian Gospels, the accounts of which vary. Helen Bond argues that

the evangelists' portrayals of Pilate have been shaped to a great extent by their own particular theological and apologetic concerns. [...] Legendary or theological additions have also been made to the narrative [...] Despite extensive differences, however, there is a certain agreement amongst the evangelists regarding the basic facts, an agreement which may well go beyond literary dependency and reflect actual historical events.

Pilate's role in condemning Jesus to death is also attested by the Roman historian Tacitus, who, when explaining Nero's persecution of the Christians, explains: "Christus, the founder of the name, had undergone the death penalty in the reign of Tiberius, by sentence of the procurator Pontius Pilate, and the pernicious superstition was checked for a moment..." (Tacitus, Annals 15.44). Josephus also mentioned Jesus's execution by Pilate at the request of prominent Jews (Antiquities of the Jews 18.3.3); the text may have been altered by Christian interpolation, but the reference to the execution is generally considered authentic. Discussing the paucity of extra-biblical mentions of the crucifixion, Alexander Demandt argues that the execution of Jesus was probably not seen as a particularly important event by the Romans, as many other people were crucified at the time and forgotten. In Ignatius's epistles to the Trallians (9.1) and to the Smyrnaeans (1.2), the author attributes Jesus's persecution under Pilate's governorship. Ignatius further dates Jesus's birth, passion, and resurrection during Pilate's governorship in his epistle to the Magnesians (11.1). Ignatius stresses all these events in his epistles as historical facts.

Bond argues that Jesus's arrest was made with Pilate's prior knowledge and involvement, based on the presence of a 500-strong Roman cohort among the party that arrests Jesus in John 18:3. Demandt dismisses the notion that Pilate was involved. It is generally assumed, based on the unanimous testimony of the gospels, that the crime for which Jesus was brought to Pilate and executed was sedition, founded on his claim to be king of the Jews. Pilate may have judged Jesus according to the cognitio extra ordinem, a form of trial for capital punishment used in the Roman provinces and applied to non-Roman citizens that provided the prefect with greater flexibility in handling the case. All four gospels also mention that Pilate had the custom of releasing one captive in honor of the Passover festival; this custom is not attested in any other source. Historians disagree on whether or not such a custom is a fictional element of the gospels, reflects historical reality, or perhaps represents a single amnesty in the year of Jesus's crucifixion.

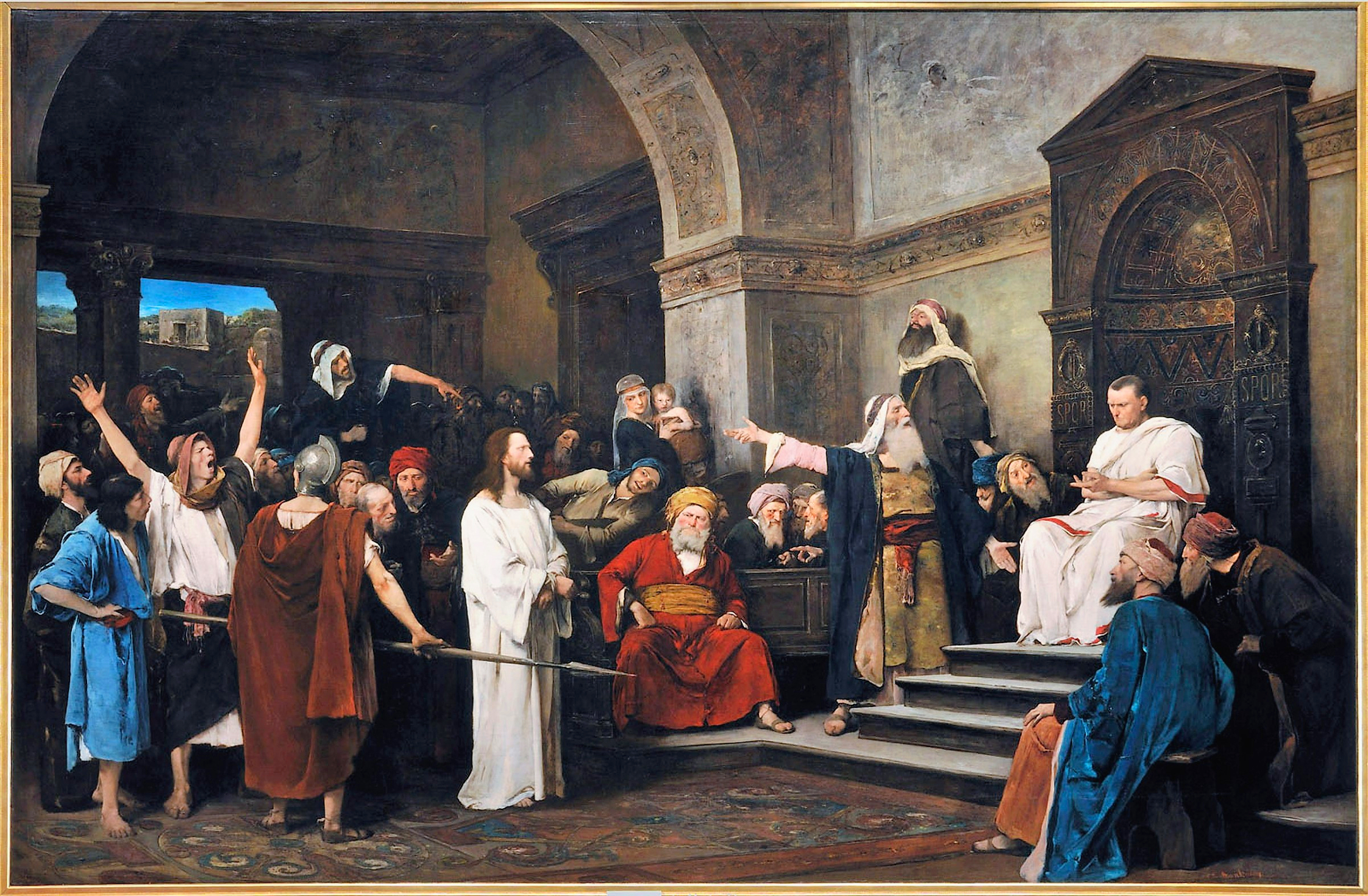
Christ before Pilate, Mihály Munkácsy, 1881

The Gospels' portrayal of Pilate is "widely assumed" to diverge greatly from that found in Josephus and Philo, as Pilate is portrayed as reluctant to execute Jesus and pressured to do so by the crowd and Jewish authorities. John P. Meier notes that in Josephus, by contrast, "Pilate alone [...] is said to condemn Jesus to the cross." Some scholars believe that the Gospel accounts are completely untrustworthy: S. G. F. Brandon argued that in reality, rather than vacillating on condemning Jesus, Pilate unhesitatingly executed him as a rebel. Paul Winter explained the discrepancy between Pilate in other sources and Pilate in the gospels by arguing that Christians became more and more eager to portray Pontius Pilate as a witness to Jesus' innocence, as persecution of Christians by the Roman authorities increased. Bart Ehrman argues that the Gospel of Mark, the earliest one, shows the Jews and Pilate to be in agreement about executing Jesus (Mark 15:15), while the later gospels progressively reduce Pilate's culpability, culminating in Pilate allowing the Jews to crucify Jesus in John (John 19:16). He connects this change to increased "anti-Judaism". Raymond E. Brown argued that the Gospels' portrayal of Pilate cannot be considered historical, since Pilate is always described in other sources (The Jewish War and Antiquities of the Jews of Josephus and Embassy to Gaius of Philo) as a cruel and obstinate man. Brown also rejects the historicity of Pilate washing his hands and of the blood curse, arguing that these narratives, which only appear in the Gospel of Matthew, reflect later contrasts between the Jews and Jewish Christians.

Others have tried to explain Pilate's behavior in the Gospels as motivated by a change of circumstances from that shown in Josephus and Philo, usually presupposing a connection between Pilate's caution and the death of Sejanus. Yet other scholars, such as Brian McGing and Bond, have argued that there is no real discrepancy between Pilate's behavior in Josephus and Philo and that in the Gospels. Warren Carter argues that Pilate is portrayed as skillful, competent, and manipulative of the crowd in Mark, Matthew, and John, only finding Jesus innocent and executing him under pressure in Luke. N. T. Wright and Craig A. Evans argue that Pilate's hesitation was due to the fear of causing a revolt during Passover, when large numbers of pilgrims were in Jerusalem.

=== Removal and later life ===
According to Josephus' Antiquities of the Jews (18.4.1–2), Pilate's removal as governor occurred after Pilate slaughtered a group of armed Samaritans at a village called Tirathana near Mount Gerizim, where they hoped to find artifacts that had been buried there by Moses. Alexander Demandt suggests that the leader of this movement may have been Dositheos, a messiah-like figure among the Samaritans who was known to have been active around this time. The Samaritans, claiming not to have been armed, complained to Lucius Vitellius the Elder, the governor of Syria (term 35–39), who had Pilate recalled to Rome to be judged by Tiberius. Tiberius, however, had died before his arrival. This dates the end of Pilate's governorship to 36/37. Tiberius died in Misenum on 16 March in 37, in his seventy-eighth year (Tacitus, Annals VI.50, VI.51).

Following Tiberius's death, Pilate's hearing would have been handled by the new emperor Caligula: it is unclear whether any hearing took place, as new emperors often dismissed outstanding legal matters from previous reigns. The only sure outcome of Pilate's return to Rome is that he was not reinstated as governor of Judaea, either because the hearing went badly, or because Pilate did not wish to return. J. P. Lémonon argues that the fact that Pilate was not reinstated by Caligula does not mean that his trial went badly, but may simply have been because after ten years in the position it was time for him to take a new posting. Joan Taylor, on the other hand, argues that Pilate seems to have ended his career in disgrace, using his unflattering portrayal in Philo, written only a few years after his dismissal, as proof.

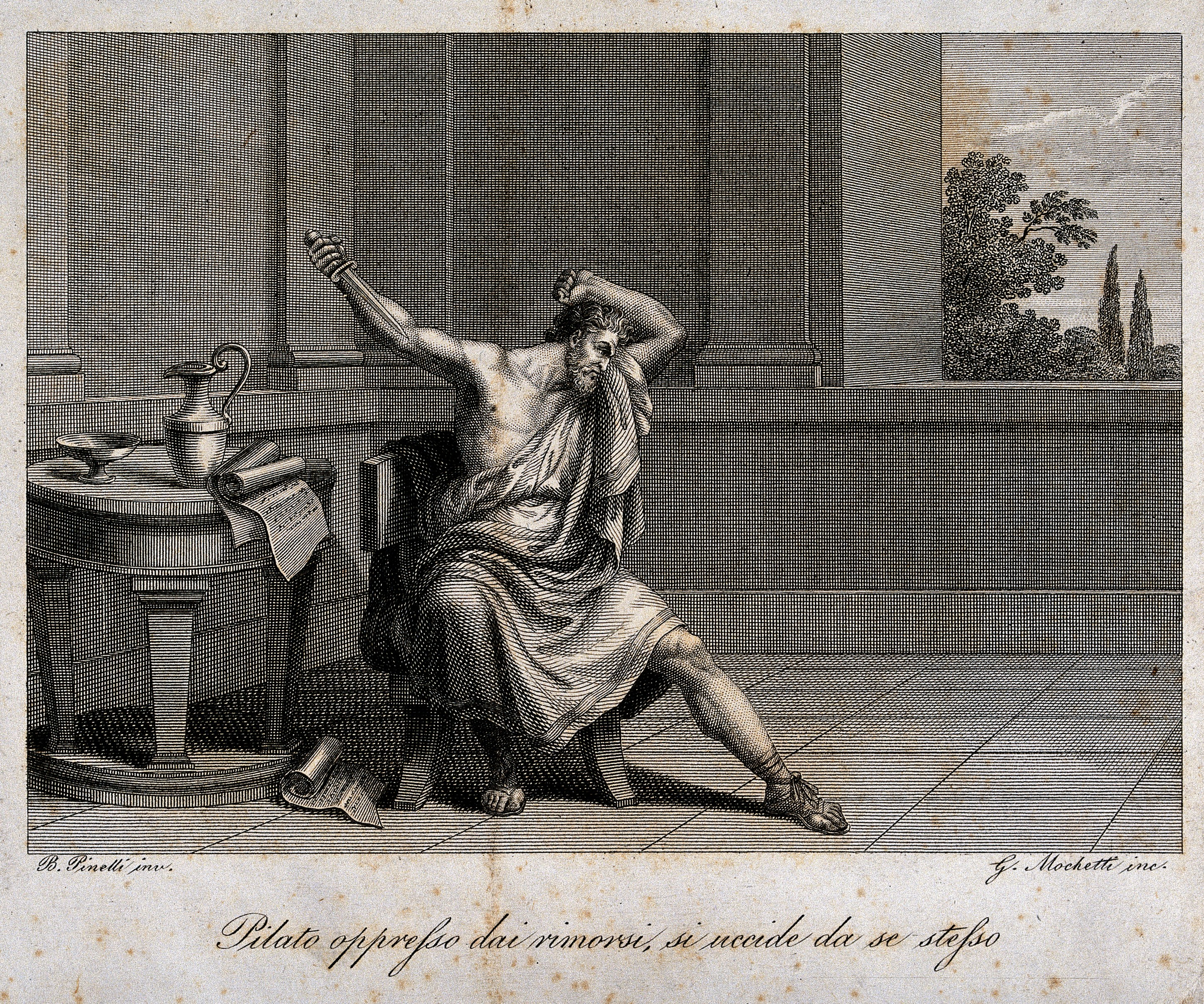
A remorseful Pilate prepares to kill himself. Engraving by G. Mochetti after B. Pinelli, early 19th century.

The church historian Eusebius (Church History 2.7.1), writing in the early fourth century, claims that "tradition relates that" Pilate committed suicide after he was recalled to Rome due to the disgrace he was in. Eusebius dates this to 39. Paul Maier notes that no other surviving records corroborate Pilate's suicide, which is meant to document God's wrath for Pilate's role in the crucifixion, and that Eusebius explicitly states that "tradition" is his source, "indicating that he had trouble documenting Pilate's presumed suicide". Daniel Schwartz, however, argues that Eusebius's claims "should not lightly be dismissed."

More information on the potential fate of Pontius Pilate can be gleaned from other sources. The second-century pagan philosopher Celsus polemically asked why, if Jesus was God, God had not punished Pilate, indicating that he did not believe that Pilate shamefully committed suicide. Responding to Celsus, the Christian apologist Origen, writing c. 248 AD, argued that nothing bad happened to Pilate, because the Jews and not Pilate were responsible for Jesus' death; he therefore also assumed that Pilate did not die a shameful death. Pilate's supposed suicide is also left unmentioned in Josephus, Philo, and Tacitus. Maier argues that "[i]n all probability, then, the fate of Pontius Pilate lay clearly in the direction of a retired government official, a pensioned Roman ex-magistrate, than in anything more disastrous." Taylor notes that Philo discusses Pilate as though he were already dead in the Embassy to Gaius, although he is writing only a few years after Pilate's tenure as governor.

== Archaeology ==
=== Caesarea inscription ===
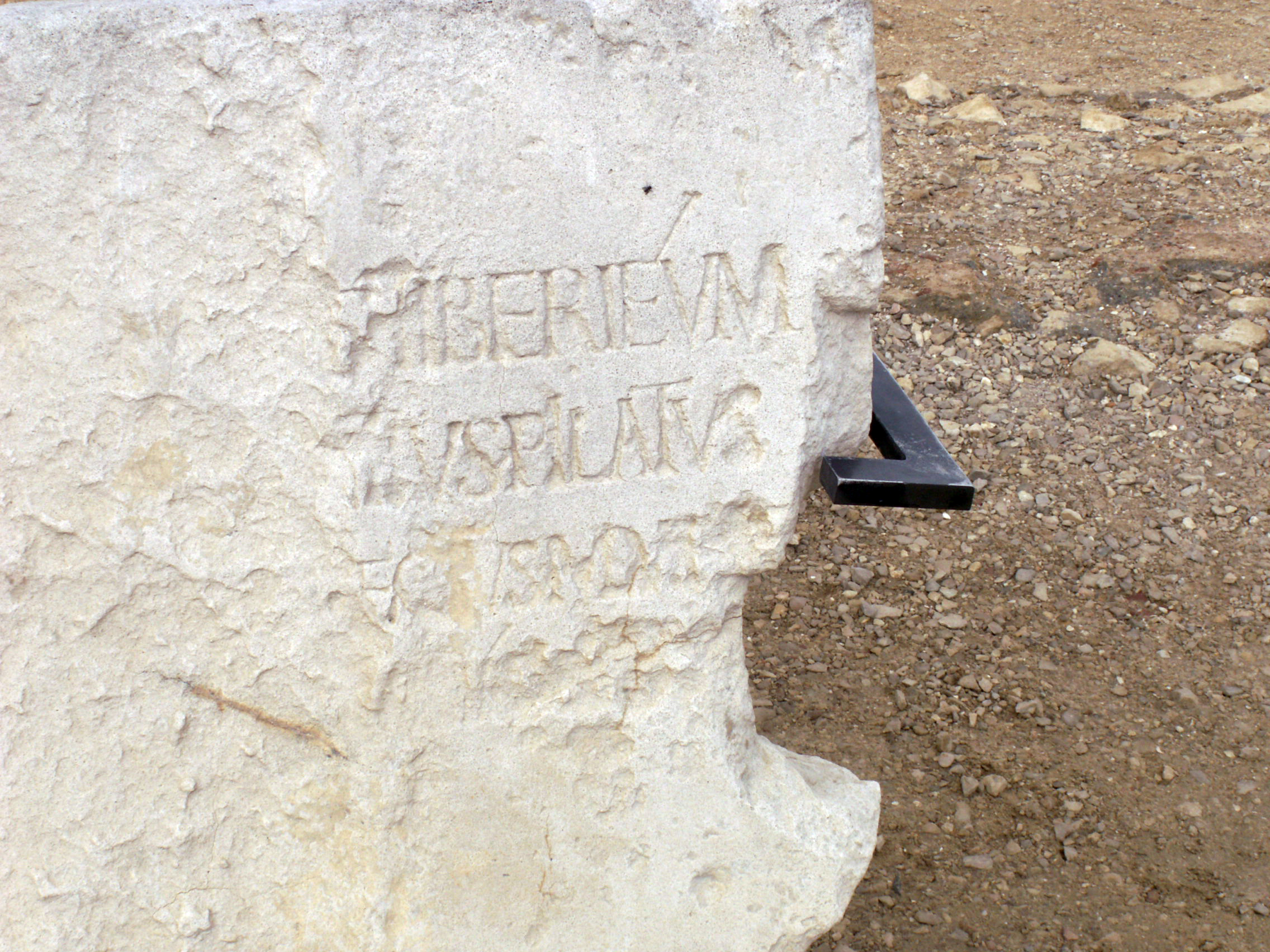
The Pilate Stone. The words [...]TIVS PILATVS[...] can be clearly seen on the second line.

A single inscription by Pilate – the so-called "Pilate Stone" – was found by archaeologists in Caesarea Maritima in 1961. The (partially reconstructed) inscription is as follows:

S TIBERIÉVM
PONTIVS PILATVS
PRAEFECTVS IVDAEAE

Vardaman "freely" translates it as follows: "Tiberium [?of the Caesareans?] Pontius Pilate, Prefect of Judea [ ... has given?]". The fragmentary nature of the inscription has led to some disagreement about the correct reconstruction, so that "apart from Pilate's name and title the inscription is unclear." Originally, the inscription would have included an abbreviated letter for Pilate's praenomen (e.g., T. for Titus or M. for Marcus). The stone attests Pilate's title of prefect and the inscription appears to refer to some kind of building called a Tiberieum, a word otherwise unattested but following a pattern of naming buildings about Roman emperors. Bond argues that we cannot be sure what kind of building this referred to. Géza Alföldy argued that it was some sort of secular building, namely a lighthouse, while Joan Taylor and Jerry Vardaman argue that it was a temple dedicated to Tiberius.

=== Ameria inscription ===
A second inscription, which has since been lost, has historically been associated with Pontius Pilate. It was a fragmentary, undated inscription on a large piece of marble recorded in Ameria, a village in Umbria, Italy. The inscription read as follows:

PILATVS
IIII VIR
QVINQ

(CIL XI.2.1.4396)

The only clear items of text are the names "Pilate" and the title quattuorvir ("IIII VIR"), a type of local city official responsible for conducting a census every five years. The inscription was formerly found outside the church of St. Secundus, where it had been copied from a presumed original. At the turn of the 20th century, it was generally held to be fake, a forgery in support of a local legend that Pontius Pilate died in exile in Ameria. The more recent scholars Alexander Demandt and Henry MacAdam both believe that the inscription is genuine, but attests to a person who simply had the same cognomen as Pontius Pilate. MacAdam argues that "[i]t is far easier to believe that this very fragmentary inscription prompted the legend of Pontius Pilate's association with the Italian village of Ameria [...] than it is to posit someone forging the inscription two centuries ago—quite creatively, it would seem—to provide substance for the legend."

=== Coins ===
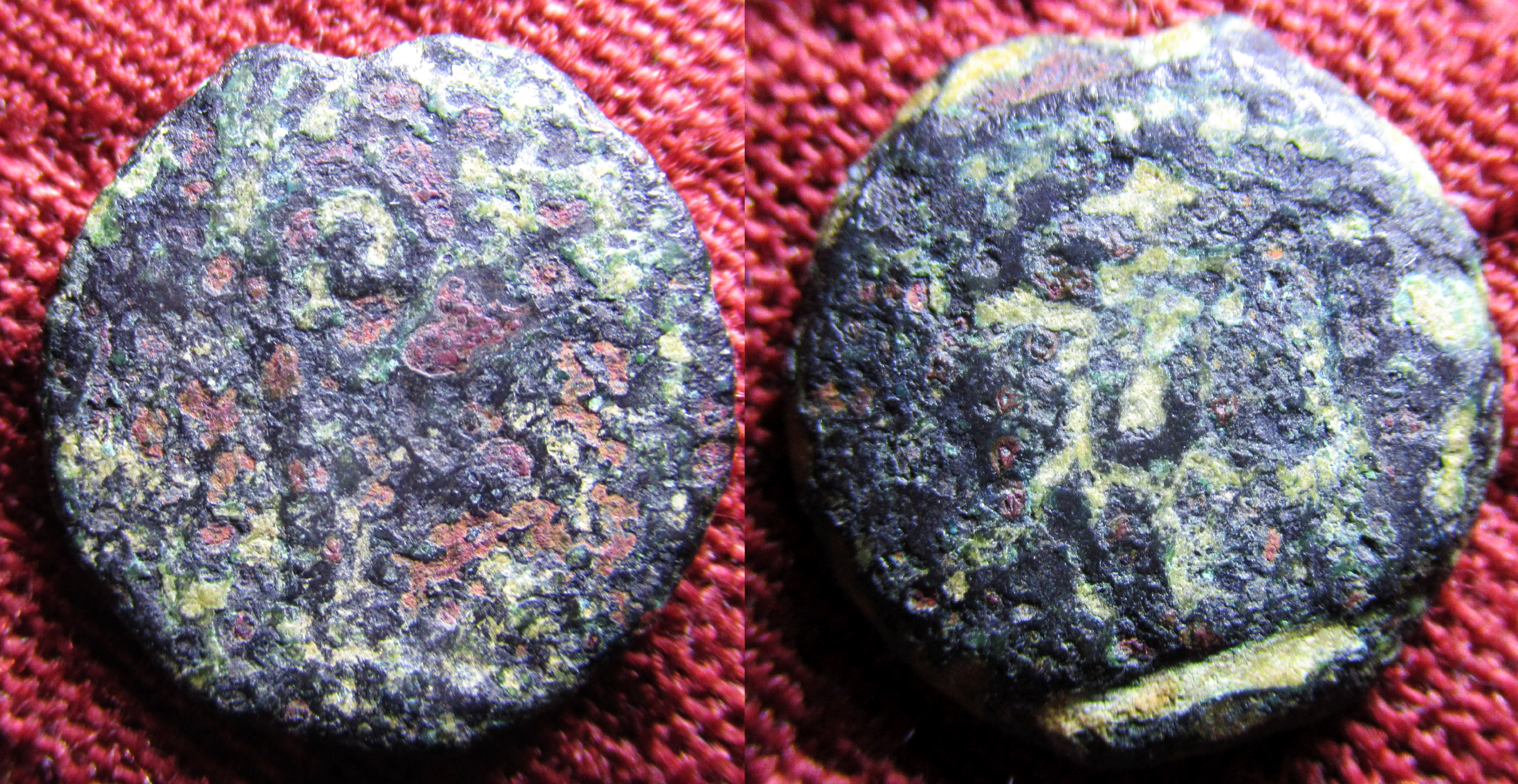
Bronze prutah of Pontius Pilate (worn, clipped, 15mm, 1.97g.). Obverse: ΤΙΒΕΡΙΟΥ ΚΑΙΣΑΡΟΣ surrounding lituus. Reverse: Wreath surrounding date LIϚ (year 16, 29/30 CE). Found in Lebanon.

As governor, Pilate was responsible for minting coins in the province: he appears to have struck them in 29/30, 30/31, and 31/32, thus the fourth, fifth, and sixth years of his governorship. The coins belong to a type called a "perutah", measured between 13.5 and 17mm, were minted in Jerusalem, and are fairly crudely made. Earlier coins read ΙΟΥΛΙΑ ΚΑΙΣΑΡΟΣ on the obverse and ΤΙΒΕΡΙΟΥ ΚΑΙΣΑΡΟΣ on the reverse, referring to the emperor Tiberius and his mother Livia (Julia Augusta). Following Livia's death, the coins only read ΤΙΒΕΡΙΟΥ ΚΑΙΣΑΡΟΣ. As was typical of Roman coins struck in Judaea, they did not have a portrait of the emperor, though they included some pagan designs.

E. Stauffer and E. M. Smallwood argued that the coins' use of pagan symbols was deliberately meant to offend the Jews and connected changes in their design to the fall of the powerful Praetorian prefect Sejanus in 31. This theory was rejected by Helen Bond, who argued that there was nothing particularly offensive about the designs. Joan Taylor has argued that the symbolism on the coins shows how Pilate attempted to promote the Roman imperial cult in Judaea, in spite of local Jewish and Samaritan religious sensitivities.

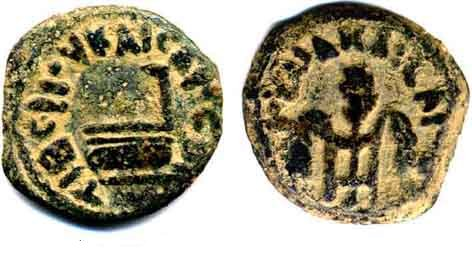
Bronze prutah minted by Pontius Pilate in Jerusalem. Reverse: Greek letters ΤΙΒΕΡΙΟΥ ΚΑΙΣΑΡΟΣ and date LIϚ (year 16 = 29/30), surrounding simpulum. Obverse: Greek letters ΙΟΥΛΙΑ ΚΑΙΣΑΡΟΣ, three bound heads of barley, the outer two heads drooping.

=== Aqueduct ===
Attempts to identify the aqueduct that is attributed to Pilate in Josephus date to the 19th century. In the mid-20th century, A. Mazar tentatively identified it as the Arrub aqueduct that brought water from Solomon's Pools to Jerusalem, an identification supported in 2000 by Kenneth Lönnqvist. Lönnqvist notes that the Talmud (Lamentations Rabbah 4.4) records the destruction of an aqueduct from Solomon's Pools by the Sicarii, a group of fanatical religious Zealots, during the First Jewish-Roman War (66–73); he suggests that if the aqueduct had been funded by the temple treasury as recorded in Josephus, this might explain the Sicarii's targeting of this particular aqueduct. However, more recent research, published in 2021, dates the construction of another one of the aqueducts providing water to Solomon's Pools, namely the Biar Aqueduct (also known as Wadi el-Biyar Aqueduct), to the mid-first century AD, probably during the time of Pilate.

=== Inscribed ring ===
In 2018, an inscription on a thin copper-alloy sealing ring that had been discovered at Herodium was uncovered using modern scanning techniques. The inscription reads ΠΙΛΑΤΟ(Υ) (Pilato(u)), meaning "of Pilate". The name Pilatus is rare, so the ring could be associated with Pontius Pilate; however, given the cheap material, it is unlikely that he would have owned it. It is possible that the ring belonged to another individual named Pilate, or that it belonged to someone who worked for Pontius Pilate.

== Apocryphal texts and legends ==
Due to his role in Jesus' trial, Pilate became an important figure in both pagan and Christian propaganda in late antiquity. Perhaps the earliest apocryphal texts attributed to Pilate are denunciations of Christianity and of Jesus that claim to be Pilate's report on the crucifixion. According to Eusebius (Church History 9.2.5), these texts were distributed during the persecution of Christians conducted by the emperor Maximinus II (reigned 308–313). None of these texts survive, but Tibor Grüll argues that their contents can be reconstructed from Christian apologetic texts.

Positive traditions about Pilate are frequent in much of Eastern Christianity, particularly in Egypt and Ethiopia, whereas negative traditions predominate in Western and Byzantine Christianity. Additionally, earlier Christian traditions portray Pilate more positively than later ones, a change which Ann Wroe suggests reflects the fact that, following the legalization of Christianity in the Roman Empire by the Edict of Milan (312), it was no longer necessary to deflect criticism of Pilate (and by extension of the Roman Empire) for his role in Jesus's crucifixion onto the Jews. Bart Ehrman, on the other hand, argues that the tendency in the Early Church to exonerate Pilate and blame the Jews prior to this time reflects an increasing "anti-Judaism" among Early Christians. The earliest attestation of a positive tradition about Pilate comes from the late first-, early second-century Christian author Tertullian, who, claiming to have seen Pilate's report to Tiberius, states Pilate had "become already a Christian in his conscience." An earlier reference to Pilate's records of Jesus's trial is given by the Christian apologist Justin Martyr around 160. Tibor Grüll believes that this could be a reference to Pilate's actual records, but other scholars argue that Justin has simply invented the records as a source on the assumption that they existed without ever having verified their existence.

=== New Testament Apocrypha ===
Beginning in the fourth century, a large body of Christian apocryphal texts developed concerning Pilate, making up one of the largest groups of surviving New Testament Apocrypha. Originally, these texts served both to unburden Pilate of guilt for the death of Jesus as well as to provide more complete records of Jesus's trial. The apocryphal Gospel of Peter completely exonerates Pilate for the crucifixion, which is instead performed by Herod Antipas. Moreover, the text makes explicit that while Pilate washes his hands of guilt, neither the Jews nor Herod do so. The Gospel includes a scene in which the centurions who had been guarding Jesus' tomb report to Pilate that Jesus has been resurrected.

The fragmentary third-century Manichaean Gospel of Mani has Pilate refer to Jesus as "the Son of God" and telling his centurions to "[k]eep this secret".

In the most common version of the passion narrative in the apocryphal Gospel of Nicodemus (also called the Acts of Pilate), Pilate is portrayed as forced to execute Jesus by the Jews and as distraught at having done so. One version claims to have been discovered and translated by a Jewish convert named Ananias, portraying itself as the official Jewish records of the crucifixion. Another claims that the records were made by Pilate himself, relying on reports made to him by Nicodemus and Joseph of Arimathea. Some Eastern versions of the Gospel of Nicodemus claim that Pilate was born in Egypt, which likely aided his popularity there.

The Christian Pilate literature surrounding the Gospel of Nicodemus includes at least fifteen late antique and early medieval texts, called the "Pilate cycle", written and preserved in various languages and versions and dealing largely with Pontius Pilate. Two of these include purported reports made by Pilate to the emperor (the Anaphora Pilati to Emperor Tiberius and the Letter of Pilate to Claudius) on the crucifixion, in which Pilate recounts Jesus' death and resurrection, blaming the Jews. Another purports to be an angry reply by Tiberius, condemning Pilate for his role in Jesus' death, the Letter of Tiberius to Pilate. Another early text is an apocryphal letter attributed to "Herod" (a composite character of the various Herods in the Bible), which claims to respond to a letter from Pilate in which Pilate spoke of his remorse for Jesus' crucifixion and of having had a vision of the risen Christ; "Herod" asks Pilate to pray for him.

In the so-called Book of the Cock, a late-antique apocryphal passion Gospel only preserved in Ge'ez (Ethiopic) but translated from Arabic, Pilate attempts to avoid Jesus's execution by sending him to Herod and writing further letters arguing with Herod not to execute Jesus. Pilate's family become Christians after Jesus miraculously cures Pilate's daughters of their deaf-muteness. Pilate is nevertheless forced to execute Jesus by the increasingly angry crowd, but Jesus tells Pilate that he does not hold him responsible. This book enjoys "a quasi-canonical status" among Ethiopian Christians to this day and continues to be read beside the canonical gospels during Holy Week.

==== Pilate's death in the apocrypha ====
Seven of the Pilate texts mention Pilate's fate after the crucifixion: in three, he becomes a very positive figure, while in four he is presented as diabolically evil. A fifth-century Syriac version of the Acts of Pilate explains Pilate's conversion as occurring after he has blamed the Jews for Jesus' death in front of Tiberius; prior to his execution, Pilate prays to God and converts, thereby becoming a Christian martyr. In the Greek Paradosis Pilati (5th century), Pilate is arrested for the crime of executing Jesus, although he has since converted to be a follower of Christ. His beheading is accompanied by a voice from heaven calling him blessed and saying he will be with Jesus at the Second Coming. The Evangelium Gamalielis, possibly of medieval origin and preserved in Arabic, Coptic, and Ge'ez, says Jesus was crucified by Herod, whereas Pilate was a true believer in Christ who was martyred for his faith; similarly, the Martyrium Pilati, possibly medieval and preserved in Arabic, Coptic, and Ge'ez, portrays Pilate, as well as his wife and two children, as being crucified twice, once by the Jews and once by Tiberius, for his faith.

In addition to the report on Pilate's suicide in Eusebius, Grüll notes three Western apocryphal traditions about Pilate's suicide. In the Cura sanitatis Tiberii (dated variously 5th to 7th century), the emperor Tiberius is healed by an image of Jesus brought by Saint Veronica, Saint Peter then confirms Pilate's report on Jesus's miracles, and Pilate is exiled by the emperor Nero, after which he commits suicide. A similar narrative plays out in the Vindicta Salvatoris (8th century). In the Mors Pilati (perhaps originally 6th century, but recorded c. 1300 AD), Pilate was forced to commit suicide and his body thrown in the Tiber. However, the body is surrounded by demons and storms, so that it is removed from the Tiber and instead cast into the Rhone, where the same thing happens. Finally, the corpse is taken to Lausanne in modern Switzerland and buried in an isolated lake (perhaps Lake Lucerne), where demonic visitations continue to occur.

=== Later legends ===
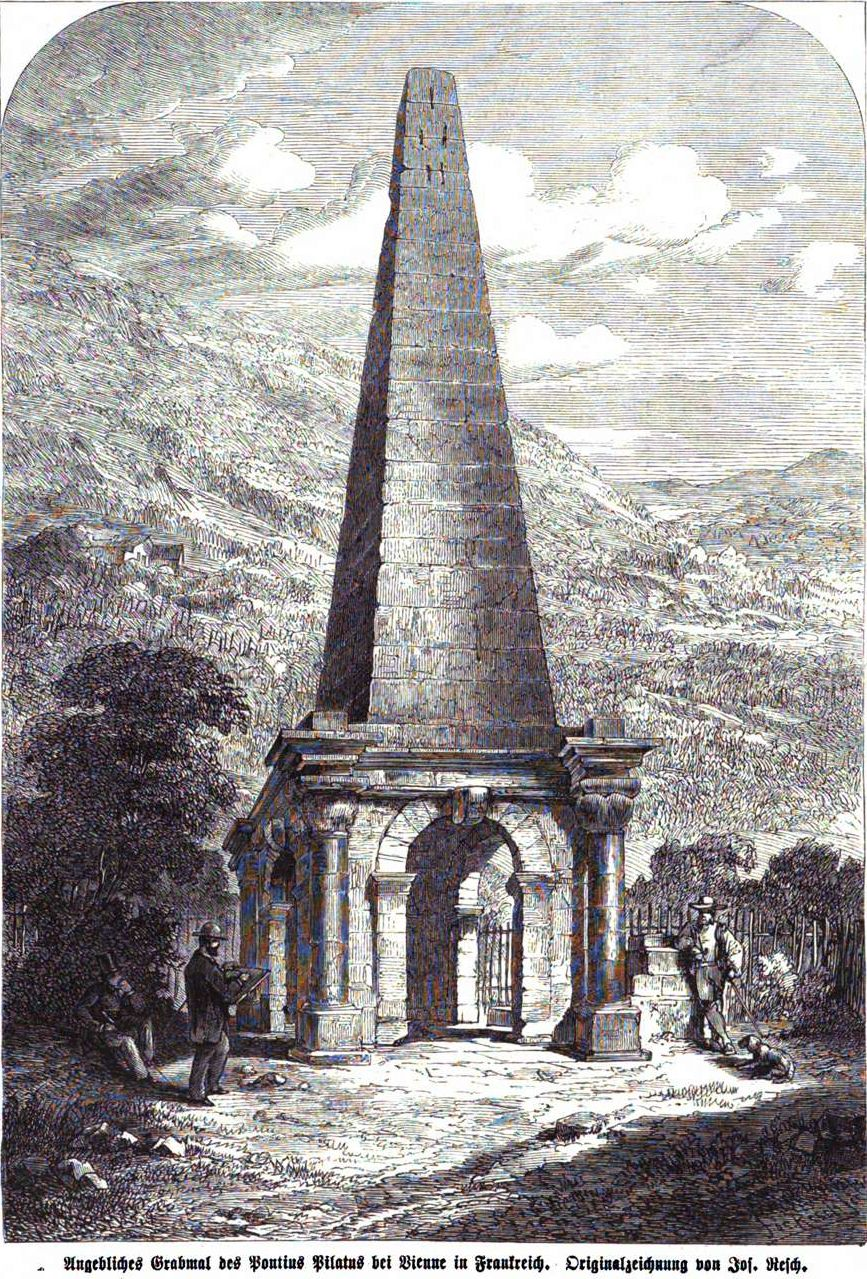
19th-century lithograph of the supposed tomb of Pontius Pilate in Vienne, France. In fact, it is a decorated spina from a Roman circus.

Beginning in the eleventh century, more extensive legendary biographies of Pilate were written in Western Europe, adding details to information provided by the Bible and Apocrypha. The legend exists in many different versions and was extremely widespread in both Latin and the vernacular, and each version contains significant variation, often relating to local traditions.

==== Early "biographies" ====
The earliest extant legendary biography is the De Pilato of c. 1050, with three further Latin versions appearing in the mid-twelfth century, followed by many vernacular translations. Howard Martin summarizes the general content of these legendary biographies as follows: a king who was skilled in astrology and named Atus lived in Mainz. The king reads in the stars that he will bear a son who will rule over many lands, so he has a miller's daughter named Pila brought to him whom he impregnates; Pilate's name thus results from the combination of the names Pila with Atus.

A few years later, Pilate is brought to his father's court where he kills his half-brother. As a result, he is sent as a hostage to Rome, where he kills another hostage. As punishment he is sent to the island of Pontius, whose inhabitants he subjugates, thus acquiring the name Pontius Pilate. King Herod hears of this accomplishment and asks him to come to Palestine to aid his rule there; Pilate comes but soon usurps Herod's power.

The trial and judgment of Jesus then happens as in the gospels. The emperor in Rome is suffering from a terrible disease at this time, and hearing of Christ's healing powers, sends for him only to learn from Saint Veronica that Christ has been crucified, but she possesses a cloth with the image of his face. Pilate is taken as a prisoner with her to Rome to be judged, but every time the emperor sees Pilate to condemn him, his anger dissipates. This is revealed to be because Pilate is wearing Jesus's coat; when the coat is removed, the Emperor condemns him to death, but Pilate commits suicide first. The body is first thrown in the Tiber, but because it causes storms it is then moved to Vienne, and then thrown in a lake in the high Alps.

One important version of the Pilate legend is found in the Golden Legend by Jacobus de Voragine (1263–1273 AD), one of the most popular books of the later Middle Ages. In the Golden Legend, Pilate is portrayed as closely associated with Judas, first coveting the fruit in the orchard of Judas's father Ruben, then granting Judas Ruben's property after Judas has killed his own father.

==== Western Europe ====
Several places in Western Europe have traditions associated with Pilate. The cities of Lyon and Vienne in modern France claim to be Pilate's birthplace: Vienne has a Maison de Pilate, a Prétoire de Pilate and a Tour de Pilate. One tradition states that Pilate was banished to Vienne where a Roman ruin is associated with his tomb; according to another, Pilate took refuge in a mountain (now called Mount Pilatus) in modern Switzerland, before eventually committing suicide in a lake on its summit. This connection to Mount Pilatus is attested from 1273 AD onwards, while Lake Lucerne has been called "Pilatus-See" (Pilate Lake) beginning in the fourteenth century. A number of traditions also connected Pilate to Germany. In addition to Mainz, Bamberg, Hausen, Upper Franconia were also claimed to be his place of birth, while some traditions place his death in the Saarland.

The town of Tarragona in modern Spain possesses a first-century Roman tower, which, since the eighteenth-century, has been called the "Torre del Pilatos", in which Pilate is claimed to have spent his last years. The tradition may go back to a misread Latin inscription on the tower. The cities of Huesca and Seville are other cities in Spain associated with Pilate. Per a local legend, the village of Fortingall in Scotland claims to be Pilate's birthplace, but this is almost certainly a 19th-century invention—particularly as the Romans did not invade the British Isles until 43.

==== Eastern Christianity ====
Pilate was also the subject of legends in Eastern Christianity. The Byzantine chronicler George Kedrenos (c. 1100) wrote that Pilate was condemned by Caligula to die by being left in the sun enclosed in the skin of a freshly slaughtered cow, together with a chicken, a snake, and a monkey. In a legend from medieval Rus', Pilate attempts to save Saint Stephen from being executed; Pilate, his wife and children have themselves baptized and bury Stephen in a gilded silver coffin. Pilate builds a church in the honor of Stephen, Gamaliel, and Nicodemus, who were martyred with Stephen. Pilate dies seven months later. In the medieval Slavonic Josephus, an Old Church Slavonic translation of Josephus, with legendary additions, Pilate kills many of Jesus's followers but finds Jesus innocent. After Jesus heals Pilate's wife of a fatal illness, the Jews bribe Pilate with 30 talents to crucify Jesus.

== Art, literature, and film ==
=== Visual art ===
==== Late antique and early medieval art ====
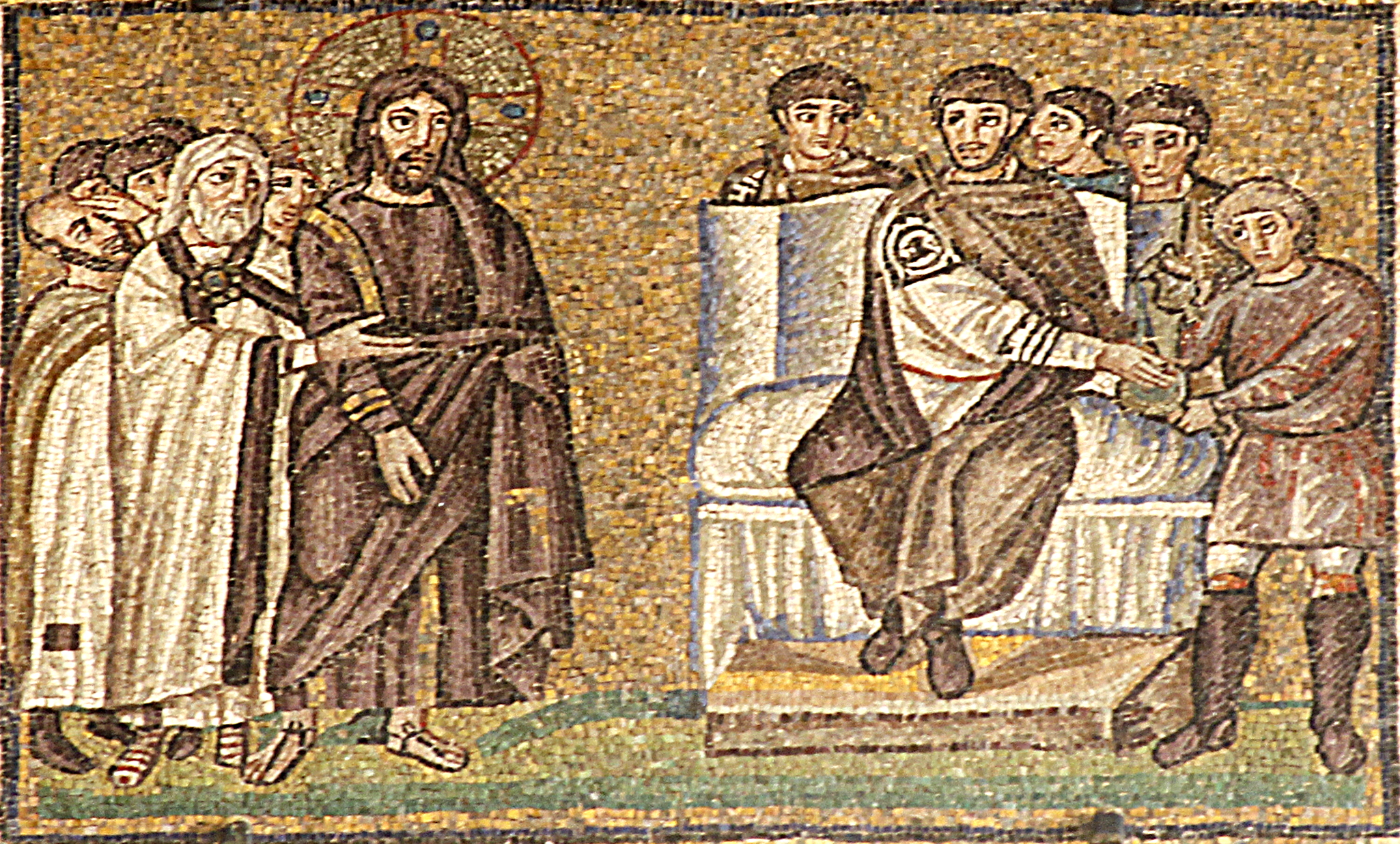
Mosaic of Christ before Pilate, Basilica of Sant'Apollinare Nuovo in Ravenna, early sixth century. Pilate washes his hands in a bowl held by a figure on the right.

Pilate is one of the most important figures in early Christian art; he is often given greater prominence than Jesus himself. He is, however, entirely absent from the earliest Christian art; all images postdate the emperor Constantine and can be classified as early Byzantine art. Pilate first appears in art on a Christian sarcophagus in 330 AD; in the earliest depictions he is shown washing his hands without Jesus being present. In later images he is typically shown washing his hands of guilt in Jesus' presence. 44 depictions of Pilate predate the sixth century and are found on ivory, in mosaics, in manuscripts as well as on sarcophagi. Pilate's iconography as a seated Roman judge derives from depictions of the Roman emperor, causing him to take on various attributes of an emperor or king, including the raised seat and clothing.

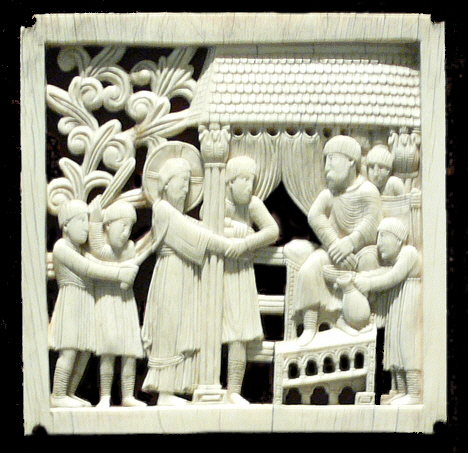
Panel from the Magdeburg Ivories depicting Pilate at the Flagellation of Christ, German, tenth century

The older Byzantine model of depicting Pilate washing his hands continues to appear on artwork into the tenth century; beginning in the seventh century, however, a new iconography of Pilate also emerges, which does not always show him washing his hands, includes him in additional scenes, and is based on contemporary medieval rather than Roman models. The majority of depictions from this time period come from France or Germany, belonging to Carolingian or later Ottonian art, and are mostly on ivory, with some in frescoes, but no longer on sculpture except in Ireland. New images of Pilate that appear in this period include depictions of the Ecce homo, Pilate's presentation of the scourged Jesus to the crowd in John 19:5, as well as scenes deriving from the apocryphal Acts of Pilate. Pilate also comes to feature in scenes such as the Flagellation of Christ, where he is not mentioned in the Bible.

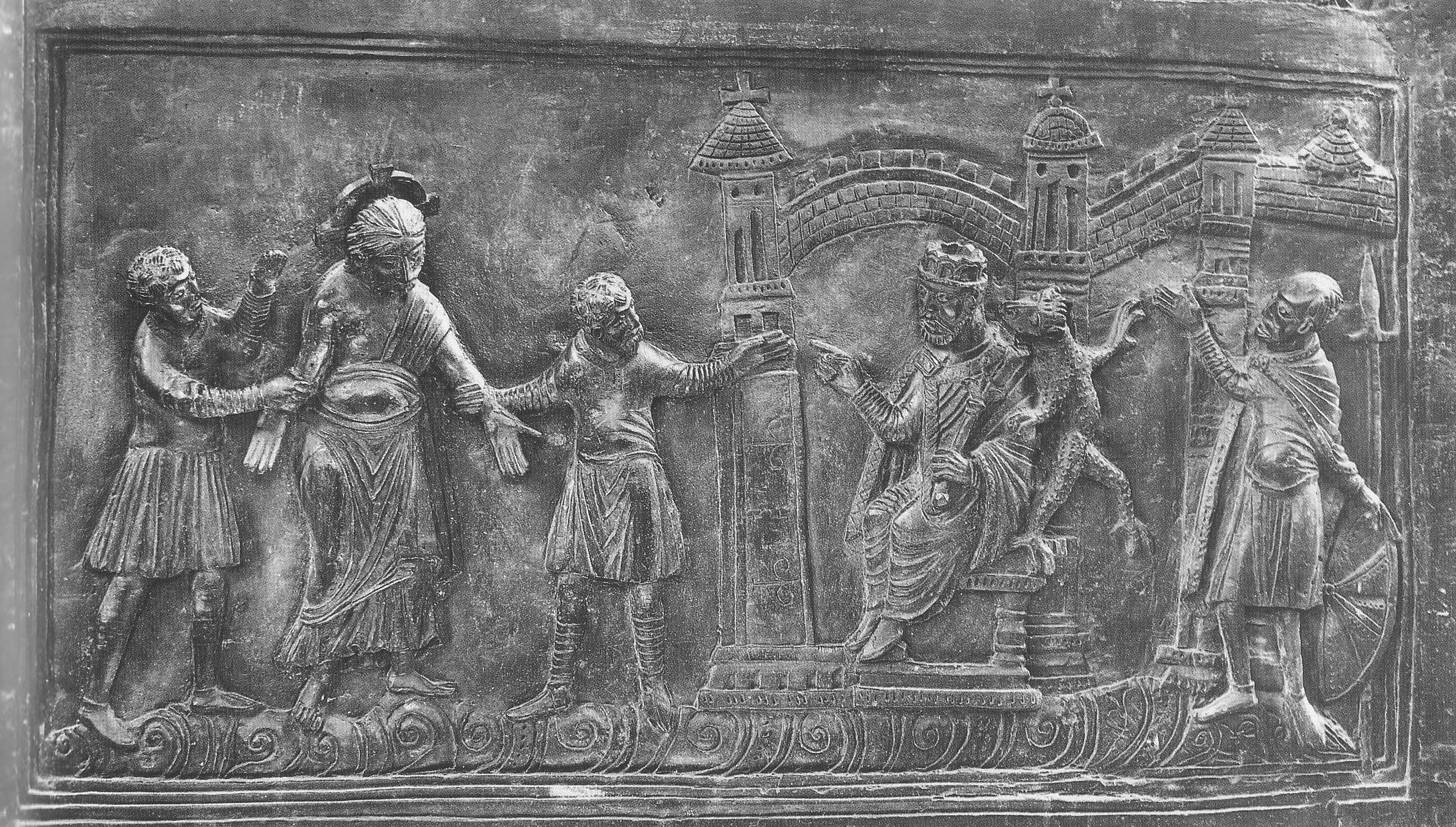
Christ before Pilate on the Hildesheim cathedral doors (1015). A devil whispers in Pilate's ear as he judges Jesus.

The eleventh century sees Pilate iconography spread from France and Germany to Great Britain and further into the eastern Mediterranean. Images of Pilate are found on new materials such as metal, while he appeared less frequently on ivory, and continues to be a frequent subject of gospel and psalter manuscript illuminations. Depictions continue to be greatly influenced by the Acts of Pilate, and the number of situations in which Pilate is depicted also increases. From the eleventh century onward, Pilate is frequently represented as a Jewish king, wearing a beard and a Jewish hat. In many depictions he is no longer depicted washing his hands, or is depicted washing his hands but not in the presence of Jesus, or else he is depicted in passion scenes in which the Bible does not mention him.

Despite being venerated as a saint by in the Ethiopian Churches, very few images of Pilate exist in these traditions from any time period.

==== High and late medieval and renaissance art ====
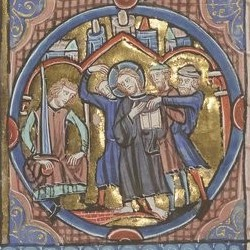
A depiction of Christ before Pilate, from a thirteenth-century Bible moralisée

In the thirteenth century, depictions of the events of Christ's passion came to dominate all visual art forms—these depictions of the "Passion cycle" do not always include Pilate, but they often do so; when he is included, he is often given stereotyped Jewish features. One of the earliest examples of Pilate rendered as a Jew is from the eleventh century on the Hildesheim cathedral doors (see image, above right). This is the first known usage of the motif of Pilate being influenced and corrupted by the Devil in medieval art. Pilate is typically represented in fourteen different scenes from his life; however, more than half of all thirteenth-century representations of Pilate show the trial of Jesus. Pilate also comes to be frequently depicted as present at the crucifixion, by the fifteenth century being a standard element of depiction of the crucifixion. While many images still draw from the Acts of Pilate, the Golden Legend of Jacobus de Voragine is the primary source for depictions of Pilate from the second half of the thirteenth century onward. Pilate now frequently appears in illuminations for books of hours, as well as in the richly illuminated Bibles moralisées, which include many biographical scenes adopted from the legendary material, although Pilate's washing of hands remains the most frequently depicted scene. In the Bible moralisée, Pilate is generally depicted as a Jew. In many other images, however, he is depicted as a king or with a mixture of attributes of a Jew and a king.

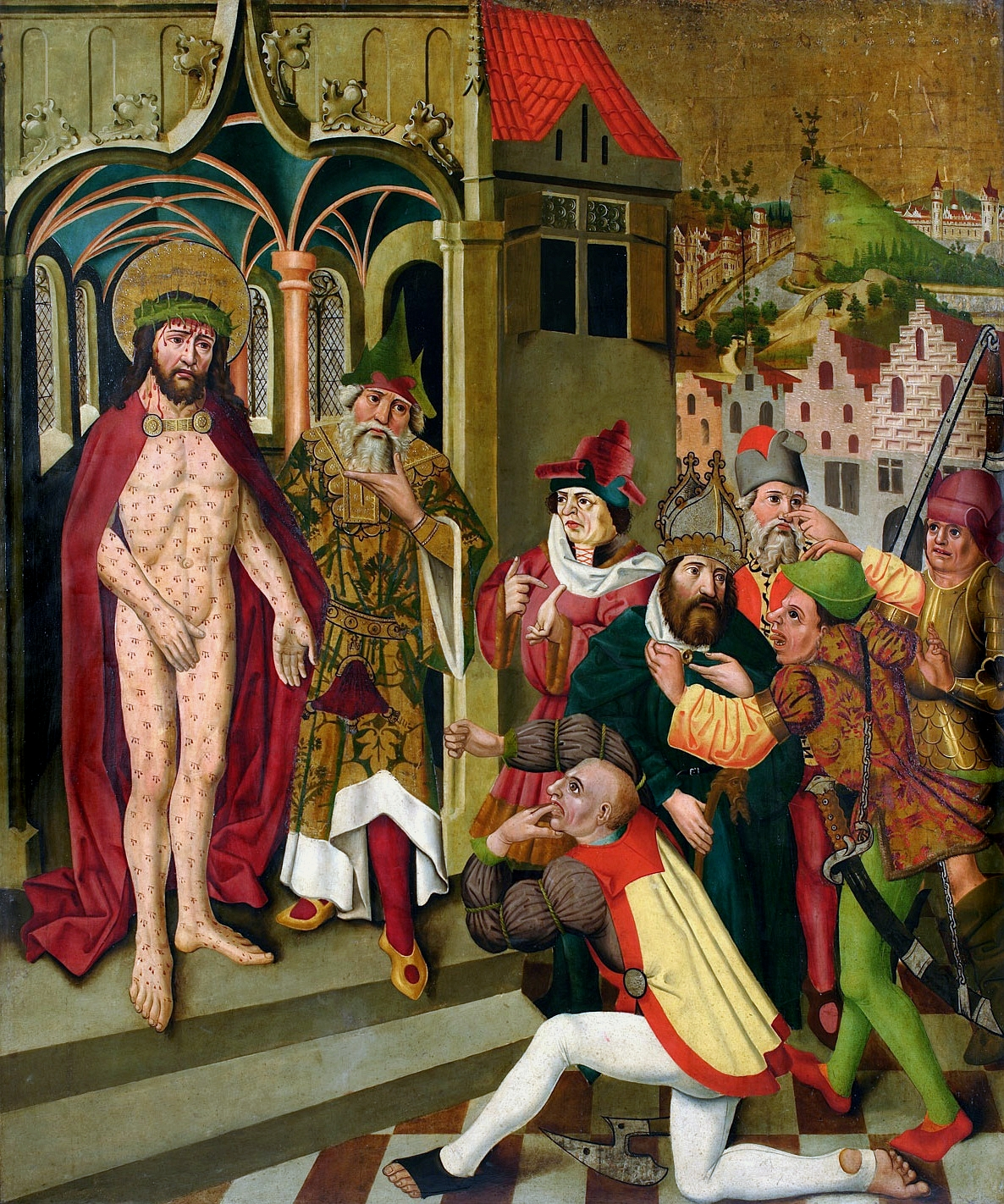
Ecce Homo from the Legnica Polyptych by Nikolaus Obilman, Silesia, 1466, Pilate stands beside Christ in a Jewish hat and golden robes.

The fourteenth and fifteenth centuries see fewer depictions of Pilate, although he generally appears in cycles of artwork on the passion. He is sometimes replaced by Herod, Annas, and Caiaphas in the trial scene. Depictions of Pilate in this period are mostly found in private devotional settings such as on ivory or in books; he is also a major subject in a number of panel-paintings, mostly German, and frescoes, mostly Scandinavian. The most frequent scene to include Pilate is his washing of his hands; Pilate is typically portrayed similarly to the high priests as an old, bearded man, often wearing a Jewish hat but sometimes a crown, and typically carrying a scepter. Images of Pilate were especially popular in Italy, where, however, he was almost always portrayed as a Roman, and often appears in the new medium of large-scale church paintings. Pilate continued to be represented in various manuscript picture bibles and devotional works as well, often with innovative iconography, sometimes depicting scenes from the Pilate legends. Many, mostly German, engravings and woodcuts of Pilate were created in the fifteenth century. Images of Pilate were printed in the Biblia pauperum ("Bibles of the Poor"), picture bibles focusing on the life of Christ, as well as the Speculum Humanae Salvationis ("Mirror of Human Salvation"), which continued to be printed into the sixteenth century.

==== Post-medieval art ====
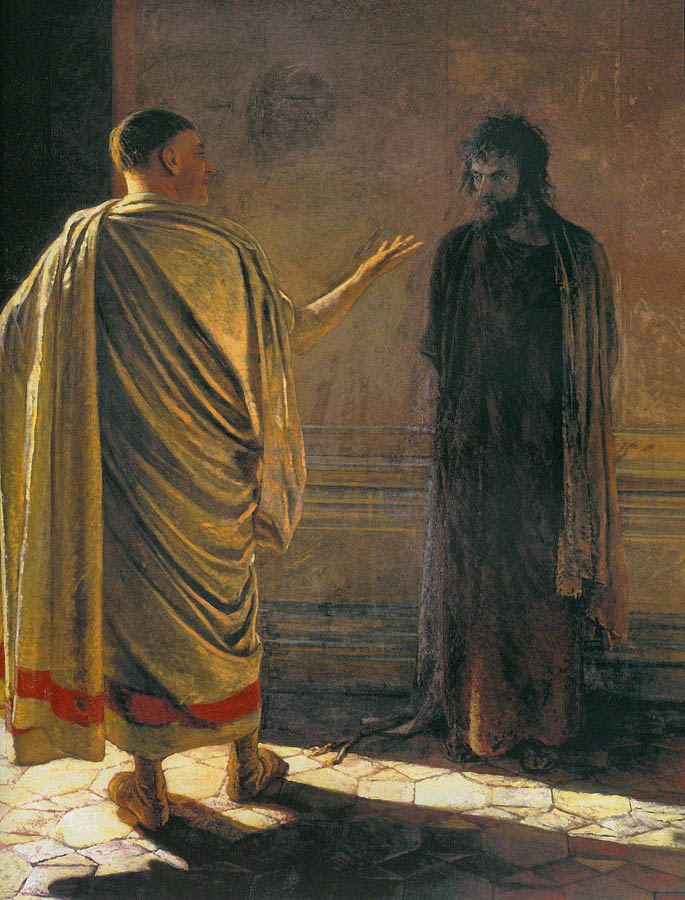
Nikolai Ge, What is truth?, 1890

After the Middle Ages, depictions of Pilate become less frequent, though depictions are still made of his encounter with Jesus, especially in prints. In the sixteenth and seventeenth centuries, Pilate was frequently dressed as a Turk or Asian of no specific culture, wearing a turban, long robes, and a long beard, given the same characteristics as the Jews. Notable paintings of this era include Tintoretto's Christ before Pilate (1566/67), in which Pilate is given the forehead of a philosopher, and Gerrit van Honthorst's 1617 Christ before Pilate, which was later recatalogued as Christ before the High Priest due to Pilate's Jewish appearance.

Following this longer period in which few depictions of Pilate were made, the increased religiosity, and artistic productivity, of the mid-nineteenth century caused a slew of new depictions of Pontius Pilate to be created, now depicted as a Roman. In 1830, J. M. W. Turner painted Pilate Washing His Hands, in which the governor himself is not visible, but rather only the back of his chair, with lamenting women in the foreground. One famous nineteenth-century painting of Pilate is Christ before Pilate (1881) by the Hungarian painter Mihály Munkácsy: the work brought Munkácsy great fame and celebrity in his lifetime, making his reputation and being popular in the United States in particular, where the painting was purchased. In 1896, Munkácsy painted a second painting featuring Christ and Pilate, Ecce homo, which however was never exhibited in the United States; both paintings portray Jesus's fate as in the hands of the crowd rather than Pilate.

The "most famous of nineteenth-century pictures" of Pilate is What is truth? (Что есть истина?) by the Russian painter Nikolai Ge, which was completed in 1890; the painting was banned from exhibition in Russia in part because the figure of Pilate was identified as representing the tsarist authorities. In 1893, Ge painted another painting, Golgotha, in which Pilate is represented only by his commanding hand, sentencing Jesus to death. The Scala sancta, supposedly the staircase from Pilate's praetorium, now located in Rome, is flanked by a life-sized sculpture of Christ and Pilate in the Ecce homo scene made in the nineteenth century by the Italian sculptor Ignazio Jacometti.

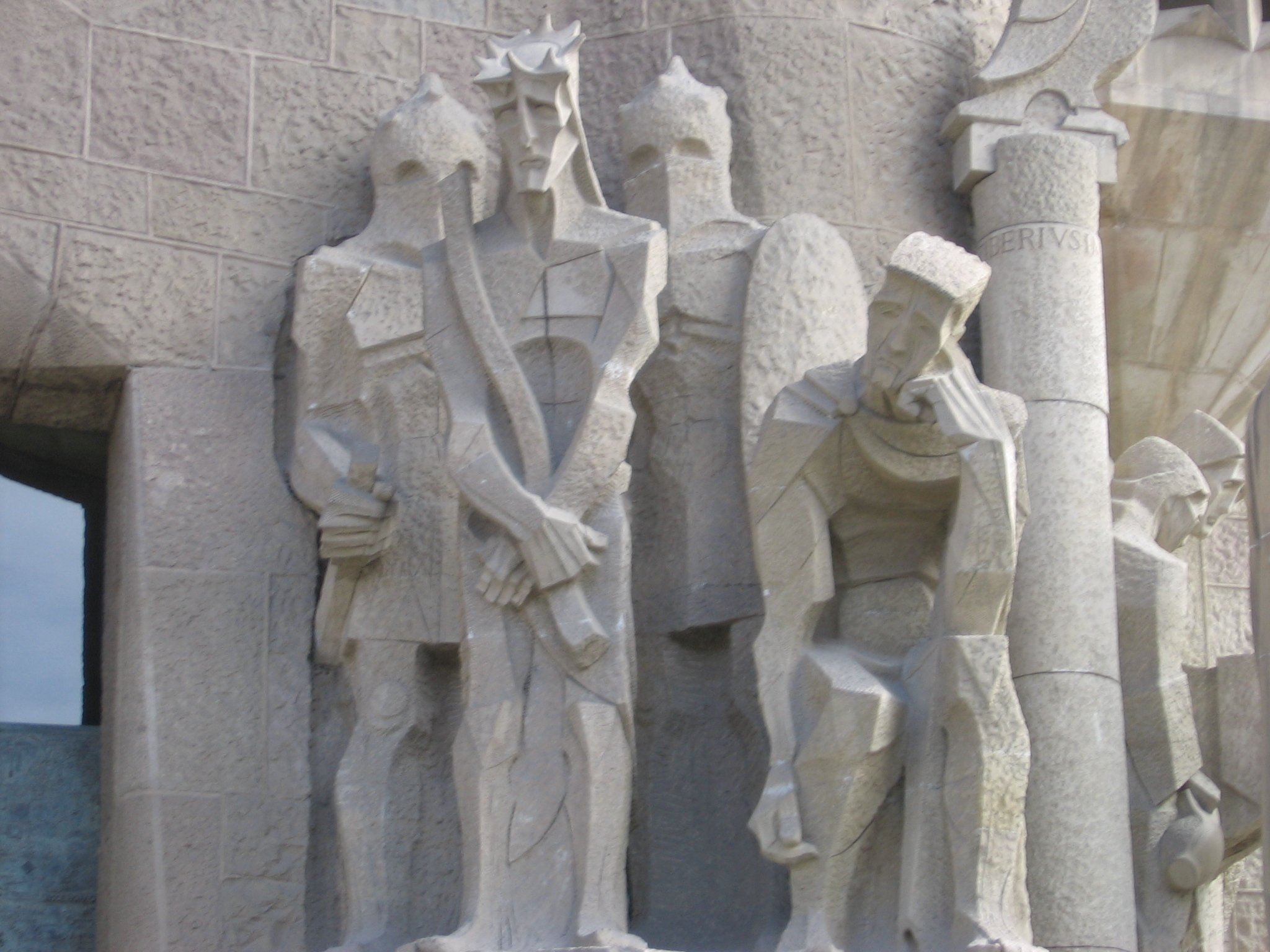
Ecce Homo by Subirachs from Basilica of the Sagrada Familia in Barcelona

The image of Pilate condemning Jesus to death is commonly encountered today as the first scene of the Stations of the Cross, first found in Franciscan Catholic churches in the seventeenth century and found in almost all Catholic churches since the nineteenth century.

=== Medieval plays ===
Pilate plays a major role in the medieval passion play. He is frequently depicted as a more important character to the narrative than even Jesus, and became one of the most important figures of medieval drama in the fifteenth century. The three most popular scenes in the plays to include Pilate are his washing of hands, the warning of his wife Procula not to harm Jesus, and the writing of the titulus on Jesus' cross. Pilate's characterization varies greatly from play to play, but later plays frequently portray Pilate somewhat ambiguously, though he is usually a negative character, and sometimes an evil villain. While in some plays Pilate is opposed to the Jews and condemns them, in others he describes himself as a Jew or supports their wish to kill Christ.

In the passion plays from the continental Western Europe, Pilate's characterization varies from good to evil, but he is mostly a benign figure. The earliest surviving passion play, the thirteenth-century Ludus de Passione from Klosterneuburg, portrays Pilate as a weak administrator who succumbs to the whims of the Jews in having Christ crucified. Pilate goes on to play an important role in the increasingly long and elaborate passion plays performed in the German-speaking countries and in France. In Arnoul Gréban's fifteenth-century Passion, Pilate instructs the flagellators on how best to whip Jesus. The 1517 Alsfelder Passionsspiel portrays Pilate as condemning Christ to death out of fear of losing Herod's friendship and to earn the Jews' good will, despite his long dialogues with the Jews in which he professes Christ's innocence. He eventually becomes a Christian himself. In the 1493 Frankfurter Passionsspiel, on the other hand, Pilate himself accuses Christ. The fifteenth-century German Benediktbeuern passion play depicts Pilate as a good friend of Herod's, kissing him in a reminiscence of the kiss of Judas. Colum Hourihane argues that all of these plays supported antisemitic tropes and were written at times when persecution of Jews on the continent were high.

The fifteenth-century Roman Passione depicts Pilate as trying to save Jesus against the wishes of the Jews. In the Italian passion plays, Pilate never identifies himself as a Jew, condemning them in the fifteenth-century Resurrezione and stressing the Jews' fear of the "new law" of Christ.

Hourihane argues that in England, where the Jews had been expelled in 1290 AD, Pilate's characterization may have been used primarily to satirize corrupt officials and judges rather than to stoke antisemitism. In several English plays, Pilate is portrayed speaking French or Latin, the languages of the ruling classes and the law. In the Wakefield plays, Pilate is portrayed as wickedly evil, describing himself as Satan's agent (mali actoris) while plotting Christ's torture so as to extract the most pain. He nonetheless washes his hands of guilt after the tortures have been administered. In the fifteenth-century English Townley Cycle, Pilate is portrayed as a pompous lord and prince of the Jews, but also as forcing Christ's torturer to give him Christ's clothes at the foot of the cross. It is he alone who wishes to kill Christ rather than the high priests, conspiring together with Judas.

In the fifteenth-century English York passion play, Pilate judges Jesus together with Annas and Caiaphas, becoming a central character of the passion narrative who converses with and instructs other characters. In this play, when Judas comes back to Pilate and the priests to tell them he no longer wishes to betray Jesus, Pilate browbeats Judas into going through with the plan. Not only does Pilate force Judas to betray Christ, he double-crosses him and refuses to take him on as a servant once Judas has done so. Moreover, Pilate also swindles his way into possession of the Potter's field, thus owning the land on which Judas commits suicide. In the York passion cycle, Pilate describes himself as a courtier, but in most English passion plays he proclaims his royal ancestry. The actor who portrayed Pilate in the English plays would typically speak loudly and authoritatively, a fact which was parodied in Geoffrey Chaucer's Canterbury Tales.

The fifteenth century also sees Pilate as a character in plays based on legendary material: one, La Vengeance de Nostre-Seigneur, exists in two dramatic treatments focusing on the horrible fates that befell Christ's tormenters: it portrays Pilate being tied to a pillar, covered with oil and honey, and then slowly dismembered over 21 days; he is carefully tended to so that he does not die until the end. Another play focusing on Pilate's death is Cornish and based on the Mors Pilati. The Mystère de la Passion d'Angers by Jean Michel includes legendary scenes of Pilate's life before the passion.

=== Modern literature ===
Pontius Pilate appears as a character in a large number of literary works, typically as a character in the judgment of Christ. One of the earliest literary works in which he plays a large role is French writer Anatole France's 1892 short story "Le Procurateur de Judée" ("The Procurator of Judaea"), which portrays an elderly Pilate who has been banished to Sicily. There he lives happily as a farmer and is looked after by his daughter, but suffers from gout and obesity and broods over his time as governor of Judaea. Spending his time at the baths of Baiae, Pilate is unable to remember Jesus at all.

Pilate makes a brief appearance in the preface to George Bernard Shaw's 1933 play On the Rocks where he argues against Jesus about the dangers of revolution and of new ideas. Shortly afterwards, French writer Roger Caillois wrote a novel Pontius Pilate (1936), in which Pilate acquits Jesus.

Pilate features prominently in Russian author Mikhail Bulgakov's novel The Master and Margarita, which was written in the 1930s but only published in 1966, twenty-six years after the author's death. Henry I. MacAdam describes it as "the 'cult classic' of Pilate-related fiction." The work features a novel within the novel about Pontius Pilate and his encounter with Jesus (Yeshu Ha-Notsri) by an author only called the Master. Because of this subject matter, the Master has been attacked for "Pilatism" by the Soviet literary establishment. Five chapters of the novel are featured as chapters of The Master and Margarita. In them, Pilate is portrayed as wishing to save Jesus, being affected by his charisma, but as too cowardly to do so. Russian critics in the 1960s interpreted this Pilate as "a model of the spineless provincial bureaucrats of Stalinist Russia." Pilate becomes obsessed with his guilt for having killed Jesus. Because he betrayed his desire to follow his morality and free Jesus, Pilate must suffer for eternity. Pilate's burden of guilt is finally lifted by the Master when he encounters him at the end of Bulgakov's novel.

The majority of literary texts about Pilate come from the time after the Second World War, a fact which Alexander Demandt suggests shows a cultural dissatisfaction with Pilate having washed his hands of guilt. One of Swiss writer Friedrich Dürrenmatt's earliest stories ("Pilatus," 1949) portrays Pilate as aware that he is torturing God in the trial of Jesus. Swiss playwright Max Frisch's comedy Die chinesische Mauer portrays Pilate as a skeptical intellectual who refuses to take responsibility for the suffering he has caused. The German Catholic novelist Gertrud von Le Fort's Die Frau des Pilatus portrays Pilate's wife as converting to Christianity after attempting to save Jesus and assuming Pilate's guilt for herself; Pilate executes her as well.

In 1986, Soviet-Kyrgyz writer Chingiz Aitmatov published a novel in Russian featuring Pilate titled Plakha (The Place of the Skull). The novel centers on an extended dialogue between Pilate and Jesus witnessed in a vision by the narrator Avdii Kallistratov, a former seminarian. Pilate is presented as a materialist pessimist who believes mankind will soon destroy itself, whereas Jesus offers a message of hope. Among other topics, the two anachronistically discuss the meaning of the last judgment and the second coming; Pilate fails to comprehend Jesus's teachings and is complacent as he sends him to his death.

=== Film ===
Pilate has been depicted in a number of films, being included in portrayals of Christ's passion already in some of the earliest films produced. In the 1927 silent film The King of Kings, Pilate is played by Hungarian-American actor Victor Varconi, who is introduced seated under an enormous 37 feet high Roman eagle, which Christopher McDonough argues symbolizes "not power that he possesses but power that possesses him". During the Ecce homo scene, the eagle stands in the background between Jesus and Pilate, with a wing above each figure; after hesitantly condemning Jesus, Pilate passes back to the eagle, which is now framed beside him, showing his isolation in his decision and, McDonough suggests, causing the audience to question how well he has served the emperor.

The film The Last Days of Pompeii (1935) portrays Pilate as "a representative of the gross materialism of the Roman empire", with the actor Basil Rathbone giving him long fingers and a long nose. Following the Second World War, Pilate and the Romans often take on a villainous role in American film. The 1953 film The Robe portrays Pilate as completely covered with gold and rings as a sign of Roman decadence. The 1959 film Ben-Hur shows Pilate (the Australian actor, Frank Thring Jr.) presiding over a chariot race, in a scene that Ann Wroe says "seemed closely modeled on the Hitler footage of the 1936 Olympics," with Pilate bored and sneering. Martin Winkler, however, argues that Ben-Hur provides a more nuanced and less condemnatory portrayal of Pilate and the Roman Empire than most American films of the period.

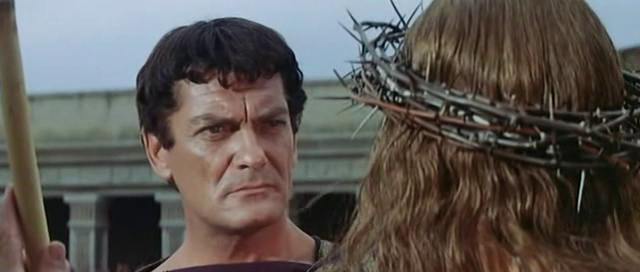
Jean Marais as Pontius Pilate in Ponzio Pilato (1962)

Only one film has been made entirely from Pilate's perspective, the 1962 French-Italian Ponzio Pilato, in which Pilate is played by Jean Marais. In the 1973 film Jesus Christ Superstar, based on the 1970 rock opera, the trial of Jesus takes place in the ruins of a Roman theater, suggesting the collapse of Roman authority and "the collapse of all authority, political or otherwise". The Pilate in the film, played by Barry Dennen, expands on John 18:38 to question Jesus on the truth and appears, in McDonough's view, as "an anxious representative of [...] moral relativism". Speaking of Dennen's portrayal in the trial scene, McDonough describes him as a "cornered animal."

Ann Wroe argues that later Pilates took on a sort of effeminacy, illustrated by Michael Palin's Pilate in Monty Python's Life of Brian, who lisps and mispronounces his Rs as Ws. In Martin Scorsese's The Last Temptation of Christ (1988), Pilate is played by David Bowie, who appears as "gaunt and eerily hermaphrodite." Bowie's Pilate speaks with a British accent, contrasting with the American accent of Jesus (Willem Dafoe). The trial takes place in Pilate's private stables, implying that Pilate does not think the judgment of Jesus very important, and no attempt is made to take any responsibility from Pilate for Jesus's death, which he orders without any qualms.

Mel Gibson's 2004 film The Passion of the Christ portrays Pilate, played by Hristo Shopov, as a sympathetic, noble-minded character, fearful that the Jewish priest Caiaphas will start an uprising if he does not give in to his demands. He expresses disgust at the Jewish authorities' treatment of Jesus when Jesus is brought before him and offers Jesus a drink of water. McDonough argues that "Shopov gives us a very subtle Pilate, one who manages to appear alarmed though not panicked before the crowd, but who betrays far greater misgivings in private conversation with his wife."

== Legacy ==
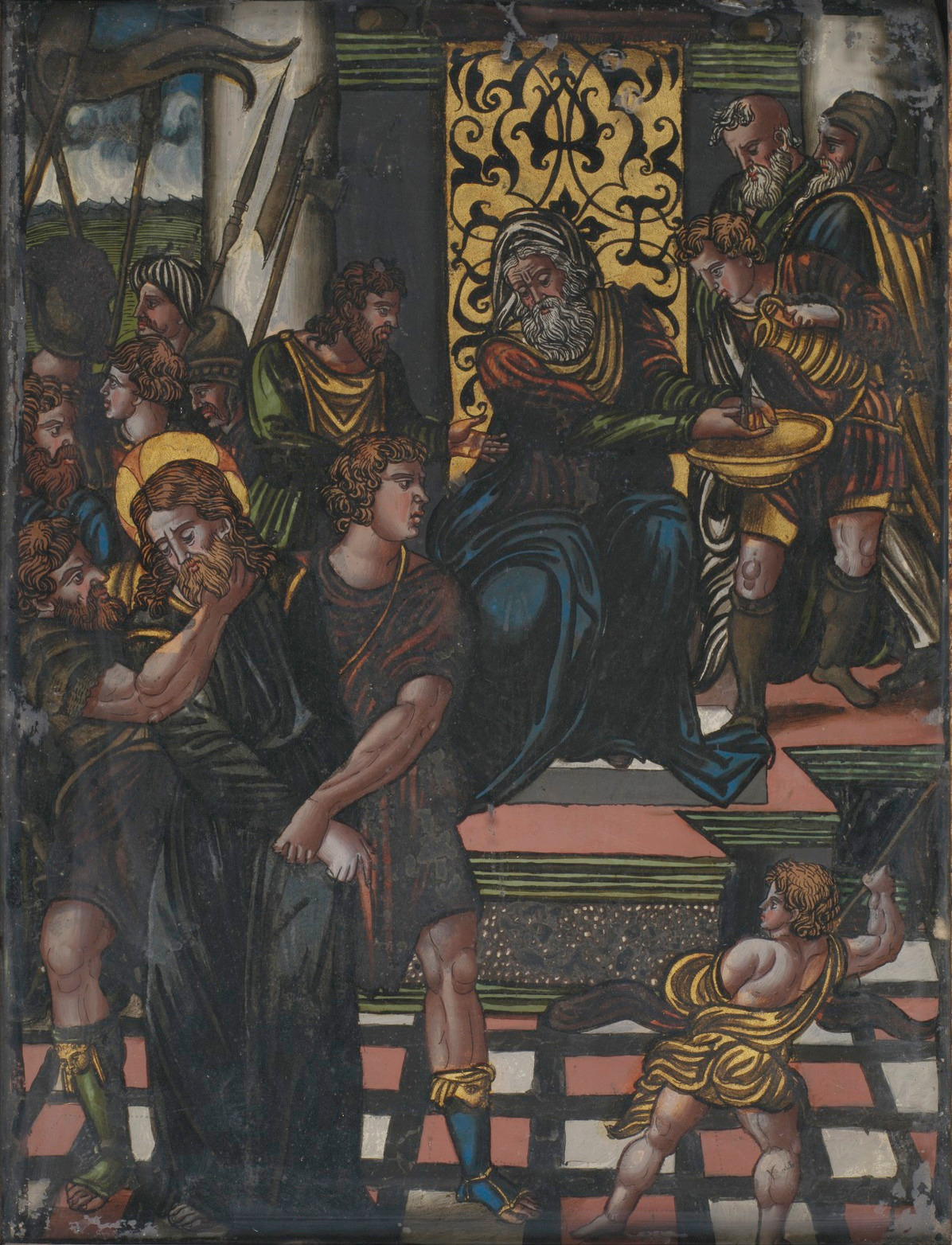
Christ before Pilate, 16th–17th century

Pontius Pilate is mentioned as having been involved in the crucifixion in both the Nicene Creed and the Apostles Creed. The Apostles Creed states that Jesus "suffered under Pontius Pilate, was crucified, died, and was buried." The Nicene Creed states "For our sake [Jesus] was crucified under Pontius Pilate; he suffered death and was buried." These creeds are recited weekly by many Christians. Pilate is the only person besides Jesus and Mary mentioned by name in the creeds. The mention of Pilate in the creeds serves to mark the passion as a historical event.

He is venerated as a saint by the Ethiopian Church with a feast day on 19 June, and while he featured as a saint and martyr in late antique Coptic apocryphal literature, he is not recognized as a saint in the official Coptic Church's calendar.

Pilate's washing his hands of responsibility for Jesus's death in Matthew 27:24 is a commonly encountered image in the popular imagination, and is the origin of the English phrase "to wash one's hands of (the matter)", meaning to refuse further involvement with or responsibility for something. Parts of the dialogue attributed to Pilate in the Gospel of John have become particularly famous sayings, especially quoted in the Latin version of the Vulgate. These include John 18:35 (numquid ego Iudaeus sum? "Am I a Jew?"), John 18:38 (Quid est veritas?; "What is truth?"), John 19:5 (Ecce homo, "Behold the man!"), John 19:14 (Ecce rex vester, "Behold your king!"), and John 19:22 (Quod scripsi, scripsi, "What I have written, I have written").

The Gospels' deflection of responsibility for Jesus's crucifixion from Pilate to the Jews has been blamed for fomenting antisemitism from the Middle Ages through the nineteenth and twentieth centuries.

=== Scholarly assessments ===
The main ancient sources on Pilate offer very different views on his governorship and personality. Philo is hostile, Josephus mostly neutral, and the Gospels "comparatively friendly." This, combined with the general lack of information on Pilate's long time in office, has resulted in a wide range of assessments by modern scholars.

On the basis of the many offenses that Pilate caused to the Judaean populace, some scholars find Pilate to have been a particularly bad governor. M. P. Charlesworth argues that Pilate was "a man whose character and capacity fell below those of the ordinary provincial official [...] in ten years he had piled blunder on blunder in his scorn for and misunderstanding of the people he was sent to rule." However, Paul Maier argues that Pilate's long term as governor of Judaea indicates he must have been a reasonably competent administrator, while Henry MacAdam argues that "[a]mong the Judaean governors prior to the Jewish War, Pilate must be ranked as more capable than most." Other scholars have argued that Pilate was simply culturally insensitive in his interactions with the Jews and in this way a typical Roman official.

Beginning with E. Stauffer in 1948, some scholars have argued, on the basis of his possible appointment by Sejanus, that Pilate's offenses against the Jews were directed by Sejanus out of hatred of the Jews and a desire to destroy their nation, a theory supported by the pagan imagery on Pilate's coins. According to this theory, following Sejanus's execution in 31 AD and Tiberius's purges of his supporters, Pilate, fearful of being removed himself, became far more cautious, explaining his apparently weak and vacillating attitude at the trial of Jesus. Helen Bond argues that "[g]iven the history of pagan designs throughout Judaean coinage, particularly from Herod and Gratus, Pilate's coins do not seem to be deliberately offensive," and that the coins offer little evidence of any connection between Pilate and Sejanus. Carter notes this theory arose in the context of the aftermath of the Holocaust, that the evidence that Sejanus was anti-Semitic depends entirely on Philo, and that "[m]ost scholars have not been convinced that it is an accurate or a fair picture of Pilate."

== See also ==
- List of biblical figures identified in extra-biblical sources

== Bibliography ==
- Amora-Stark, Shua; et al. (2018). "An Inscribed Copper-Alloy Finger Ring from Herodium Depicting a Krater". Israel Exploration Journal. 68 (2): 208–220.
- Ash, Rhiannon, ed. (2018). Tacitus Annals. Book XV. Cambridge, UK: Cambridge University Press. ISBN 978-1-107-00978-3.
- Bayes, Jonathan F. (2010). The Apostles' Creed: Truth with Passion. Wipf and Stock Publishers. ISBN 978-1-60899-539-4.
- Bond, Helen K. (1996). "The Coins of Pontius Pilate: Part of an Attempt to Provoke the People or to Integrate them into the Empire?". Journal for the Study of Judaism in the Persian, Hellenistic, and Roman Period. 27 (3): 241–262. doi:10.1163/157006396X00076. JSTOR 24660068.
- Bond, Helen K. (1998). Pontius Pilate in History and Interpretation. Cambridge University Press. ISBN 0-521-63114-9.
- Bormann, Eugen, ed. (1901). Corpus Inscriptionum Latinarum XI.2.1: Inscriptiones Aemiliae, Etruriae, Umbriae, Latinae. Berlin: G. Reimer.
- Burke, Paul F. (2018). "Saint Pilate and the Conversion of Tiberius". In English, Mary C.; Fratantuono, Lee (eds.). Pushing the boundaries of Historia. London and New York: Routledge. pp. 264–268. ISBN 978-1-138-04632-0.
- Carter, Warren (2003). Pontius Pilate: Portraits of a Roman Governor. Collegeville, Mn.: Liturgical Press. ISBN 0-8146-5113-5.
- Demandt, Alexander (1999). Hände in Unschuld: Pontius Pilatus in der Geschichte. Cologne, Weimar, Vienna: Böhlau. ISBN 3-412-01799-X.
- Demandt, Alexander (2012). Pontius Pilatus. Munich: C. H. Beck. ISBN 978-3-406-63362-1.
- Dilley, Paul C. (2010). "The Invention of Christian Tradition: "Apocrypha," Imperial Policy, and Anti-Jewish Propaganda". Greek, Roman, and Byzantine Studies. 50 (4): 586–615.
- Ehrman, Bart D. (2003). Lost Christianities: The Battles for Scripture and the Faiths We Never Knew. Oxford and New York: Oxford University Press. ISBN 978-0-19-518249-1.
- Ehrman, Bart; Pleše, Zlatko (2011). The Apocryphal Gospels: Texts and Translations. Oxford University Press. ISBN 978-0-19-973210-4.
- Gounelle, Remi (2011). "Les origines littéraires de la légende de Véronique et de la Sainte Face: la Cura sanitatis Tiberii et la Vindicta Saluatoris". In Castagno, Adele Monaci (ed.). Sacre impronte e oggetti "non fatii da mano d'uomo" nelle religioni : atti del Convegno Internazionale, Torino, 18–20 maggio 2010. Alessandria: Edizioni dell'Orso. pp. 231–251. ISBN 9788862742993.
- Grace, Pamela (2004). "Sacred Savagery: The Passion of the Christ". Cinéaste. 29 (3): 13–17. JSTOR 41690249.
- Grüll, Tibor (2010). "The Legendary Fate of Pontius Pilate". Classica et Mediaevalia. 61: 151–176.
- Hourihane, Colum (2009). Pontius Pilate, Anti-Semitism, and the Passion in Medieval Art. Princeton and Oxford: Princeton University Press. ISBN 978-0-691-13956-2.
- Izydorczyk, Zbigniew, ed. (1997). The Medieval Gospel of Nicodemus: texts, intertexts, and contexts in Western Europe. Tempe, AZ: Medieval & Renaissance Texts and Studies. ISBN 0-86698-198-5.
- Kirschbaum, Engelbert; et al., eds. (1971). "Pilatus". Lexikon der christlichen Ikonographie. Vol. 3. Rome, Freiburg, Basel, Vienna: Herder. pp. 436–439.
- Koester, Helmut (1980). "Apocryphal and Canonical Gospels". The Harvard Theological Review. 73 (1/2): 105–130. doi:10.1017/S0017816000002066. JSTOR 1509481. S2CID 162904508.
- Langenhorst, Georg (1995). "The Rediscovery of Jesus as a Literary Figure". Literature and Theology. 9 (1): 85–98. doi:10.1093/litthe/9.1.85. JSTOR 23926700.
- Lémonon, Jean-Pierre (2007). Ponce Pilate. Paris: Atelier. ISBN 978-2708239180.
- Lönnqvist, Kenneth (2000). "Pontius Pilate – An Aqueduct Builder? – Recent Findings and New Suggestions". Klio. 82 (2): 52–67. doi:10.1524/klio.2000.82.2.459. S2CID 193871188.
- Luisier, Philippe (1996). "De Pilate chez les Coptes". Orientalia Christiana Periodica. 62: 411–426.
- MacAdam, Henry I. (2001). "Quid Est Veritas? Pontius Pilate in Fact, Fiction, Film, and Fantasy". Irish Biblical Studies. 23 (1): 66–99.
- MacAdam, Henry I. (2017). "Quod scripsi, scripsi: Pontius Pilatus Redivivus". The Polish Journal of Biblical Research. 17 (1–2): 129–140.
- Maier, Paul L. (1968). "Sejanus, Pilate, and the Date of the Crucifixion". Church History. 37 (1): 3–13. doi:10.2307/3163182. JSTOR 3163182. S2CID 162410612.
- Maier, Paul L. (1971). "The Fate of Pontius Pilate". Hermes. 99 (H. 3): 362–371. JSTOR 4475698.
- Martin, Gary (2019). "Phrases and Expressions that originated in the Bible". phrases.org.uk.
- Martin, Howard (1973). "The Legend of Pontius Pilate". Amsterdamer Beiträge zur älteren Germanistik. 4 (1): 95–118. doi:10.1163/18756719-005-01-90000007.
- McDonough, Christopher M. (2009). "Quid est Veritas? Pontius Pilate, the Passion, and the Pax Romana in Film". Sewanee Theological Review. 52 (2): 276–301.
- McGing, Brian C. (1991). "Pontius Pilate and the Sources". The Catholic Biblical Quarterly. 53 (3): 416–438. JSTOR 43718282.
- Meier, John P. (1990). "Jesus in Josephus: A Modest Proposal". The Catholic Biblical Quarterly. 52 (1): 76–103. JSTOR 43718026.
- Milinovich, Timothy M., ed. (2010). Pronunciation Guide for the Lectionary. Liturgy Training Publications.
- Morowitz, Laura (2009). "A Passion for Business: Wanamaker's, Munkácsy, and the Depiction of Christ". The Art Bulletin. 91 (2): 184–206. doi:10.1080/00043079.2009.10786164. JSTOR 40645479. S2CID 192152772.
- Muddiman, John; Barton, John (2010). The Gospels. Oxford University Press. ISBN 978-0-19-958025-5.
- Olausson, Lena; Sangster, Catherine, eds. (2006). Oxford BBC Guide to Pronunciation. Oxford University Press.
- Ollivier, Marie-Joseph (1896). "Ponce Pilate et les Pontii". Revue Biblique. 5 (2 and 4): 247–254, 594–600. JSTOR 44100212.
- Piovanelli, Pierluigi (2003). "Exploring the Ethiopic "Book of the Cock", An Apocryphal Passion Gospel from Late Antiquity". The Harvard Theological Review. 96 (4): 427–454. doi:10.1017/S0017816003000518. JSTOR 4151866. S2CID 162634709.
- Jones, Daniel (2006). Roach, Peter; Hartman, James; Setter, Jane (eds.). Cambridge Pronouncing Dictionary. Cambridge University Press.
- Schwartz, Daniel R. (1992). "Pontius Pilate". In Freedman, David Noel; Herion, Gary A.; Graf, David F.; Pleins, John David; Beck, Astrid B. (eds.). The Anchor Bible Dictionary. Vol. 5. New York: Doubleday. pp. 395–401. ISBN 0-385-19360-2.
- Taylor, Joan E. (2006). "Pontius Pilate and the Imperial Cult in Roman Judaea". New Testament Studies. 52 (4): 555–582. doi:10.1017/S0028688506000300. hdl:10289/960. S2CID 170175728.
- Trebilco, Paul (2007). The Early Christians in Ephesus from Paul to Ignatius (Reprint ed.). Wm. B. Eerdmans Publishing. ISBN 978-0-8028-0769-4.
- Vardaman, Jerry (1962). "A New Inscription Which Mentions Pilate as "Prefect"". Journal of Biblical Literature. 81 (1): 70–71. doi:10.2307/3264829. JSTOR 3264829.
- Whiston, William (1737). The Genuine Works of Flavius Josephus the Jewish Historian. London.
- Winkler, Martin M. (1998). "The Roman Empire in American Cinema after 1945". The Classical Journal. 93 (2): 167–196. JSTOR 3298137.
- Winter, Paul (1974). On the Trial of Jesus. Berlin/New York: de Gruyter. ISBN 3-11-002283-4.
- Wroe, Ann (1999). Pontius Pilate. New York: Random House. ISBN 0-375-50305-6.
- Yonge, Charles Duke (1855). The Works of Philo Judaeus, The contemporary of Josephus, translated from the Greek. Vol. 4. London: H. G. Bohn.
- Ziolkowski, Margaret (1992). "Pilate and Pilatism in Recent Russian Literature". In Graham, Sheelagh Duffin (ed.). New Directions in Soviet Literature: Selected Papers from the Fourth World Congress for Soviet and East European Studies, Harrogate, 1990. New York: St. Martin's Press in association with the International Council for Soviet and East European Studies. pp. 164–181. ISBN 0-312-07990-7.

Pontius Pilate Roman Rulers of Judaea
Preceded by Valerius Gratus	Prefect of Iudaea; 26–36	Succeeded by Marcellus
