= Warren Carter =

New Zealand-American minister

Warren Carter is an exegete specializing in the Gospel of Matthew, as well as the Greek New Testament in general. Born in New Zealand and now living in Tulsa, Oklahoma; Carter's education consists of a Ph.D. (New Testament), from Princeton Theological Seminary; a B.D., Th.M., from Melbourne College of Divinity, Australia; as well as a B.A. Hons, from Victoria University of Wellington, New Zealand. An ordained New Zealand Baptist minister with membership in the Disciples of Christ, Carter is currently the LaDonna Kramer Meinders Professor of New Testament at Phillips Theological Seminary. Before coming to Phillips in 2019, Carter was on the faculty at Brite Divinity School in Fort Worth, TX and, prior to that, at Saint Paul School of Theology in Kansas City.

After Carter's first year on the faculty at Brite Divinity School, he received the 2008 Louise Clark Brittan Endowed Faculty Excellence Award (an award voted on by the student body). He received the award three more times.

== Film Appearance[s] ==
Carter appeared in Fall From Grace, a documentary directed by K. Ryan Jones in 2007 in which the history, theology, culture, and psychology of the Westboro Baptist Church and of Fred Phelps are addressed. Carter appears in the film to offer a different, more contextually sensitive view of the scriptures that the church relies on in order to put forward its radically anti-homosexual viewpoint. Carter explains that homosexuality is only mentioned a total of three times in the New Testament, showing that the scripture was fairly unconcerned with the matter and that Phelps's virulence is out of proportion with its textual sources. Carter goes on to point out that these passages were in reference to pederasty, which would today be rightly identified as child molestation. Carter goes on to point out that loving and mutual homosexual relationships of the sort we see today were either nonexistent or rare in the 1st century.

== Selected works ==
- Seven Events That Shaped the New Testament World (Michigan: Baker Academic, 2013)
- John and Empire: Initial Explorations (New York: T & T Clark International, 2008).
- Matthew: Storyteller, Interpreter, Evangelist, Expanded Revised Edition (Peabody, MA: Hendrickson, 2004).
- Pontius Pilate: Portraits of a Roman Governor, Interfaces (Collegeville, MN: Liturgical Press, 2003).
- O Evangelho de sao Mateus (São Paulo, Brazil: Paulus, 2003).
- Matthew and Empire: Initial Explorations (Harrisburg, PA: Trinity Press International, 2001).
- New Proclamation: Year A, 2001-2002, co-authored with D. Jacobson, C.J. Dempsey, J.P. Heil (Minneapolis, MN: Fortress, 2001).
- Matthew and the Margins: A Religious and Socio-Political Reading (Maryknoll, NY: Orbis Books, 2000).
- Matthew's Parables: Audience-Oriented Perspectives, co-authored with J. P. Heil, Catholic Biblical Quarterly Monograph Series, no. 30 (Washington DC: Catholic Biblical Association, 1998).
- Matthew: Storyteller, Interpreter, Evangelist (Peabody, MA: Hendrickson, 1996).
