= Alexander Demandt =

German historian

Alexander Demandt (born 6 June 1937 in Marburg, Hesse-Nassau) is a German historian. He was professor of ancient history at the Free University of Berlin from 1974 to 2005. Demandt is an expert on the history of Rome, Late Antiquity, historiographical studies, and the links between philosophy and history.
