= Life of Jesus =

Part of the New Testament

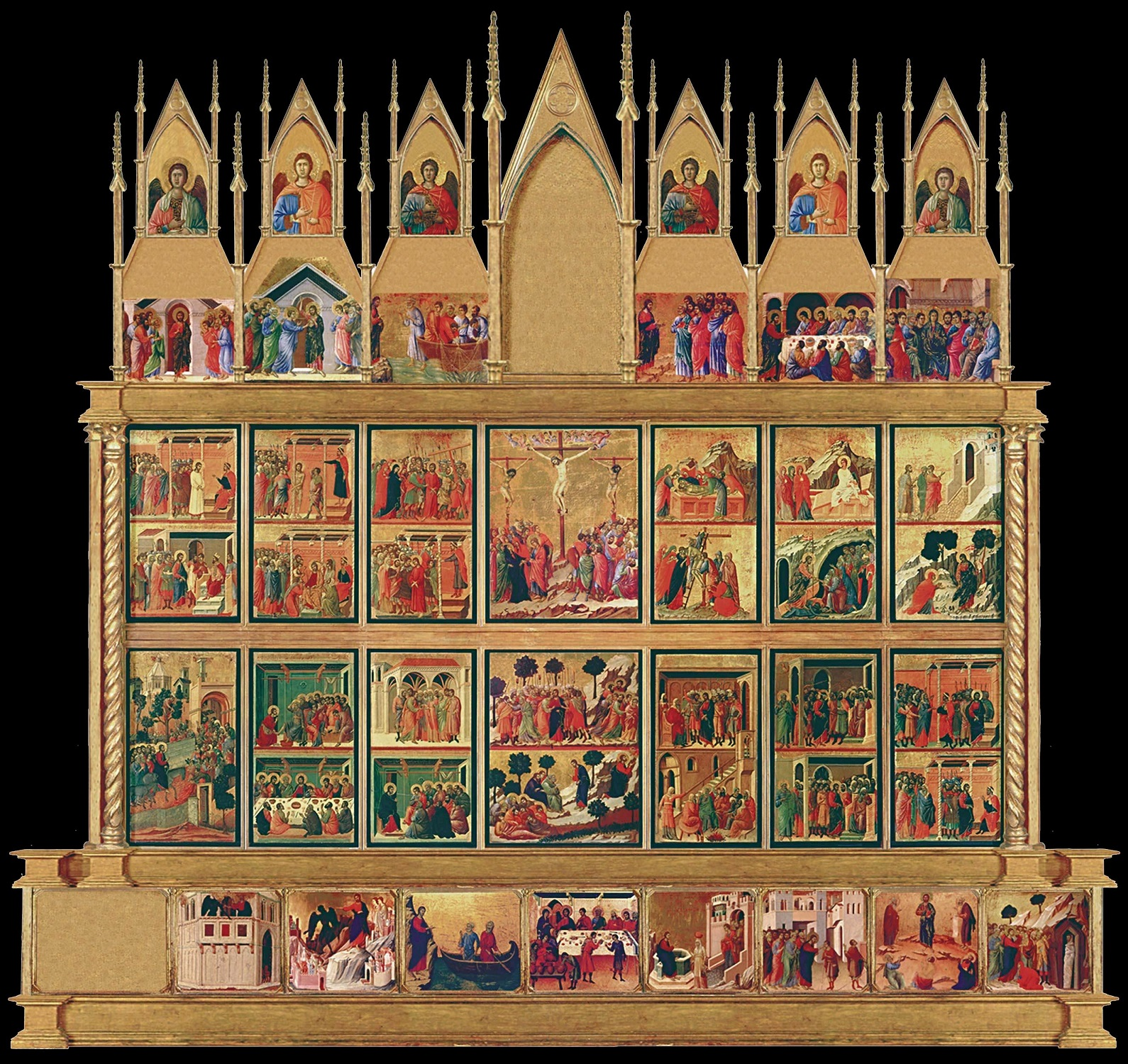
The Maestà by Duccio (1310), depicting the life of Christ, with 26 central scenes devoted to the Passion and Resurrection

The life of Jesus is the narrative of the birth, ministry, death and resurrection of Jesus as set out in the New Testament. It is recorded chiefly in the four canonical gospels, which outline the genealogy and nativity of Jesus, describe his public ministry and prophetic works, and conclude with his passion, resurrection and ascension. Other parts of the New Testament—such as the Pauline epistles which include references to key episodes in the life of Jesus, such as the Last Supper, and the Acts of the Apostles (1:1–11), which includes more references to the Ascension episode than the canonical gospels—also further expound upon the life of Jesus. In addition to these biblical texts, there are extra-biblical texts that make reference to certain events in the life of Jesus, such as Josephus on Jesus and Tacitus on Christ. The account given here follows the New Testament narrative; reconstructions of what can be established by historical method are treated at historical Jesus. The gospels were composed as ancient biographies with theological aims and do not always follow strict chronological order, as it was the norm among ancient historians and biographers to adapt their sources. The gospels follow each other closely compared to other ancient historians’ usage of sources, and academics debate to which extent this is indicative of their independence.

The genealogy and nativity appear only in Matthew and Luke. Both have Jesus conceived by the Holy Spirit and born in Bethlehem to Mary, and both trace Joseph back to David and Abraham. Matthew's genealogy is arranged in three sets of fourteen generations showing "Christ the King", while Luke's runs back to Adam to show Jesus as the "New Adam".. Luke features the Census of Quirinius, the manger and the shepherds, and Matthew the Magi, the massacre of the innocents, and the flight into Egypt.

The narrative is organized around five milestones: the Baptism, the Transfiguration, the Crucifixion, the Resurrection, and the Ascension. In the gospels, the ministry of Jesus starts with his baptism by John the Baptist in Jordan River. Jesus then fasted for 40 days and nights in the Judean Desert. This early period also includes the first miracle of Jesus in the Marriage at Cana. Luke gives Jesus' age at the start of his ministry as about thirty; a chronology of Jesus typically dates the ministry from 27–29 to 30–36. He then returns to Galilee, calls his first disciples by the Sea of Galilee, and preaches in the synagogue at Capernaum. The Galilean ministry includes the Sermon on the Mount, which forms the core of his moral teaching, a number of miracles, and the commissioning of the Twelve. It closes with the death of John the Baptist, Peter's confession of Jesus as the Christ, and the Transfiguration, witnessed by Peter, James and John. The ministry takes place mainly in Galilee and Judea, with activity also in Perea and Samaria.

Having predicted his death, Jesus makes a final journey to Jerusalem through Perea and Judea. In John this stretch ends with the raising of Lazarus, which leads Caiaphas and the Sanhedrin to plan his death. The final week opens with the entry into Jerusalem, followed by the clearing of the Temple and challenges to his authority. At the Last Supper Jesus institutes the Eucharist; he is then betrayed by Judas Iscariot in the Garden of Gethsemane, arrested, abandoned by his disciples and denied three times by Peter.

Jesus is tried by the Sanhedrin and condemned for claiming to be the Son of God, then handed to Pontius Pilate on a charge of claiming to be King of the Jews. Pilate declares him innocent but orders his crucifixion; Luke alone adds an appearance before Herod Antipas. He is crucified at Calvary between two convicted men, speaks the seven last sayings, and is buried in a rock-hewn tomb by Joseph of Arimathea.

On the first day of the week the tomb is found empty. All four gospels have women arriving first, with Mary Magdalene prominent among them, and the risen Jesus instructing them to tell the other disciples. Appearances follow over the days after, among them the road to Emmaus, the appearance to Thomas and the Great Commission. Acts places the Ascension forty days later at the Mount of Olives, where Jesus is taken up in the presence of his apostles.

== Genealogy and Nativity ==
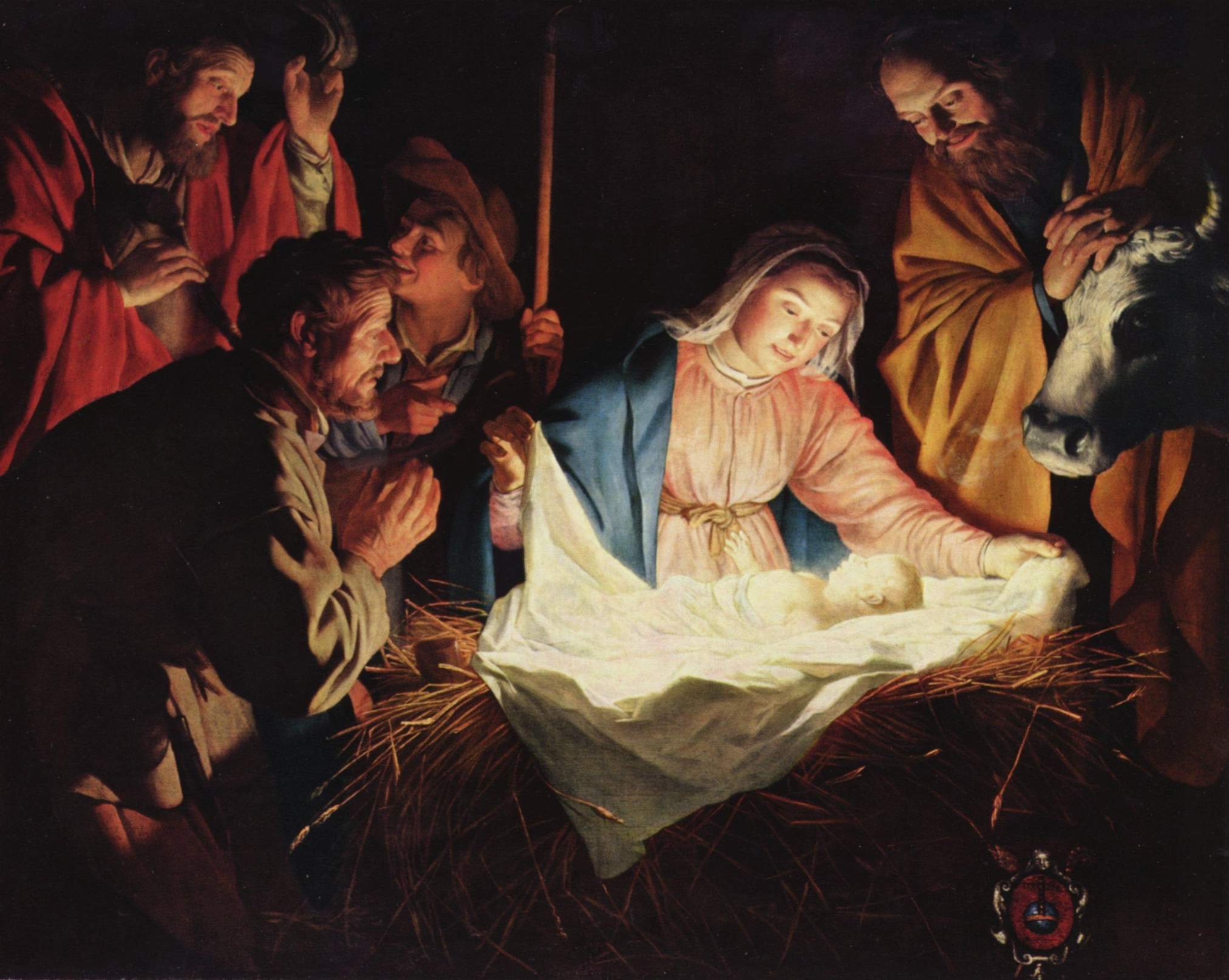
The Adoration of the Shepherds by Gerard van Honthorst, 1622

The genealogy and Nativity of Jesus are described in two of the four canonical gospels: the Gospel of Matthew and the Gospel of Luke. While Luke traces the genealogy upwards towards Adam and God, Matthew traces it downwards towards Jesus. Both gospels state that Jesus was not begotten by Joseph, but conceived miraculously in the womb of Mary, mother of Jesus, by the Holy Spirit. Both accounts trace Joseph back to King David and from there to Abraham. These lists are identical between Abraham and David (except for one name), but they differ almost completely between David and Joseph. Matthew gives Jacob as Joseph's father, and Luke says Joseph was the son of Heli. Attempts to explain the differences between the genealogies have varied in nature. Marcus Borg and John Dominic Crossan interprets them as literary inventions.

The Luke and Matthew accounts of the birth of Jesus have a number of points in common; both have Jesus born in Bethlehem, in Judea, to a virgin mother. In the Luke account, Joseph and Mary travel from their home in Nazareth to Bethlehem for the census, where Jesus is born and laid in a manger. Angels proclaim him a savior for all people, and shepherds come to adore him; the Holy Family then returns to Nazareth. In Matthew, the Magi follow a star to Bethlehem, where the family is staying, to bring gifts to Jesus, born the King of the Jews. King Herod massacres all males under two years old in Bethlehem in order to kill Jesus, but Jesus' family flees to Egypt and later settles in Nazareth. Over the centuries, biblical scholars have attempted to reconcile these differences, while modern scholarship mostly views them as legendary, though conservative scholars maintain the historicity. Generally, they consider the issue of historicity secondary, given that the gospels were primarily written as theological documents rather than chronological timelines.

== Ministry ==
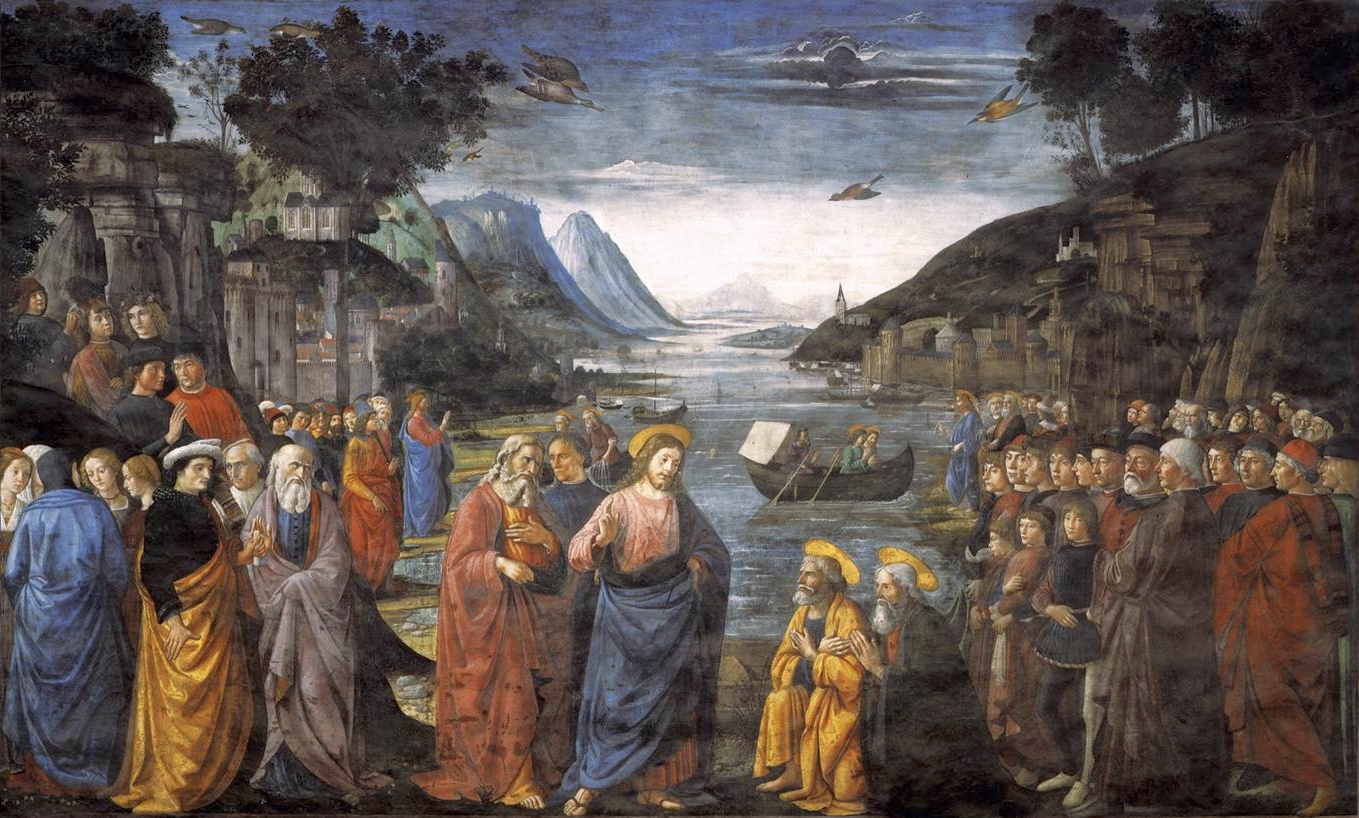
Calling of the Apostles by Domenico Ghirlandaio (1481) depicts Jesus commissioning the Twelve Apostles.

The five major milestones in the New Testament narrative of the life of Jesus are his Baptism, Transfiguration, Crucifixion, Resurrection and Ascension. Scholarly assessment of these episodes varies. The baptism and the crucifixion are regarded by most scholars as historically certain and are often taken as starting points for study of the historical Jesus.

In the gospel accounts, the ministry of Jesus begins in the countryside of Roman Judea and Transjordan, near the Jordan River, and ends in Jerusalem, following the Last Supper with his disciples. The Gospel of Luke (3:23) states that Jesus was "about 30 years of age" at the start of his ministry. A chronology of Jesus typically has the date of the start of his ministry estimated at 27–29 and the end in the range 30–36.

Jesus' early Galilean ministry begins after his Baptism when he returns to Galilee from his time in the Judaean Desert. Jesus then begins preaching in Galilee and recruits his first disciples, or apostles. They travel with him and ultimately become the core of the early Church, as it is believed that the Apostles dispersed from Jerusalem to found the Apostolic Sees. The major Galilean ministry which begins in Matthew 8 includes the commissioning of the Twelve Apostles, and covers most of the ministry of Jesus in Galilee.

After the proclamation of Jesus as Christ, three of the disciples (Peter, James, and John) witness his Transfiguration. After the death of John the Baptist and the Transfiguration, Jesus starts his final journey to Jerusalem, having predicted his own death there.

In his later Judean ministry Jesus makes his way to Jerusalem through Judea. As Jesus travels towards Jerusalem, in the later Perean ministry, about one third the way down from the Sea of Galilee (actually a fresh water lake) along the River Jordan, he returns to the area where he was baptized. The final ministry in Jerusalem, called the Passion Week or Holy Week, begins with Jesus' triumphal entry into Jerusalem. As he enters Jerusalem to public acclaim, there friction with the Pharisees increases and his disciple, Judas, agrees to betray him for 30 silver coins. The gospels provide more details about the final ministry than the other periods, devoting about one third of their text to the last week of the life of Jesus in Jerusalem. In the gospel accounts, towards the end of the final week in Jerusalem, Jesus has the Last Supper with his disciples, and the next day is betrayed, arrested and tried. The trial ends in his Crucifixion and death. Three days after his burial, he is Resurrected and appears to his disciples and a multitude of his followers (numbering around 500 in total) over a 40-day period (1 Corinthians 15) after which he ascends to Heaven.

=== Locations of Ministry ===
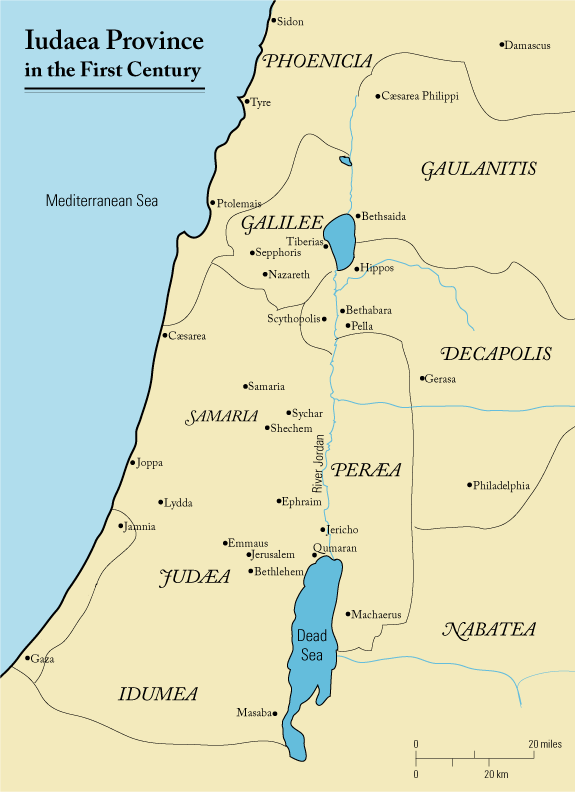
Galilee, Perea and Judea at the time of Jesus

In the New Testament accounts, the principal locations for the ministry of Jesus were Galilee and Judea, with activities also taking place in surrounding areas such as Perea and Samaria.

The gospel narrative of the ministry of Jesus is traditionally separated into sections that have a geographical nature.

- Galilean ministry: The ministry of Jesus begins when after his baptism, he returns to Galilee, and preaches in the synagogue of Capernaum. The first disciples of Jesus encounter him near the Sea of Galilee and his later Galilean ministry includes key episodes such as the Sermon on the Mount (with the Beatitudes) which form the core of his moral teachings. His ministry in the Galilee area draws to an end with the death of John the Baptist.

- Journey to Jerusalem: After the death of John the Baptist, about half way through the gospels (approximately Matthew 17 and Mark 9) two key events take place that change the nature of the narrative by beginning the gradual revelation of his identity to his disciples: his proclamation as Christ by Peter and his transfiguration. After these events, a good portion of the gospel narratives deal with Jesus' final journey to Jerusalem through Perea and Judea. As Jesus travels towards Jerusalem through Perea he returns to the area where he was baptized.

- Final week in Jerusalem: The final part of Jesus' ministry begins (Matthew 21 and Mark 11) with his triumphal entry into Jerusalem after the raising of Lazarus episode which takes place in Bethany. The gospels provide more details about the final portion than the other periods, devoting about one third of their text to the last week of the life of Jesus in Jerusalem which ends in his crucifixion. The New Testament accounts of the resurrection appearances of Jesus and his ascension are also in Judea.

=== Baptism and temptation ===
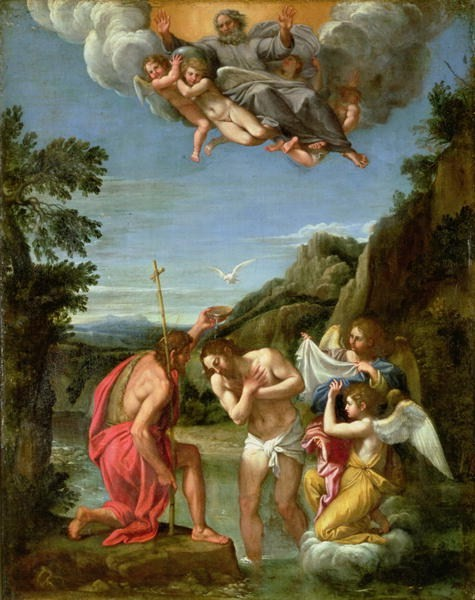
Francesco Albani's 17th-century Baptism of Christ is a typical depiction with the sky opening and the Holy Spirit descending as a dove as Jesus is baptized by John.

The baptism of Jesus marks the beginning of his public ministry. This event is recorded in the Canonical Gospels of Matthew, Mark and Luke. In John 1:29–33, rather than a direct narrative, John the Baptist bears witness to the episode.

In the New Testament, John the Baptist preached a "baptism with water", not of forgiveness but of penance or repentance for the remission of sins (Luke 3:3), and declared himself a forerunner to one who would baptize "with the Holy Spirit and with fire" (Luke 3:16). In so doing he was preparing the way for Jesus. Jesus came to the Jordan River where he was baptized by John. The baptismal scene includes the Heavens opening, a dove-like descent of the Holy Spirit, and a voice from Heaven saying, "This is my beloved Son with whom I am well pleased."

Most modern scholars view the fact that Jesus was baptized by John as a historical event to which a high degree of certainty can be assigned. James Dunn states that the historicity of the baptism and crucifixion of Jesus "command almost universal assent". Along with the crucifixion of Jesus most scholars view his baptism as one of the two historically certain facts about him, and often use it as the starting points for the study of the historical Jesus.

The temptation of Jesus is detailed in the gospels of Matthew, Mark, and Luke. In these narratives, after being baptized, Jesus fasted for forty days and nights in the Judaean Desert. During this time, Satan appeared to Jesus and tempted him. Jesus having refused each temptation, Satan departed and angels came and brought nourishment to Jesus.

=== Calling the disciples and early Ministry ===
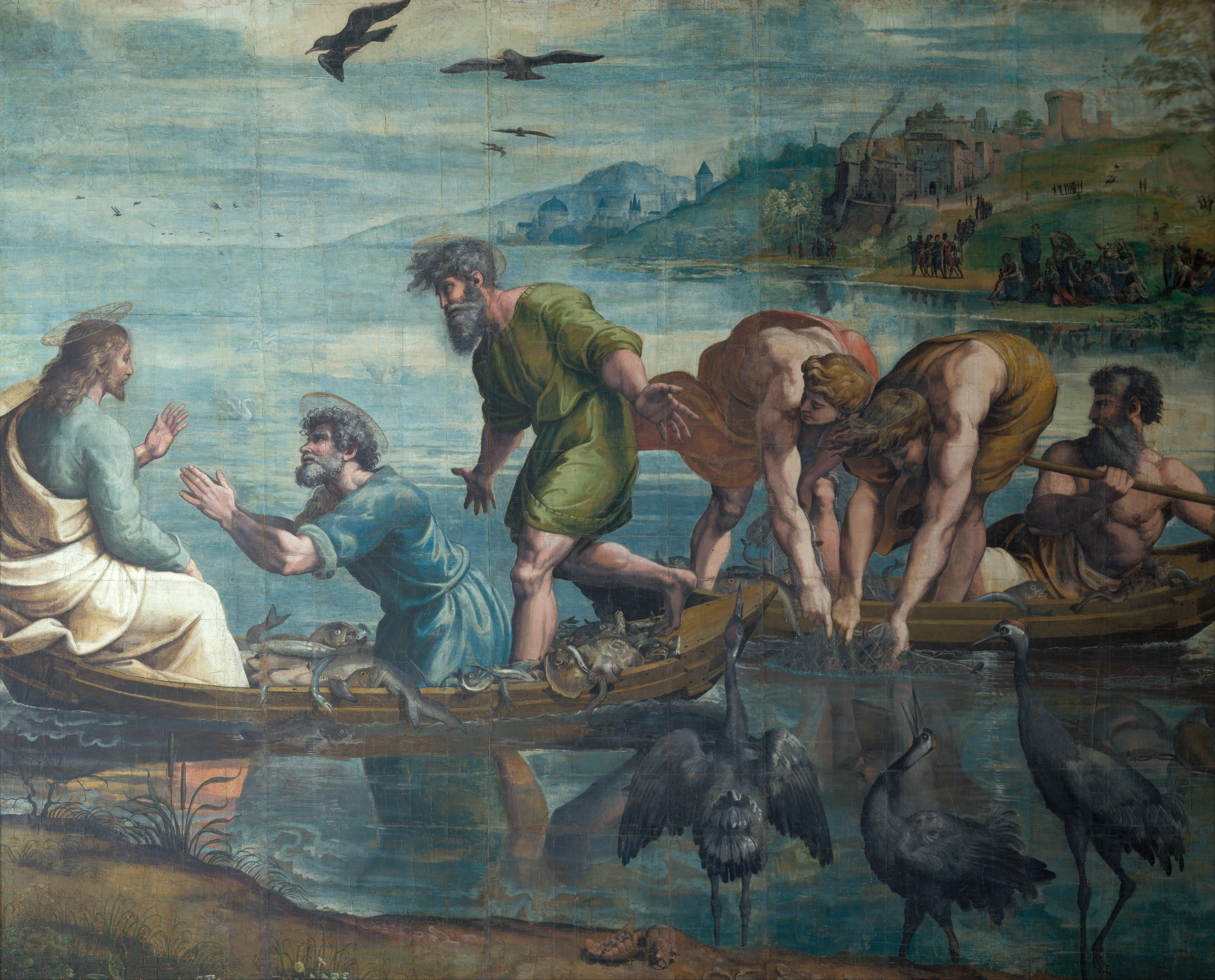
Calling of the disciples and the miraculous catch of fish, by Raphael, 1515

The calling of the first disciples is a key episode in the gospels which begins the active ministry of Jesus, and builds the foundation for the group of people who follow him, and later form the early Church. It takes place in Matthew 4:18–22, Mark 1:16–20 and Luke 5:1–11 on the Sea of Galilee. John 1:35–51 reports the first encounter with two of the disciples a little earlier in the presence of John the Baptist. Particularly in the Gospel of Mark the beginning of the ministry of Jesus and the call of the first disciples are inseparable.

In the Gospel of Luke (Luke 5:1–11), the event is part of the first miraculous catch of fish and results in Peter as well as James and John, the sons of Zebedee, joining Jesus vocationally as disciples. The gathering of the disciples in John 1:35–51 follows the many patterns of discipleship that continue in the New Testament, in that who have received someone else's witness become witnesses to Jesus themselves. Andrew follows Jesus because of the testimony of John the Baptist, Philip brings Nathanael and the pattern continues in John 4:4–26 where the Samaritan Woman at the Well testifies to the town people about Jesus.

This early period also includes the first miracle of Jesus in the Marriage at Cana, in the Gospel of John where Jesus and his disciples are invited to a wedding and when the wine runs out Jesus turns water into wine by performing a miracle.

=== Ministry and miracles in Galilee ===
Jesus' activities in Galillee include a number of miracles and teachings. The beginnings of this period include The Centurion's Servant (8:5–13) and Calming the storm (Matthew 8:23–27) both dealing with the theme of faith overcoming fear. In this period, Jesus also gathers disciples, e.g. calls Matthew. The Commissioning the twelve Apostles relates the initial selection of the twelve Apostles among the disciples of Jesus. Most scholars accept the parables of Jesus as authentically dominical.

In the Mission Discourse, Jesus instructs the twelve apostles who are named in Matthew 10:2–3 to carry no belongings as they travel from city to city and preach. Separately in Luke 10:1–24 relates the Seventy Disciples, in which Jesus appoints a larger number of disciples and sent them out in pairs with the Missionary's Mandate to go into villages before Jesus arrives there.

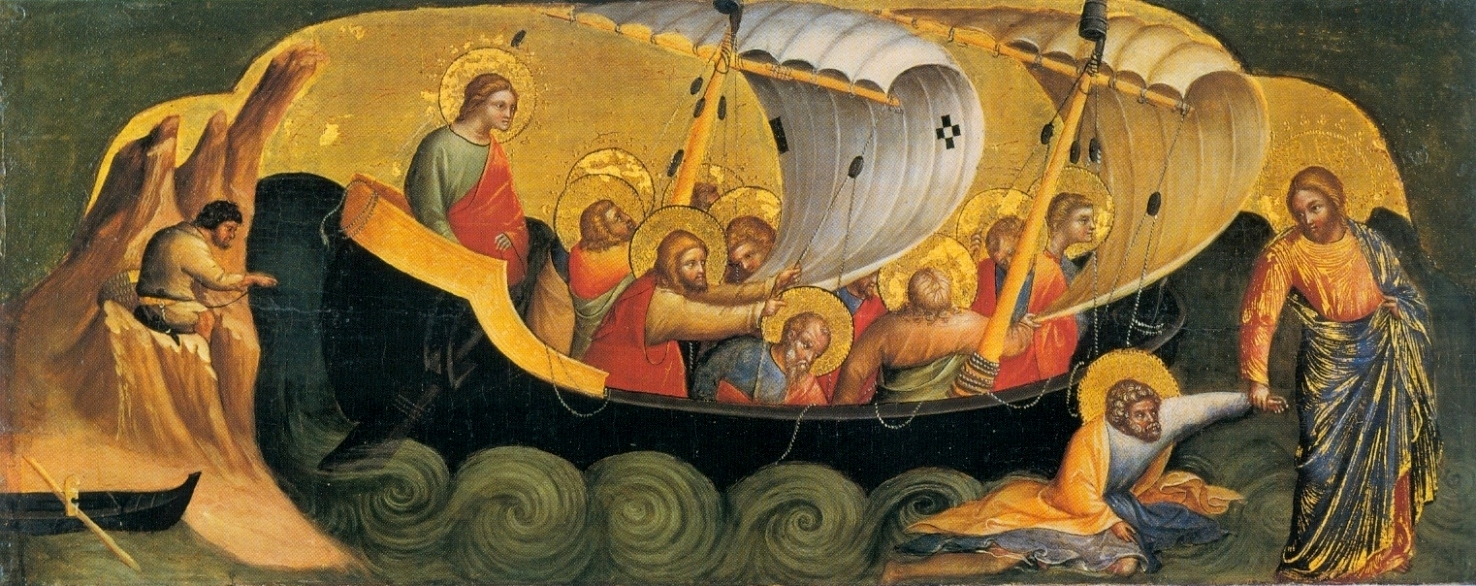
Walking on water, by Veneziano, 1370

After hearing of John the Baptist's death, Jesus withdraws by boat privately to a solitary place near Bethsaida, where he addresses the crowds who had followed him on foot from the towns, and feeds them all by "five loaves and two fish" supplied by a boy. Following this, the gospels present the Walking on water episode in Matthew 14:22–23, Mark 6:45–52 and John 6:16–21 as an important step in developing the relationship between Jesus and his disciples, at this stage of his ministry. The episode emphasizes the importance of faith by stating that when he attempted to walk on water, Peter began to sink when he lost faith and became afraid, and at the end of the episode, the disciples increase their faith in Jesus and in Matthew 14:33 they say: "Of a truth thou art the Son of God".

Major teachings in this period include the Discourse on Defilement in Matthew 15:1–20 and Mark 7:1–23 where in response to a complaint from the Pharisees Jesus states: "What goes into a man's mouth does not make him 'unclean,' but what comes out of his mouth, that is what makes him 'unclean.'".

Following this episode Jesus withdraws into the "parts of Tyre and Sidon" near the Mediterranean Sea where the Canaanite woman's daughter episode takes place in Matthew 15:21–28 and Mark 7:24–30. This episode is an example of how Jesus emphasizes the value of faith, telling the woman: "Woman, you have great faith! Your request is granted." The importance of faith is also emphasized in the Cleansing ten lepers episode in Luke 17:11–19.

In the Gospel of Mark, after passing through Sidon Jesus enters the region of the Decapolis, a group of ten cities south east of Galilee, where the Healing the deaf mute miracle is reported in Mark 7:31–37, where after the healing, the disciples say: "He even makes the deaf hear and the mute speak." The episode is the last in a series of narrated miracles which builds up to Peter's proclamation of Jesus as Christ in Mark 8:29.

=== Proclamation as Christ ===
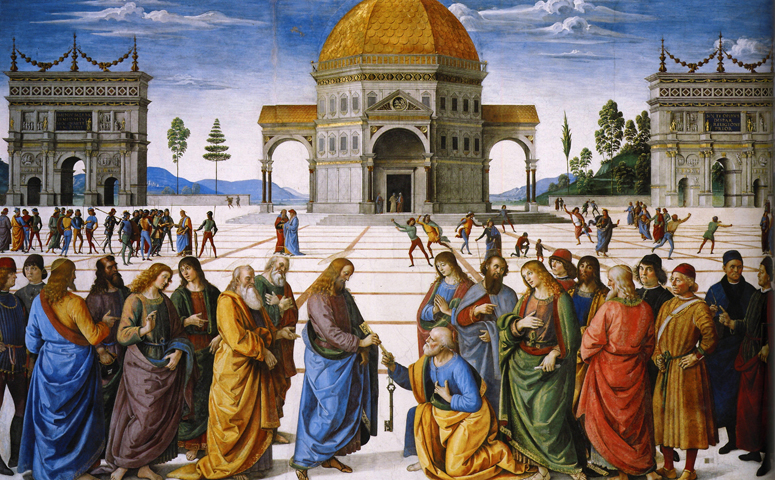
Pietro Perugino's depiction of the "Giving of the Keys to Saint Peter" by Jesus, 1481–82

The Confession of Peter refers to an episode in the New Testament in which in Jesus asks a question to his disciples: "Who do you say that I am?" Apostle Peter proclaims Jesus to be Christ — the expected Messiah. The proclamation is described in the three synoptic gospels: Matthew 16:13–20, Mark 8:27–30 and Luke 9:18–20.

Peter's Confession begins as a dialogue between Jesus and his disciples in which Jesus begins to ask about the current opinions about himself among "the multitudes", asking: "Who do the multitudes say that I am?" The disciples provide a variety of the common hypotheses at the time. Jesus then asks his disciples about their own opinion: But who do you say that I am? Only Simon Peter answers him: You are the Christ, the Son of the living God.

In Matthew 16:17 Jesus blesses Peter for his answer, and later indicates him as the rock of the Church, and states that he will give Peter "the keys of the kingdom of heaven".

In blessing Peter, Jesus not only accepts the titles Christ and Son of God which Peter attributes to him, but declares the proclamation a divine revelation by stating that his Father in Heaven had revealed it to Peter. In this assertion, by endorsing both titles as divine revelation, Jesus unequivocally declares himself to be both Christ and the Son of God. The proclamation of Jesus as Christ is fundamental to Christology and the Confession of Peter, and Jesus' acceptance of the title is a definitive statement for it in the New Testament narrative. Casey views references to Christ as an addition by Matthew, though he concedes the passage has authentic elements.

=== Transfiguration ===
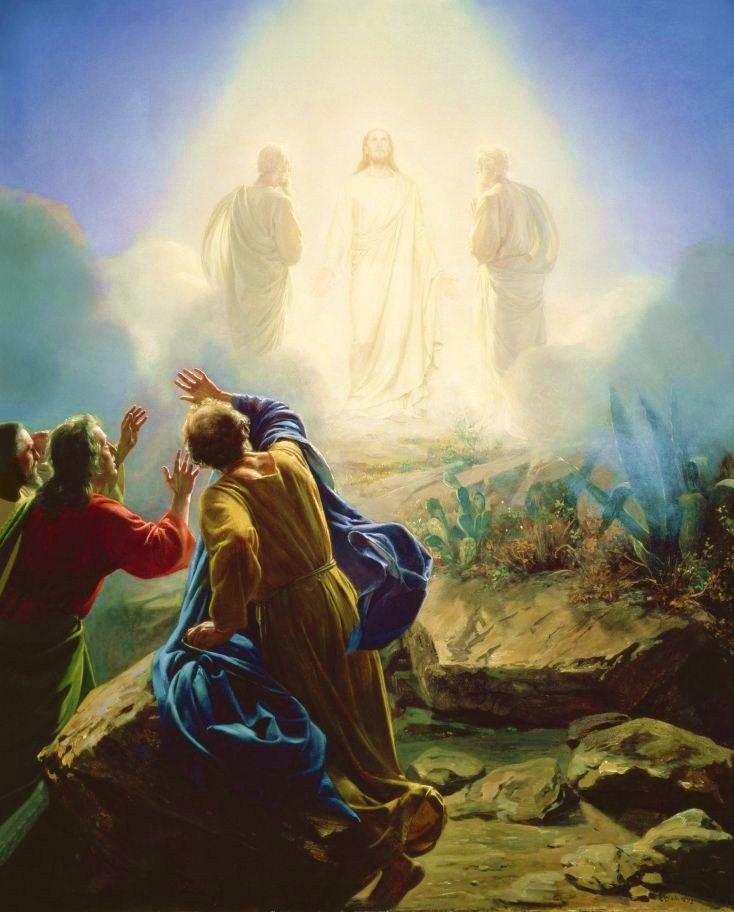
The Transfiguration of Jesus, depicted by Carl Bloch, 19th century

The Transfiguration is an episode in the New Testament narrative in which Jesus is transfigured and becomes radiant upon a mountain. The synoptic gospels (Matthew 17:1–9, Mark 9:2–8, Luke 9:28–36) describe it, and 2 Peter 1:16–18 refers to it. In these accounts, Jesus and three of his apostles go to a mountain (the Mount of Transfiguration). On the mountain, Jesus begins to shine with bright rays of light. Then the prophets Moses and Elijah appear next to him and he speaks with them. Jesus is then called "Son" by a voice in the sky, assumed to be God the Father, as in the Baptism of Jesus.

The Transfiguration is one of the miracles of Jesus in the gospels' accounts. This miracle is unique among others that appear in the Canonical gospels, in that the miracle happens to Jesus himself. Thomas Aquinas considered the Transfiguration "the greatest miracle" in that it complemented baptism and showed the perfection of life in Heaven. The Transfiguration is one of the five major milestones in the gospel narrative of the life of Jesus, the others being Baptism, Crucifixion, Resurrection, and Ascension. In the New Testament, Transfiguration is a pivotal moment, and the setting on the mountain is presented as the point where human nature meets God: the meeting place for the temporal and the eternal, with Jesus himself as the connecting point, acting as the bridge between heaven and earth.

=== Final journey to Jerusalem ===
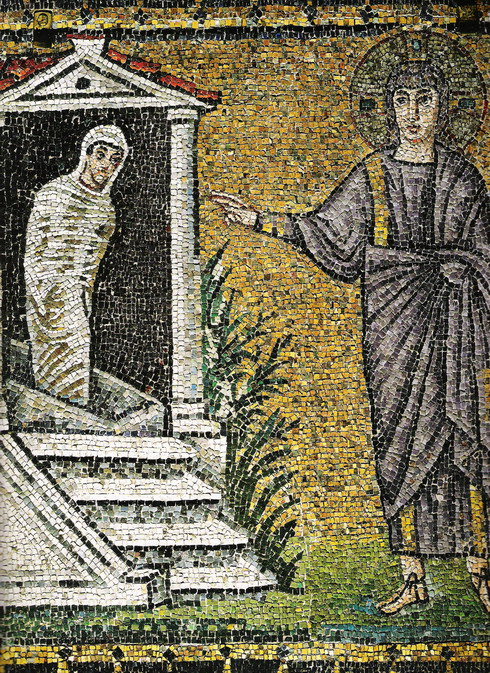
Sixth-century mosaic of the Raising of Lazarus, church of Sant'Apollinare Nuovo, Ravenna, Italy

After the death of John the Baptist and the Transfiguration, Jesus starts his final journey to Jerusalem, having predicted his own death there. The Gospel of John states that during the final journey Jesus returned to the area where he was baptized, and John 10:40–42 states that "many people believed in him beyond the Jordan", saying "all things whatsoever John spake of this man were true". The area where Jesus was baptised is inferred as the vicinity of the Perea area, given the activities of the Baptist in Bethabara and Ænon in John 1:28 and 3:23. Scholars generally assume that the route Jesus followed from Galilee to Jerusalem passed through Perea.

This period of ministry includes the Discourse on the Church in which Jesus anticipates a future community of followers, and explains the role of his apostles in leading it. It includes the parables of The Lost Sheep and The Unforgiving Servant in Matthew 18 which also refer to the Kingdom of Heaven. The general theme of the discourse is the anticipation of a future community of followers, and the role of his apostles in leading it. Addressing his apostles in 18:18, Jesus states: "what things soever ye shall bind on earth shall be bound in heaven; and what things soever ye shall loose on earth shall be loosed in heaven". The discourse emphasizes the importance of humility and self-sacrifice as the high virtues within the anticipated community. It teaches that in the Kingdom of God, it is childlike humility that matters, not social prominence and prestige.

At the end of this period, the Gospel of John includes the Raising of Lazarus episode in John 11:1–46 in which Jesus brings Lazarus of Bethany back to life four days after his burial. In the Gospel of John, the raising of Lazarus is the climax of the "seven signs" which gradually confirm the identity of Jesus as the Son of God and the expected Messiah. It is also a pivotal episode which starts the chain of events that leads to the crowds seeking Jesus on his triumphal entry into Jerusalem — leading to the decision of Caiaphas and the Sanhedrin to plan to kill Jesus.

=== Final week in Jerusalem ===
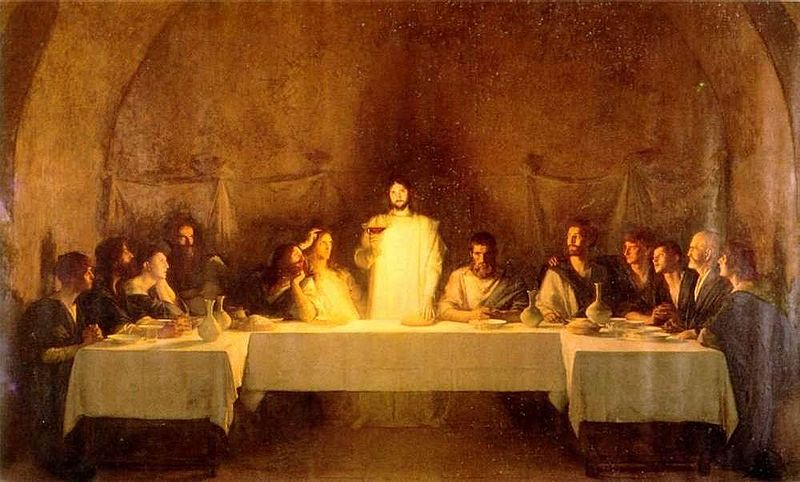
The Last Supper has been depicted by many artistic masters. This Last Supper is by Pascal Dagnan-Bouveret (1896).

The description of the last week of the life of Jesus occupies about one third of the narrative in the canonical gospels. The narrative for that week starts by a description of the final entry into Jerusalem, and ends with his crucifixion.

The last week in Jerusalem is the conclusion of the journey which Jesus had started in Galilee through Perea and Judea. Just before the account of the final entry of Jesus into Jerusalem, the Gospel of John includes the Raising of Lazarus episode, which builds the tension between Jesus and the authorities. At the beginning of the week as Jesus enters Jerusalem, he is greeted by the cheering crowds, adding to that tension.

The week begins with Jesus' triumphal entry into Jerusalem. During the week of his "final ministry in Jerusalem", Jesus visits the Temple, and has a conflict with the money changers about their use of the Temple for commercial purposes. This is followed by a debate with the priests and the elder in which his authority is questioned. One of his disciples, Judas Iscariot, agrees to turn Jesus over to his enemies in exchange for 30 silver coins.

Towards the end of the week, Jesus has the Last Supper with his disciples, during which he institutes the Eucharist, and prepares them for his departure in the Farewell Discourse. After the supper, Jesus is betrayed with a kiss while he is in Agony in the Garden, and is arrested. After his arrest, Jesus is abandoned by most of his disciples, and Peter denies him three times, as Jesus had predicted during the Last Supper. Most New Testament scholars accept the historicity of the Denial of Peter.

== Passion ==
=== Betrayal and arrest ===
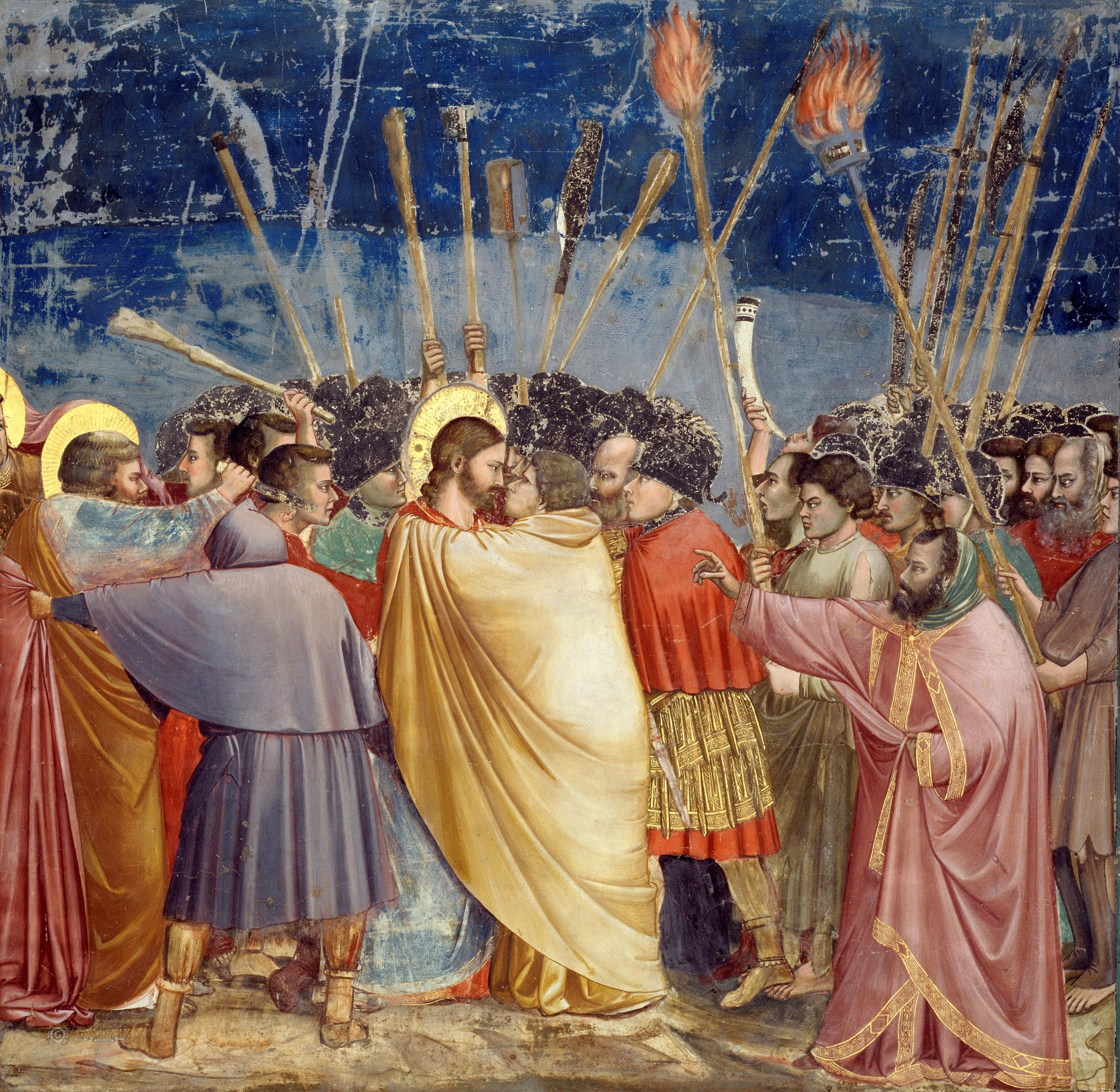
Kiss of Judas (1304–1306), fresco by Giotto, Scrovegni Chapel, Padua, Italy

In Matthew 26:36–46, Mark 14:32–42, Luke 22:39–46 and John 18:1, immediately after the Last Supper, Jesus takes a walk to pray, Matthew and Mark identifying this place of prayer as Garden of Gethsemane.

Jesus is accompanied by Peter, John and James the Greater, whom he asks to "remain here and keep watch with me." He moves "a stone's throw away" from them, where he feels overwhelming sadness and says "My Father, if it is possible, let this cup pass me by. Nevertheless, let it be as you, not I, would have it." Only the Gospel of Luke mentions the details of the sweat of blood of Jesus and the visitation of the angel who comforts Jesus as he accepts the will of the Father. Returning to the disciples after prayer, he finds them asleep and in Matthew 26:40 he asks Peter: "So, could you men not keep watch with me for an hour?"

While in the Garden, Judas appears, accompanied by a crowd that includes the Jewish priests and elders and people with weapons. Judas gives Jesus a kiss to identify him to the crowd who then arrests Jesus. One of Jesus' disciples tries to stop them and uses a sword to cut off the ear of one of the men in the crowd. Luke states that Jesus miraculously healed the wound and John and Matthew state that Jesus criticized the violent act, insisting that his disciples should not resist his arrest. In Matthew 26:52 Jesus makes the well known statement: all who live by the sword, shall die by the sword.

=== Justice ===
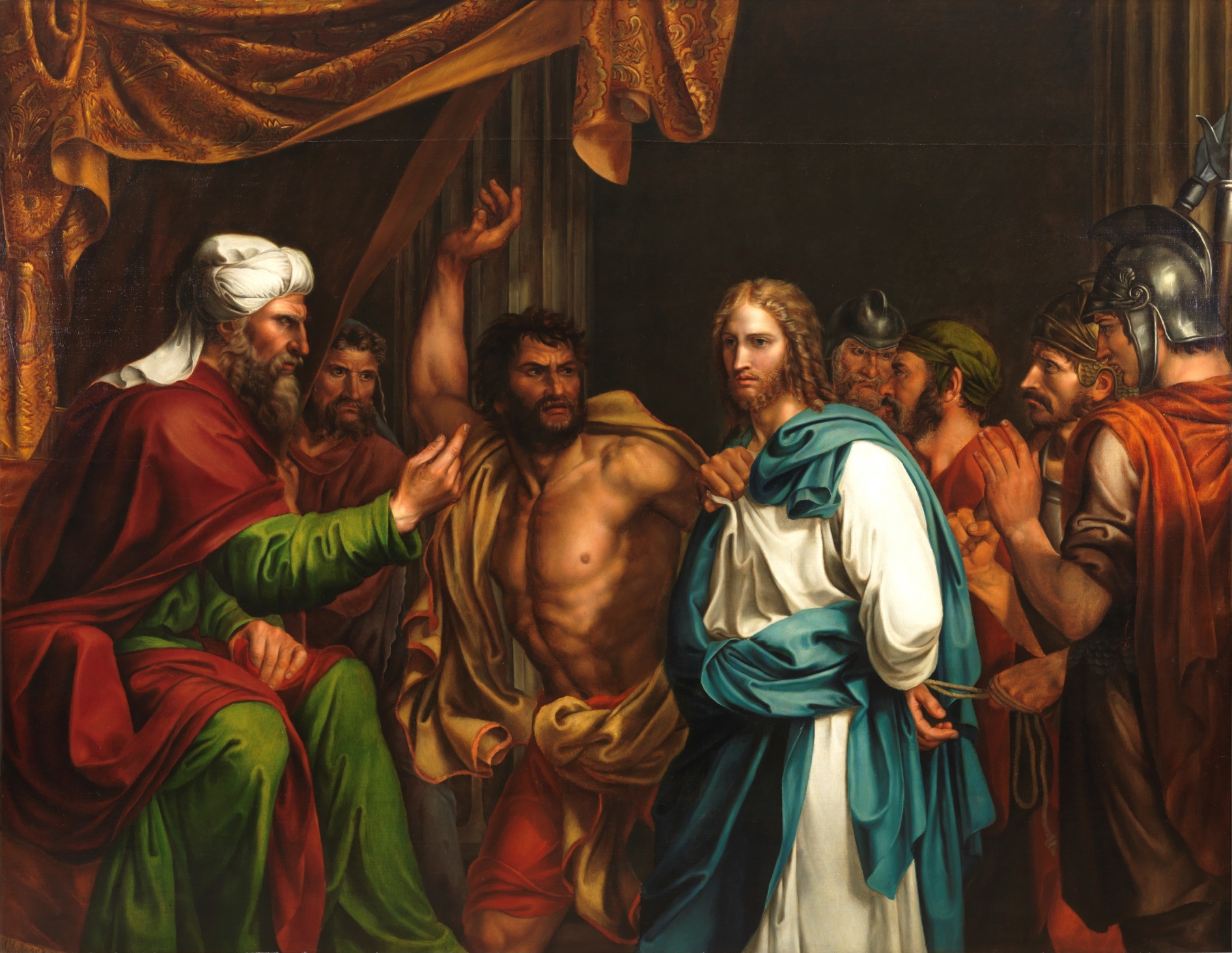
Jesus about to be struck in front of the High Priest Annas, as in John 18:22, depicted by Madrazo, 1803

In the narrative of the four canonical gospels after the betrayal and arrest of Jesus, he is taken to the Sanhedrin, a Jewish judicial body. Jesus is tried by the Sanhedrin, mocked and beaten and is condemned for making claims of being the Son of God. He is then taken to Pontius Pilate and the Jewish elders ask Pilate to judge and condemn Jesus—accusing him of claiming to be the King of the Jews. After questioning, with few replies provided by Jesus, Pilate publicly declares that he finds Jesus innocent, but the crowd insists on punishment. Pilate then orders Jesus' crucifixion. Although the Gospel accounts vary with respect to various details, they agree on the general character and overall structure of the trials of Jesus.

After the Sanhedrin trial Jesus is taken to Pilate's court in the praetorium. Only in the Gospel of Luke, finding that Jesus, being from Galilee, belonged to Herod Antipas' jurisdiction, Pilate decides to send Jesus to Herod. Herod Antipas (the same man who had previously ordered the death of John the Baptist) had wanted to see Jesus for a long time, because he had been hoping to observe one of the miracles of Jesus. However, Jesus says nothing in response to Herod's questions, or the vehement accusations of the chief priests and the scribes. Herod and his soldiers mock Jesus, put a gorgeous robe on him, as the King of the Jews, and sent him back to Pilate. And Herod and Pilate become friends with each other that day: for before they were at enmity. After questioning Jesus and receiving no replies, Herod sees Jesus as no threat and returns him to Pilate.

After Jesus' return from Herod's court, Pilate publicly declares that he finds Jesus to be innocent of the charges, but the crowd insists on capital punishment. The universal rule of the Roman Empire limited capital punishment strictly to the tribunal of the Roman governor and Pilate decided to publicly wash his hands as not being privy to Jesus' death. Pilate thus presents himself as an advocate pleading Jesus' case rather than as a judge in an official hearing, yet he orders the crucifixion of Jesus.

=== Crucifixion and burial ===
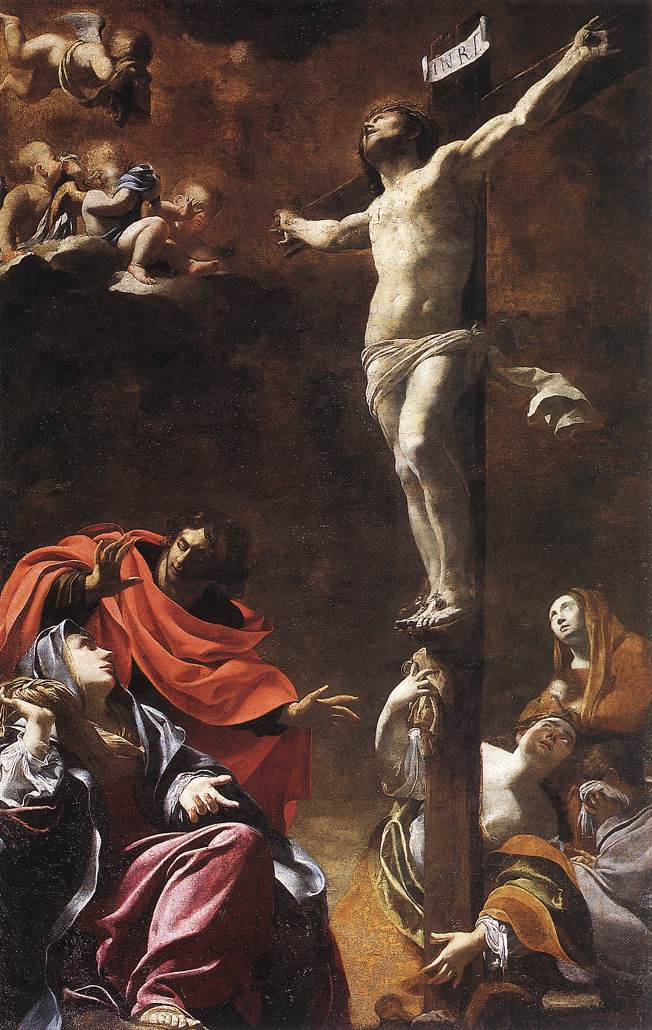
The Crucifixion (1622) by Simon Vouet; Church of Jesus, Genoa

Jesus' crucifixion is described in all four canonical gospels, and is attested to by other sources of that age (e.g. Josephus and Tacitus), and is regarded as a historical event.

After the trials, Jesus made his way to Calvary (the path is traditionally called Via Dolorosa) and the three synoptic gospels indicate that he was assisted by Simon of Cyrene, the Romans compelling him to do so. In Luke 23:27–28 Jesus tells the women in multitude of people following him not to cry for him but for themselves and their children. Once at Calvary (Golgotha), Jesus was offered wine mixed with gall to drink — usually offered as a form of painkiller. Matthew's and Mark's gospels state that he refused this.

The soldiers then crucified Jesus and cast lots for his clothes. Above Jesus' head on the cross was the inscription King of the Jews, and the soldiers and those passing by mocked him about the title. Jesus was crucified between two convicted thieves, one of whom rebuked Jesus, while the other defended him. Each gospel has its own account of Jesus' last words, comprising the seven last sayings on the cross. In John 19:26–27 Jesus entrusts his mother to the disciple he loved and in Luke 23:34 he states: "Father, forgive them; for they know not what they do", usually interpreted as his forgiveness of the Roman soldiers and the others involved.

In the three synoptic gospels, various supernatural events accompany the crucifixion, including darkness of the sky, an earthquake, and (in Matthew) the resurrection of saints. The tearing of the temple veil, upon the death of Jesus, is referenced in the synoptic. The Roman soldiers did not break Jesus' legs, as they did to the other two men crucified (breaking the legs hastened the crucifixion process), as Jesus was dead already; this further fulfilled prophecy, as noted in John 19:36, "For these things were done, that the scripture should be fulfilled, A bone of him shall not be broken." One of the soldiers pierced the side of Jesus with a lance and blood and water flowed out. In Mark 15:39, impressed by the events, the Roman centurion calls Jesus the Son of God.

Following Jesus' death on Friday, Joseph of Arimathea asked the permission of Pilate to remove the body. The body was removed from the cross, was wrapped in a clean cloth and buried in a new rock-hewn tomb, with the assistance of Nicodemus. In Matthew 27:62–66 the Jews go to Pilate the day after the crucifixion and ask for guards for the tomb and also seal the tomb with a stone as well as the guard, to be sure the body remains there.

Approximate chronological comparison between the Jesus Passion narratives according to the Gospels of Mark and John. Each section ('1' to '28') represents three hours of time.

== Resurrection and Ascension ==
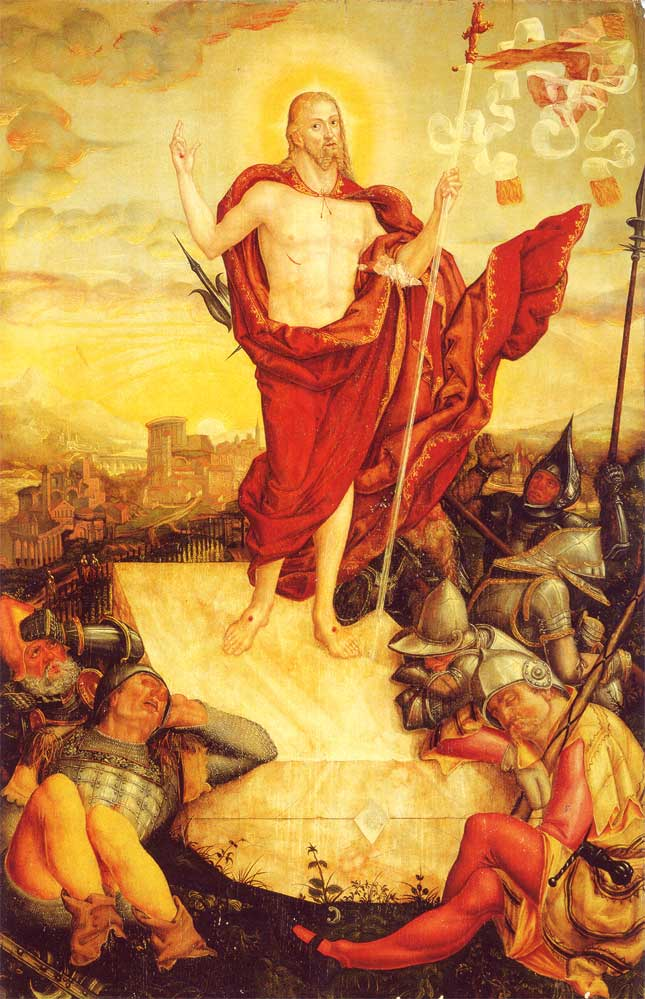
Resurrection of Jesus by Lucas Cranach, 1558

The gospels state that the first day of the week after the crucifixion (typically interpreted as a Sunday), the followers of Jesus encounter him risen from the dead, after his tomb was discovered to be empty. The New Testament does not include an account of the "moment of resurrection" and in the Eastern Church icons do not depict that moment, but show the Myrrhbearers, and depict scenes of salvation.

The resurrected Jesus then appears to his followers that day and a number of times thereafter, delivers sermons and has supper with some of them, before ascending to Heaven. The gospels of Luke and Mark include brief mentions of the Ascension, but the main references to it are elsewhere in the New Testament.

The four gospels have variations in their account of the resurrection of Jesus and his appearances, but there are four points at which all gospels converge: the turning of the stone that had closed the tomb, the visit of the women on "the first day of the week;" that the risen Jesus chose first to appear to women and told them to inform the other disciples; the prominence of Mary Magdalene in the accounts. Variants have to do with the precise time the women visited the tomb, the number and identity of the women; the purpose of their visit; the appearance of the messengers—angelic or human; their message to the women; and the response of the women.

In Matthew 28:5, Mark 16:5, Luke 24:4 and John 20:12 his resurrection is announced and explained to the followers who arrive there early in the morning by either one or two beings (either men or angels) dressed in bright robes who appear in or near the tomb. The gospel accounts vary as to who arrived at the tomb first, but they are women and are instructed by the risen Jesus to inform the other disciples. All four accounts include Mary Magdalene and three include Mary, mother of James. The accounts of Mark 16:9, John 20:15 indicate that Jesus appeared to the Magdalene first, and Luke 16:9 states that she was among the Myrrhbearers who informed the disciples about the resurrection. In Matthew 28:11–15, to explain the empty tomb, the Jewish elders bribe the soldiers who had guarded the tomb to spread the rumor that Jesus' disciples took his body.

=== Resurrection appearances ===
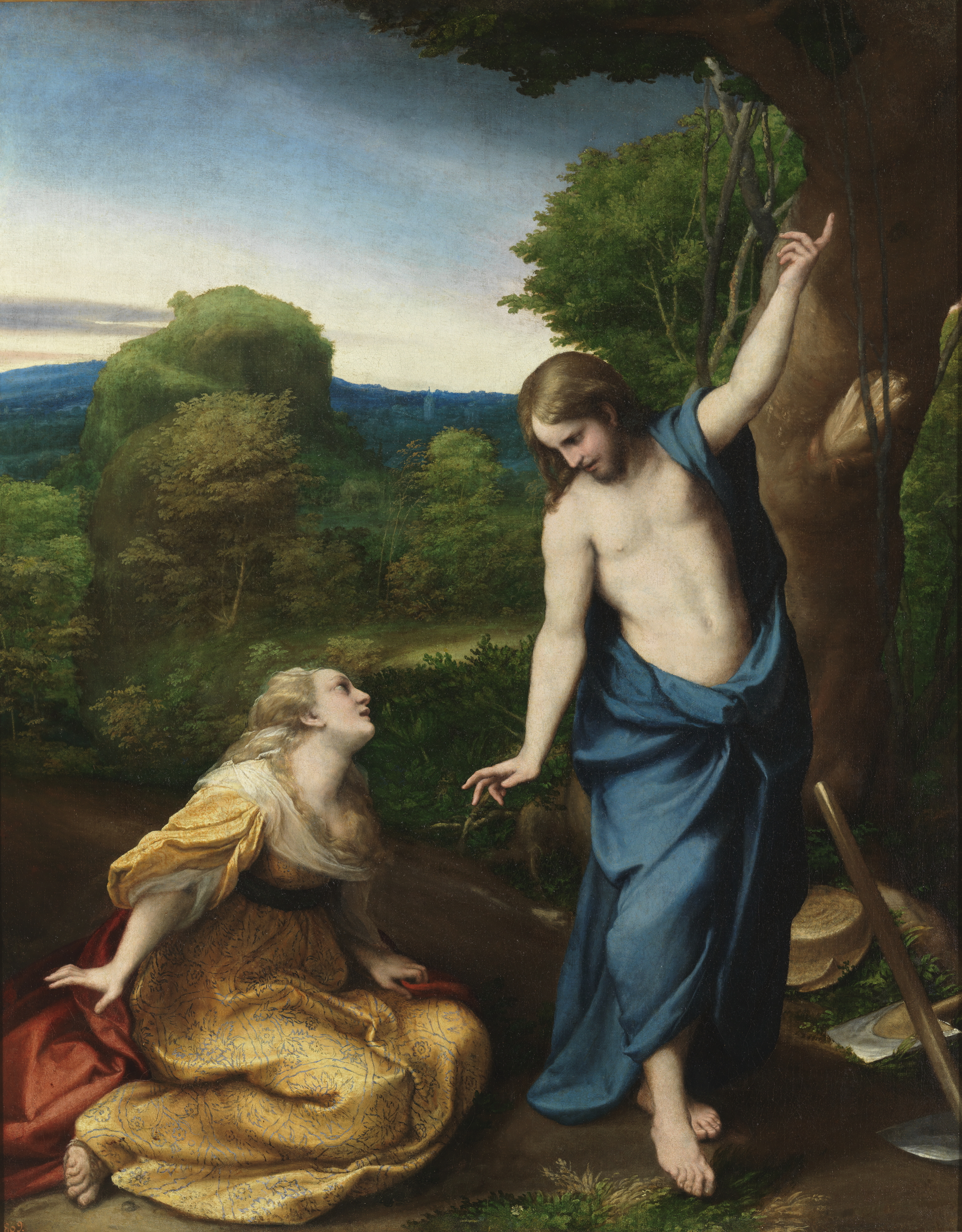
Noli me Tangere by Antonio da Correggio, c. 1534

In John 20:15–17 Jesus appears to Mary Magdalene soon after his resurrection. At first she does not recognize him and thinks that he is the gardener. When he says her name, she recognizes him yet he tells her "do not touch me, for I am not yet ascended to my Father."

Later that day, at evening, Jesus appears to the disciples and shows them the wounds in his hands and his side in John 20:19–21. Thomas the Apostle is not present at that meeting and later expresses doubt about the resurrection of Jesus. As Thomas is expressing his doubts, in the well known Doubting Thomas episode in John 20:24–29 Jesus appears to him and invites him to put his finger into the holes made by the wounds in Jesus' hands and side. Thomas then professes his faith in Jesus. In Matthew 28:16–20, in the Great Commission Jesus appears to his followers on a mountain in Galilee and calls on them to baptize all nations in the name of the "Father, Son, and Holy Spirit".

Luke 24:13–32 narrates the Road to Emmaus appearance, in which a disciple named Cleopas and a companion were on their way to Emmaus when they met Jesus, who later has supper with them. Mark 16:12–13 has a similar account that describes the appearance of Jesus to two disciples while they were walking in the country, at about the same time in the Gospel narrative. In the Miraculous catch of 153 fish Jesus appears to his disciples on the Sea of Galilee, and thereafter Jesus encourages the Apostle Peter to serve his followers. In 1 Corinthians 15:6–7, the Apostle Paul references an appearance of Jesus to "more than five hundred of the brothers and sisters at the same time," along with an appearance to "James" separate from those to the other apostles.

=== Ascension ===
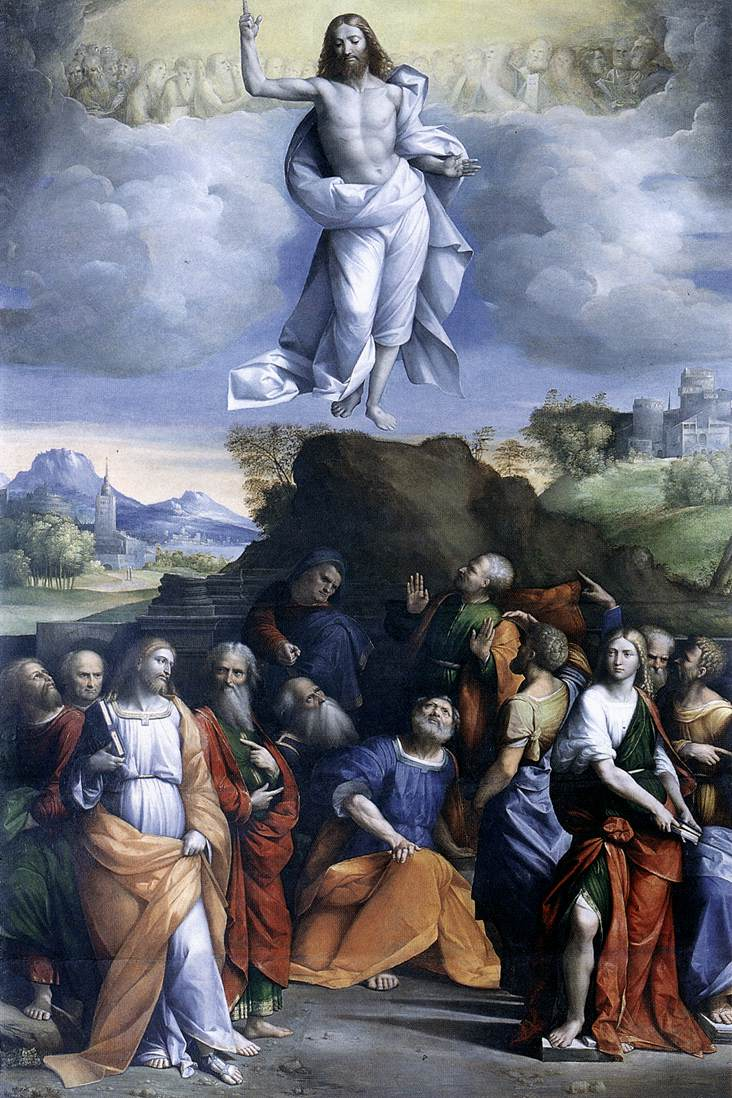
Ascension of Christ by Garofalo (1520)

The Ascension of Jesus (anglicized from the Vulgate Latin Acts 1:9-11 section title: Ascensio Iesu) is the Christian teaching found in New Testament that Jesus was taken up to heaven in his resurrected body, in the presence of eleven of his apostles, occurring 40 days after the resurrection. In the biblical narrative, an angel tells the watching disciples that Jesus' second coming will take place in the same manner as his ascension.

The canonical gospels include two brief descriptions of the Ascension of Jesus in Luke 24:50–53 and Mark 16:19, in which it takes place on Easter Sunday. A more detailed account of Jesus' bodily Ascension into the clouds is given in the Acts of the Apostles (1:9–11) where the narrative starts with the account of Jesus' appearances after his resurrection and describes the event as taking place forty days later.

Acts 1:9–12 specifies the location of the Ascension as the "mount called Olivet" near Jerusalem. Acts 1:3 states that Jesus: "showed himself alive after his passion by many proofs, appearing unto them by the space of forty days, and speaking the things concerning the kingdom of God". After giving a number of instructions to the apostles Acts 1:9 describes the Ascension as follows: "And when he had said these things, as they were looking, he was taken up; and a cloud received him out of their sight." Following this two men clothed in white appear and tell the apostles that Jesus will return in the same manner as he was taken, and the apostles return to Jerusalem.

In Acts 2:30–33, Ephesians 4:8–10 and 1 Timothy 3:16 (where Jesus as taken up in glory) the Ascension is spoken of as an accepted fact, while Hebrews 10:12 describes Jesus as seated in heaven.

== See also ==
Gospels, chronology and historicity

- Baptism of Jesus
- Chronology of Jesus
- Gospel harmony
- Historical Jesus
- Jesus in Christianity
- Life of Christ in art
- Life of Christ Museum
- Ministry of Jesus
- Timeline of Christianity
- Timeline of the Bible

Associated sites

- Ænon
- Al Maghtas
- Bethabara
- New Testament places associated with Jesus
- Qasr el Yahud
