= 1952 (disambiguation) =

1952 is a year in the Gregorian calendar.

1952 may also refer to:

- 1952 (album), a 1995 album by Soul-Junk
- 1952: Ivan i Aleksandra, original title of Bulgarian film Ivan and Alexandra
- 1952 Hesburgh, an asteroid
- 1952 TM, alternative name for 14 Irene, an asteroid
- 1952 BC, a year in the 20th century BC
