= 1941 (disambiguation) =

1941 is a year.

1941 may also refer to:

- 1941 (film), a 1979 period comedy film by Steven Spielberg
- 1941: Counter Attack, a 1990 video game
- 1941 (EP), a 2001 EP by Soul-Junk
- "1941", a song by Harry Nilsson from the 1967 album Pandemonium Shadow Show
