= 1942 (disambiguation) =

1942 is a year.

1942 may also refer to:

- 1942 (video game), video game made by Capcom
  - 1942: Joint Strike, downloadable game for Xbox Live Arcade & PlayStation Network
- 1942 (board game), a 1978 board wargame about the World War II Pacific Theatre
- 1942: A Love Story, 1994 Indian period romance film by Vidhu Vinod Chopra
- 1942 (EP), a 2001 EP release from Soul-Junk
- 1942 (novel), an alternate history novel written by Robert Conroy
- "1942" (song), a 2018 song by G-Eazy
- "1942", a song by PartyNextDoor from PartyNextDoor 3
