= Pilate's court =

Trial of Jesus in praetorium before Pontius Pilate

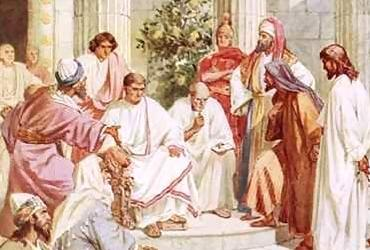
Jesus and Pilate by William Hole

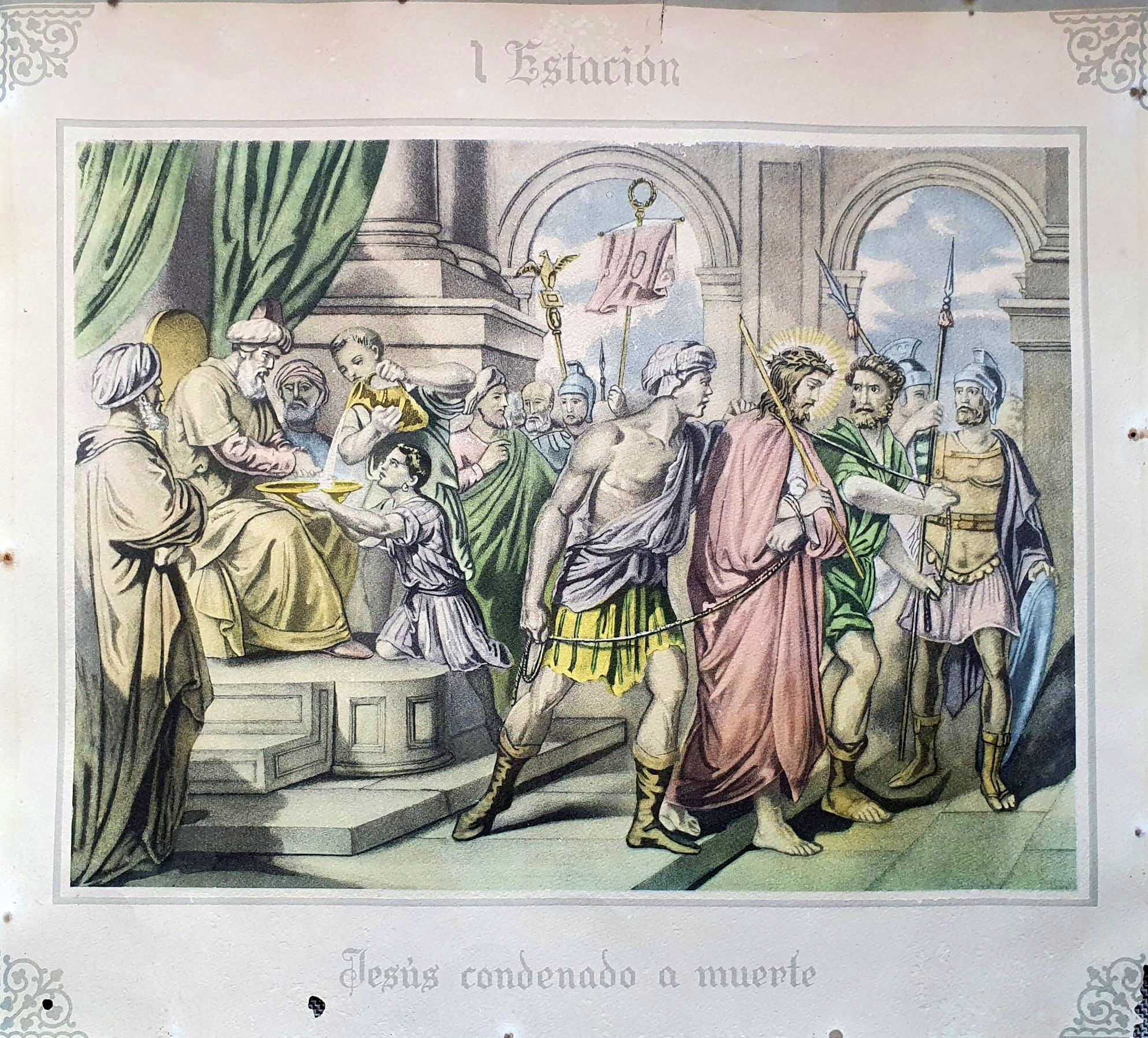
Judgment of Jesus. 1st Station of the Calvary of the Church of Nuestra Señora de la Asunción in Villamelendro de Valdavia.

In the canonical gospels, Pilate's court refers to the appearance of Jesus before Pontius Pilate in the praetorium of Jerusalem. According to the Gospel of Luke, Jewish leaders brought Jesus to Pilate on accusations of rebellion. After questioning him and finding no evidence of guilt, Pilate determined that, as a Galilean, Jesus fell under Herod Antipas's jurisdiction and sent Jesus to Herod. Herod likewise found Jesus to be no threat and returned him to Pilate, who again confronted the Jewish leaders' demands for crucifixion. Despite agreeing with Herod's judgment, Pilate lets Jesus be crucified simply to satisfy either a crowd before his residence (Matthew, Mark and Luke) or the high priests standing there (John), all of whom demanded Jesus's crucifixion.

== Background ==
As prefect of Roman Judea, Pilate was subordinate to the Roman legate in Syria. Pilate resided on the coast at Caesarea Maritima. On those occasions when he had to be in Jerusalem, he used the palace compound built by Herod the Great as his praetorium or headquarters. The palace was located in the western part of the upper city and served as both a comfortable residence and fortress.

Early pilgrims to Jerusalem generally identified the praetorium with the Antonia Fortress, where the traditional Way of the Cross begins. However, the archaeological evidence, which dates the fortress remnants to the 2nd century CE, as well as the tense situation requiring Pilate to be near the Second Temple as the center of Passover activity, support the Herod's Palace location.

The Gospel of Mark uses the word aulē ("hall", "palace") to identify the praetorium. Fearing defilement, the Sanhedrin elders did not enter the court, and Pilate's discussion with them occurred outside the praetorium. Outside the praetorium proper, there was an area called the Pavement. Pilate's judgement seat (Greek: bēma), in which he conversed with the elders, was located there.

== Gospel narratives ==
=== Overview ===
The trial of Jesus is retold in all four canonical gospels, in Matthew 26:57–27:31, Mark 14:53–15:20, Luke 22:54–23:26, and John 18:13–19:16. The trial can be subdivided into four episodes:

1. the Sanhedrin trial of Jesus (before Caiaphas or Annas);
2. the trial of Jesus at Pilate's court (according to Luke also briefly at the court of Herod Antipas);
3. Pilate's consideration of the crowd's opinion to give Barabbas amnesty and condemn Jesus to death; and
4. the abduction of Jesus by Roman soldiers (according to John the chief priests) and the mistreatment and/or mocking of Jesus (according to Luke and John, this happened before Jesus was condemned by Pilate, according to Mark and Matthew not until after his condemnation).

In all four gospels, the Denial of Peter functions as an additional narrative during the Sanhedrin trial, while Matthew adds an addition during the trial before Pilate where the gospel narrates the suicide of Judas Iscariot.

The Sanhedrin, as provincial authorities, could not themselves prosecute offences against Roman rule, and the priests therefore took Jesus to Pilate for that purpose. From their three accusations (perverting the nation, forbidding the payment of tribute, and sedition against the Roman Empire), Pilate picked up on the third one, asking: "Are you the King of the Jews?". Jesus replied with "You have said so". Jesus answered further that his kingdom was not worldly and he offered only truth, leading Pilate to ask "What is truth?" He did not wait for an answer: J. B. Phillips indicates that Pilate "went straight out again", and Francis Bacon suggested that Pilate was "jesting" when he asked the question.

Outside, Pilate declared that he found no basis to charge Jesus, asking the crowd if they wanted Jesus freed. They demanded instead the release of Barabbas and called for Jesus's death. Fearing a revolt, Pilate relented. The universal rule of the Roman Empire limited capital punishment strictly to the tribunal of the Roman governor, and Pilate decided to publicly wash his hands as not being party to Jesus's death. Nevertheless, since only the Roman authority could order crucifixion and since the penalty was carried out by Roman soldiers, Pilate was responsible, a judgment Reynolds Price describes as an exercise in skillful backwater diplomacy.

== Commentary ==
Philo, who held a negative view of Pilate, mentions him ordering executions without trials.

In later Christian interpretation of the trial scene, particularly in the Gospel of John, responsibility for Jesus’ condemnation is increasingly attributed to Jewish authorities, while Pilate is portrayed as repeatedly affirming Jesus’ innocence and attempting to release him. This narrative shift effectively exonerates Pilate by emphasizing that Jesus was handed over to Roman authority by others, a tendency that intensifies in the early second-century Gospel of Peter, where Pilate is depicted sympathetically and as aligned with figures close to Jesus. By the third century, some Church Fathers, including Tertullian and Origen, went further by presenting Pilate in an overtly favorable light, even portraying him as a Christian, reflecting an apologetic strategy that defended Roman authority while transferring blame away from it.

Archaeologist Shimon Gibson argues that recent excavations have uncovered a monumental gateway on the western side of Herod's palace (the praetorium) which could be the place where the trial of Jesus took place. He also notes that "these archeological remains fit very well with John's description of the place of Jesus' temporary incarceration and the trial in front of Pilate, and with the two topographical features that are mentioned by him, the lithostrotos and gabbatha."

== Narrative comparison ==
The following comparison table is primarily based on the New International Version (NIV) English translation of the New Testament.

	Matthew	Mark	Luke	John
Sanhedrin trial before Caiaphas (Matthew, Mark, Luke) or Annas (John)	Matthew 26:57–67: Jesus taken to Caiaphas' court.; Sanhedrin brought forth false witnesses.; Jesus remained silent. Caiaphas: 'Are you the Messiah, the Son of God?'; Jesus: 'You say so, but from now on you will see the Son of Man next to the Mighty One and coming on the clouds of heaven.'; Caiaphas tore his clothes and said: 'Blasphemy! Who needs more witnesses, now you have heard the blasphemy! What do you think?'; The rest answered: 'He is worthy of death!'; Jesus spat on and beaten. 'Prophesy, who hit you, Messiah?'; Denial of Peter.	Mark 14:53–65: Jesus taken to the high priest.; Sanhedrin brought forth false witnesses.; Jesus remained silent. High priest: 'Are you the Messiah, the Son of the Blessed One?'; Jesus: 'I am, and you will see the Son of Man next to the Mighty One and coming on the clouds of heaven.'; High priest tore his clothes: 'Who needs more witnesses, now you have heard the blasphemy! What do you think?'; They all condemned him as worthy of death.; Jesus spat on, blindfolded and beaten. 'Prophesy!'; Denial of Peter.	Luke 22:54–71: Jesus taken to high priest's house.; Denial of Peter.; Jesus mocked and beaten. Blindfolded and asked: 'Prophesy! Who hit you?'; At daybreak, Sanhedrin asked Jesus if he is the Messiah.; Jesus: 'You won't believe me, but from now on the Son of Man will be next to the power of God.'; All: 'Are you then the Son of God?'; Jesus: 'You say that I am.'; All: 'Who needs more testimony? We've heard him say it himself!'	John 18:13–28: Jesus taken to Annas' court.; Denial of Peter (part 1).; Annas questioned Jesus about his disciples and teaching.; Jesus told Annas about his ministry.; Officer of Annas slapped Jesus, who asked him why.; Annas sent Jesus, bound, to Caiaphas.; Denial of Peter (part 2).; Jesus taken from Caiaphas to Pilate.
Trial before Pilate (Luke: and also before Herod Antipas)	Matthew 27:1–14: Early in the morning the chief priests and elders planned to have Jesus executed.; Judas regretted, threw back the thirty pieces of silver into the Temple and hanged himself.; Pilate: 'Are you the king of the Jews?' Jesus: 'You have said so.'; Jesus otherwise remained silent, which amazed Pilate.	Mark 15:1–5: Very early in the morning the chief priests, elders, law teachers and Sanhedrin made plans, bound Jesus and took him to Pilate.; Pilate: 'Are you the king of the Jews?' Jesus: 'You have said so.'; Jesus otherwise remained silent, which amazed Pilate.	Luke 23:1–12: The whole assembly rose and took Jesus to Pilate.; They accused Jesus of subverting the nation, opposing Roman taxes, and claiming to be Messiah, a king.; Pilate: 'Are you the king of the Jews?' Jesus: 'You have said so.'; Pilate: 'I find no guilt in this man.'; They: 'He came from Galilee stirring up people all over Judea by his teaching!'; Pilate sent Jesus to Herod Antipas because he was a Galilean.; Herod – also in Jerusalem at the time – was pleased to see Jesus, but Jesus didn't answer his questions. The chief priests and law teachers accused Jesus. Herod and his soldiers then mocked Jesus, put an elegant robe on him and sent him back to Pilate.	John 18:28–38: Early in the morning Jesus was taken to Pilate by the Jewish leaders, who refused to enter the praetorium to stay ceremonially clean for Passover.; Pilate came out and asked them why. They said only Pilate could apply the death penalty.; Pilate, inside: 'Are you the king of the Jews?' Jesus: 'My kingdom is not of this world, otherwise my servants would have fought to prevent my arrest by the Jewish leaders.'; Pilate: 'You are a king, then!' Jesus: 'You say that I am a king. In fact, the reason I was born and came into the world is to testify to the truth. Everyone on the side of truth listens to me.' Pilate: 'What is truth?'; Pilate, outside: 'I find no guilt in him.'
Jesus versus Barabbas	Matthew 27:15–26: Narrator explains the amnesty vote and Barabbas.; Pilate asked crowd: 'Should I release Barabbas or Jesus 'the Messiah'?'; Pilate's wife begged him to release Jesus. Chief priests and elders persuaded the crowd against Jesus.; Pilate asked crowd: 'Who should I release?' Crowd: 'Barabbas!'; Pilate: 'What should I do with Jesus?' Crowd: 'Crucify him!'; Pilate: 'What crime has he committed then?' Crowd, louder: 'Crucify him!'; Pilate washed his hands of guilt and said: 'I'm innocent of this man's blood, it's your responsibility!' Crowd: 'His blood is on us and on our children!'; Pilate released Barabbas, had Jesus flogged and abducted.	Mark 15:6–15: Narrator explains the amnesty vote and Barabbas.; Pilate asked crowd: 'Do you want me to release the king of the Jews?'; Chief priests stirred up the crowd to release Barabbas.; Pilate: 'What shall I do, then, with the one you call the king of the Jews?' Crowd: 'Crucify him!'; Pilate: 'What crime has he committed then?' Crowd, louder: 'Crucify him!'; Pilate released Barabbas, had Jesus flogged and abducted.	Luke 23:13–25: Pilate tells chief priests and rulers: 'I've found Jesus not guilty, neither has Herod. So I will flog him and release him.'; But the crowd shouted: 'Away with him! Release Barabbas!'; Narrator explains Barabbas.; Pilate tried to appeal for Jesus's release and repeated his not guilty verdict, but due to insistent loud shouting for crucifixion, Pilate gave in to their demand.; Pilate released Barabbas, had Jesus abducted.	John 18:39–19:16: Pilate explained the amnesty vote and asked: 'Do you want me to release 'the king of the Jews'?'; They shouted back: 'No, not him! Give us Barabbas!' Narrator explains Barrabas.; Pilate had Jesus flogged.; Soldiers put a purple robe and a crown of thorns on Jesus.; Soldiers called out to Jesus: 'Hail, king of the Jews!'; They struck him with their hands.; Pilate, outside, repeated his not guilty verdict and presented Jesus: 'Here is the man!'; Chief priests and officials shouted: 'Crucify! Crucify!' Pilate: 'Go ahead and crucify him. I myself find no guilt in him.' Jewish leaders: 'Our law says he must die because he claimed to be the Son of God.'; Pilate, afraid, interrogated Jesus inside. Jesus: 'You would have no power over me if it were not given to you from above. Therefore the one who handed me over to you is guilty of a greater sin.' Pilate tried to set Jesus free.; Jewish leaders: 'If you let him go, you disobey Caesar. Anyone who claims to be a king opposes Caesar.'; Pilate brought out Jesus around noon, saying: 'Here is your king.' They shouted: 'Take him away, crucify him!'; Pilate: 'Shall I crucify your king?' Chief priests: 'We have no king but Caesar.'; Pilate had Jesus abducted.
Jesus abducted for crucifixion	Matthew 27:27–31: Roman soldiers took Jesus into the praetorium.; Soldiers undressed Jesus and put a scarlet robe, a crown of thorns and a staff on him.; Soldiers knelt in front of Jesus and mocked him saying: 'Hail, king of the Jews!'; They spit on him, took the staff and struck his head.; They took off the robe, put his clothes back on and led him away.	Mark 15:16–20: Roman soldiers took Jesus into the praetorium.; Soldiers put a purple robe and a crown of thorns on Jesus.; Soldiers called out to Jesus: 'Hail, king of the Jews!'; They struck his head with a staff, spit on him and knelt in homage to him.; After mocking, they took off the purple robe, put his clothes back on, led him outside and away.	Luke 23:26–36: Jesus led away by both chief priests and Roman soldiers.; [No mistreatment by soldiers]	John 19:17–23: Jesus led away by both chief priests and Roman soldiers.; [No further mistreatment by soldiers]

=== Chronological comparison ===
Approximate chronological comparison between the Jesus Passion narratives according to the Gospels of Mark and John. Each section ('1' to '28') represents three hours of time.

== See also ==
- Blood curse
- Chronology of Jesus
- Ecce homo
- Life of Jesus in the New Testament
