= 1955 (album) =

Studio album by Soul-Junk
- Released: January 1, 1998
- Recorded: DML Studios
- Genre: Experimental rock, experimental hip hop, abstract hip hop, electronic rock, noise rock, indie rock
- Length: 2:29:01
- Label: Jackson Rubio

Soul-Junk chronology
1954 (1996)	1955 (1998)	1956 (2000)

1955 is a 1998 hip hop music album by Soul-Junk. Musically, the album is the most centred between the low-fi and hip hop eras of Soul-Junk; as put by CCM Magazine "trip-hop meets folk meets retro rock." As with many Soul-Junk albums, the Biblical references from which the lyrics are drawn are listed in the liner. 1955 has a length of about two-and-a-half hours, which was cut from about six hours of material.

== Track listing ==
Disc A
No.	Title	Biblical Reference	Length
1.	"Rebel Syphon"
2.	"Universal Two-Day City"
3.	"Pack of Goons"
4.	"May My Tongue Be Stuck up on the Roof"	Psalms 137
5.	"Velodrome?"
6.	"Prophecies"
7.	"Old Dominion"	John 1:4-18
8.	"Straight from Neptune"	Luke 19:41-44, Matthew 16:1-3, Mark 1:14-15
9.	"Double-O Javelin"	Matthew 25:1-13
10.	"Blunderbuss"
11.	"Thrown Down"	Revelation 18
12.	"Cherry Stereo Chariot"	Luke 10:25-37
13.	"Moonbeam?"
14.	"All Men Are Grass"	John 1:23, Isaiah 40:1-11
15.	"Glowing Funeral"
16.	"As the Rain"	Isaiah 55:6-11
17.	"Transubstantial Peel-Out"

Disc AA
No.	Title	Biblical Reference	Length
18.	"See His Face"	Numbers 6:22-27, 2 Thessalonians 2:16-17 & 3:16
19.	"More of the Illusory Doorprize"
20.	"Gorilla in the Mix"
21.	"April 42nd"	Colossians 2:8-23
22.	"Numb Live & Looser"
23.	"Quasars?"	John 2:13-16
24.	"Subwoof Ape Job"
25.	"Yellow Tooth Youth"	Jeremiah 30:21-22, James 4:1-10
26.	"THE Auriginal Manglist"
27.	"Down with Sounds"	Isaiah 30:27-32, Psalm 126:1-3
28.	"All Lids"	Psalms 63:1-5 & 62:1
29.	"Some True Blue Gum from Seething Teeth"
30.	"Turn on the Solar"	Isaiah 32:13-33:11
31.	"Lazy Rattlesnake"

== Personnel ==
- Glen Galaxy - Guitar, vocals, inside cover artwork
- Jon Galaxy - Bass, Science
- Ron Easterbrooks - Guitar, vocals
- Nathan Poage - Drums
- Chuck P. - knobs
- Mia Of The Lion - vocals
- Rachel Smith - vocals
