= 1937 (album) =

Remix album by Soul-Junk
- Released: November 1, 2005
- Recorded: October–November 2003
- Genres: Electronic, Glitch hop, experimental hip hop, Illbient
- Label: Sounds Are Active

Soul-Junk chronology
1938 (2002)	1937 (2005)

Professional ratings
Review scores
Source	Rating
Prefix Mag	(7.0/10)
The Phantom Tollbooth	2/5 stars

1937 is a remix album released in 2005 on Sounds Are Active by the avant-garde group Soul-Junk.

== Track listing ==
1. "Opidish" – 0:31
  - (Slo-Ro Vs. M.C. Ponderosa remix)
2. "Begollar Tempus" – 3:58
  - (Aelters remix)
  - p&c e.alters at home, Oct – Nov 2003
3. "Seahorse Posing As Colorform" – 3:45
  - (Create (!) Vs. Accident remix)
  - Orlando Greenhill – Electric bass
  - Andrew Pompey – acoustic drums
  - Chris Schlarb – acoustic piano
  - Produced by Accident
4. "Poolfullofstatic" – 3:04
  - (Hairspray Or No? remix)
5. "Aiming Narrow" – 2:49
  - (Wobbly remix)
6. "Jammy July Pike Remix" – 2:56
  - ([Drekka] remix)
  - Drekka appears courtesy of Bluesanct
7. "Hornfront" – 3:06
  - (Poison Arrows remix)
8. "Soul Structures Sourced" – 4:46
  - (Stephen Ruiz remix)
9. "Atari Atari" – 5:11
  - (Professor Kermit / Anish Vyas remix)
  - Anish Vyas on Bass
10. "Jibjob" – 3:15
  - (Matt Davignon remix)
11. "NOVA" – 3:45
  - (Soul-Junk/Evig Poesi remix)
12. "Ungst Func Slang Collision" – 3:35
  - (Dev79 remix)
  - Remixed at seclusiasis studio
13. "Totale" – 4:13
  - (Looproad "Ruby Doomsday" remix)
14. "Creech" – 1:59
  - (Soul-Junk remix)
15. "Non-Linear" – 4:25
  - (Jason Talbot remix)
16. "Organ Air" – 10:29
  - (Patagonia remix)
17. "Clarks Green" – 1:37
  - (Therefore remix)
18. "Canhop" – 4:10
  - (Leafcutter John remix)
19. "Wack M.C." – 6:17
  - (Soul-Junk remix)

== Production credits ==
- Artwork by Paul Goode and Jonathan Dueck
- Curated by Slo-Ro
- Mastered by Rafter Roberts
