= 1953 (album) =

Studio album by Soul-Junk
- Released: 1996
- Recorded: July 1995–July 1996; DML studios, Daydream Studios
- Genres: Indie rock, noise rock
- Label: Homestead Records
- Producer: Bill Day

Soul-Junk chronology
1952 (1995)	1953 (1996)	1954 (1996)

1953 is an indie rock album by Soul-Junk released in 1996. The album consists of guitar based low-fi rock, which one reviewer described as being in the ballpark of "Beck meets Danielson." Alternative Press found their musical arrangements to be outstanding, "tuneful, energetic and original", but took fault with their lyrics, which many of which are derived from scripture.

The final track of the album is actually another album itself, 1954, albeit uncut.

== Track listing ==
Track Name
Biblical Reference
1. Junca De Sol Andromeda
2. Quite Alright Rockers
John 10:7-18
- Recorded by: Bill Day (Daydream Studios)
3. Shine Out
Psalm 80
4. Atonal Eternal!

5. Young Businessmens Psykick Makeout
Matthew 13:44-52
6. Poker of the Eye
Luke 10:1-24
7. Wax Presidential
Isaiah 8:16-20, Revelation 19:10
8. Bloody Men
Psalm 26
- Written by Ron Easterbrooks
9. Three Thousand Thirsty Thoughts

- Recorded & Mixed by: Bill Day (Daydream Studios)
10. The Lion Has Roared
Amos 3:2-8
11. Some Pampered Gangster
Ephesians 5:8-18, Luke 11:34-36
12. Sturdy Jive
Isaiah 35
- Written by Ron Easterbrooks
- Jennifer Easterbrooks: Background vocals
13. Graveyard-Style

14. Soul-Junk 1954

== Credits ==
- Glen Galaxy (Vocals, guitar, sax)
- Jon Galaxy (Bass)
- Brian Cantrell (Drums, electronic percussion)
- Ron Easterbrooks (Guitar, drums)
- All tracks recorded and mixed by Scott Exum at DML studios unless otherwise noted.
