= 1957 (album) =

Studio album by Soul-Junk
- Released: November 5, 2002
- Genre: Experimental hip hop
- Labels: Sounds Are Active, Holy Kiss Rex

Soul-Junk chronology
1956 (2000)	1957 (2002)	1958 (2003)

Professional ratings
Review scores
Source	Rating
Pitchfork	(7.0/10)
The Phantom Tollbooth	3.5/5 stars

1957 is the eighth studio album by the experimental band Soul-Junk. It was released on November 5, 2002 through Sounds Familyre Records.

== Track listing ==
1. Phalanx
2. Non-Linear
3. Jelly Wings
4. Gotham
5. Ungst Func Slag Collision
6. Innerspacemen
7. Droptop Floride
8. Horse Posing As Unicorn
9. Ruby Doomsday
  - 2 Thessalonians 2
10. Mercury
11. Jammy July Pike
12. Rap City Ark
13. Uqbar Orbis
14. Vesuvius

== Credits ==
- Glen Galaxy
- Slo-Ro
- Tracking: Tim Coffman
- Overbuddy: Ero Thompson
- Mastering: Rafter Roberts
- "Girl Singer:" O.B.M.
- Artwork: Paul Goode
