= Soul-Junk =

American hip hop group

Soul Junk
- Origin: San Diego, California
- Genres: Experimental, Christian hip hop
- Years active: 1993–present
- Labels: Sounds Are Active; Shrimper; 5 Minute Walk; Jackson Rubio; Homestead; Holy Kiss; Rex; Sub Pop; Karate; InTransit; Quiver Society!
- Members: Glen Galaxy
- Website: souljunk.com

Soul-Junk is an experimental genre-hopping Christian rock and hip hop group from San Diego, California.

== Background ==
The roots of Soul-Junk began in 1993 when Glen Galloway began experimenting while touring in Europe with his rock band Trumans Water. By the time Trumans Water moved to Portland, Oregon in 1994 he had already left and concentrated on Soul-Junk as a full-time independent solo project, eventually taking the moniker Glen Galaxy. Influences on the group's early music include Nation of Ulysses, Sonic Youth, and Can. Galloway had been raised as a Presbyterian but had been an outspoken atheist since leaving home for school. Shortly before joining Trumans Water, however, he had returned to Christianity; later telling his bandmates God had called him to leave the band.

=== Musical Evolution ===
Early Soul-Junk albums (such as 1950) almost exclusively feature low-fi, Indie rock style tracks of Glen singing Bible verses interlaced with instrumental noise tracks, with a similarity to his previous band but with overtly Christian lyrics. As Soul-Junk gained members its sound advanced toward rock and pop. 1953 and 1954 show signs of this continual change. Alternative Press stated in a review of 1953 that their indie musical arrangements are outstanding, "tuneful, energetic and original (almost to a fault)." 1955 is transitional, both in terms of Soul-Junk's sound and market stance. Like previous releases most of the lyrics came directly from the Bible, but 1955 was their first album released on a Christian record label. The double-disk set consists of pop / Indie rock / hip hop influenced sounds. It is also the last disk to make extensive use of Biblical quotes before 1959.

The whole point is to make something that people would want to puzzle over

— Galaxalag on Soul-Junk's music in CCM Magazine

While there are fewer lyrics derived from scripture, the albums 1956 through 1958 still reflect on the groups' Christianity based viewpoint, sometimes offering critiques of the Church in a stream-of consciousness manner. On 1956 the sound shifts toward hip hop, leading CCM Magazine to describe it as "beyond offbeat, beyond eclectic... beyond the grasp of its market." This position is intentional according to Galaxy, who seeks to reach a wider audience than simply the church, and states "We do need to rock the boat... I dont particularly want anyone to think they know what they can expect from Soul-Junk."

The albums 1957 and 1958 are based in experimental, abstract hip-hop which sometimes adds elements of "avant-jazz." Glen explained this period to HM Magazine, stating "energy-wise I'm feeling the drum n' bass, I'm feeling chaotic turntablism. But texture-wise I was feeling hip-hop." The resulting sound is fragmented; Soul Junk's "berserk-hop" on these albums is "hip-hop so out-there, so deconstructed, so avant-garde" that it creates a "carnival aesthetic".

Between 2003 and 2007, no albums were released. Instead, Glen embarked on an effort to put the entire text of the Bible to music. The first results are 1959 (released in 2007) which consists of Psalms 1-23 verbatim, and "1960" (released in 2009) which consists of all 22 sub-chapters of Psalms 119. Glen has also released the entire Book of Genesis through his web site. Shortly after recording 1960 (with Daniel Smith from Danielson Famile), Glen started playing with his son Jude on drums and daughter Mila. His brother Jon returned on bass, and his brother Brian started playing keyboards and guitar.

== Recurring members ==
- Glen Galaxy
- Jude Galaxy
- Mila Galaxy
- Jon Galaxy
- Brian Galaxy
- Slo-Ro (2001–2005)
- Brian Cantrell (1995–2000)
- DJ Mizzicah (1997–2003)
- Ron Easterbrooks (1995–1998)
- Nathan Poage (1998–2000)

Many others are credited per album or track.

== Discography ==
=== Album naming convention ===
The first Soul-Junk release was called 1950. Its name was derived from the musical style of the era, a fusion of rock and free-jazz. According to Glen, "1950...was a good year for music". Subsequent albums have been numbered up from 1950; Extended Play releases have been numbered down, but further numbering does not reflect the music of those years. Soul-Junk songs have also been released on many compilations.

=== Albums ===
- 1950 (1994)
- 1951 (1995)
- 1952 (1995)
- 1953 (1996)
- 1954 (1996)
- 1955 (1998)
- 1956 (2000)
- 1957 (2002)
- 1958 (2003)
- 1959 (2007)
- 1960 (2009)
- 1961 (2012)

=== EPs ===
- 1949 (1994)
- 1948 (recorded but not yet released)
- 1947 (1995)
- 1946 (1995)
- 1945 (1994)
- 1944 (1996)
- 1943 (2000)
- 1942 (2001)
- 1941 (2001)
- 1940 (2002, 2003)
- 1939 (2002)
- 1938 (2002)
- 1937 (2005)
- 1936 (2008)
- 1935 (2008)
