= Blood curse =

Reference to a New Testament narrative

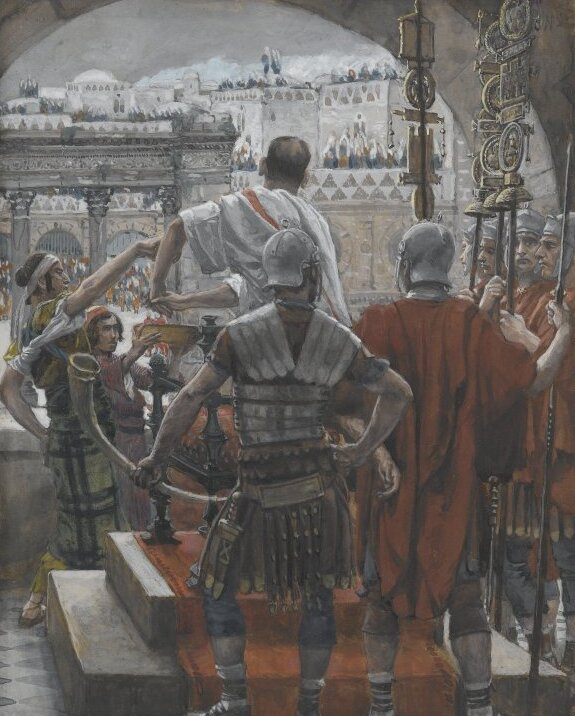
Late-19th century painting of Pontius Pilate washing his hands, a major event in the passage

The term "blood curse" refers to a New Testament passage from the Gospel of Matthew, Chapter 27, which describes events taking place in Pilate's court before the crucifixion of Jesus, and specifically the alleged willingness of the Jewish crowd to accept liability for Jesus' death.

== Biblical narrative ==
Matthew 27:24–25 reads:

So when Pilate saw that he was gaining nothing, but rather that a riot was beginning, he took water and washed his hands before the crowd, saying "I am innocent of this man’s blood; see to it yourselves." And all the people answered, "His blood be on us and on our children!" (Greek: Τὸ αἷμα αὐτοῦ ἐφ’ ἡμᾶς καὶ ἐπὶ τὰ τέκνα ἡμῶν.)

== Interpretation ==
The scene appears only in Matthew, with parallel accounts in Mark 15, Luke 23, and John 19 showing Pilate yielding to pressure, the crowd choosing Barabbas, and the demand for crucifixion, but they omit these details. The passage has no counterpart in the other Gospels and is probably related to the destruction of Jerusalem in the year 70 CE. German Protestant theologian Ulrich Luz (b. 1938) describes it as "redactional fiction" invented by the author of the Matthew Gospel. Some writers, viewing it as part of Matthew's anti-Jewish polemic, see in it the seeds of later Christian antisemitism. In the view of the New Zealand academic Graham Stanton, a New Testament scholar in the Reformed tradition, "Matthew's anti-Jewish polemic should be seen as part of the self-definition of the Christian minority which is acutely aware of the rejection and hostility of its 'mother' Judaism." Howard Clark Kee has written, "The bitter words he [Matthew] attributes to the Jews have caused endless harm in arrousing anti-Jewish emotions." The Presbyterian New Testament scholar and theologian Donald Hagner has written "It cannot be denied that this statement, unfortunately, has been used to promote anti-Semitism. The statement is formulaic, and the reference to 'our children' does not make them guilty of the death of Jesus, let alone children or Jews of later generations." Historian Paula Fredriksen has noted that the verse's reference to "us and our children" maps onto the two generation of Jerusalemites who were alive when the Romans destroyed the city and its temple.

=== Anglican views ===
The Anglican New Testament scholar and theologian N. T. Wright has stated "The tragic and horrible later use of Matthew 27.25 ('his blood be on us, and on our children') as an excuse for soi-disant 'Christian' anti-semitism is a gross distortion of its original meaning, where the reference is surely to the fall of Jerusalem."

Anglican theologian Rowan Williams, then Archbishop of Wales, and who would soon become Archbishop of Canterbury, has written of Matthew's Gospel being made "the tool of the most corrupt and murderous misreading of the passion stories that has disfigured the Church's record".

The evangelist's bitterness at the schism within God's people that continues in his own day, his impatience with the refusal of the Jewish majority to accept the preaching of Jesus, overflows into this symbolic self-denunciation by 'the people'. It is all too likely that his first readers heard it as a corporate acknowledgement of guilt by the Jewish nation, and that they connected it, as do other New Testament writers, with the devastation of the nation and its sacred place in the terrible disasters of AD 70, when the Romans destroyed the Temple and along with it the last vestiges of independent power for the people. Read at this level, it can only make the contemporary Christian think of all the centuries in which Jewish guilt formed so significant a part of Christian self-understanding, and of the nightmare which was made possible by this in the twentieth century.

=== Catholic views ===
In the Roman Catechism which was produced by the Council of Trent in the mid-16th century, the Catholic Church taught the belief that the collectivity of sinful humanity was responsible for the death of Jesus, not only the Jews. In the Second Vatican Council (1962–1965), the Catholic Church under Pope Paul VI issued the declaration Nostra aetate, which repudiated the idea of a collective, multigenerational Jewish guilt for the crucifixion of Jesus, condemning antisemitism:

True, the Jewish authorities and those who followed their lead pressed for the death of Christ; still, what happened in His passion cannot be charged against all the Jews, without distinction, then alive, nor against the Jews of today. Although the Church is the new people of God, the Jews should not be presented as rejected or accursed by God, as if this followed from the Holy Scriptures.” Christ “underwent His passion and death freely, because of the sins of men and out of infinite love.

The German Catholic New Testament scholar and theologian Franz Mussner has stated, "No Christian can with a good conscience call upon Matt. 27:25 as a justification of his anti-Judaism. If the blood of Jesus comes upon the children of Israel, it comes upon them as a savior's blood."

Pope Benedict XVI in his 2011 book Jesus of Nazareth: Holy Week wrote:

When in Matthew's account the "whole people" say: "His blood be upon us and on our children" (27:25), the Christian will remember that Jesus' blood speaks a different language from the blood of Abel (Hebrews 12:24): it does not cry out for vengeance and punishment; it brings reconciliation. It is not poured out against anyone; it is poured out for many, for all.

Pilate's need to declare his innocence, "I am innocent of this man's blood", has been interpreted as a reversal of roles: although historically, Jesus was on trial before Pilate, Pilate is also on trial before Jesus.

== Chrysostom ==
St. John Chrysostom delivered a series of eight homilies to his Antioch congregation directed at members who continued to observe Jewish feasts and fasts. Critical of this, he cast Judaism and the synagogues in his city in a critical and negative light. His homilies were expressed in the conventional polemical form.

As quoted by St. Thomas Aquinas in his Catena Aurea (1263), Chrysostom said:

Observe here the infatuation of the Jews; their headlong haste, and destructive passions will not let them see what they ought to see, and they curse themselves, saying, "His blood be upon us", and even entail the curse upon their children. Yet a merciful God did not ratify this sentence, but accepted such of them and of their children as repented; for Paul was of them, and many thousands of those who in Jerusalem believed.

== See also ==
- Antisemitism and the New Testament
- Blood libel, antisemitic trope
- Jewish deicide
- Sanhedrin trial of Jesus
