= 1942 (EP) =

EP by Soul-Junk
- Released: 9 October 2001
- Recorded: 8–10 November 2000; New Jerusalem Recreation Room, Clarksboro, NJ
- Genres: Indie rock, experimental rock, art rock, Christian rock
- Length: 22:44
- Label: Sounds Familyre
- Producer: Daniel Smith

Soul-Junk chronology
1943	1942 (2001)	1941 (2001)

Professional ratings
Review scores
Source	Rating
Pitchfork Media	(7.5/10)
The Phantom Tollbooth	3.5/5 stars

1942 is a 2001 EP release from Soul-Junk.

== Track listing ==
No.	Title	Biblical Reference	Length
1.	"Live Inside the Soul-Junk Cathedral"
2.	"Israel and the Limping Hip"	Genesis 32:22-32
3.	"Soon Seated"	Retells the Sanhedrin Trial of Jesus, Quotes Mark 14:62
4.	"3 Fascinating Smells"	Ezekiel 1
5.	"Weapons!"	2 Corinthians 10:3-5
6.	"Good as Dead"	Revelation 1:17-20, Ezekiel 2:1-2

== Credits ==
- Glen Galaxy – GTR, Singing, Farfisa, Keys, Breaking glass
- Jon Galaxy – Bass, Hand concocted drum machine
- Slo-Ro – Banjo, Clarinet, Trumpet, Loops, Electronics, Toy piano, Acoustic guitar, Backup singing
- Sufjan Stevens – Drums, Melodica, Keys, Handclaps, Bells, Backup singing
- Daniel Smith – Bass on "3 Fascinating Smells," Tambourines, Toy piano, Handclaps, Backup singing
- Micah Ortega – Backup singing
- Chris Palladino – Synth on "Soon Seated"
- Lenny Smith – Backup singing
- Songs by Glen
- Artwork – Glen & Jude
- Mastering – Drew Anderson @ Masterdisk
- Produced by Daniel Smith
