= 1956 (album) =

Studio album by Soul-Junk
- Released: July 13, 2000
- Recorded: Rafter Studio, Rolltop Studio
- Genres: Abstract hip hop, experimental hip hop, Christian hip hop, Lo-fi music, rap rock, glitch hop, Christian rock, drum and bass, experimental rock
- Label: 5 Minute Walk
- Producer: Frank Tate

Soul-Junk chronology
| 1955 (1998) | 1956 (2000) | 1957 (2002) |

Professional ratings
Review scores
| Source | Rating |
|---|---|
| Allmusic | 4/5 stars |
| Jesus Freak Hideout | 3.5/5 stars |
| The Phantom Tollbooth | 4/5 stars |

1956 is an album by hip hop group, Soul-Junk. It was released in July 2000 on 5 Minute Walk. Some tracks were selected to appear on the MTV reality show Road Rules.

== Track listing ==
1. Enter Venus
2. ill-m-i
  - Rachel Galaxy: Vocals
  - Tim Kellett: Violin
3. How We Flow
  - Jason Crane: Trumpet
4. Sarpodyl
  - Brian Cantrell: drums
  - Rachel Galaxy: Vocals
  - Rafter Roberts: Banjo, harmonica, key, tone generators, pump organ, croquet mallets/balls, marimba
  - Tim Coffman: percussion
5. 3po Soul
  - Proverbs – 18:12
  - Rafter Roberts: Vocorder
6. Life to False Metal
  - Nathan Poage: Drums
  - Rafter Roberts: Background Vocals
7. K.I.N.G.D.O.M.O.G.O.D
8. Eyes, Externally
  - Brian Cantrell: Drums
  - Rafter Roberts: Background Vocals
  - dj 3rd Rail: Guest Emcee
9. Monkeyflower & Yarrow
10. Judah
  - Nathan Poage: Drums
11. Pumpfake
12. Lordy Child (Say Abba)
  - Steve Ball: Violin, arrangements
  - Singers:
    - Cathleen, Rachel, Jude, and John Galaxy
    - Christyne, Julia, and Nathan Poage
13. Sea Monsters & Gargoyles
  - Pigeon John: Guest Emcee
14. The Peacemaker
  - Rafter Roberts: Drums
15. Dry Bones
  - Ezekiel – 37:1-28
  - Jason Crane: Trumpet
  - Pall Jenkins: Musical Saw, wind machine
  - Nathan Poage: Drums
  - Evona Waschinski: Upright bass
16. Sweet to my Soul (White Hot Apostle Mix)
  - Nathan Poage: Drums
17. Red Top
  - Pish Posh: Remix

== Credits ==
- Glen Galaxy (MC, guitar, vocals, bass, samples, whistling)
- Jon Galaxy (Bass, samples, kaos pad, keys)
- Tracking: Tim Coffman (Rolltop Studio), Rafter Roberts
- Mixing, Mastering: Rafter Roberts
- Artwork: Aaron James, Amy Matthews

== Covers ==
"ill-m-i" was covered by TobyMac on his albums Welcome to Diverse City and Renovating Diverse City.
