= 1941 (EP) =

EP by Soul-Junk
- Released: 2001
- Recorded: Tim Coffman, Rolltop Studios
- Genres: Indie rock, electronic rock, Progressive rock, Experimental rock
- Label: Absalom Recordings

Soul-Junk chronology
1942 (2001)	1941 (2001)	1940 (2002)

Professional ratings
Review scores
Source	Rating
The Phantom Tollbooth	3/5 stars
Almostcool.org	(5/10)

1941 is a 2001 EP release from Soul-Junk. It was released as part of a 3-inch disc series by Absalom Recordings, and only 1,000 were produced. Its sound is unusual even for Soul-Junk, consisting of purely instrumental electronic music blended with low-fi, jazz, and hip-hop. It is most similar to their album 1956. The song "Rubbernecker" is a remix of the song by the Danielson Famile.

== Track listing ==
1. "Sticker Shawk"
2. "Houston"
3. "Achilles Eye"
4. "Rubbernecker (slo neck rub remix)"
5. "Sulphur Puddle (feat. Chuck P.)"

== Credits ==
- "All songs rhastered by Rafter Roberts"
