= Jesus at Herod's court =

Episode in the New Testament

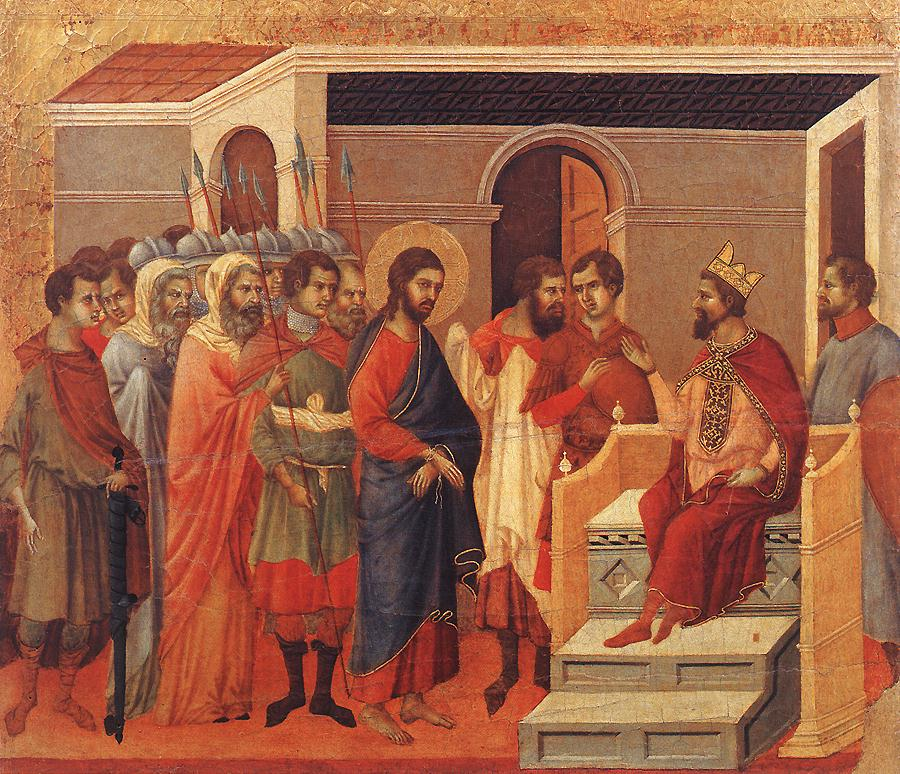
Jesus at Herod's Court, by Duccio, c. 1310

Jesus at Herod's court refers to an episode in the New Testament which describes Jesus being sent to Herod Antipas in Jerusalem, prior to his crucifixion. This episode is described in Luke 23 (23:7–15).

== Biblical narrative ==
In the Gospel of Luke, after the Sanhedrin trial of Jesus, the Court elders ask Pontius Pilate to judge and condemn Jesus in Luke 23:2, accusing Jesus of making false claims of being a king. While questioning Jesus about the claim of being the King of the Jews, Pilate realizes that Jesus is a Galilean and therefore under Herod's jurisdiction. Since Herod already happened to be in Jerusalem at that time, Pilate decides to send Jesus to Herod to be tried.

Herod Antipas (the same man who had previously ordered the death of John the Baptist and, according to some Pharisees, had plotted to have Jesus killed as well, but not to be confused with Herod Antipas's father, Herod the Great who was alleged to have ordered the Massacre of the Innocents) had wanted to see Jesus for a long time, hoping to observe one of the miracles of Jesus. However, Jesus says nothing in response to Herod's questions, or the vehement accusations of the chief priests and the scribes.

Soldiers put a gorgeous robe on Jesus, mocking him as King of the Jews, and send him back to Pilate. That day, Herod and Pilate, who had previously been enemies, become friends.

The Gospel of Luke does not state that Herod did not condemn Jesus, and instead attributes that conclusion to Pilate who then calls together the Court elders, and says to them:

"I having examined him before you, found no fault in this man touching those things whereof ye accuse him: no, nor yet Herod: for he sent him back unto us; and behold, nothing worthy of death hath been done by him."

After further conversations between Pilate and the Court elders, Jesus is sent to be crucified on Calvary.

== Christology ==
This statement by Pilate that Herod found no fault in Jesus is the second of the three declarations he makes about the innocence of Jesus in Luke's Gospel (the first being in 23:4 and the third in 23:22) and builds on the "Christology of innocence" present in that Gospel. In the narrative that follows this episode, other people beside Pilate and Herod also find no fault in Jesus. In 23:41 one of the two thieves crucified next to Jesus also states Jesus's innocence, while in 23:47 the Roman centurion says: "Certainly this was a righteous man." The centurion's characterization illustrates the Christological focus of Luke on innocence (which started in the courts of Pilate and Herod), in contrast to Matthew 27:54 and Mark 15:39 in which the centurion states: "Truly this man was the Son of God", emphasizing Jesus's divinity.

John Calvin considered the lack of response from Jesus to the questions posed by Herod, his silence in the face of the accusations made by the Jewish elders, and the minimal conversation with Pilate after his return from Herod as an element of the "agent Christology" of the crucifixion. Calvin stated that Jesus could have argued for his innocence, but instead remained mostly quiet and willingly submitted to his crucifixion in obedience to the will of the Father, for he knew his role as the "willing Lamb of God". The "agent Christology" reinforced in Herod's court builds on the prediction by Jesus in Luke 18:32 that he shall be: "delivered up unto the Gentiles, and shall be mocked, and shamefully treated." In Herod's court, Luke continues to emphasize Jesus's role not as an "unwilling sacrifice" but as a willing "agent and servant" of God who submitted to the will of the Father.

== See also ==
- Chronology of Jesus
- Pilate's court
- Passion (Christianity)
