= 1952 (album) =

Studio album by Soul-Junk
- Released: Nov 21, 1995
- Genre: Indie rock, Lo-fi music, noise rock, experimental rock
- Label: Homestead Records

Soul-Junk chronology
1951 (1995)	1952 (1995)	1953 (1996)

1952 is the third album release by the band Soul-Junk. It was released in 2 parts, a CD and an LP vinyl record. Most of the lyrics are drawn directly from scripture, specifically the New International Version. The sound on the album is a fusion of rock, punk, and jazz that one critic describes as making "most of today's alternative rock sound like pure pop."

== Track listing ==
=== CD ===
Track Name
Biblical Reference
1. In Your Sanctuary
Psalm 68:19-20, 28, 32–35
2. Spoiler!
Romans 8:3-11
3. Pegasus On The Slow Tip

4. Like The Sunrise
Habakkuk 2:13-14, 20, 3:2-6, 13
- Recorded at: Galaxy Central
5. Sweet To My Soul

6. Doom Beat
Matthew 9:12-13, 2:27-28
7. Kingdom's Fruit, The
Matthew 21:43, 23:37-38
- Recorded at: Galaxy Central
8. Ape The Rich
Luke 12:15-21
9. In Their Sea Thru Raincoats

- Piano: Cindy Wagner
- Recorded at: Wrong Sounds
10. Eyes Of The Spirit

- Recorded at: Galaxy Central
11. Goose-Eggs
Isaiah 1:13,16-18
12. Oahu Strum
Mark 1:2-11
13. Cold-Coct The Corner

- Recorded at: Galaxy Central
14. Episode!
Titus 2:11-14, 3:3-7
15. 7 Horned Star
Zechariah 12:10, 13:1, 9
- Recorded at: Galaxy Central
16. Cup & Dish
Luke 11:29-52
17. Seeing Ear

- Keys: Kevin Branchex'r
18. Another Dome Ride
Zephaniah 3:8-17
- Recorded at: Galaxy Central
19. Hi-Priest
Hebrews 4:15-16
20. Snatched From The Fire
Zechariah 3:1-5
- Recorded at: Galaxy Central
21. Arm In Actiom
Isaiah 30:15, 8–19, 26, 30
22. Throne Speeda Light

23. Nectar Sublet
Galatians 5:6, 6:15, 2:20
24. Men Of Memphis Cracked Your Skull
Malachi 4:1-2, 3:18
- Recorded at: Galaxy Central
25. Sideways Drag
Jeremiah 1:5-10, 17–19
26. Move Like Kings
Romans 5:1-8
27. Soulology

- Recorded at: Galaxy Central
28. Slo-Jam In The Endzone

- Keys: Kevin Branchex'r
29. Junk On Lax
1 Peter 3:15-20, 4:1-2
30. Kingdom Of Heaven
1 Corinthians 4:20, 2 Corinthians 13:3-4
31. Zion!
Isaiah 52:1-2, 6–12
- Bass: Jon Galaxy
- Recorded by: Scott Exum (DML Studios)

=== Vinyl LP ===
1. Yard Sax Leader
2. All The Prophets
3. Friend Lend Me Some Bread
4. Strongman
5. Electronix From A Puddle
6. Salve For Your Eyes
7. The Merchandise!
8. Whatever Is
9. Apocalypso
10. Drink The Jacuzzi
11. Yeah Fist City
12. Snail Trax
13. See No More Visions
14. Even Now
15. Kick In The Sink
16. Nicodemus Song

== Credits ==
- Glen Galaxy – Guitar, Singing, Drums, Sax, Keys, Bass, Blown smoke harp, Banjo
- Jon Galaxy – Bass
- Brian Cantrell – Drums, Percussion, Trombone, Moog
- Ron Easterbrooks – Guitar, Singing, Trumpet, Moog, Trombone, Bass, Drums
- All songs without recording credits were recorded by Bill Day at Daydream Studios
