= Sanhedrin trial of Jesus =

Trial of Jesus before the Sanhedrin, a Jewish judicial body

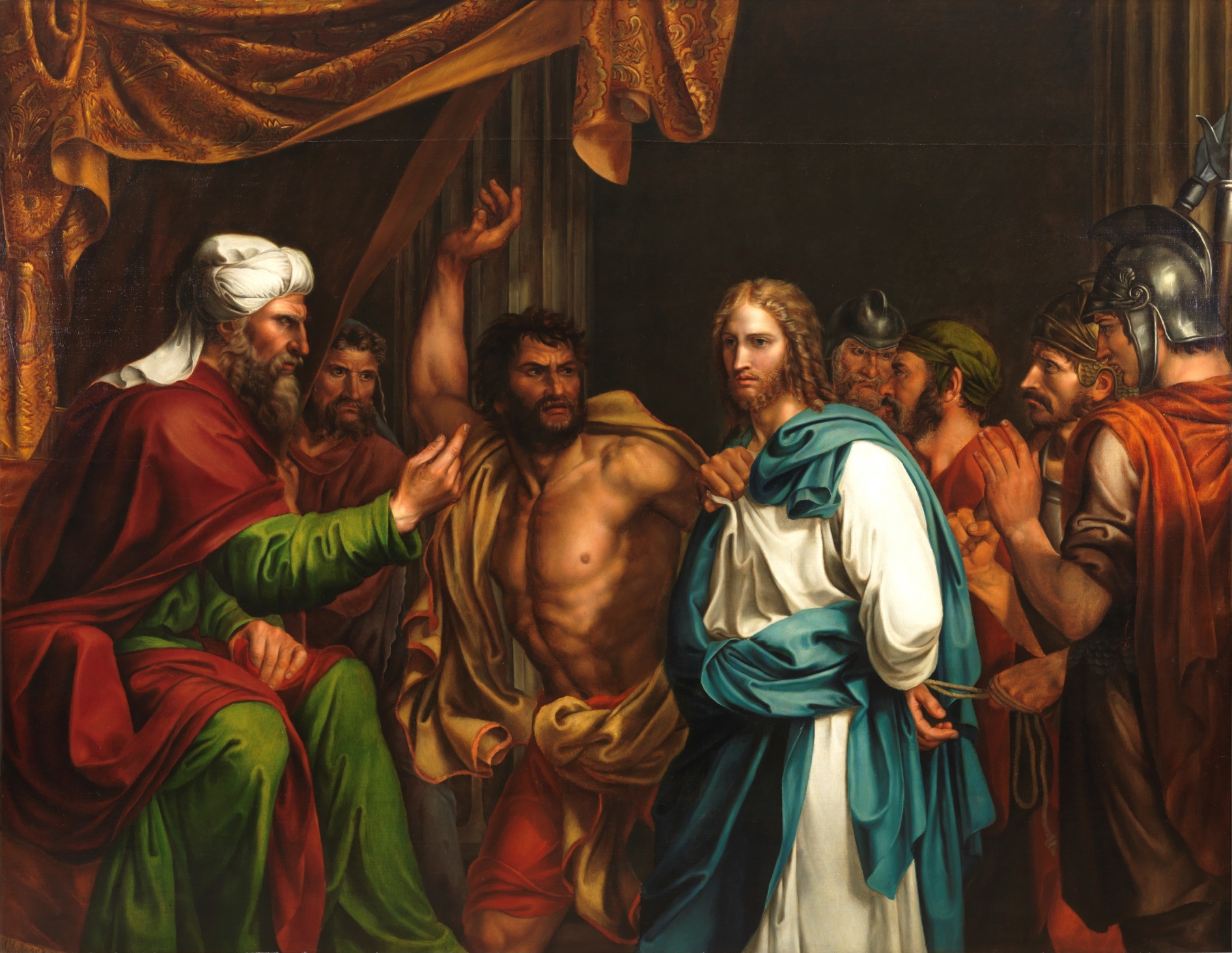
- Jesus about to be struck in front of former High Priest Annas, as in John 18:22 (Madrazo, 1803)
- Court: Sanhedrin
- Decided: AD 30 or 33
- Verdict: Guilty

Case history
- Subsequent actions: Following trials at Pilate's and Herod's courts, sentenced to death

In the New Testament, the Sanhedrin trial of Jesus refers to the trial of Jesus before the Sanhedrin (a Jewish judicial body) following his arrest in Jerusalem and prior to the trial before Pontius Pilate. It is an incident reported by all three synoptic Gospels of the New Testament, while the Gospel of John refers to a preliminary inquiry before Annas. The gospel accounts vary on a number of details.

Jesus is generally quiet, does not defend himself, rarely responds to the accusations, and is found guilty of: violating the Sabbath law (by healing on the Sabbath); threatening to destroy the Jewish Temple; practicing sorcery, exorcising people by the power of demons; blasphemy; and claiming to be the Messiah. He is then taken to Pontius Pilate, the governor of Roman Judaea, to be tried for claiming to be the King of the Jews.

== Evening inquest at Caiaphas's palace ==
In the narrative of the synoptic gospels, after the arrest of Jesus, he is taken to the private residence of Caiaphas, the high priest. Matthew 26 (Matthew 26:57) states that Jesus was taken to the house of Caiaphas the High Priest of Israel, where the scribes and the elders were gathered together. Mark 14 (Mark 14:53) states that Jesus was taken that night "to the high priest" (without naming the priest), where all the chief priests and the elders gathered.

According to John's gospel, Jesus was taken not to Caiaphas but to Annas, who questioned him only privately. A former high priest and father-in-law of Caiaphas, Annas remained very influential. The fact that Jesus was taken not to Caiaphas but to Annas is explained on the ground that the latter's palace was nearer the place of arrest than that of the former. Peter and other disciples, however, being ignorant of the state of affairs, went to Caiaphas's house in the night.

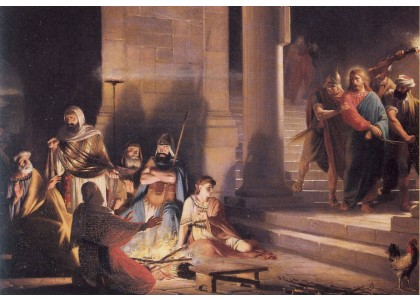
La negazione di Pietro, Arturo Viligiardi, 1888

In all four Gospel accounts, the trial of Jesus before the priests and scribes is interleaved with the Denial of Peter narrative, where Apostle Peter, who has followed Jesus, denies knowing him three times. The intercalated narrative of Jesus' resolute determination offers contrast to the framing narrative of Peter's aggrieved denials (Mark 14:53–54, 14:66–72). Luke 22 (Luke 22:61) states that as Jesus was bound and standing at the priest's house Peter was in the courtyard. Jesus "turned and looked straight at him", and Peter remembered the words Jesus had spoken to him: "Before the rooster crows today, you will disown me three times."

In John 18 (John 18:24), Jesus is sent from Annas to Caiaphas the high priest. Both Matthew and Mark say that another consultation was held among the priests the next morning. The second interview with Jesus was "evidently held in the house of Caiaphas, rather than in the Chamber of Hewn Stone".

According to Luke 22:63, at Caiaphas's house, Jesus is mocked and beaten. He is accused of claiming to be both the Messiah and the Son of God. Although the Gospel accounts vary with respect to some of the details, they agree on the general character and overall structure of the trials of Jesus.

Mark 14:55–59 states that the chief priests sought witnesses to testify against Jesus but did not find any. Matthew characterizes these as false witnesses. Many gave false witness against him, but their testimony did not agree. Finally two came forward and accused him of saying "I am able to destroy the temple and raise it again in three days". Theologian Eckhard J. Schnabel points out that if the Sanhedrin had wished to contrive false testimony they would have prepared the witnesses so that their statements would have confirmed rather than contradicted each other.

In the Gospel accounts, Jesus speaks very little and gives very infrequent and indirect answers to the priests' questions, according to John 18:22, prompting an officer to slap him. In Matthew 26:62, the lack of response from Jesus prompts the high priest to ask him, "Answerest thou nothing?" In the Gospel accounts, the men holding Jesus at the high priest's house mock, blindfold, insult and beat him, sometimes slapping him and asking him to guess who had hit him.

Mark 14:61 states that the high priest then asked Jesus, "Art thou the Christ, the Son of the Blessed?" And Jesus said, "I am", at which point the high priest tore his own robe in anger and accused Jesus of blasphemy. In Matthew 26:63, the high priest said, "Tell us whether you are the Christ, the Son of God." Jesus responded, "You have said it", and added, "But I say to all of you: In the future you will see the Son of Man sitting at the right hand of the Mighty One and coming on the clouds of heaven", prompting the High Priest to tear his own robe, breaking Mosaic Law (Leviticus 21:10), and to accuse him of blasphemy.

According to Luke, Joseph of Arimathea was a counsellor, a member of the Sanhedrin who dissented from the decision. According to John, Nicodemus was with Joseph of Arimathea to recover and bury Jesus' body, leading to the inference that he also dissented.

== Morning arraignment and trial ==
Luke 22:66 states that, "as soon as it was day", the chief priests and scribes gathered together and led Jesus away into their council. John 18:28 states that, early in the morning, Jesus was led from Caiaphas to Pontius Pilate in the Praetorium.

In Luke 22:67, Jesus is asked: "If thou art the Christ, tell us. But he said unto them, If I tell you, ye will not believe". But, in 22:70, when asked "Are you then the Son of God?", Jesus answers "You say that I am", affirming the title Son of God, used throughout the rest of the New Testament of the Christian Bible to refer to his role as the Messiah, or Christ, the King chosen by God. At that point, the priests say "What further need have we of witness? for we ourselves have heard from his own mouth", and they decide to condemn Jesus. Two of the four gospels (Matthew and Mark) state that the great majority of the Sanhedrin or the entire Sanhedrin condemned Jesus as worthy of death because of blasphemy.

Thereafter, in Pilate's Court, the Jewish elders ask Pontius Pilate to judge and condemn Jesus, accusing him of claiming to be the King of the Jews. Such a claim would be considered treasonous for being a direct challenge to the Roman authorities.

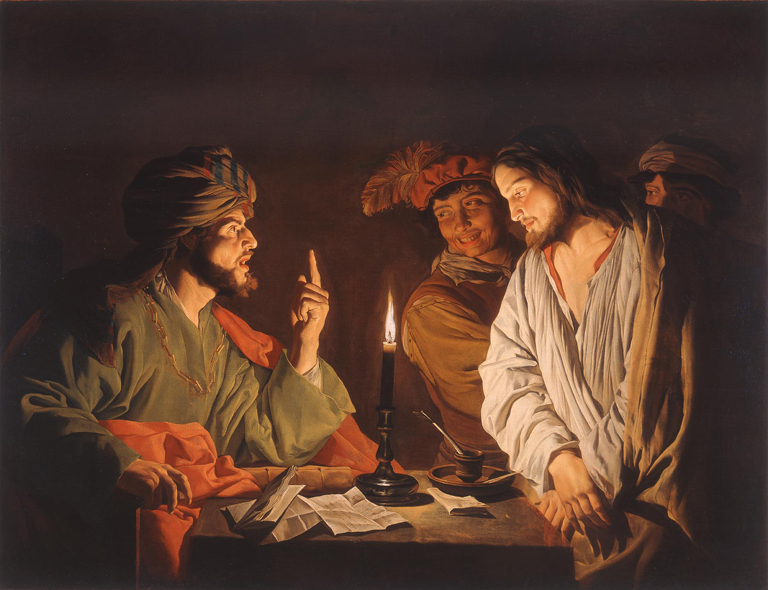
Matthias Stom's depiction of Jesus before Caiaphas, c. 1630

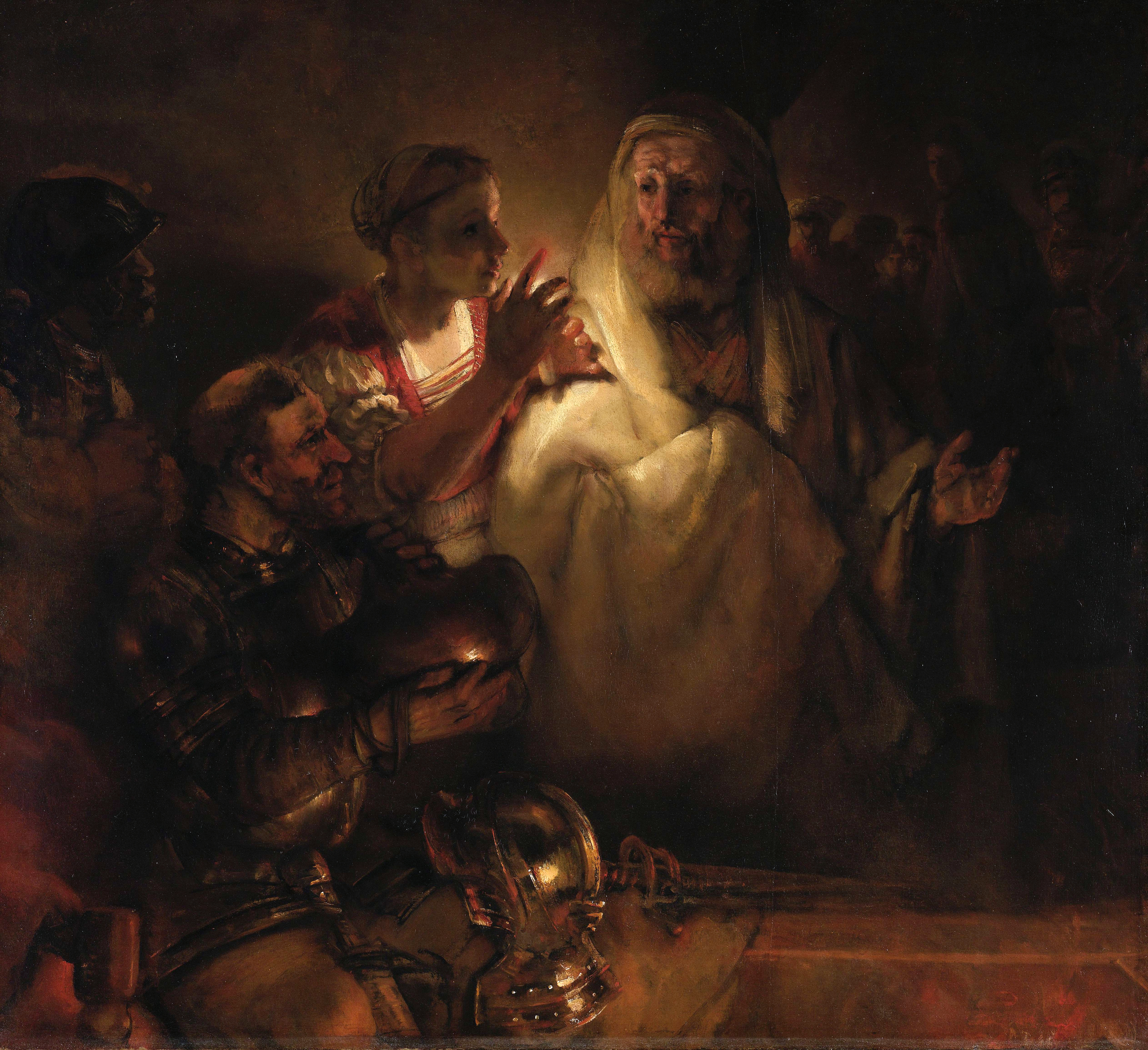
Rembrandt's 1660 depiction of Peter's Denial. Jesus, in the upper right hand corner, is at the high priest's house, his hands bound behind him, and turns to look at Peter.

== Commentary ==
The historicity of the gospel narratives has been questioned by scholars, who suggest that the evangelists' accounts reflect the later antagonism that arose between the Church and the Synagogue. They show a tendency to minimize the actions of Pilate and emphasize the responsibilities of the Jews. Pilate's effectiveness as governor depended on cooperation with the aristocratic Jewish leadership. Provincial governors "had full jurisdiction over capital cases, even when they worked in conjunction with local courts".

== Comparison ==
=== Narrative comparison ===
The following comparison table is primarily based on the New International Version (NIV) English translation of the New Testament.

	Matthew	Mark	Luke	John
Sanhedrin trial before Caiaphas (Matthew, Mark, Luke) or Annas (John)	Matthew 26:57–67: Jesus taken to Caiaphas' court.; Sanhedrin brought forth false witnesses.; Jesus remained silent. Caiaphas: 'Are you the Messiah, the Son of God?'; Jesus: 'You say so, but from now on you will see the Son of Man next to the Mighty One and coming on the clouds of heaven.'; Caiaphas tore his clothes and said: 'Blasphemy! Who needs more witnesses, now you have heard the blasphemy! What do you think?'; The rest answered: 'He is worthy of death!'; Jesus spat on and beaten. 'Prophesy, who hit you, Messiah?'; Denial of Peter.	Mark 14:53–65: Jesus taken to the high priest.; Sanhedrin brought forth false witnesses.; Jesus remained silent. High priest: 'Are you the Messiah, the Son of the Blessed One?'; Jesus: 'I am, and you will see the Son of Man next to the Mighty One and coming on the clouds of heaven.'; High priest tore his clothes: 'Who needs more witnesses, now you have heard the blasphemy! What do you think?'; They all condemned him as worthy of death.; Jesus spat on, blindfolded and beaten. 'Prophesy!'; Denial of Peter.	Luke 22:54–71: Jesus taken to high priest's house.; Denial of Peter.; Jesus mocked and beaten. Blindfolded and asked: 'Prophesy! Who hit you?'; At daybreak, Sanhedrin asked Jesus if he is the Messiah.; Jesus: 'You won't believe me, but from now on the Son of Man will be next to the power of God.'; All: 'Are you then the Son of God?'; Jesus: 'You say that I am.'; All: 'Who needs more testimony? We've heard him say it himself!'	John 18:13–28: Jesus taken to Annas' court.; Denial of Peter (part 1).; Annas questioned Jesus about his disciples and teaching.; Jesus told Annas about his ministry.; Officer of Annas slapped Jesus, who asked him why.; Annas sent Jesus, bound, to Caiaphas.; Denial of Peter (part 2).; Jesus taken from Caiaphas to Pilate.
Trial before Pilate (Luke: and also before Herod Antipas)	Matthew 27:1–14: Early in the morning the chief priests and elders planned to have Jesus executed.; Judas regretted, threw back the thirty pieces of silver into the Temple and hanged himself.; Pilate: 'Are you the king of the Jews?' Jesus: 'You have said so.'; Jesus otherwise remained silent, which amazed Pilate.	Mark 15:1–5: Very early in the morning the chief priests, elders, law teachers and Sanhedrin made plans, bound Jesus and took him to Pilate.; Pilate: 'Are you the king of the Jews?' Jesus: 'You have said so.'; Jesus otherwise remained silent, which amazed Pilate.	Luke 23:1–12: The whole assembly rose and took Jesus to Pilate.; They accused Jesus of subverting the nation, opposing Roman taxes, and claiming to be Messiah, a king.; Pilate: 'Are you the king of the Jews?' Jesus: 'You have said so.'; Pilate: 'I find no guilt in this man.'; They: 'He came from Galilee stirring up people all over Judea by his teaching!'; Pilate sent Jesus to Herod Antipas because he was a Galilean.; Herod – also in Jerusalem at the time – was pleased to see Jesus, but Jesus didn't answer his questions. The chief priests and law teachers accused Jesus. Herod and his soldiers then mocked Jesus, put an elegant robe on him and sent him back to Pilate.	John 18:28–38: Early in the morning Jesus was taken to Pilate by the Jewish leaders, who refused to enter the praetorium to stay ceremonially clean for Passover.; Pilate came out and asked them why. They said only Pilate could apply the death penalty.; Pilate, inside: 'Are you the king of the Jews?' Jesus: 'My kingdom is not of this world, otherwise my servants would have fought to prevent my arrest by the Jewish leaders.'; Pilate: 'You are a king, then!' Jesus: 'You say that I am a king. In fact, the reason I was born and came into the world is to testify to the truth. Everyone on the side of truth listens to me.' Pilate: 'What is truth?'; Pilate, outside: 'I find no guilt in him.'
Jesus versus Barabbas	Matthew 27:15–26: Narrator explains the amnesty vote and Barabbas.; Pilate asked crowd: 'Should I release Barabbas or Jesus 'the Messiah'?'; Pilate's wife begged him to release Jesus. Chief priests and elders persuaded the crowd against Jesus.; Pilate asked crowd: 'Who should I release?' Crowd: 'Barabbas!'; Pilate: 'What should I do with Jesus?' Crowd: 'Crucify him!'; Pilate: 'What crime has he committed then?' Crowd, louder: 'Crucify him!'; Pilate washed his hands of guilt and said: 'I'm innocent of this man's blood, it's your responsibility!' Crowd: 'His blood is on us and on our children!'; Pilate released Barabbas, had Jesus flogged and abducted.	Mark 15:6–15: Narrator explains the amnesty vote and Barabbas.; Pilate asked crowd: 'Do you want me to release the king of the Jews?'; Chief priests stirred up the crowd to release Barabbas.; Pilate: 'What shall I do, then, with the one you call the king of the Jews?' Crowd: 'Crucify him!'; Pilate: 'What crime has he committed then?' Crowd, louder: 'Crucify him!'; Pilate released Barabbas, had Jesus flogged and abducted.	Luke 23:13–25: Pilate tells chief priests and rulers: 'I've found Jesus not guilty, neither has Herod. So I will flog him and release him.'; But the crowd shouted: 'Away with him! Release Barabbas!'; Narrator explains Barabbas.; Pilate tried to appeal for Jesus's release and repeated his not guilty verdict, but due to insistent loud shouting for crucifixion, Pilate gave in to their demand.; Pilate released Barabbas, had Jesus abducted.	John 18:39–19:16: Pilate explained the amnesty vote and asked: 'Do you want me to release 'the king of the Jews'?'; They shouted back: 'No, not him! Give us Barabbas!' Narrator explains Barrabas.; Pilate had Jesus flogged.; Soldiers put a purple robe and a crown of thorns on Jesus.; Soldiers called out to Jesus: 'Hail, king of the Jews!'; They struck him with their hands.; Pilate, outside, repeated his not guilty verdict and presented Jesus: 'Here is the man!'; Chief priests and officials shouted: 'Crucify! Crucify!' Pilate: 'Go ahead and crucify him. I myself find no guilt in him.' Jewish leaders: 'Our law says he must die because he claimed to be the Son of God.'; Pilate, afraid, interrogated Jesus inside. Jesus: 'You would have no power over me if it were not given to you from above. Therefore the one who handed me over to you is guilty of a greater sin.' Pilate tried to set Jesus free.; Jewish leaders: 'If you let him go, you disobey Caesar. Anyone who claims to be a king opposes Caesar.'; Pilate brought out Jesus around noon, saying: 'Here is your king.' They shouted: 'Take him away, crucify him!'; Pilate: 'Shall I crucify your king?' Chief priests: 'We have no king but Caesar.'; Pilate had Jesus abducted.
Jesus abducted for crucifixion	Matthew 27:27–31: Roman soldiers took Jesus into the praetorium.; Soldiers undressed Jesus and put a scarlet robe, a crown of thorns and a staff on him.; Soldiers knelt in front of Jesus and mocked him saying: 'Hail, king of the Jews!'; They spit on him, took the staff and struck his head.; They took off the robe, put his clothes back on and led him away.	Mark 15:16–20: Roman soldiers took Jesus into the praetorium.; Soldiers put a purple robe and a crown of thorns on Jesus.; Soldiers called out to Jesus: 'Hail, king of the Jews!'; They struck his head with a staff, spit on him and knelt in homage to him.; After mocking, they took off the purple robe, put his clothes back on, led him outside and away.	Luke 23:26–36: Jesus led away by both chief priests and Roman soldiers.; [No mistreatment by soldiers]	John 19:17–23: Jesus led away by both chief priests and Roman soldiers.; [No further mistreatment by soldiers]

=== Chronological comparison ===
Approximate chronological comparison between the Jesus Passion narratives according to the Gospels of Mark and John. Each section ('1' to '28') represents three hours of time.

== See also ==
- Chronology of Jesus
- Jesus at Herod's court
- Denial of Peter
- Kiss of Judas
- Life of Jesus in the New Testament
- Passion of Jesus
- Pilate's court
- Thirty Pieces of silver
