= Onofrio =

Onofrio is an Italian male given name and surname, derived from the saint Onuphrius. Notable people with the name include:

== As a given name ==
- Onofrio Avellino (1674–1741), Italian painter
- Onofrio Barone (born 1964), Italian football coach and former player
- Onofrio Catacchio (born 1964), Italian comics artist
- Onofrio Fusco (1918–1994), Italian football player and manager
- Onofrio Gabrielli (1619–1706), Italian painter
- Onofrio del Grillo (1714-1787), Italian papal nobleman
- Onofrio Antonio Gisolfi (died 1656), Italian engineer and architect
- Onofrio Montesoro (1647–1722), Italian Roman Catholic prelate
- Onofrio Palumbo (1606–1650s), Italian painter
- Onofrio Panvinio (1529–1568), Italian Augustinian friar, historian and antiquary
- Onofrio de Ponte (died 1676), Italian Roman Catholic prelate
- Onofrio Puglisi (died 1679), Italian mathematician
- Onofrio di Santa Croce (died 1471), Italian Roman Catholic cardinal
- Onofrio Sciortino (died 1959), Italian-American mobster
- Francesco Onofrio Manfredini (1684–1762), Italian composer, violinist and church musician
- Francesco Onofrio Odierna (1644–1736), Italian Roman Catholic prelate
- Lorenzo Onofrio Colonna, multiple people

== As a surname ==
- Al Onofrio (1921–2004), American football player and coach
- Judy Onofrio (born 1939), American artist
- Marco Onofrio (born 1971), Italian writer, essayist and literary critic
- Anna-Joséphine Dufour-Onofrio (1817–1901), French-Swiss businesswoman

== See also ==
- D'Onofrio
- Onofri
- Sant'Onofrio (disambiguation)
