= June 12 (Eastern Orthodox liturgics) =

Day in the Eastern Orthodox liturgical calendar

Eastern Orthodox liturgical calendar
June 11	June 12	June 13
June 12 O.S. ≍ June 25 N.S. June 12 N.S ≍ May 30 O.S.

An Eastern Orthodox cross

June 12 in Eastern Orthodox liturgical calendars is a feast day and a day of commemoration of saints and martyrs. Although some Orthodox churches use the Revised Julian Calendar and others use the traditional Julian calendar, the fixed commemorations for their respective June 12 are broadly the same, no matter which calendar is used. (Note: Despite the dates being the same, the days to which they refer typically differ by 13 days. The notation Old Style or O.S. is sometimes used to indicate a date in the traditional Julian Calendar (the "Old Calendar"). The notation New Style or N.S. indicates a date in the Revised Julian calendar (the "New Calendar").)

== Saints ==
- Virgin-martyr Antonina, of Nicaea in Bithynia (c. 286-305) (Note: "At Nicæa, in Bithynia, St. Antonina, martyr, who was scourged by order of the governor Priscillian during the same persecution, then racked, lacerated, exposed to the fire, and finally put to the sword.") (see also: March 1)
- Saints Basilides, Cyrinus, Nabor and Nazarius, and those with them, soldiers, at Rome (304) (Note: "At Rome, on the Aurelian road, during the persecution of Decius and under the prefect Aurelius, the birthday of the holy martyrs Basilides, Cyrinus, Nabor, and Nazarius, soldiers, who were cast into prison for the confession of the Christian name, scourged with scorpions, and finally decapitated.")
- Saint Amphianus (Amphion, Alerion, Amphitrion), Bishop and Confessor, in Cilicia (c. 310) (Note: "In Cilicia, the bishop St. Amphion, a celebrated confessor of the time of Galerius Maximian.")
- Saint Triphyllius, Bishop of Leucosia (Nicosia), in Cyprus (370)
- Saint Zenon, Bishop of Kyrenia in Cyprus. (Note: Name days celebrated today include: Zenon, Zeno (Ζήνωνας).)
- Saint Olympius, Bishop and Confessor, in Thrace (4th century) (Note: "In Thrace, St. Olympius, a bishop, who was expelled from his see by the Arians, and died a confessor.")
- Saint Timothy the Hermit, of Egypt (4th century)
- Saints John, Andrew, Heraclemon, and Theophilus, hermits of Egypt (4th century) (see also: December 2)
- Venerable Onuphrius the Great (4th century) (Note: There is a monastery in Jerusalem dedicated to him. The monastery is located at the far end of Gai Ben Hinnom, the Gehenna valley of hell, further it is situated within the site of a Jewish Second Temple cemetery and is built among and includes many typical burial niches common to that period. The monastery also marks the location of Hakeldama, the purported place where Judas Iscariot hanged himself.) (Note: "In Egypt, St. Onuphrius, an anchoret, who for sixty years led a religious life in the desert, and renowned for great virtues and merits, departed for heaven. His admirable deeds were recorded by the abbot Paphnutius.") (Note: Name days celebrated today include: Onuphrios (Ὀνούφριος).)
- Saint John the Soldier, of Egypt (6th-7th century)
- Venerable Peter of Mount Athos (734)
- Venerable Julian of Dagaz (Dogazou), of the Dagouta Church in Constantinople.
- Saint John (Tornicus) of Mt. Athos and Georgia (998)

== Pre-Schism Western saints ==
- Virgin-martyr Cunera of Rhenen, Netherlands (451)
- Saint Ternan, an early missionary bishop among the Picts in Scotland (5th century) (Note: He is said to have lived in Abernethy and been consecrated by St Palladius. He founded the monastery of Culross in Fifeshire.)
- Saint Leo III, Pope of Rome, who refused to add the filioque to the Nicene Creed (816) (Note: Born in Rome, he became Pope of Rome in 795. He suffered much from political factions in Rome and was himself seized and tortured. Leo refused to add the filioque to the Nicene Creed.) (Note: "At Rome, in the Vatican basilica, the pope St. Leo III, to whom God miraculously restored his eyes and his tongue after they had been torn out by impious men.")
- Saint Odulphus (Odulph), Confessor and Priest (c. 855) (Note: Born in Brabant in Belgium, he went to Utrecht in Holland and helped enlighten Frisia, founding a monastery.)
- Saint Gerebald, Bishop of Châlons-sur-Seine in France (885)

== Post-Schism Orthodox saints ==
- New Martyr John of Trebizond, who contested in Akkerman (Asprokastron, Bilhorod-Dnistrovskyi) (1330 or 1492)
- Venerable Arsenius of Konevits, founder of Konevits Monastery, Wonderworker (1447) (Note: See: (in Russian) Арсений Коневский. Википе́дия. (Russian Wikipedia).)
- Venerable Onuphrius of Malsk, founder of Malsk Monastery in Pskov, Wonderworker (1492) (Note: See: (in Russian) Онуфрий Мальский. Википе́дия. (Russian Wikipedia).)
- Saints Onuphrius and Auxentius, monks, of Vologda (15th-16th century)
- Venerable Stephen of Komel, founder of Ozersk Monastery in Vologda (1542)
- Saints Jonah and Bassian, monks of Pertomsk in Solovki (1561) (Note: See: (in Russian) Иона и Вассиан. Википе́дия. (Russian Wikipedia).)
- Saint Onuphrius of Katrom Monastery, founder of Katrom Monastery in Vologda (16th century)
- Venerable Serapion the Wonderworker, of Izborsk, Igumen (16th century)
- Saint Onuphrius the Fool-for-Christ, of Romanov-Borisoglebsk. (Note: His name is referenced in the hagiology of Yevgeny Golubinsky.)
- Venerable Onuphrios of Preveza, of the Monastery of the Birth of the Theotokos, in Coronisia in Arta, Greece (18th century)
- Hieromartyr Benedict of Serres and Thessaloniki, priest, by beheading, and other monk-martyrs with him (1821):

- Monk-martyr Paul of Ioannina and Thessaloniki (c. 1821)
- Monk-martyr Synesios of Thessaloniki (1821)
- Monk-martyr Timotheos of Veria and Thessaloniki (1822)

=== New martyrs and confessors ===
- New Martyrs Onuphrius, Bishop (1938), and those with him:

- Anthony, Barsanuphius and Joseph (1937), and Bishop Alexander Kharkovsky.

== Other commemorations ==
- Synaxis of Venerable Alypius the Stylite of Adrianopolis, in Constantinople. (Note: His feast day is on November 26. A monastery was dedicated to him near the Hippodrome of Constantinople.)
- First (1650) and second (1909) glorifications of St. Anna of Kashin (1368), princess of Kashin (Euphrosyne in monasticism). (see also: October 2, July 21)
- Uncovering of the relics (1672) of St. John of Moscow, Fool-for-Christ (1589)
- Synaxis of the Saints of the St. Onuphrius Monastery at Jabłeczna in Poland.
- Miracle-working icons of the Theotokos and St. Onuphrius, at St. Onuphrius Monastery in Poland (14th century)
- Repose of Elder Peter of Katounakia, Mt. Athos (1867)
- Repose of Blessed Hermit Philaretus of Mt. Athos (1961)

== Icon gallery ==
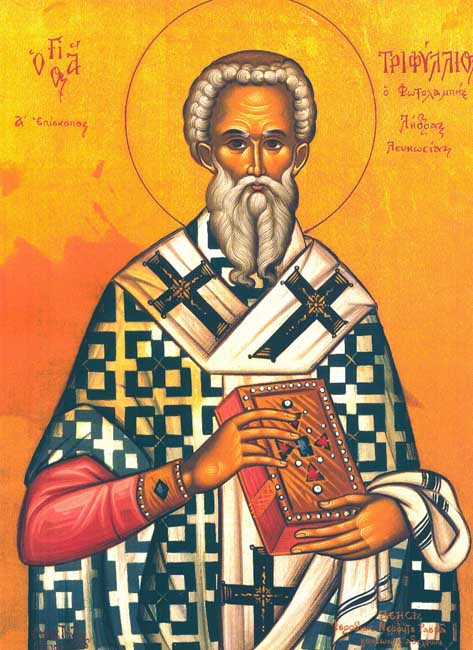
Saint Triphyllius, Bishop of Leucosia.

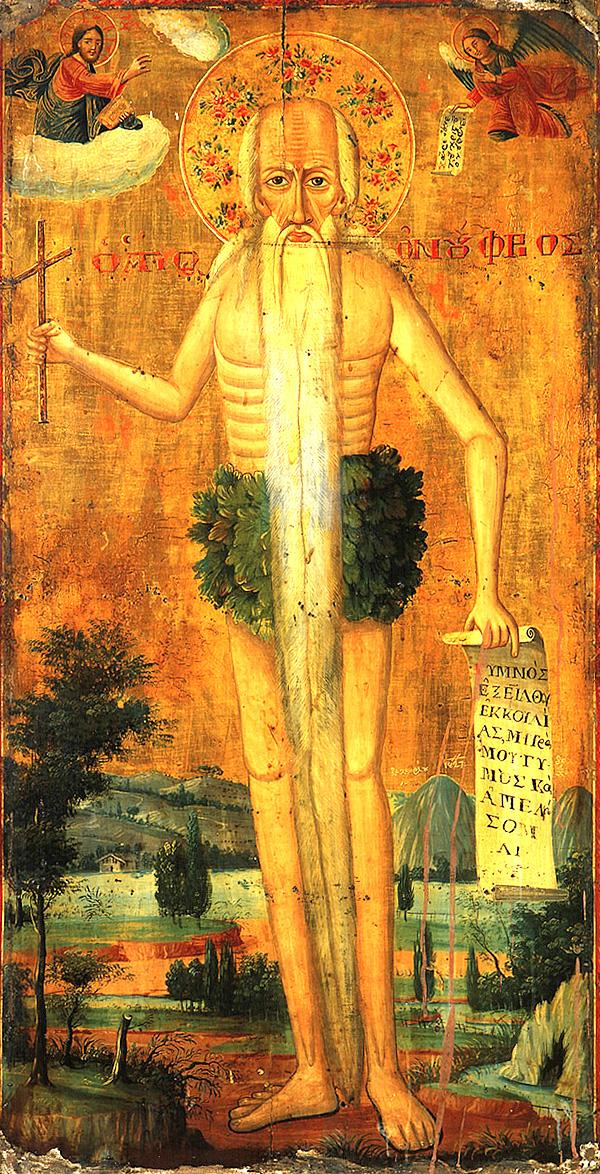
Venerable Onuphrius the Great.

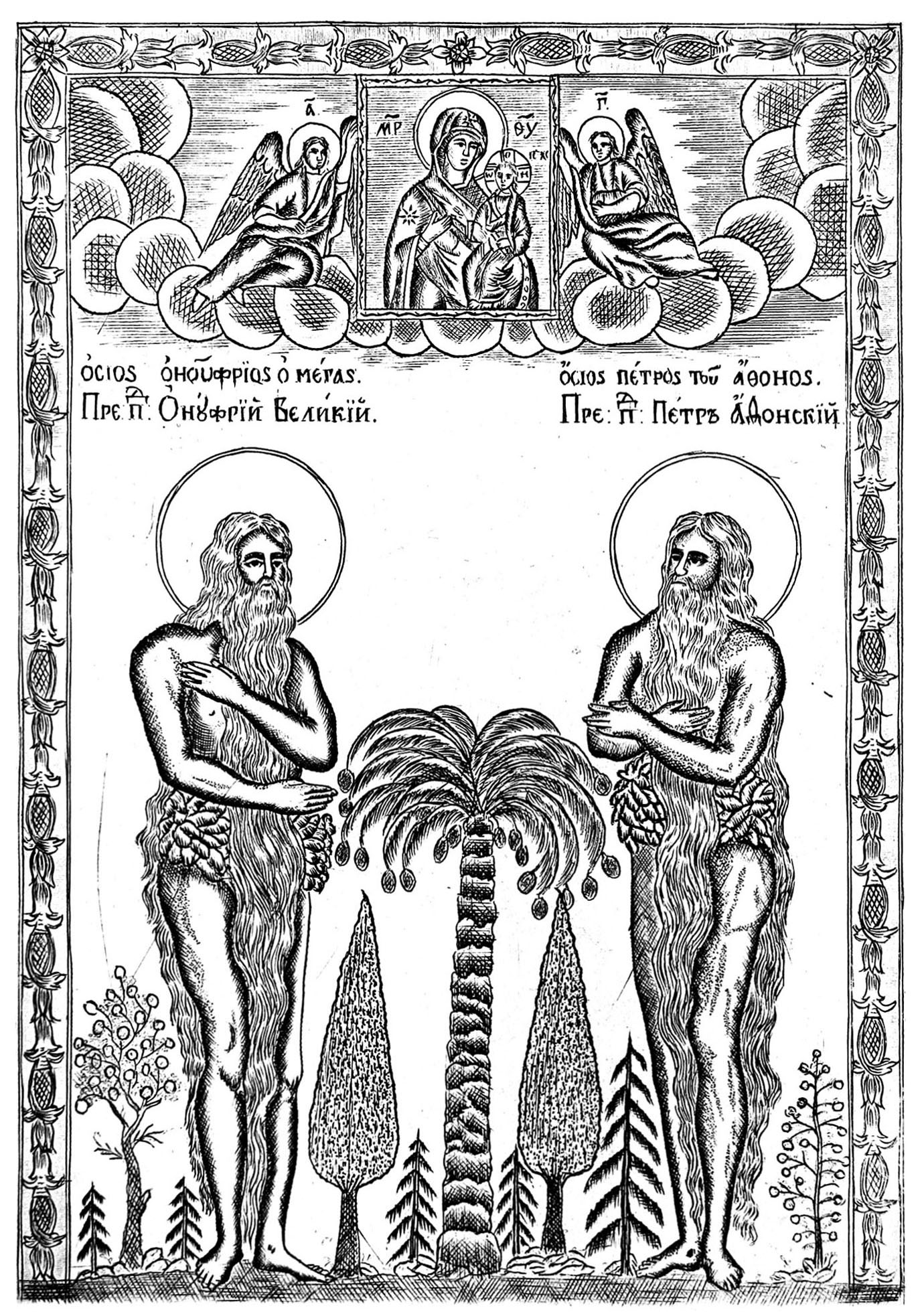
Venerables Onuphrius the Great and Peter of Mount Athos.

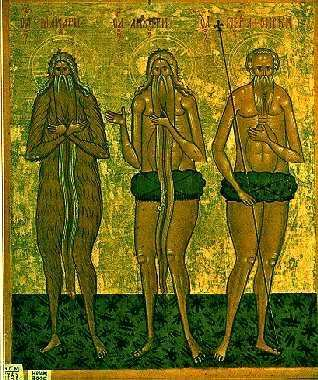
Venerables Onuphrius the Great, Macarius of Egypt, and Peter of Mount Athos.

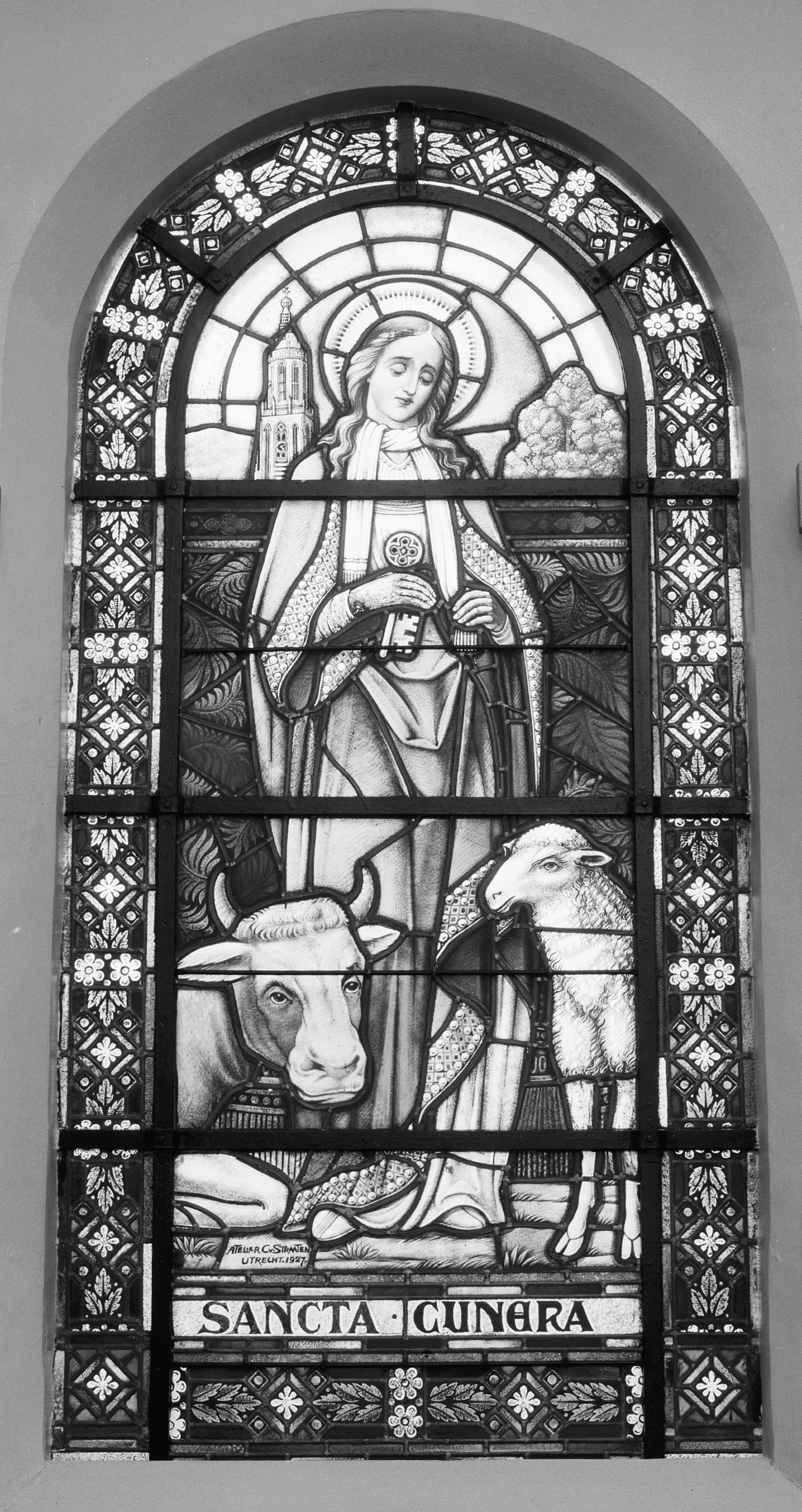
Virgin-martyr Cunera of Rhenen.

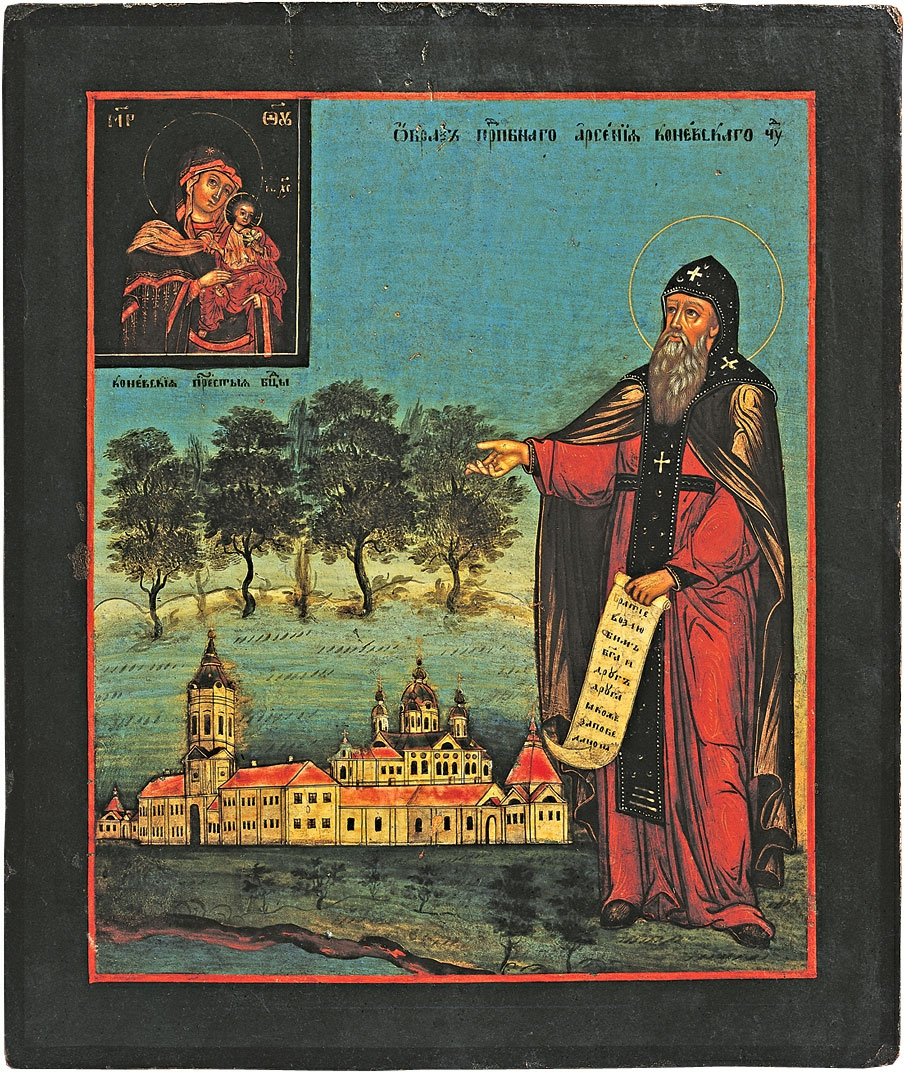
Venerable Arsenius of Konevits.

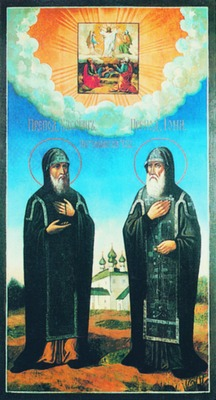
Sts. Jonah and Bassian, monks of Pertomsk in Solovki.

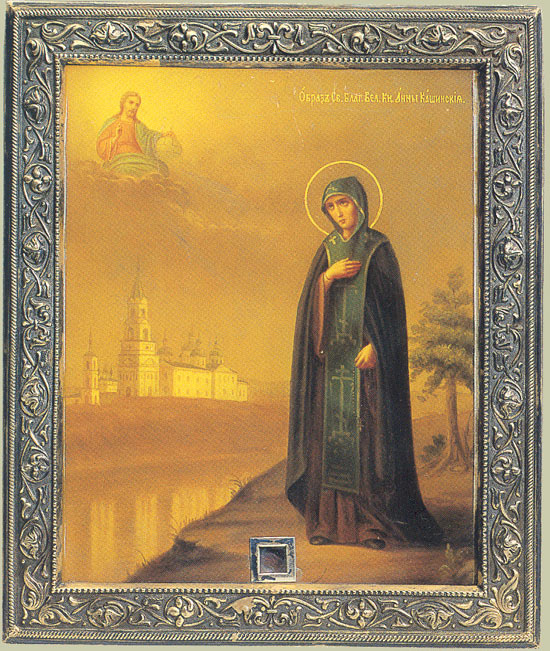
St. Anna of Kashin.

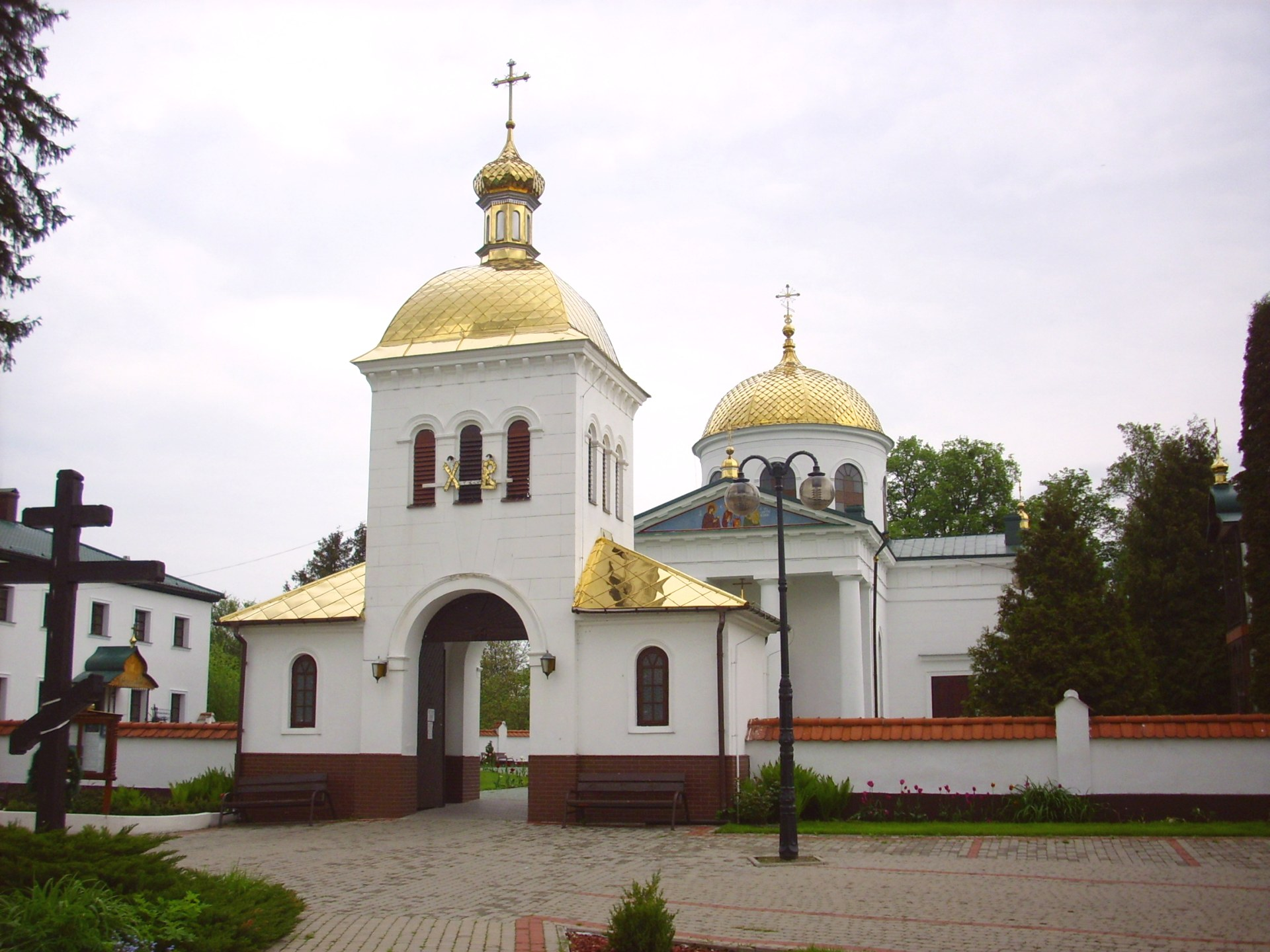
St. Onuphrius Monastery at Jabłeczna in Poland.

== Sources ==
- June 12/25. Orthodox Calendar (PRAVOSLAVIE.RU).
- June 25 / June 12. HOLY TRINITY RUSSIAN ORTHODOX CHURCH (A parish of the Patriarchate of Moscow).
- June 12. OCA - The Lives of the Saints.
- The Autonomous Orthodox Metropolia of Western Europe and the Americas (ROCOR). St. Hilarion Calendar of Saints for the year of our Lord 2004. St. Hilarion Press (Austin, TX). p. 43.
- The Twelfth Day of the Month of June. Orthodoxy in China.
- June 12. Latin Saints of the Orthodox Patriarchate of Rome.
- The Roman Martyrology. Transl. by the Archbishop of Baltimore. Last Edition, According to the Copy Printed at Rome in 1914. Revised Edition, with the Imprimatur of His Eminence Cardinal Gibbons. Baltimore: John Murphy Company, 1916. p. 171.
- Rev. Richard Stanton. A Menology of England and Wales, or, Brief Memorials of the Ancient British and English Saints Arranged According to the Calendar, Together with the Martyrs of the 16th and 17th Centuries. London: Burns & Oates, 1892. pp. 265–267.

Greek Sources

- Great Synaxaristes: (in Greek) 12 ΙΟΥΝΙΟΥ. ΜΕΓΑΣ ΣΥΝΑΞΑΡΙΣΤΗΣ.
- (in Greek) Συναξαριστής. 12 Ιουνίου. ECCLESIA.GR. (H ΕΚΚΛΗΣΙΑ ΤΗΣ ΕΛΛΑΔΟΣ).
- (in Greek) 12/06/2017. Ορθόδοξος Συναξαριστής.

Russian Sources

- (in Russian) 25 июня (12 июня). Православная Энциклопедия под редакцией Патриарха Московского и всея Руси Кирилла (электронная версия). (Orthodox Encyclopedia - Pravenc.ru).
- (in Russian) 12 июня по старому стилю / 25 июня по новому стилю. Русская Православная Церковь - Православный церковный календарь на 2017 год.
- (in Russian) 12 июня (ст.ст.) 25 июня 2014 (нов. ст.). Русская Православная Церковь Отдел внешних церковных связей. (DECR).
