= Santa Maria della Pietà, Prato =

Church in Prato, Italy

Coordinates: 43.883065°N 11.106327°E

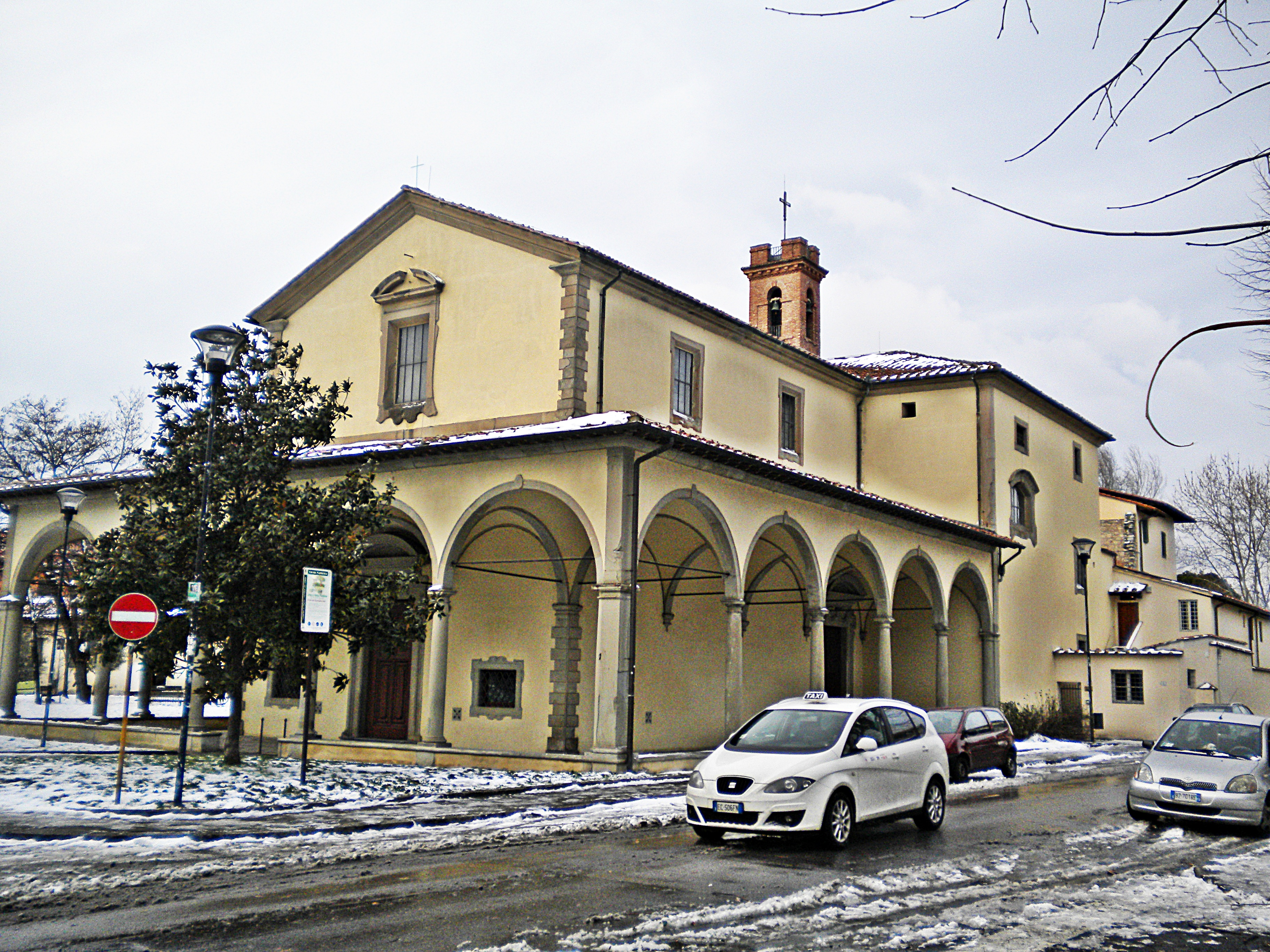
Exterior of Church

Santa Maria della Pietà is a Baroque-style, Roman Catholic church in Prato, region of Tuscany, Italy.

== History and description ==
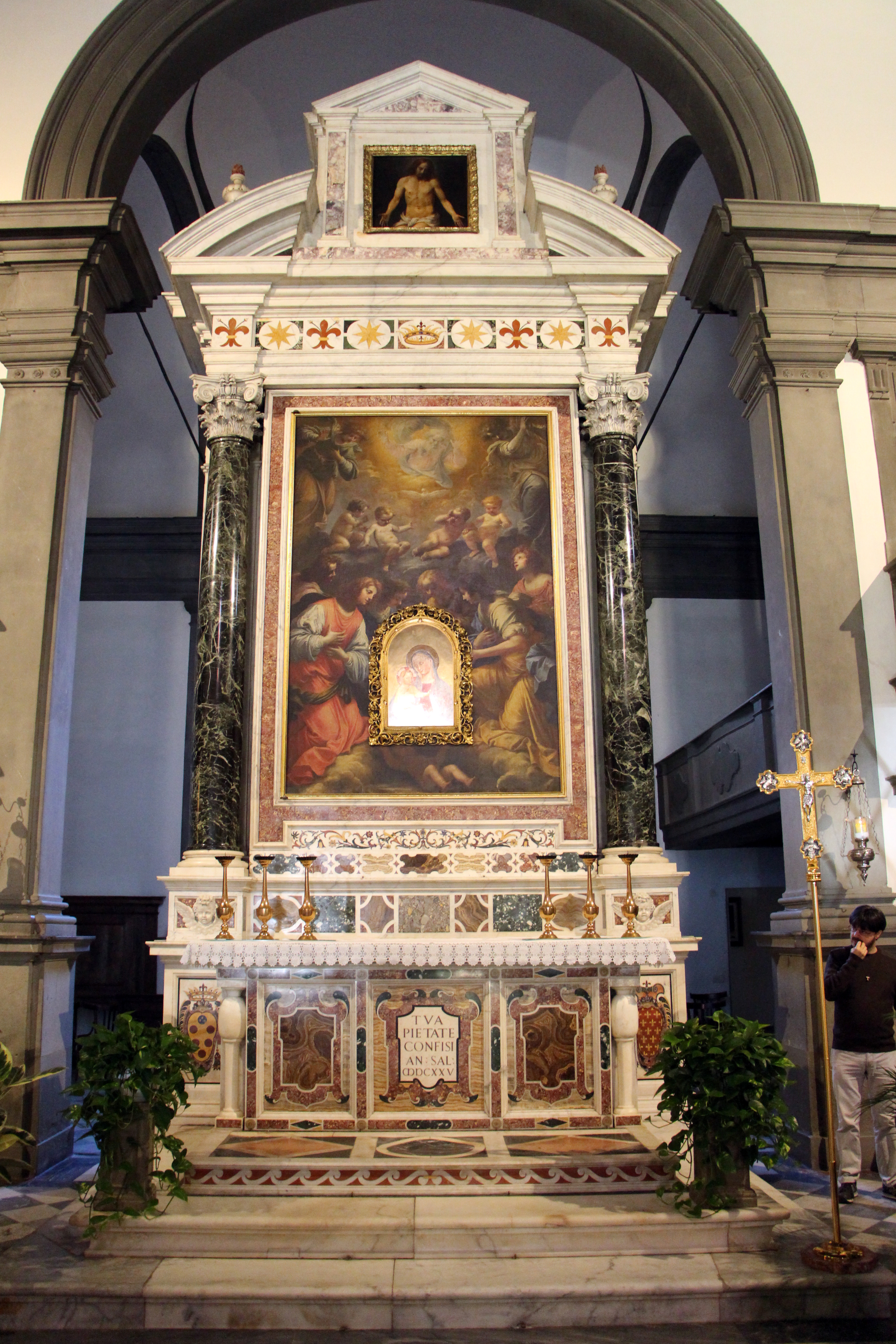
Main altar

The church was built between 1617-1620 to house a venerated 14th century icon of the Madonna and Child previously held in a tabernacle in the neighborhood (borgo) of Pesce. The church was designed by Gherardo Mechini who erected a typical Tuscan order portico. The interior has a delineated architecture recalling Brunelleschi churches. In 1699, the land adjacent was granted to the Discalced Carmelite nuns (Teresians), who built a convent. In 1786, the convent was suppressed, and the church became the Priory of Santa Caterina de’Ricci, but the Carmelites returned in 1792, and stayed until 1818, when they were moved to the Monastery of San Francesco. The Monastery was given to Gaetano Magnolfi to establish an orphanage and school. The former convent and orphanage is now a nursing home and cultural center.

The main altar was designed by mechini, but completed in polychrome marble by Giovanni Battista Cennini and Pier Maria Ciottoli. The main altar houses a 17th-century fresco of figures interacting with the framed 13th-century icon of the Madonna (1638), painted by Mario Balassi. This recalls the miraculous event in 1616 during which the Madonna from icon was observed to cry, are attributed to Giovanni Bonsi. Other paintings in the church include works by Matteo Bertini, Domenico Salvi, and Domenico Pedrini; and a St Theresa receives the Scapular from the Virgin by Alessandro Gherardini. In the piazza in front of the church is the ‘’Monument to Gaetano Magnolfi’’, patron of the former orphanage and school once located in the buildings annexed to the church.

== Gallery ==
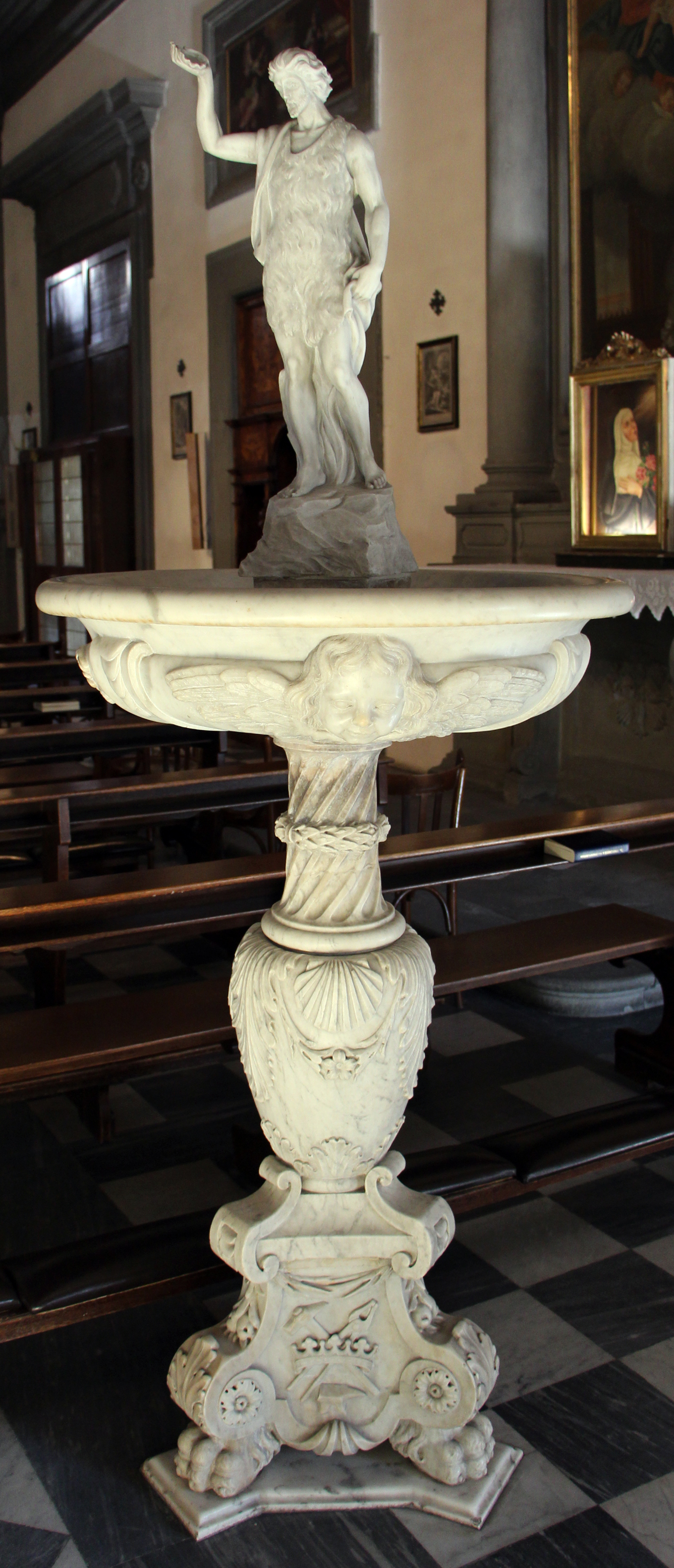
Holy water font by Cennini and Ciottoli

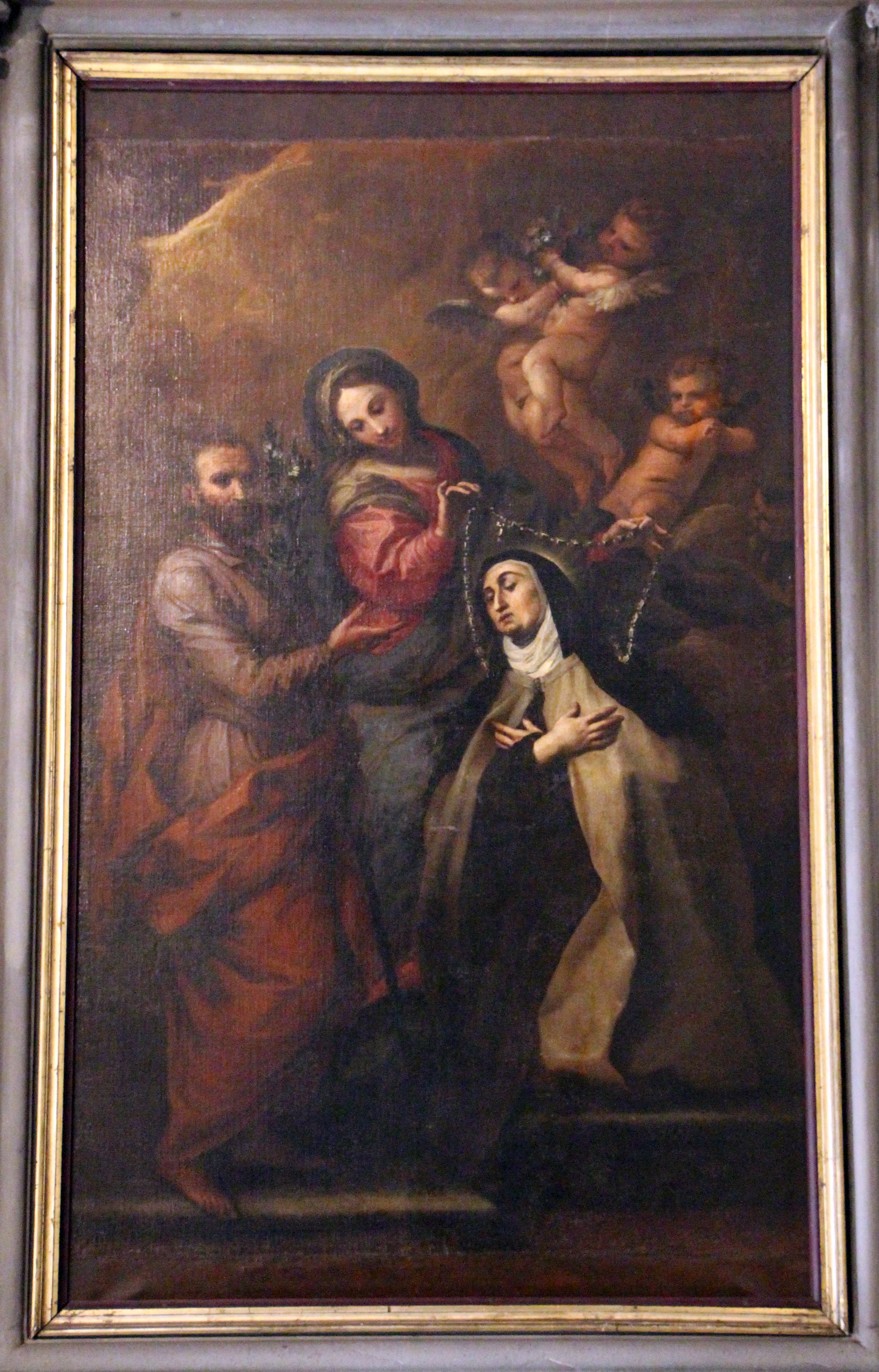
St Teresa by Gherardini

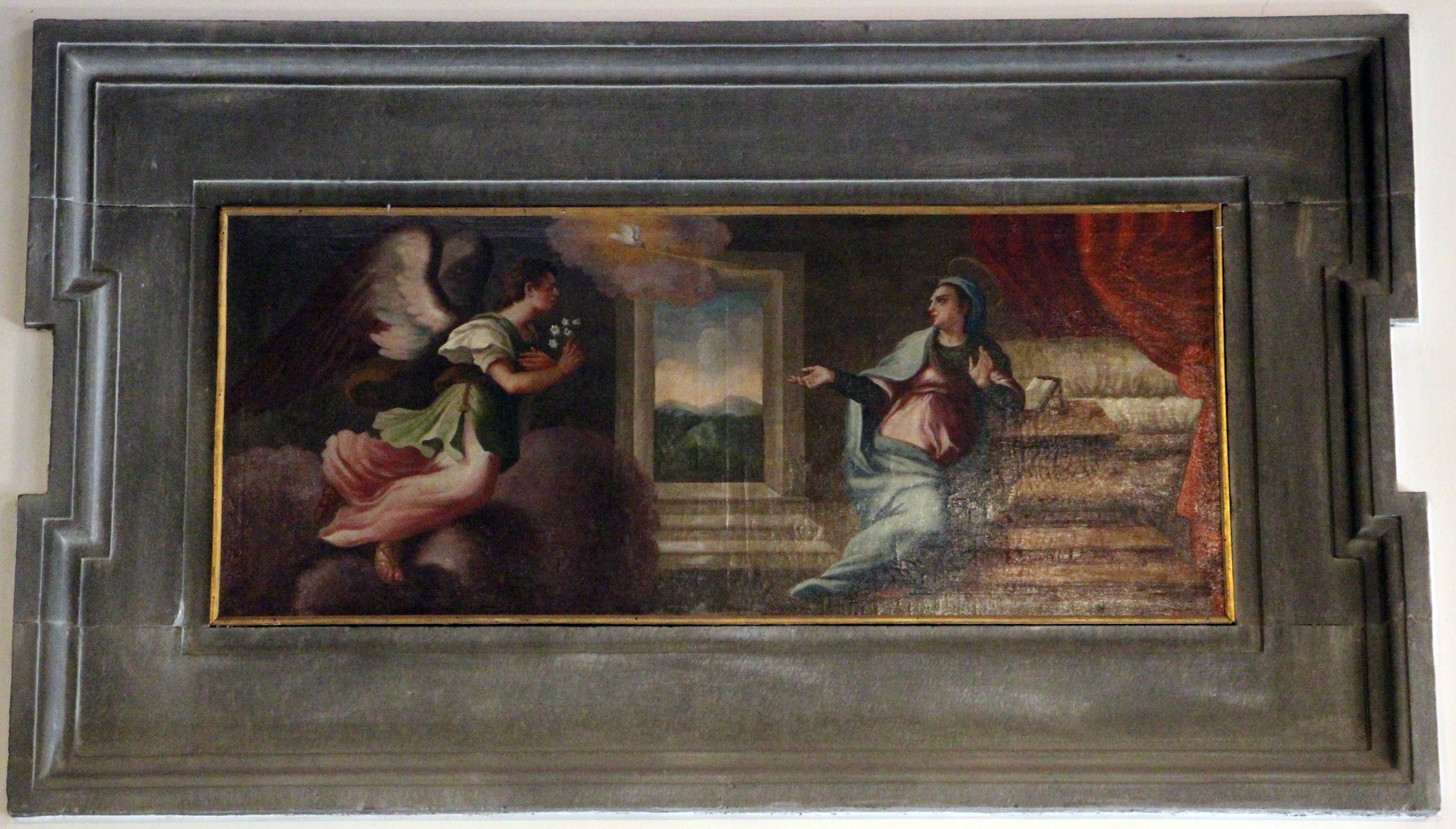
Annunciation by Bertini

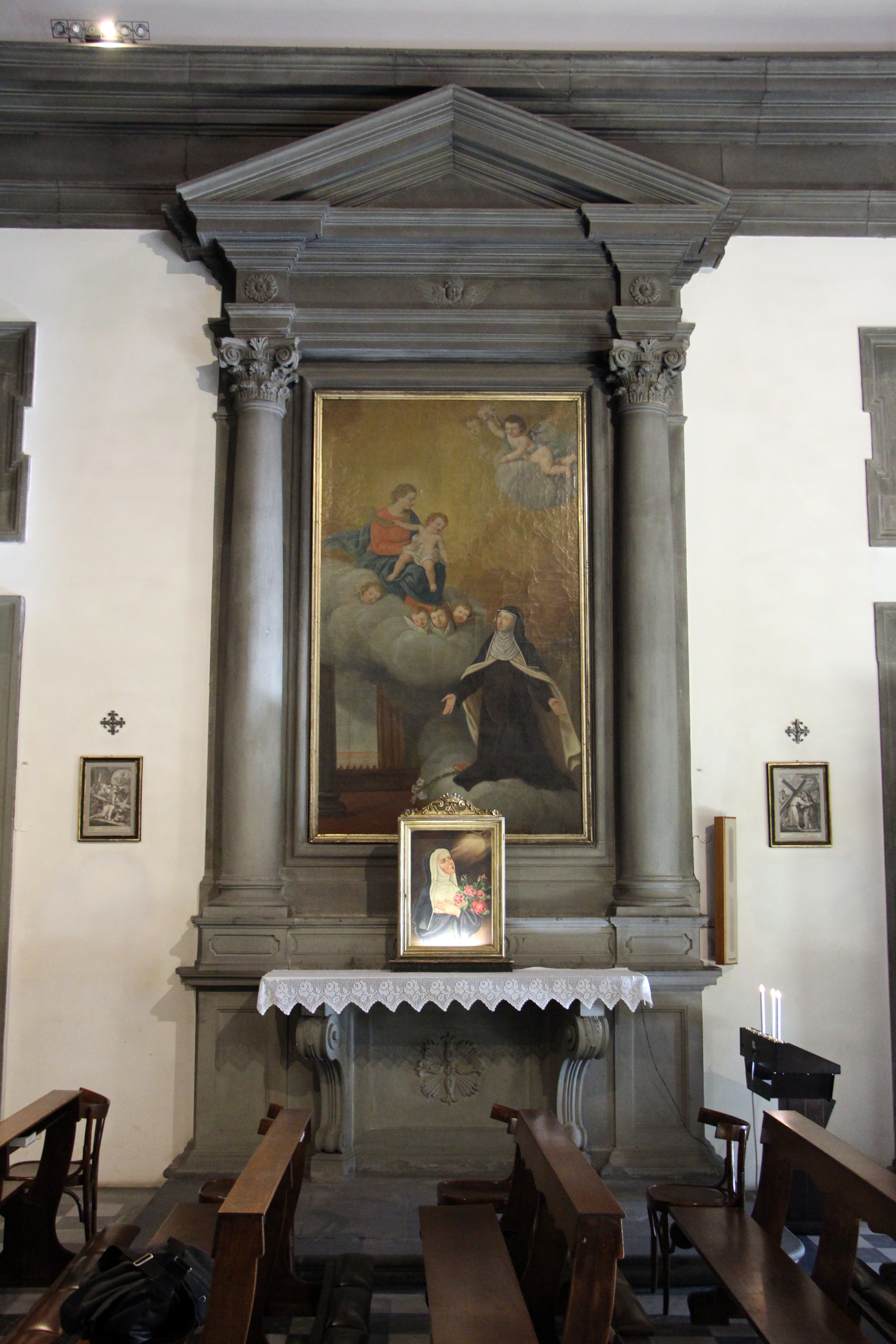
St Teresa's vision of Madonna & Child by Bertini

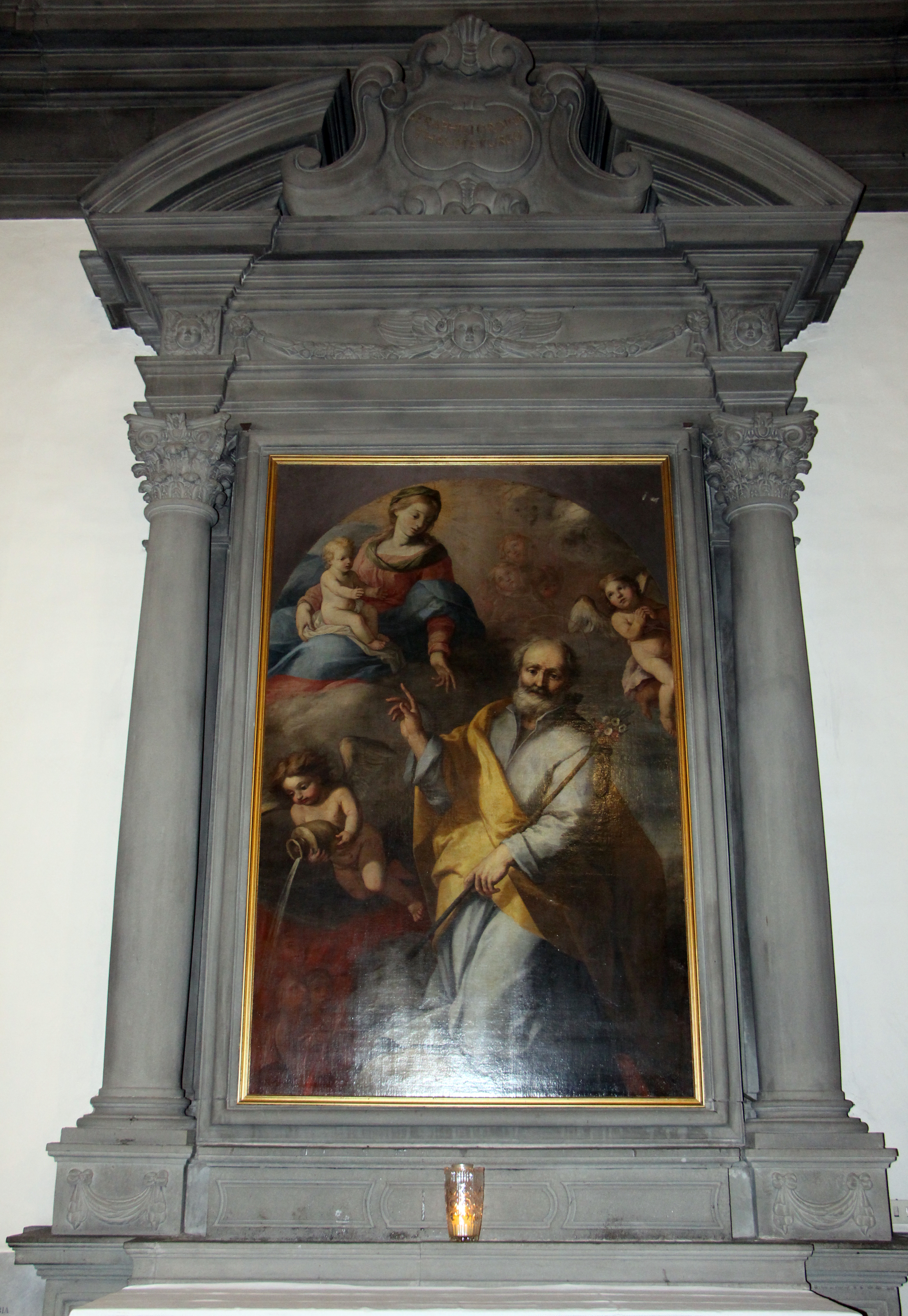
St Joseph intercedes for souls in Purgatory by Salvi

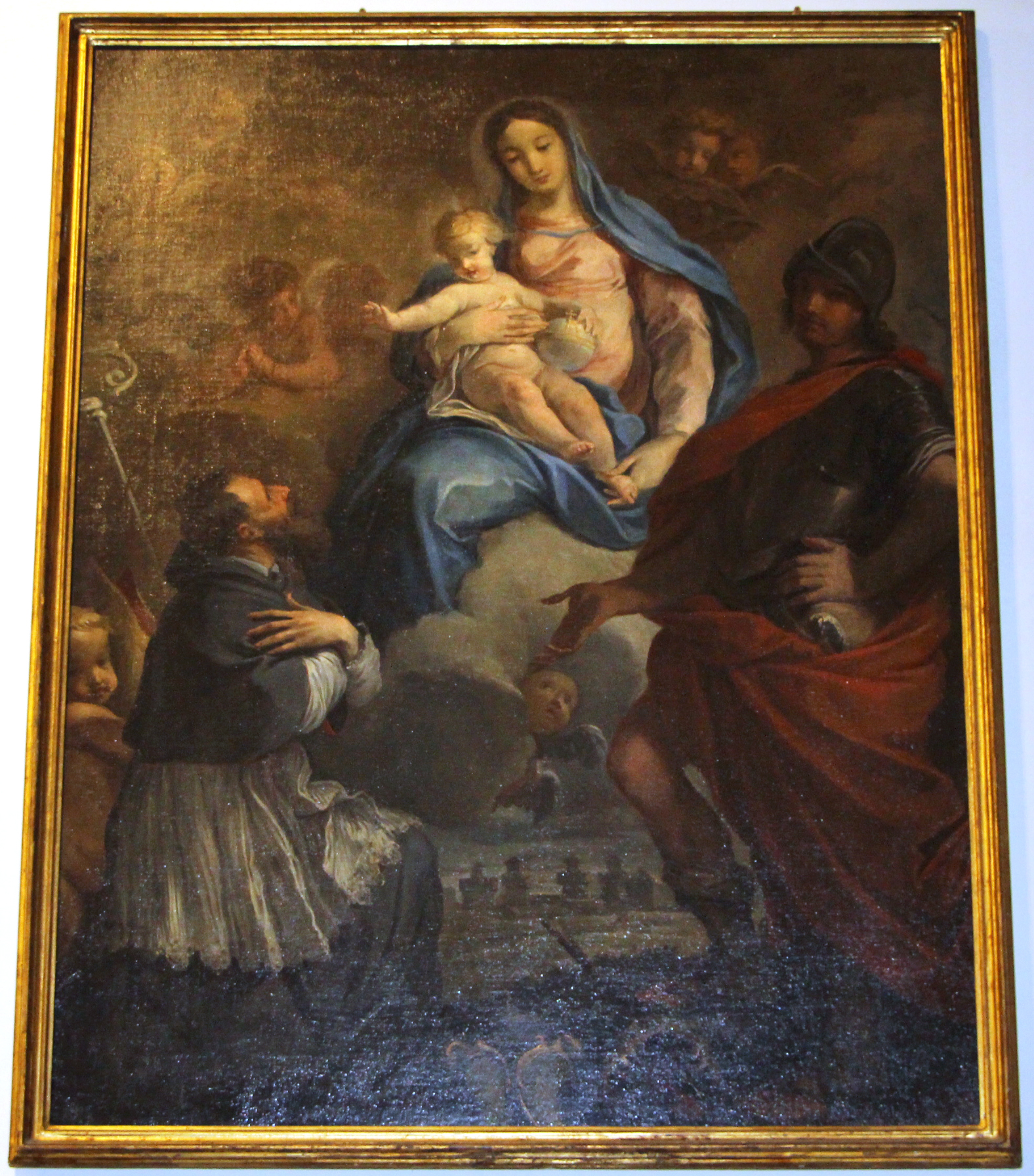
Virgin in Glory by Pedrini
