= D'Onofrio =

D'Onofrio or Donofrio is an Italian surname derived from the given name Onofrio. Notable people with the name include:

== D'Onofrio ==
- Brian D'Onofrio, American psychologist
- Carmen D'Onofrio (born 1974), Canadian soccer player
- Carol D'Onofrio (1936–2020), American public health researcher
- Daniele D'Onofrio (born 1993), Italian long-distance runner
- Denis D'Onofrio (born 1989), Italian footballer
- Dominique D'Onofrio (1953–2016), Italian football coach
- Elizabeth D'Onofrio (born 1957), American actress
- Francesco D'Onofrio (born 1939), Italian politician and academic
- François D'Onofrio (born 1990), Belgian footballer
- Giovanni D'Onofrio (born 1998), Italian rugby player
- Katerina D'Onofrio (born 1978), Peruvian actress
- Mark D'Onofrio (born 1969), American college football coach and former player
- Nicola D'Onofrio (1943–1984), Italian Camillian monk
- Terryana D'Onofrio (born 1997), Italian karateka
- Vincent D'Onofrio (born 1959), American actor

== Donofrio ==
- Beverly Donofrio (born 1950), American writer and teacher
- Edward Donofrio (born 1951), American fencer
- Heather Daly-Donofrio (born 1969), American golfer
- Nick Donofrio (born 1945), American scientist and engineer

== See also ==
- D'Onofrio (brand)
- Onofrio
- Onofri
