= Giovanni Bonsi =

Giovanni Bonsi may refer to:

- Giovanni Bonsi (painter) (died c. 1376)
- Jean de Bonsi (1554–1621), bishop of Béziers and cardinal
