= Onofri =

Onofri is an Italian surname derived from the given name Onofrio. Notable people with the surname include:

- Antonio Onofri (1759–1825), Sammarinese politician and diplomat
- Crescenzio Onofri (1634–1712/14), Italian painter
- Enrico Onofri (born 1967), Italian violinist and conductor
- Tommaso Onofri (2004–2006), Italian murder victim
- Vincenzo Onofri (fl. 1493 – c. 1524), Italian sculptor

== See also ==
- D'Onofrio
- Onofrio
