= San Onofre =

San Onofre or Santo Onofre may refer to:

- Onuphrius, known as San Onofre in Spanish and Santo Onofre in Portuguese, 4th-century Egyptian hermit honored as a saint in the Roman Catholic Church
- San Onofre, Sucre, a municipality in the Sucre Department of Colombia
- San Onofre State Beach, located in San Diego County, California
- San Onofre Nuclear Generating Station (SONGS), a nuclear power plant adjacent to the state beach
- Caldas da Rainha — Santo Onofre e Serra do Bouro, one of the twelve civil parishes of Caldas da Rainha in Portugal
- Santo Onofre River, in Brazil
