= Sant'Onofrio =

Sant'Onofrio is Italian for "St. Onuphrius". This name may refer to:

== Places ==
- Sant'Onofrio, Calabria, a municipality in Vibo Valentia, Calabria, Italy
- Sant'Onofrio, Campli, a frazione (submunicipal division) in Teramo, Abruzzo, Italy
- Sant'Onofrio, Lanciano, a frazione in Chieti, Abruzzo, Italy

=== Religious buildings ===
- Sant'Onofrio, Rome, a church in Rome, Lazio, Italy
- Hermitage of Sant'Onofrio, Serramonacesca, Abruzzo, Italy
- Hermitage of Sant'Onofrio al Morrone, Sulmona, Abruzzo, Italy

=== Other ===
- Sant'Onofrio a Porta Capuana, a music conservatory in Naples, Campania, Italy

== Artworks ==
- Sant'Onofrio Altarpiece by Luca Signorelli, on display at the Duomo of Orvieto, Umbria, Italy
