= Onuphrius =

Egyptian hermit and saint

Saint Onuphrius
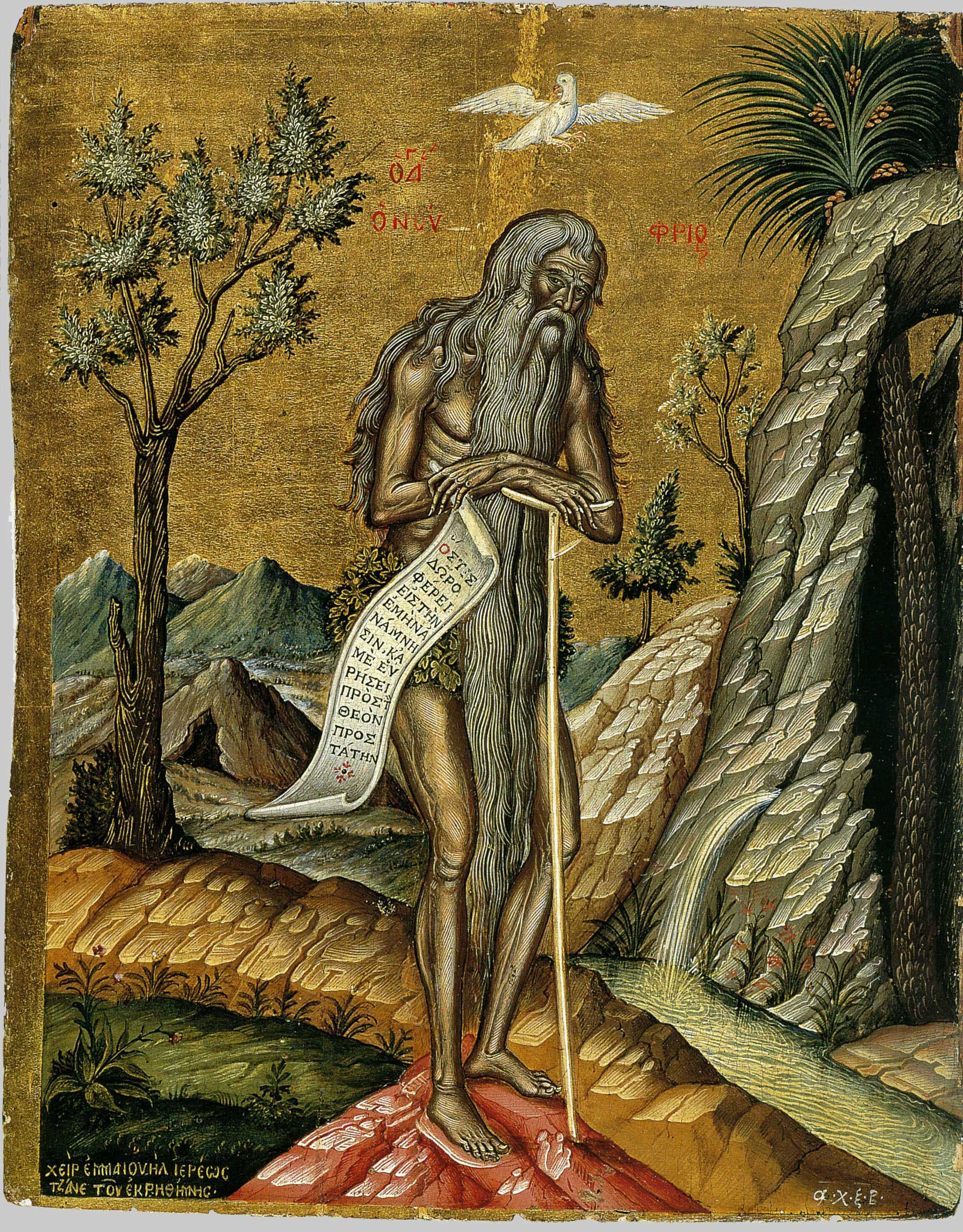
- Saint Onuphrius by Emmanuel Tzanes, 1662

Hermit
- Born: 320 AD; Ethiopia
- Died: 400 AD; Egypt
- Venerated in: Eastern Orthodox Church; Roman Catholic Church; Oriental Orthodox Churches; Eastern Catholic Churches
- Feast: 12 June (Western & Byzantine); 16 Paoni (Departure - Coptic Christianity); 16 Hathor (Consecration of Church - Coptic Christianity)
- Attributes: loincloth made from leaves, long beard and hair; hermit with an angel bringing him the Eucharist or bread; hermit with a crown at his feet
- Patronage: weavers; jurists Centrache, Italy

Onuphrius or Onophrios (Latin; Ancient Greek: Ὀνούφριος, Onoúphrios) lived as a hermit in the desert of Upper Egypt in the 4th or 5th centuries. He is venerated as Saint Onuphrius in both the Roman Catholic and Eastern Catholic churches, as Venerable Onuphrius in Eastern Orthodoxy, and as Saint Nofer the Anchorite (Arabic: نوفر) in Oriental Orthodoxy.

== Life and legends ==
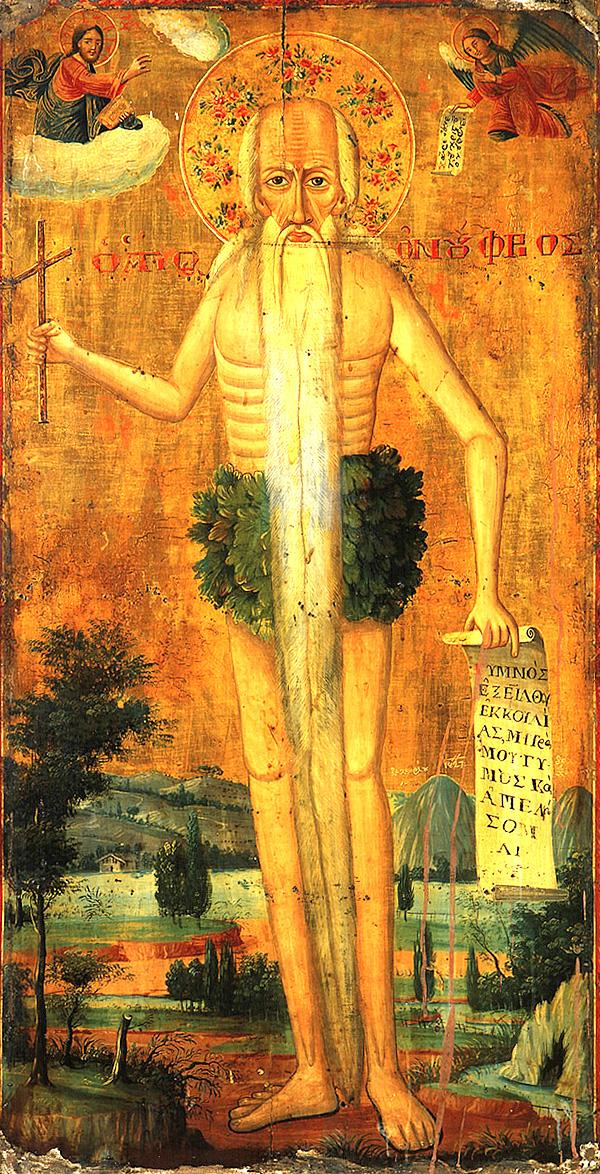
Saint Onuphrius

Onuphrius was one of the Desert Fathers who made a great impression on Eastern spirituality in the third and fourth centuries, around the time that Christianity was emerging as the dominant faith of the Roman Empire. At this time many Christians were inspired to go out into the desert and live in prayer in the harsh environment of extreme heat and cold, with little to eat and drink, surrounded by all sorts of dangerous animals and robbers.

It is uncertain in which century Onuphrius lived; the account of Paphnutius the Ascetic, who encountered him in the Egyptian desert, forms the sole source for our knowledge of the life of Saint Onuphrius. Even the authorship is uncertain; "Paphnutius", a common name of Egyptian origin in the Upper Thebaid, may refer to Paphnutius of Scetis, a 4th-century abbot of Lower Egypt, rather than Paphnutius the Ascetic. "But Paphnutius the Great [i.e. Paphnutius the Ascetic]," Alban Butler writes, "also had a number of stories to tell of visions and miraculous happenings in the desert, some of them in much the same vein as the story of Onuphrius."

The name Onuphrius is thought to be a Hellenized form of a Coptic name Unnufer, ultimately from the Egyptian wnn-nfr meaning "perfect one", or "he who is continually good", an epithet of the god Osiris.

A tradition, not found in Paphnutius' account, states that Onuphrius had studied jurisprudence and philosophy before becoming a monk near Thebes and then a hermit.

According to Paphnutius's account, Paphnutius undertook a pilgrimage to study the hermits' way of life and to determine whether it was for him. Wandering in the desert for 16 days, on the 17th day, Paphnutius came across a wild figure covered in hair, wearing a loincloth of leaves. Frightened, Paphnutius ran away, up a mountain, but the figure called him back, shouting, "Come down to me, man of God, for I am a man also, dwelling in the desert for the love of God."

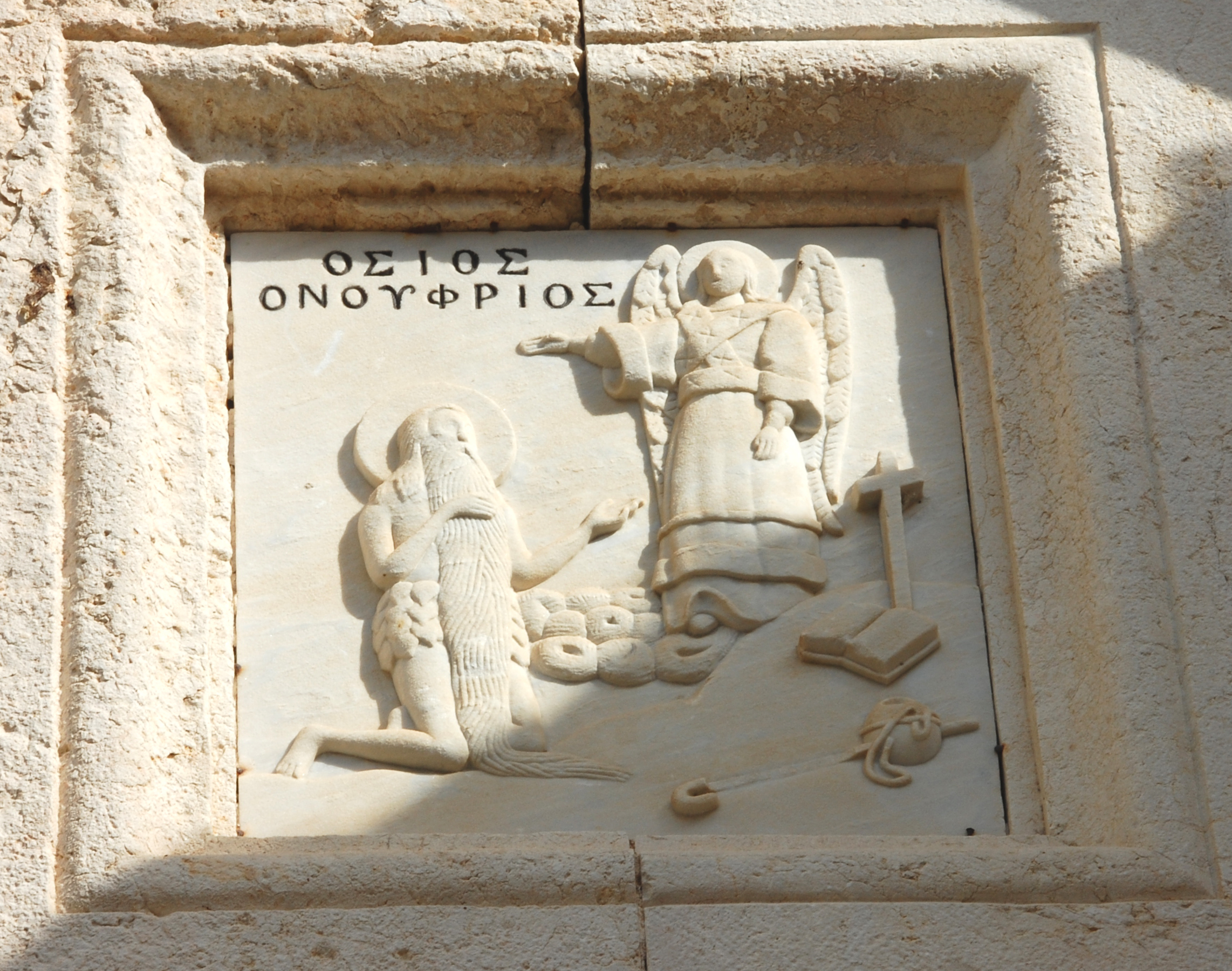
Stone carving above the entrance of the St. Onuphrius Monastery in Akeldama, Jerusalem (Potter's field). The image shows Onuphrius bowing down to an angel. Notable features are his long beard and leaf loincloth.

Turning back, Paphnutius talked to the wild figure, who introduced himself as Onuphrius and explained that he had once been a monk at a large monastery in the Thebaid but had now lived as a hermit for 70 years, enduring extreme thirst, hunger, and discomfort. He said that it was his guardian angel who had brought him to this desolate place. Onuphrius took Paphnutius to his cell, and they spoke until sunset, when bread and water miraculously appeared outside of the hermit's cell.

They spent the night in prayer, and in the morning, Paphnutius discovered that Onuphrius was near death. Paphnutius, distressed, asked the hermit if he should occupy Onuphrius' cell after the hermit's death, but Onuphrius told him, "That may not be, thy work is in Egypt with thy brethren." Onuphrius asked Paphnutius for there to be a memorial with incense in Egypt in remembrance of the hermit. He then blessed the traveler and died.

Due to the hard and rocky ground, Paphnutius could not dig a hole for a grave, and therefore covered Onuphrius' body in a cloak, leaving the hermit's body in a cleft of the rocks. After the burial, Onuphrius' cell crumbled, which Paphnutius took to be a sign that he should not stay.

One scholar has written that Onuphrius' life "fits the mold of countless desert hermits or anchorites. ...[However] despite its predictability, Paphnutius' Life of Onuphrius is marked by several unique details. ...The years of Onuphrius' youth were passed in a monastery that observed the rule of strict silence; a hind instructed him in Christian rites and liturgy. During his sixty years in the desert, Onuphrius' only visitor was an angel who delivered a Host every Sunday."

== Veneration ==
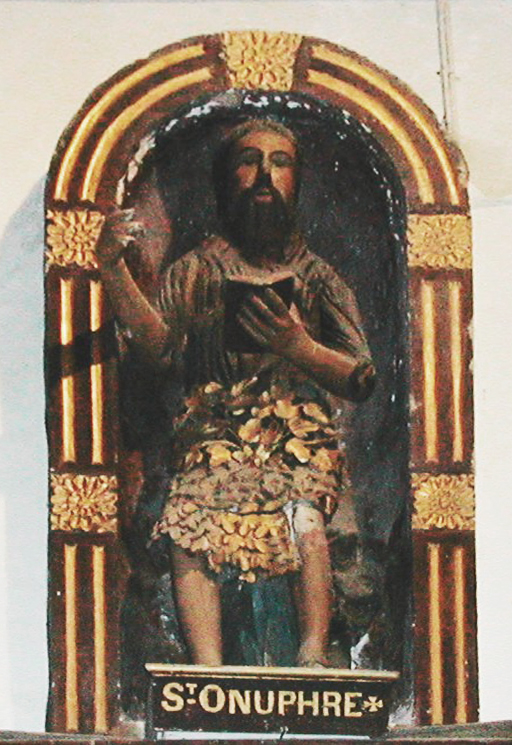
Onuphrius depicted as a "wild man".

Both the Eastern Orthodox and Catholic churches traditionally mark his feast day on 12 June. A Life of Onuphrius of later Greek origin states that the saint died on June 11; however, his feast day was celebrated on June 12 in the Eastern Orthodox calendars from an early date.

The legend of Saint Onuphrius was depicted in Pisa's camposanto (monumental cemetery), and in Rome the church Sant'Onofrio was built in his honor on the Janiculan Hill in the fifteenth century.

Antony, the archbishop of Novgorod, writing around 1200 AD, stated that Onuphrius' head was conserved in the church of Saint Acindinus (Akindinos), Constantinople.

For several decades, Orthodox seminarians in Poland have begun their spiritual training in the monastery of St. Onuphrius in Jablechna. It is said that the saint himself chose the place for it, appearing nearly four hundred years ago to fishermen and leaving them an icon of himself on the banks of the river Bug.

The St. Onuphrius Monastery in Jerusalem is located at the far end of Gai Ben Hinnom, the Gehenna valley of hell, situated within the site of a Jewish cemetery from the Second Temple period. The structure is built among and includes many typical burial niches common to that period. The monastery also marks the location of Hakeldama, the purported place where Judas Iscariot hanged himself.

Saint Onuphrius was venerated in Munich, Basel, and southern Germany, and the Basel humanist Sebastian Brant (who named his own son Onuphrius) published a broadside named In Praise of the Divine Onuphrius and Other Desert Hermit Saints. Onuphrius was depicted in a 1520 painting by Hans Schäufelein.

=== Art ===
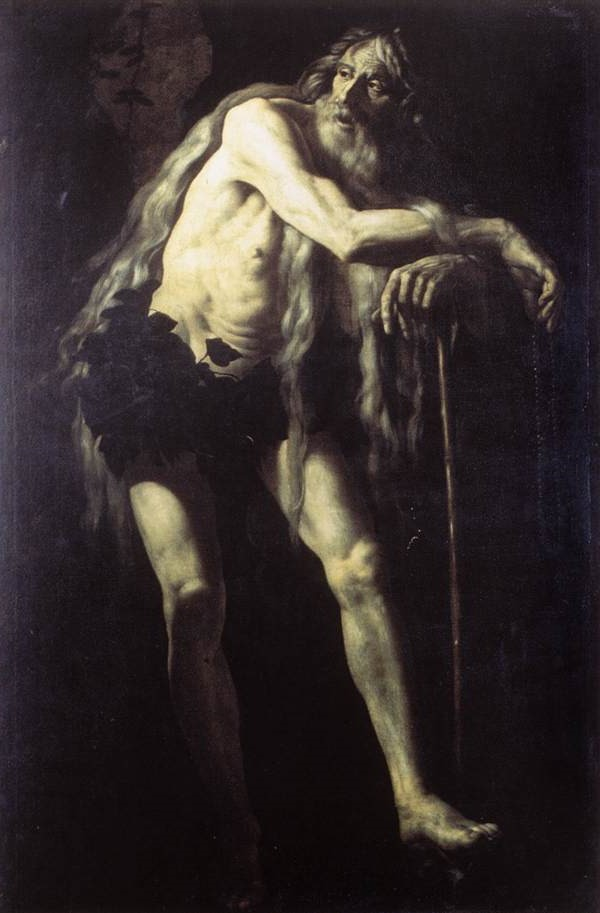
Battistello Caracciolo, Galleria Nazionale d'Arte Antica, Rome

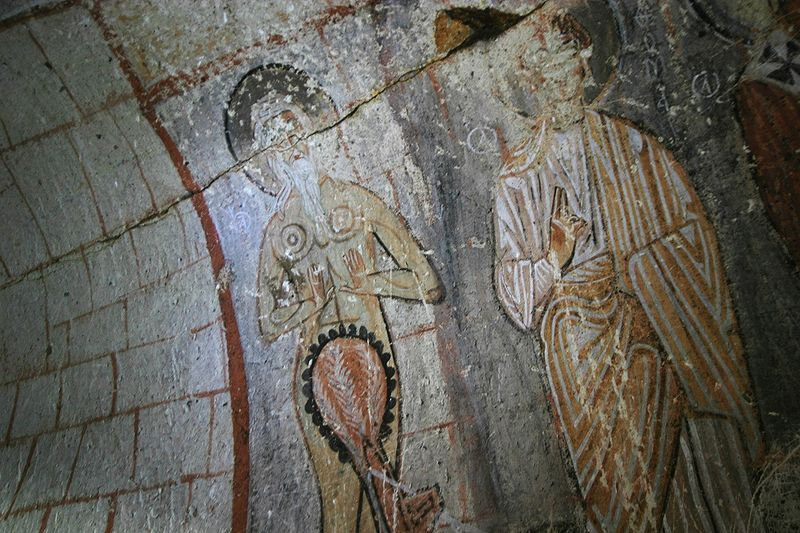
Fresco of Onuphrius (on left) in the Snake Church.

Images of Saint Onuphrius were conflated with those of the medieval "wild man". In art, he is depicted as a wild man completely covered with hair, wearing a girdle of leaves.

He is depicted at Snake Church (Yilanlı Kilise) in the Göreme valley open-air museum in Cappadocia, Turkey.

He became the patron saint of weavers due to the fact that he was depicted "dressed only in his own abundant hair, and a loincloth of leaves".

He (S. Onofrio) was named co-patron of the city of Palermo in 1650.

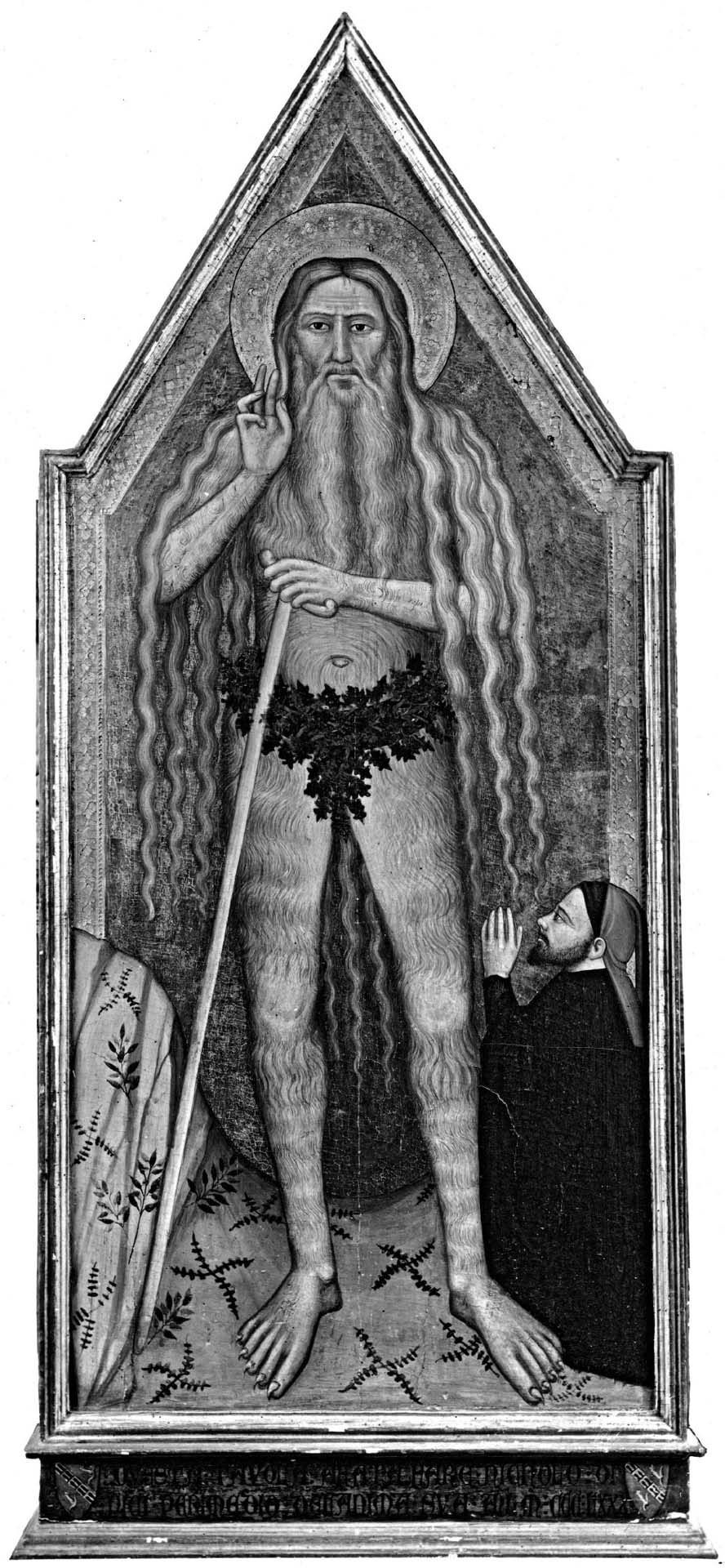
Giovanni Bonsi, "Saint Humphrey with a Donor," 1380, Villa La Pietra, Florence, photo by Foto Reali, Foto Reali Archive, Department of Image Collections, National Gallery of Art Library, Washington, DC

=== Name variants ===
His name appears very variously as Onuphrius, Onouphrius, Onofrius and in different languages as Onofre (Portuguese, Spanish), Onofrei (Romanian), Onofrio (Italian), etc. In Arabic, the saint was known as Abū Nufir (Arabic: ابو نفر) or as Nofer (Arabic: نوفر), which, besides being a variant of the name Onuphrius, also means "herbivore". Onuphrius and Onofrio are sometimes Anglicized as Humphrey, an unrelated name that is usually given a Germanic etymology.

=== Folklore ===
Sicilians pray to Saint Onuphrius when they have lost something. The prayer has many variants, but it generally mentions the miraculous properties of Saint Onuphrius' hair. It is widely accepted that repeating the prayer whilst looking for something like keys, a misplaced ring, or anything else, will greatly help in finding it sooner.

St Onophrius' remains (Reliquary) are held in a sanctuary at Sutera (Sicily), where a feast is held in his honour every 1st Sunday of August and the saint's remains are carried around the town with a priest, marching band and pilgrims.

== See also ==
- San Onofre
- Venerable
- Hermit
- St. Onuphrius Monastery
