= Gaetano Magnolfi =

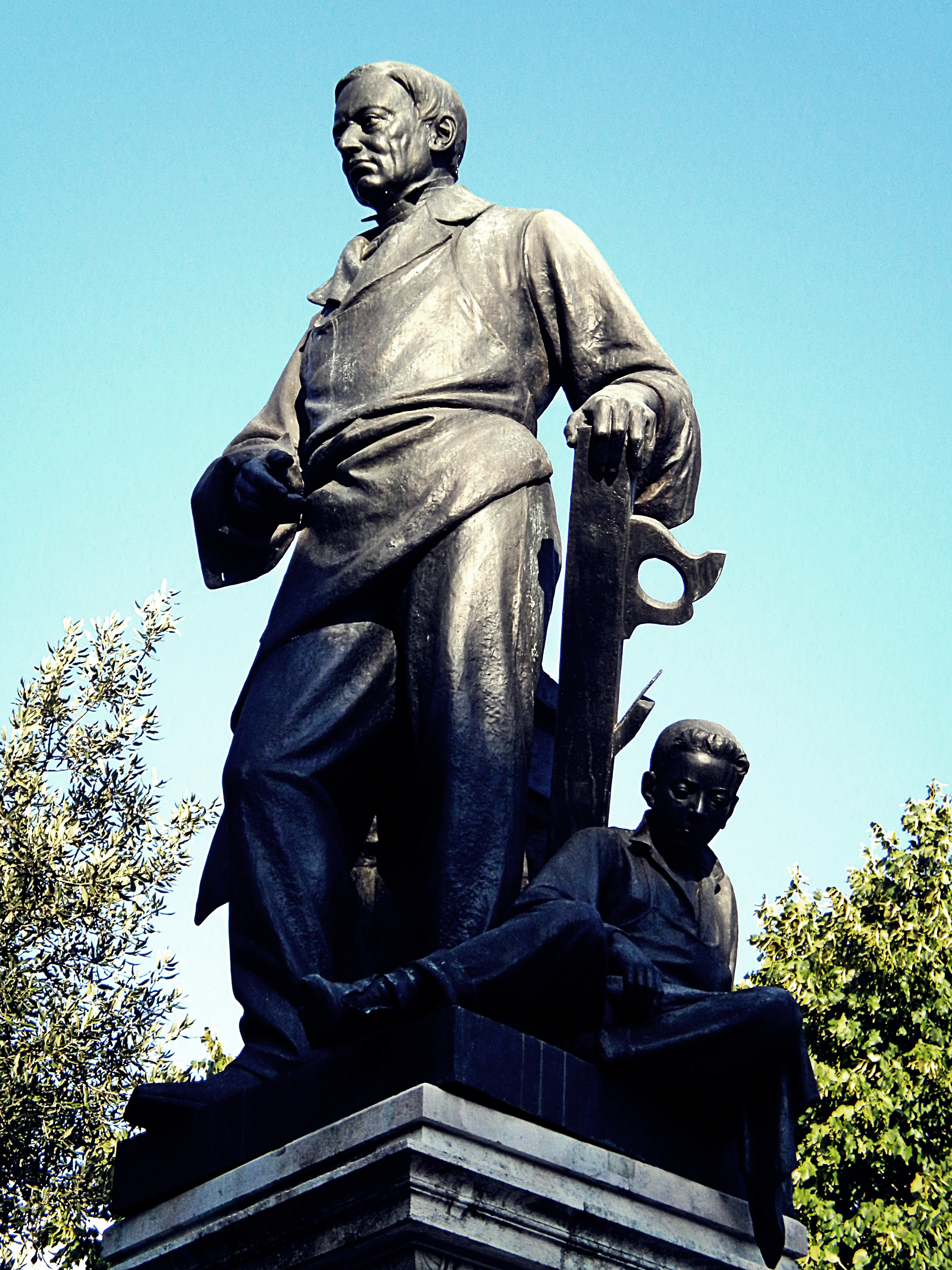
Monument to Magnolfi

Gaetano Magnolfi (12 November 1786 – 4 August 1867) was an Italian philanthropist, active mainly in his native Prato, a town in the then Grand Duchy of Tuscany.

== Biography ==
Born to an impoverished family in Prato, he lost his mother by age 18 years; his wife, at the age of 30 years. He had become a wealthy businessman through contracts to provide the Grand Duchy of Tuscany with carpenters and woodworkers. By 1833, he had been elected as a municipal magistrate, and he had funded a school for young poor children, making them literate, and teaching them the trade of sewing. In 1838 he purchased the suppressed Convent of the Carmelites and transformed it into a hospice and a technical (trade) school or institute called the "Orfanotrofio Tecnologico della Pietà", which was focused on helping orphan and abandoned children. The school granted laboratory space to local artisans if they took on orphans as paid apprentices.

Magnolfi was awarded a medal for his efforts supporting the orphans. In the third Congress of Scientists, (1841) held in Florence, the innovation of this technological orphanage were praised by Enrico Mayer, a pedagogist and fellow philanthropist from Livorno, as a model for such institutions.

Magnolfi also helped found a Cassa di Risparmio in Prato, a bank which allocated loans to small businesses and craftsmen. Magnolfi helped fund the railway line (1848) connecting Florence, Prato, and Pistoia.

In 1898, a speech commemorating Magnolfi, was published to and its sale used to fund the bronze monument placed in 1900 at the Piazza Santa Maria della Pietà, Prato, close to the orphanage. The speech compares Magnolfi to the local 15th-century philanthropist Francesco Datini. The statue, sculpted by Oreste Chilleri, unfortunately inaccurately depicts him dressed as a laboring carpenter, despite his main role being the financial management of wood working in the state. It also includes a child at his feet, recalling his focus on the orphanage. The statue was transferred to Piazza del Duomo for about twenty years, only to be finally relocated to its inaugural site.

Magnolfi was buried at a chapel built in his orphanage, designed by Fortunato Rocchi, instructor of design at the institute, and frescoed by Eustachio Turchini, containing a bas-relief donated by the Ginori porcelain company, and a sculpted monument by Vincenzio Chilleri with a bust by Egisto Giampaoli, a pupil of Dupre.
