= St. Onuphrius Monastery =

Orthodox monastery in the Biblical potter's field

Coordinates: 31°46′05″N 35°14′00″E

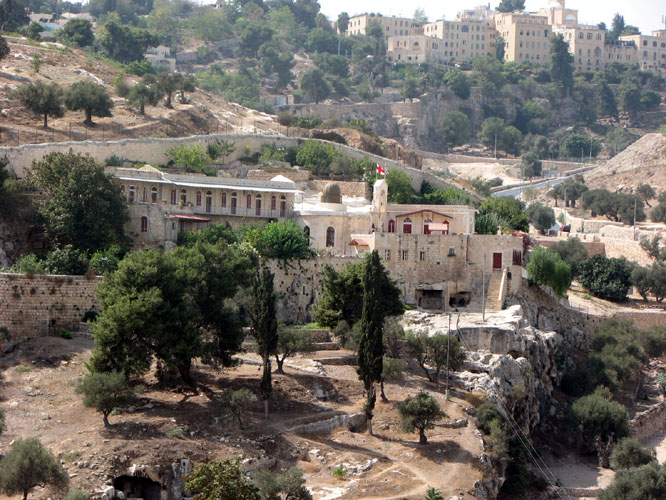
View of the monastery

The St. Onuphrius Monastery (Greek: Ιερά Μονή του Οσίου Ονουφρίου) is an Orthodox monastery for women located in the potter's field (Akeldama in Aramaic) that the Jewish elders purchased with the thirty pieces of silver returned by Judas Iscariot that had been given for betraying Jesus. The location is south of the Old City of Jerusalem and on the southern slope of the Gehenna valley, close to the Kidron Valley. Subject to the Greek Orthodox Church of Jerusalem, it is named after the fourth-century anchorite monk Saint Onuphrius.

== History ==
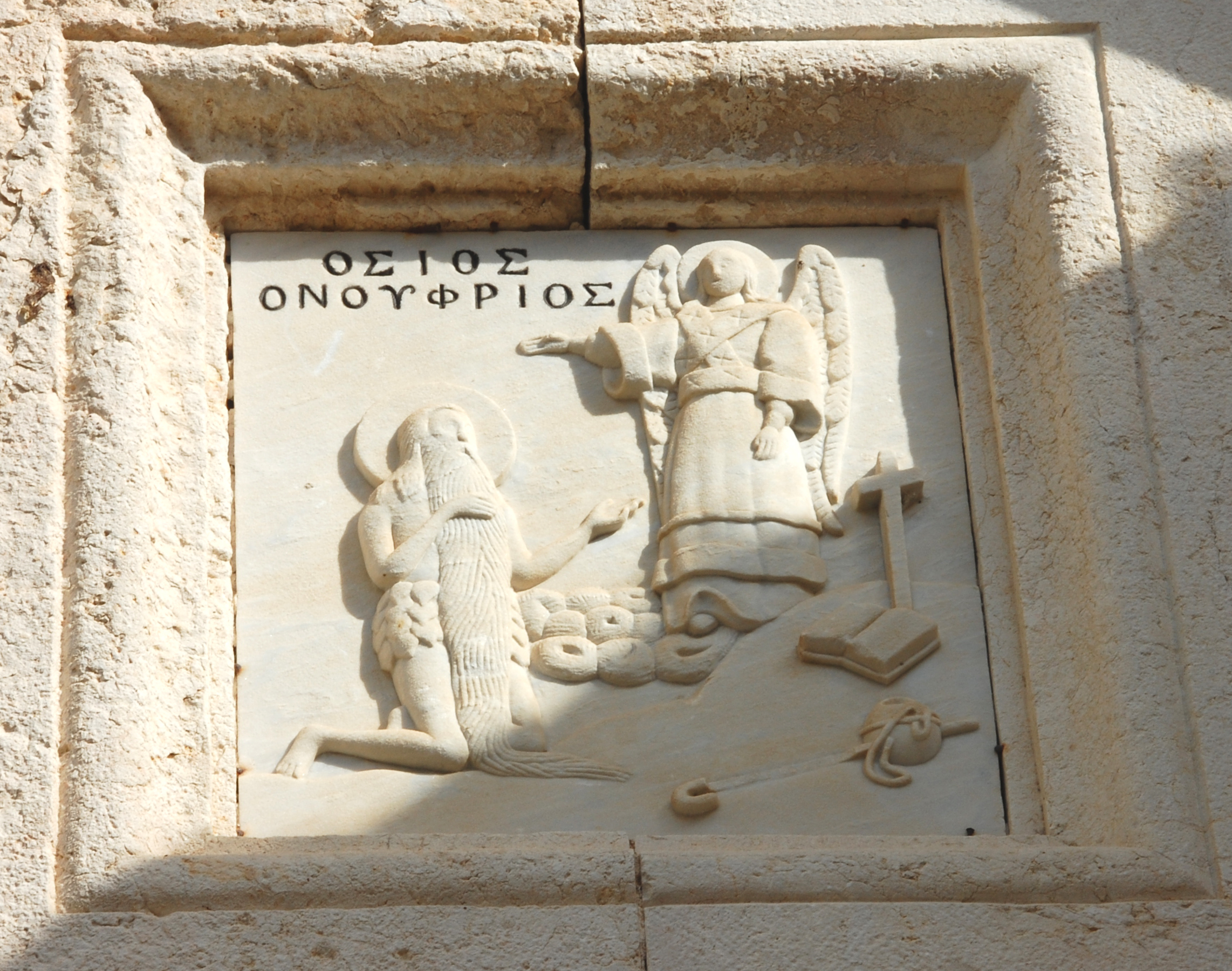
Bas-relief at the entrance represents Saint Onuphrius in prayer

The monastery was built in 1892 on the site of an early Christian graveyard, consisting of niches hewn into the rock face; during the fourth century, this is where Saint Onuphrius the Anchorite would sit in prayer. In addition to the cave occupied by Saint Onuphrius, there is the Cave of the Apostles, where the Apostles are said to have hidden during the Crucifixion. An underground church has existed since the time of Constantine I (306–312), and has been enlarged over the centuries. It has been consecrated to Saint Onuphrius, with the grottoes found in the southern part of the church. From this period, the Orthodox have conserved the custom of dedicating a number of funeral chapels to Saint Onuphrius.

According to Ermete Pierotti, one of the tombs over which the church was built is "remarkable for its elaborate façade," and was believed by Ernst Gustav Schultz to be the monument of Ananus the High-priest, as it shows elements dating back to the Herodian age and built of the Doric order. According to Pierotti, "the frieze is divided by triglyphs, having eight metopes, each charged with a patera of a different pattern."

The present monastery was built in the nineteenth century. It includes terraces that dominate the floor of the valley.

According to a tradition mentioned by J.E. Hanauer, the Arab residents of Silwan claimed that the rock-cut sepulchers beneath the monastery contain the remains of Christian hermits executed during the persecutions of Fatimid ruler Al-Hakim bi-Amr Allah.

== Gallery ==
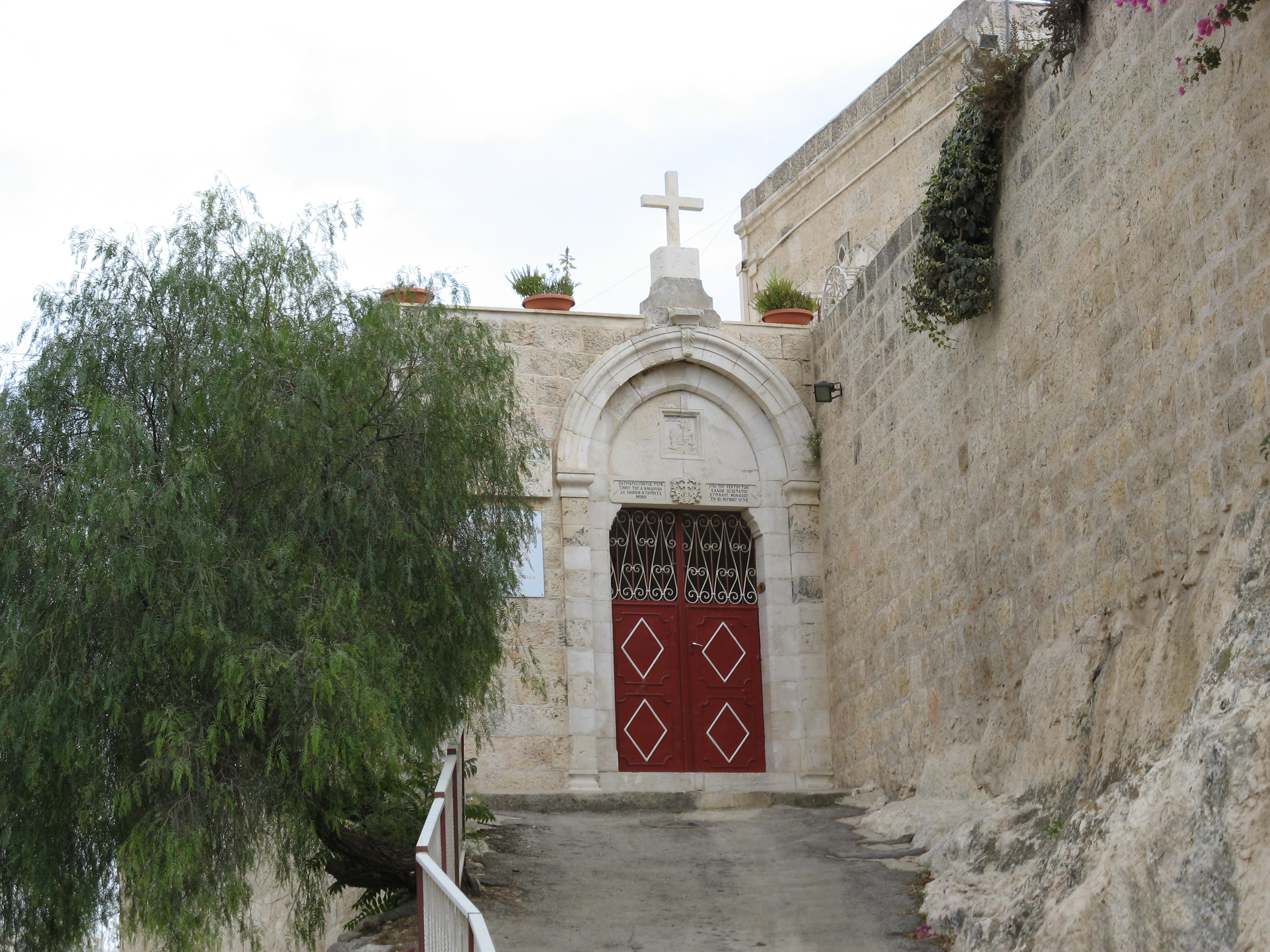
Main approach

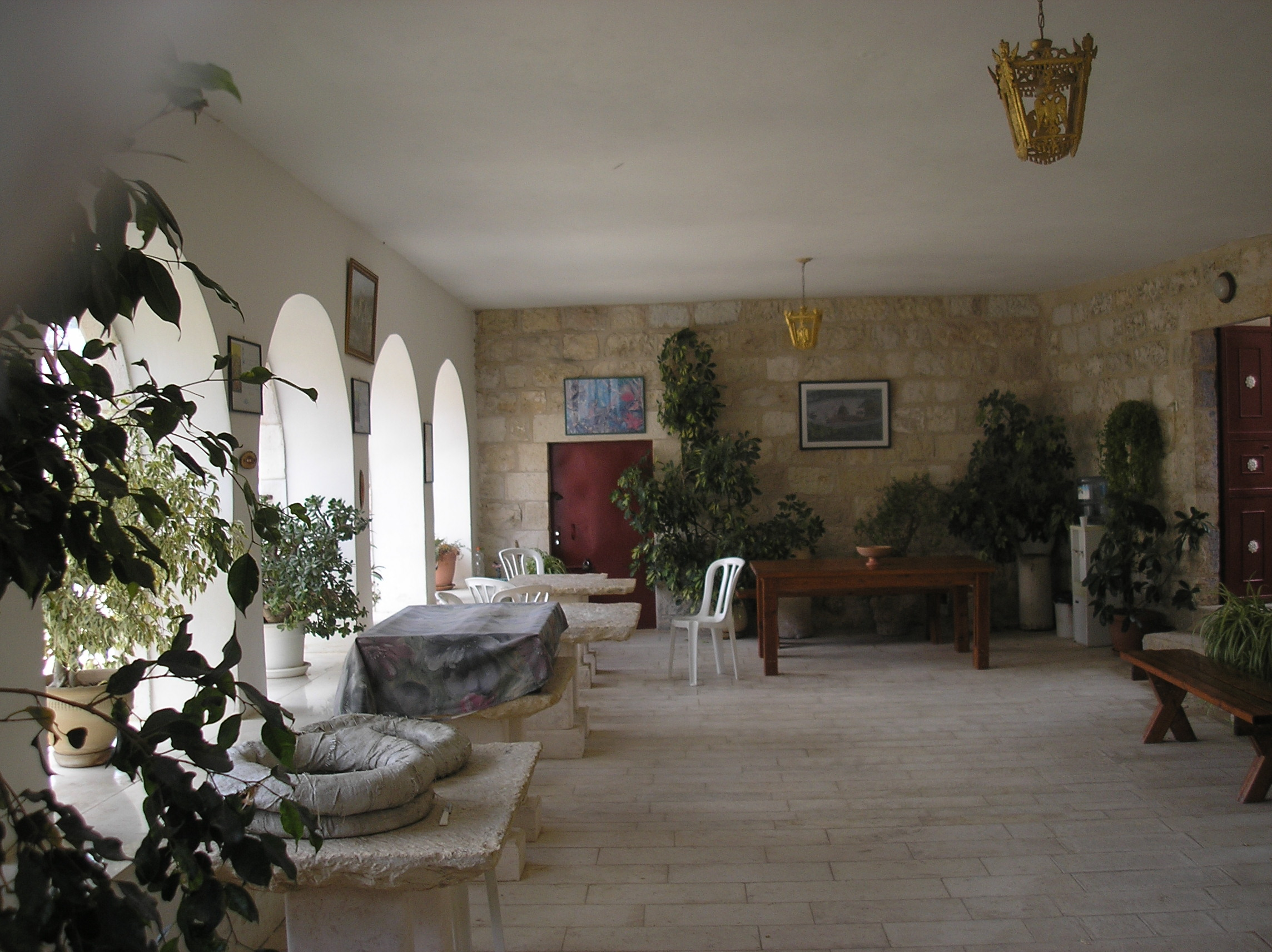
Entry terrace

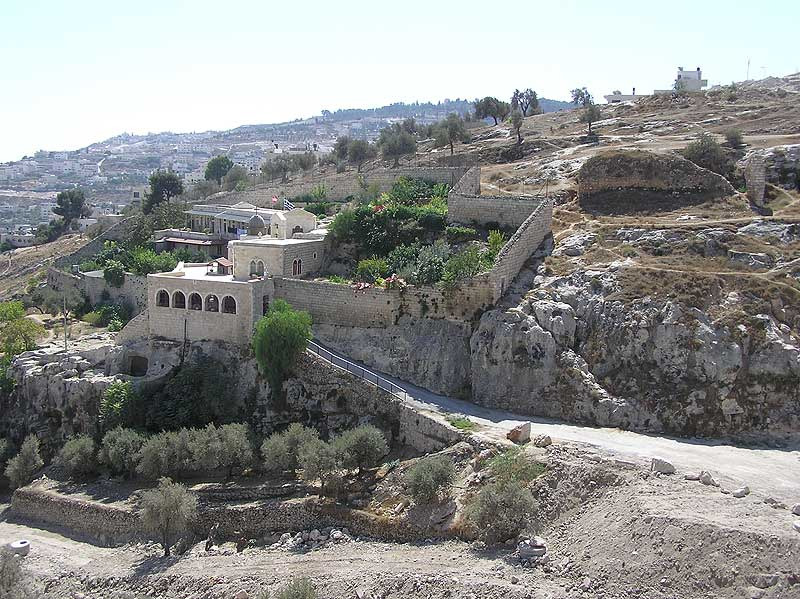
Approach road and garden of the monastery

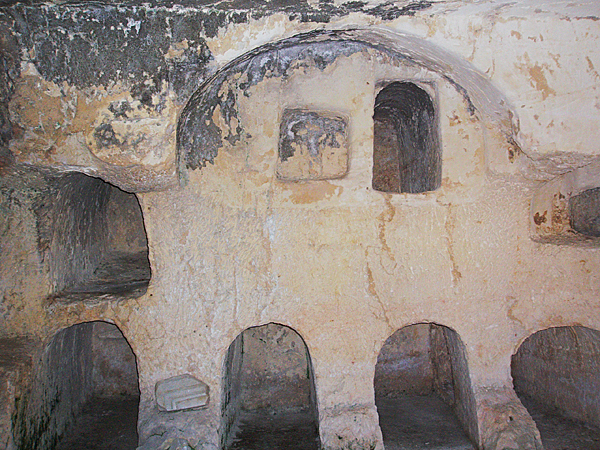
Columbarium niches

== Bibliography ==
- (In Russian) Archimandrite Léonide (Kavéline), La vieille ville de Jérusalem et ses environs, Indrik, 2008.

== Source ==
- Translated from French, which in turn was transl. ru – transl. Монастырь Онуфрия Великого (Акелдама)
