= Akeldama =

Historic site in Jerusalem

- ܚܩܠ ܕܡܐ
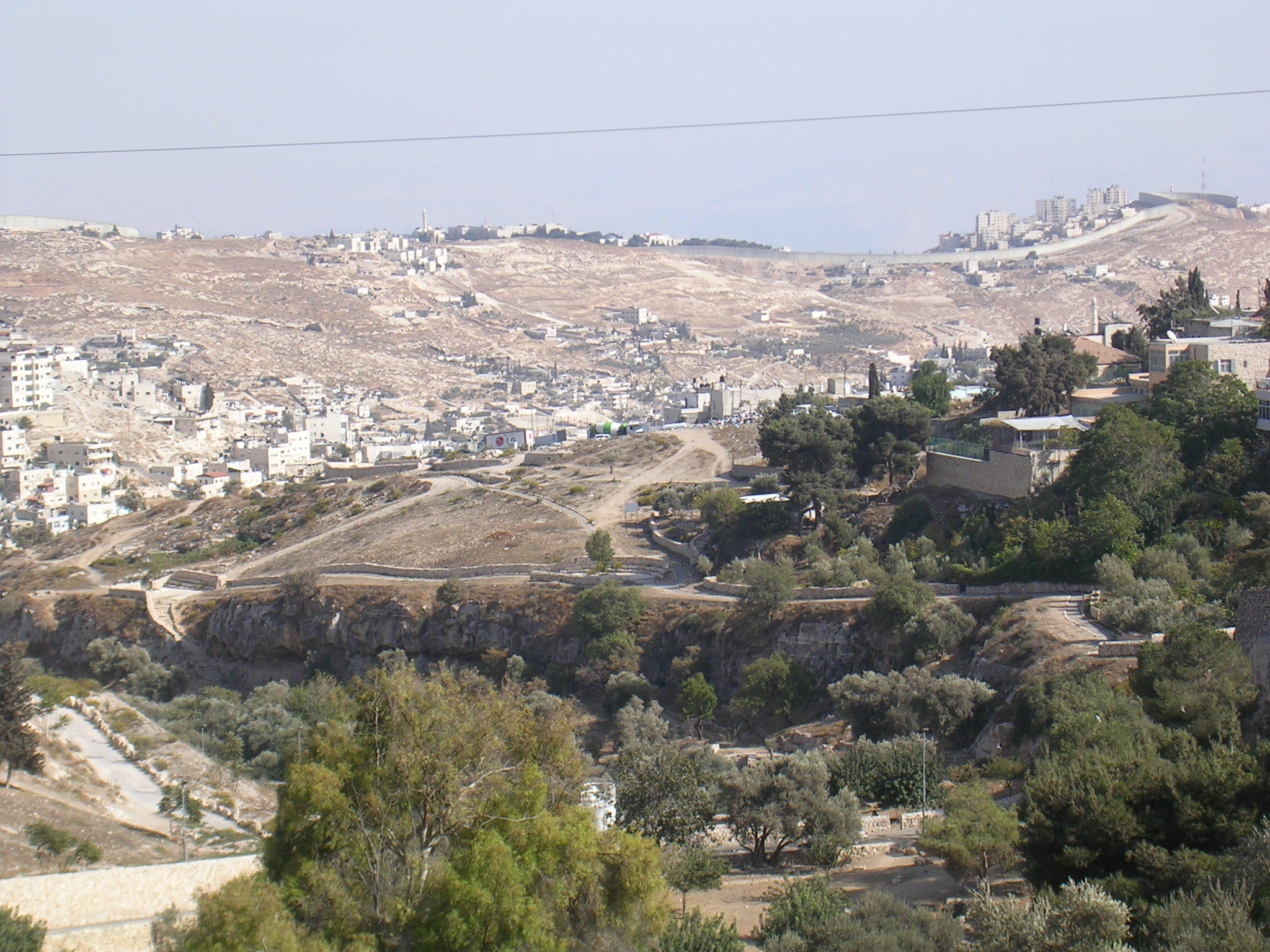
- Interactive map of Akeldama

Details
- Location: Jerusalem
- Coordinates: 31°46′06″N 35°13′58″E
- Type: Potter's field
- Owned by: St. Onuphrius Monastery

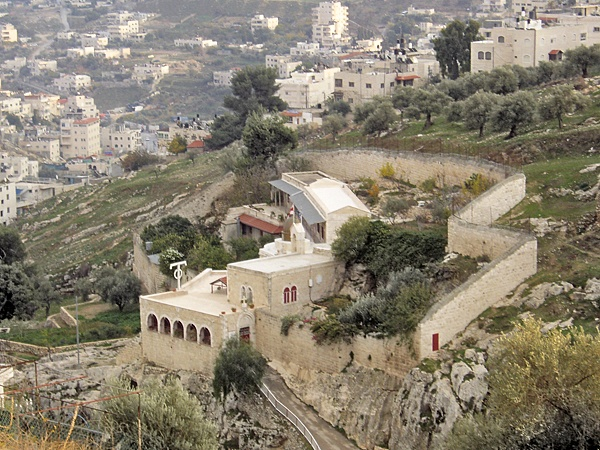
Aceldama: St. Onuphrius Monastery.

Akeldama (Greek: Ἁκελδαμά or Ἁκελδαμάχ, Aramaic: ܚܩܠ ܕܡܐ Ḥəqal dəmā, "field of blood"; Hebrew: חֲקֵל דָּמָא ; Arabic: حقل الدم, Ḥaqel Ad-dam) is the Aramaic name for a place in Jerusalem associated with Judas Iscariot, one of the original twelve apostles of Jesus.

== Variant transliterations ==
Most English-language versions of the Bible transliterate the term as Akeldama (e.g. American Standard Version (ASV), English Standard Version (ESV), Good News Translation (GNT), Modern English Version (MEV), and New International Version (NIV)) or as Akel Dama (New King James Version (NKJV) and 1599 Geneva Bible). Aceldama is used by the King James Version (KJV), Darby Bible and Wycliffe Bible. Hakeldama is used by the Common English Bible (CEB), New Revised Standard Version (NRSV) and Orthodox Jewish Bible (OJB), whilst the Complete Jewish Bible (CJB) uses Hakel-D'ma. The Jerusalem Bible has Hakeldama but uses the English translation Bloody Acre in place of Field of Blood, which is otherwise consistently used as the English translation. In Greek, it is called Ἁκελδαμάχ (Hakeldamach).

== New Testament connection ==
Christian tradition connects the place with Judas Iscariot, who betrayed Jesus for thirty pieces of silver by kissing him. There are two accounts of his death.

The Gospel of Matthew describes how Judas returned the money to the Temple authorities before hanging himself. Deeming it as blood money, and therefore illegal to put into their treasury, they used it instead to buy a field as a burial ground for foreigners: thus the place gained the name "the Field of Blood" (Matthew 27:7, and possibly with allusions to Zechariah 11:12–13 and Jeremiah 18:2–3 and Jeremiah 32:6–15).

According to the Acts of the Apostles (Acts 1:18–19) Judas "acquired a field with the reward of his unjust deed, and falling headfirst he burst open in the middle and all his intestines gushed out. This became known to all who lived in Jerusalem, so that in their own language they called that field Hakeldama, that is, 'Field of Blood.'"

The implication in Matthew is that the location name refers to the blood of Jesus, whereas in Acts the name refers to the blood of Judas. Barnabas Lindars holds the Acts narrative to be prior, and that although the incident is not created out of the Old Testament passages the text of Zechariah 11:12ff is "freely used to fill up the gaps in the story ... to the early Christian exegetes a perfectly legitimate hermeneutical procedure".

According to Ian Howard Marshall, Acts may be recording the (inaccurate) story as told within Jerusalem.

=== Identification ===
In his Onomasticon (ed. Klostermann, p. 102, 16), Eusebius says the "field of Haceldama" lies nearer to "Thafeth of the Valley of Ennom". But under the word "Haceldama" (p. 38, 20) he says that this field was pointed out as being "north of Mount Sion". St. Jerome changed this to "south of Mount Sion" (p. 39, 27).

== History ==
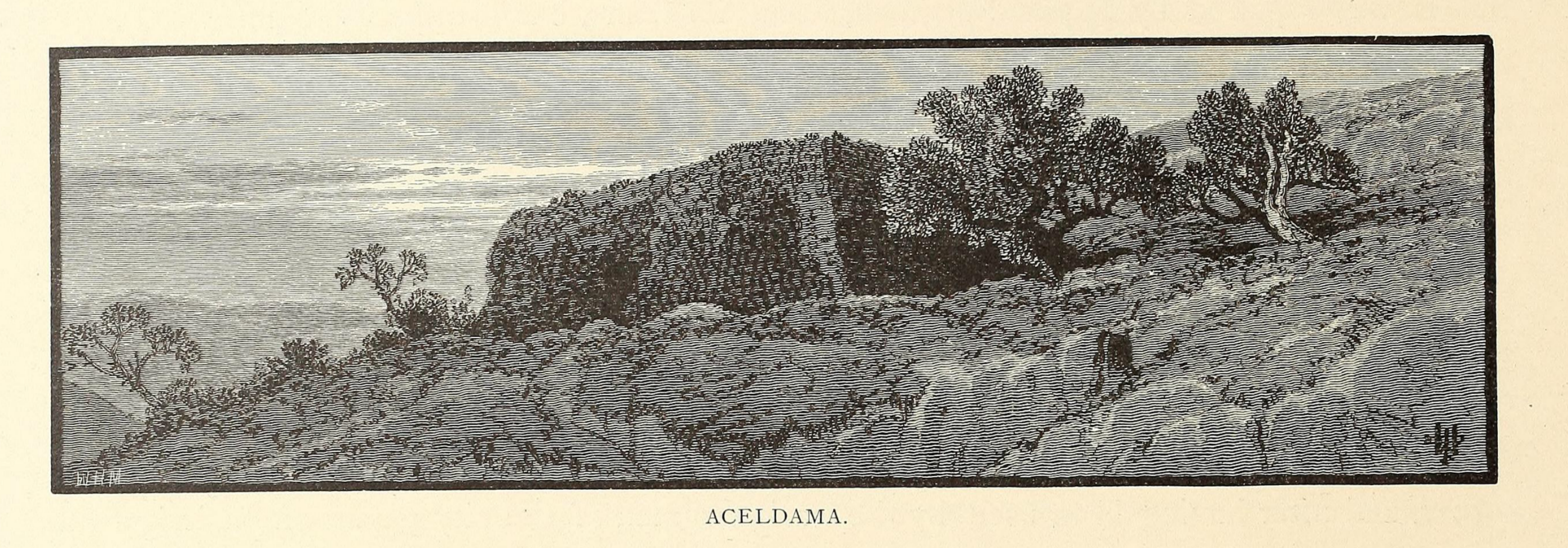
The monastery at Aceldama in the 1870s, from Picturesque Palestine

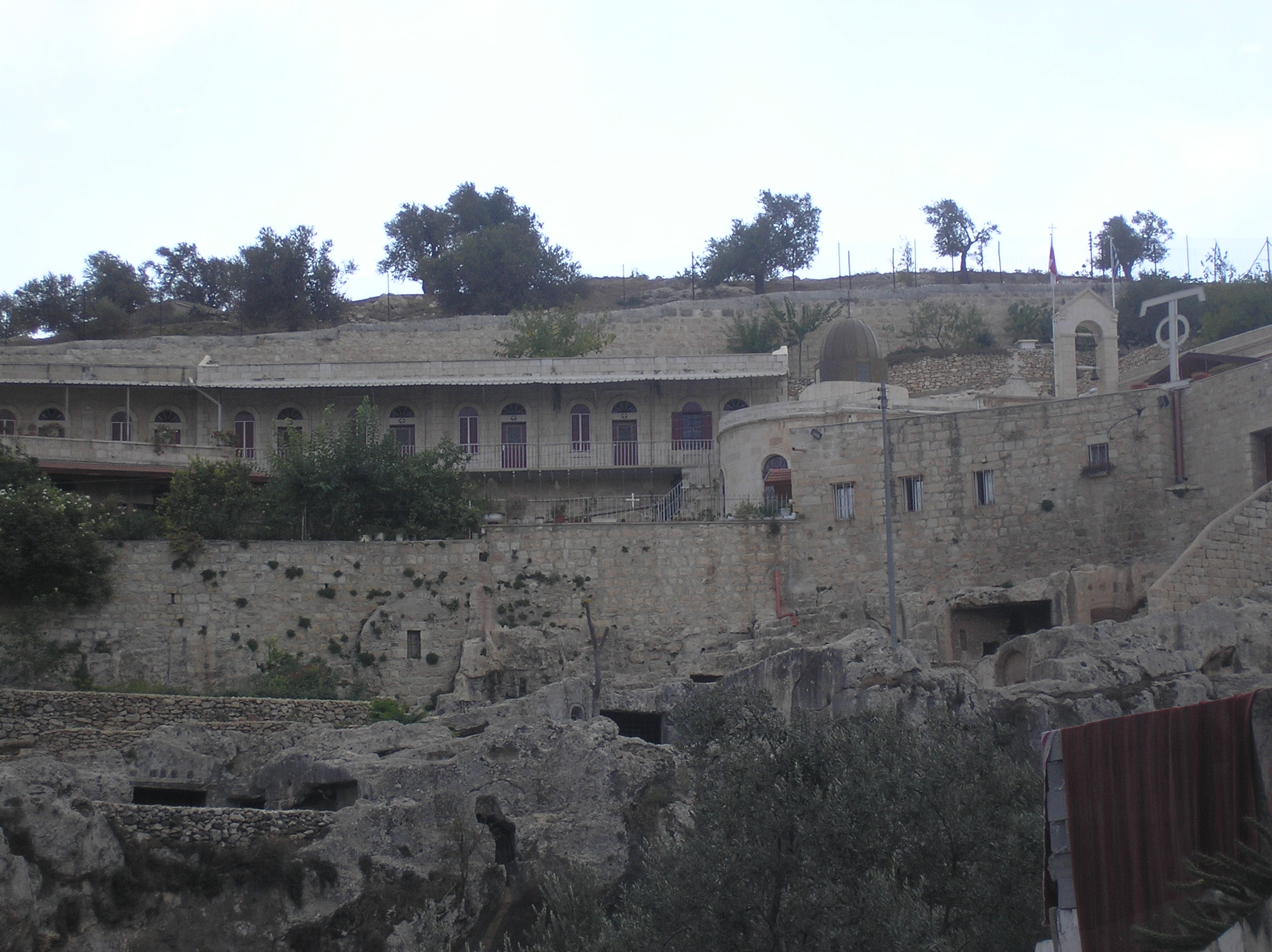
The monastery at Akeldama.

It continued to be used as a burial place for non-Jews up to the early 19th century.

=== Crusader period ===
During the era of the Crusades, it was used to bury the fifty or more patients who died each day in the hospital run by the Knights Hospitaller in Jerusalem.

In the 12th century, the crusaders erected beyond the field, on the south side of the valley of Hinnom, a large building now in a ruined condition, measuring seventy-eight feet in length from east to west, fifty-eight feet in width and thirty in height on the north. It is roofed and covers towards the southern end several natural grottoes, which were once used as sepulchres of the Jewish type, and a ditch is hollowed out at the northern end which is sixty-eight feet long, twenty-one feet wide and thirty feet deep. It is estimated that the bones and rubbish accumulated there form a bed from ten to fifteen feet thick.

=== Ottoman period ===
Akeldama has been the property of the Armenian Patriarchate of Jerusalem since the 16th century.

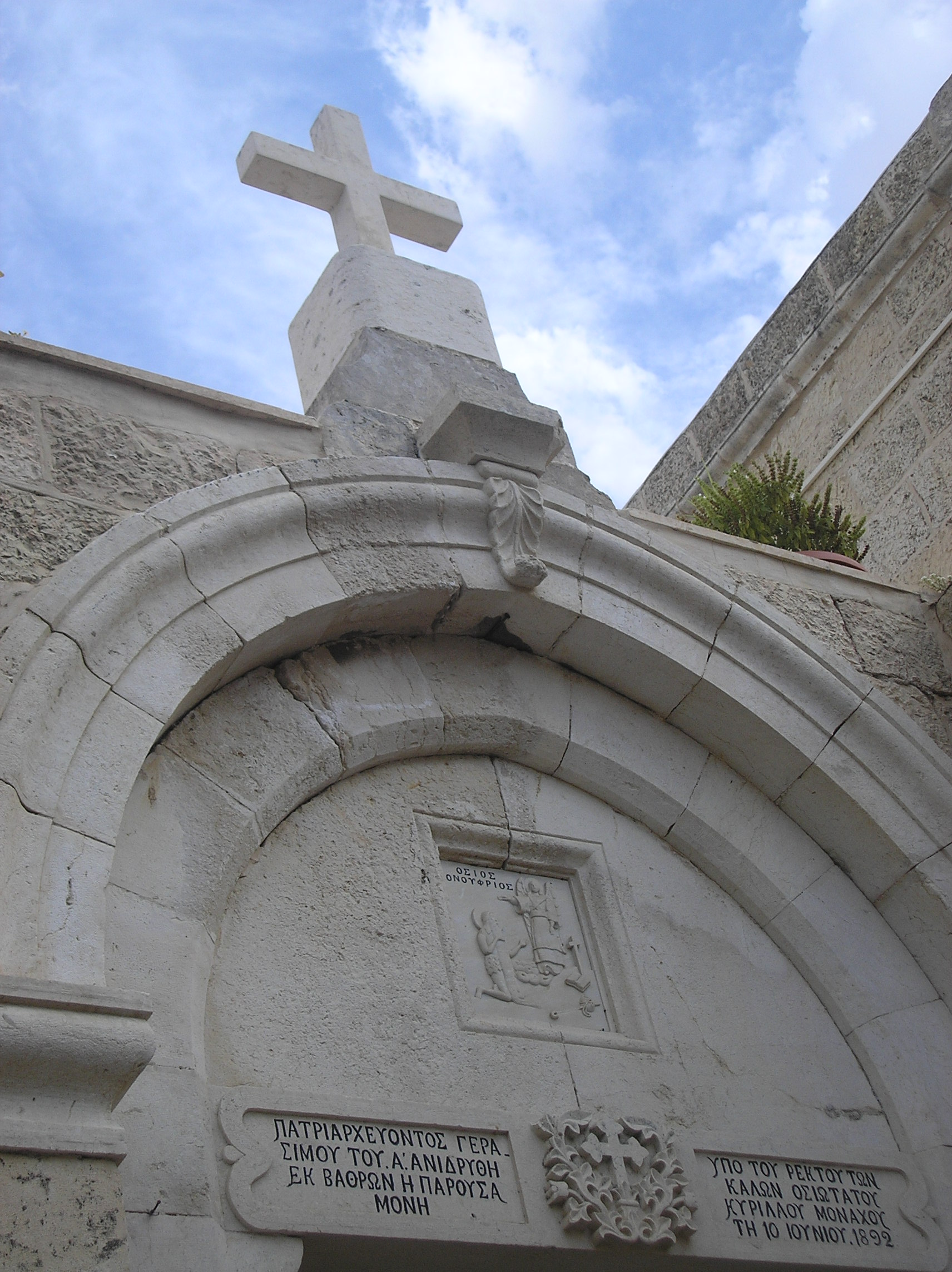
St. Onuphrius Monastery: close-up of the entrance. Above the doorway is a stone carving of St. Onuphrius bowing to an angel. Noticeable are his long beard, the fact that he is naked except for leaves around his loins and his legs.

In 1892 the Greek Orthodox Church built a monastery at the site, named after Saint Onuphrius. Many burial caves have been identified in and around the monastery.

== The Akeldama tombs ==
One of Jerusalem's main cemeteries during the Second Temple period is a burial complex carved into dense limestone bedrock of a steep slope descending into the meeting point of the Hinnom and Kidron Valleys, 90 meters east of the monastery wall. They were first systematically studied in 1901. In 1989 a construction project was halted when bulldozers revealed the presence of burial caves cut into the rocks; construction was halted, and the Israel Antiquities Authority allowed archaeologists to investigate.

The Tomb of the Shroud in Akeldama is "one of very few examples of a preserved shrouded human burial" dating to the first century, with the bone samples yielding evidence of the pathogens Mycobacterium tuberculosis and Mycobacterium leprae, the latter being "the earliest case of leprosy with a confirmed date in which M. leprae DNA was detected".

== See also ==
- Language of Jesus
- St. Onuphrius Monastery
