= Brian D'Onofrio =

American psychologist

- Born: Brian Matthew D'Onofrio
- Education: University of Virginia; Virginia Commonwealth University
- Awards: Janet Taylor Spence Award for Transformative Early Career Contributions from the Association for Psychological Science (2013)
- Scientific career
- Fields: Developmental psychopathology
- Institutions: Indiana University
- Thesis: Causation versus selection: A genetically informed study of marital instability and its consequences for young-adult offspring (2005)
- Doctoral advisor: Eric Turkheimer

Brian M. D'Onofrio is an American psychologist who researches the causes of psychopathology in children and adolescents. Much of his work is influenced by the field of behavior genetics. He is a professor in the Department of Psychological and Brain Sciences at Indiana University, where he is also Director of Clinical Training in the Clinical Science Program and Principal Investigator of the Developmental Psychopathology Lab. His research on the relationship between paternal age and children's risk of mental illness has been widely covered in the media. In 2013, he received the Spence Award for Transformational Early Career Contribution from the Association for Psychological Science (APS). In the same year, he was also named a fellow of the APS, and was named one of its "rising stars".
