= Peter the Athonite =

7th century hermit of Mount Athos

Saint Peter the Athonite
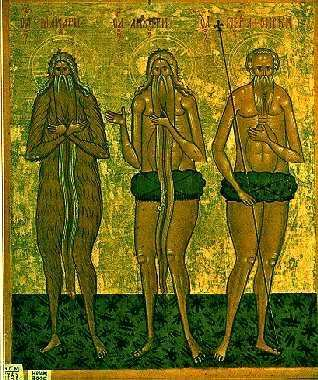
- Icon of Onuphrius, Macarius of Egypt, and Peter of Athos (Menologion of Basil II)

Hermit
- Born: Around 9th century Byzantium
- Died: 9th century Mount Athos
- Venerated in: Eastern Orthodox Church, Eastern Catholic Churches, Roman Catholic Church
- Feast: June 12 (Eastern Orthodox and Roman Catholic)
- Attributes: Monastic garb, cave
- Patronage: Mount Athos

Peter the Athonite (d. 9th century), sometimes called Peter of Mount Athos, is reputed to have been the first hermit to settle upon the Mount Athos. He is venerated as a saint and commemorated by the Eastern Orthodox, Eastern Catholic and Roman Catholic Churches on June 12.

== Biography ==
Peter the Athonite is primarily known through hagiographical traditions. According to these accounts, he was a soldier who was captured during a war with the Syrians and imprisoned in a fortress in the city of Samara, on the Euphrates River. He was reportedly freed through miraculous intervention while in captivity, with Saint Nicholas and Saint Simeon the Righteous appearing to assist in his escape from a Muslim prison. In gratitude, he travelled to Constantinople (New Rome) to fulfil a vow to become a monk, where he reportedly received the monastic habit directly from the Pope, who also instructed him in ascetic discipline.

Following a vision of the Blessed Virgin and Theotokos, Peter journeyed to Mount Athos, where he lived as a hermit in a cave for nearly fifty years. According to tradition, he was once discovered by a hunter, who described him as a naked man covered with hair and bearing a long beard. Peter reportedly instructed the hunter to pray for a year and not to speak of their meeting. When the hunter returned a year later with his demon-afflicted brother and other companions, they found that Peter had died. The afflicted man touched the saint's body and was said to be miraculously healed.

After his repose, his relics were discovered by a hunter and taken to the Monastery of Clement, a formerly existing monastery that is now occupied by the Monastery of Iviron.

== Legacy ==
Some sources place his life in the 7th and 8th centuries, others situate him in the 9th century.

A hagiography devoted to Saint Peter the Athonite was written at Hilandar by Genadius the Athonite.

A vita (BHG 1505) of Peter the Athonite was also written by an Athonite monk named Nicholas sometime around the late 10th or early 11th century. It was translated into Italian in 1999.

== See also ==
- Silouan the Athonite

== Sources ==
- Dimitri E. Conomos; Graham Speake (1 January 2005). Mount Athos, the Sacred Bridge: The Spirituality of the Holy Mountain. Peter Lang. pp. 69–. ISBN 978-3-03910-064-4.
- Venerable Peter of Mt. Athos. OCA - Feasts and Saints.
- St. Peter of Mount Athos. Catholic Online.
