= Lorenzo Onofrio Colonna =

Lorenzo Onofrio Colonna may refer to:

- Lorenzo Onofrio Colonna, Count of the Marsi (1356–1423), grandfather of Giovanni Colonna (cardinal, 1456–1508)
- Lorenzo Onofrio Colonna, 8th Prince of Paliano (1637–1689)
- Lorenzo Onofrio Colonna, 11th Prince of Paliano (1723–1779), Prince of Paliano
