= Giovanni Bonsi (painter) =

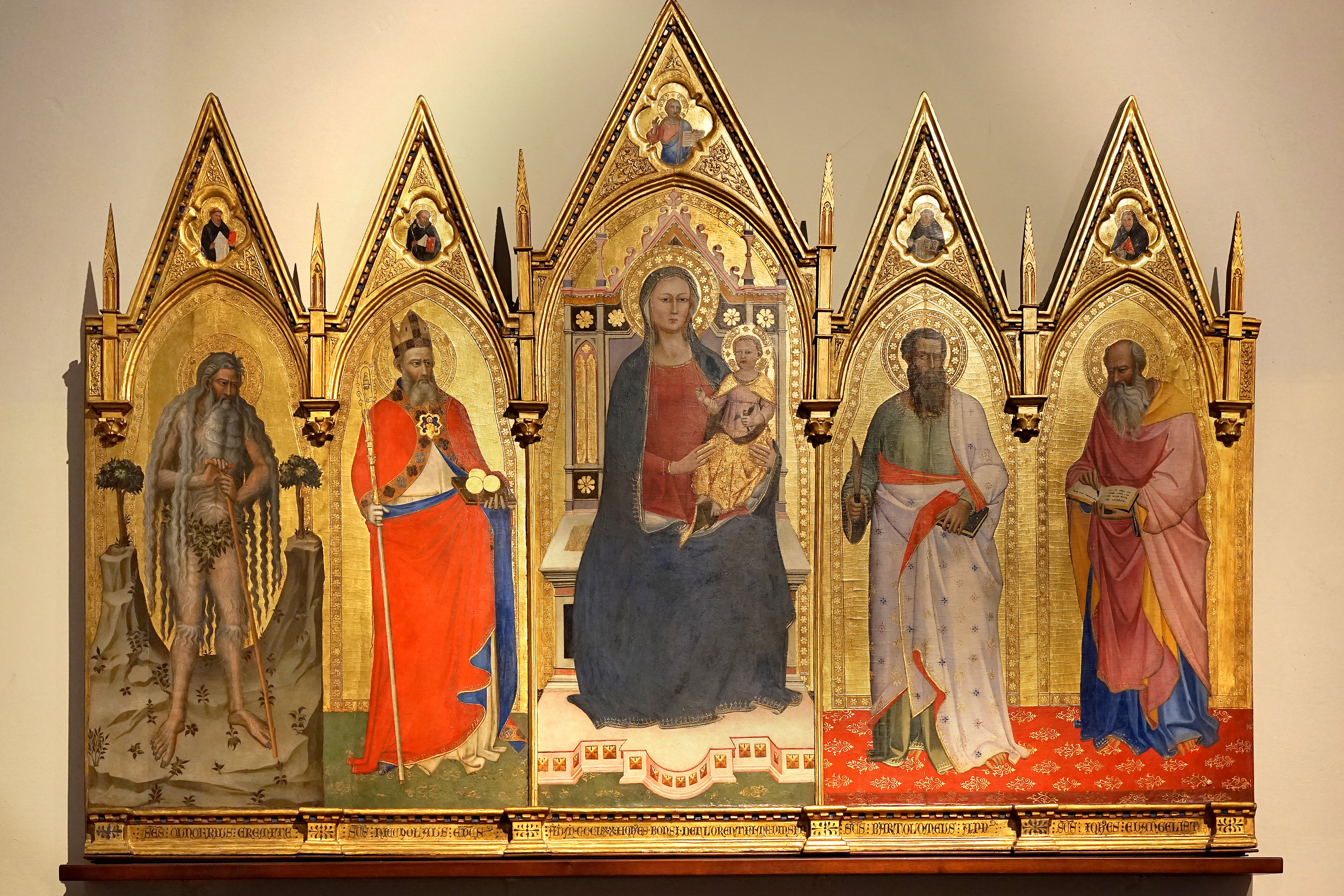
Polyptych from the Pinacoteca Vaticana

Giovanni Bonsi (fl. 1351–1371) was a Florentine painter.

In the Libro della Sega, the surviving tax register for 1351–1352, Bonsi's liability places him among the richest hundred persons in his quarter. He appears in the tax registers of 1354 and 1361–1362 alongside his artistic partner, Neri di Mone. In 1366, with the painters Orcagna and Andrea di Bonaiuto, he was appointed to a committee charged with making proposals for the construction of the new cathedral of Florence. He is absent from the tax register of 1376 and it is generally assumed that he had died in the interim.

Bonsi was long neglected in studies of Florentine painting and considered a minor follower of Orcagna. Federico Zeri first drew attention to the quality of his work and its anticipation of International Gothic in 1964. At the time, he was known for a single painting in the Pinacoteca Vaticana, dated 1371. Zeri identified a triptych, now divided between museums in Denver and San Diego, and a tabernacle by Bonsi. At least two other panel paintings have been assigned to him.
