= Return of Jesus to Galilee =

Episode in the life of Jesus

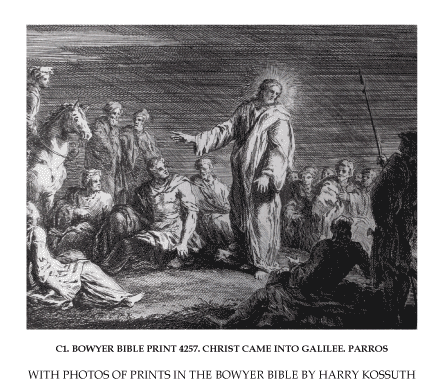
Return of Jesus to Galilee depicted in the Bowyer Bible, 19th century.

The Return of Jesus to Galilee is an episode in the life of Jesus which appears in three of the Canonical Gospels: Matthew 4:12, Mark 1:14 and John 4:1–3, 4:43–45. It relates the return of Jesus to Galilee upon the imprisonment of John the Baptist.

== Gospel of John ==
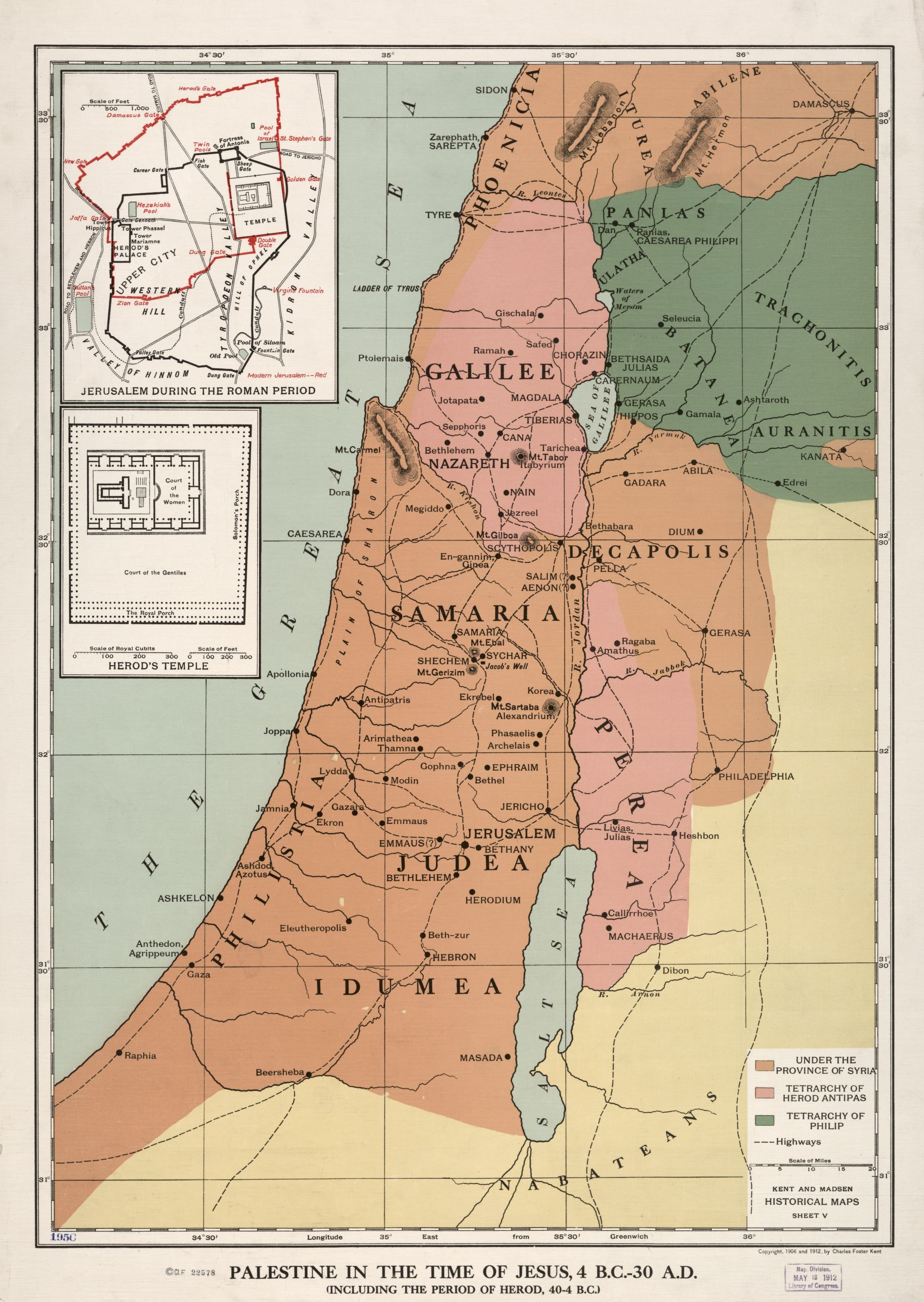
Map of Judea, Samaria and Galilee at Jesus's time.

According to the Gospel of John:

The Pharisees heard that Jesus was gaining and baptizing more disciples than John, although in fact it was not Jesus who baptized, but his disciples. When the Lord learned of this, he left Judea and went back once more to Galilee.

John's Gospel narrative refers to Jesus travelling through Samaria in order to reach Galilee, and describes his meeting with a Samaritan woman at a well at Sychar in Samaria.

== Gospel of Mark ==
In Mark's Gospel, Jesus returns to Galilee from the desert after John's arrest, following a period of solitude and temptation.

== Gospel of Matthew ==
In Matthew's Gospel, the narrative suggests that after his baptism he had spent time in the desert, the "holy city" (Jerusalem) and a mountainous area before returning to Galilee. He left Nazareth, where he had grown up, and dwelt in Capernaum, which is by the Sea of Galilee "in the heart of the world, in a busy town, and near others, on the shore of a sea that was full of fish, and on a great international highway".

== Galilean ministry ==
Jesus's return to Galilee marks the beginning of his "public ministry" in Galilee, as he begins to preach there, and in Matthew's interpretation, the fulfillment of the prophecy of Isaiah (Isaiah 9):

The land of Zebulun and the land of Naphtali, By the way of the sea, beyond the Jordan, Galilee of the Gentiles: The people who sat in darkness have seen a great light, And upon those who sat in the region and shadow of death, Light has dawned.”

Return of Jesus to Galilee Life of Jesus: Ministry
Preceded by Temptation of Jesus	New Testament; Events	Succeeded by Calling of the disciples
