= Religious ministry =

Religious ministry may refer to:

- Minister (Christianity)
- Christian ministry, activity by Christians to spread or express their faith
- Ministry of Jesus
