= Vocation of the Apostles =

Fresco by Domenico Ghirlandaio in the Sistine Chapel

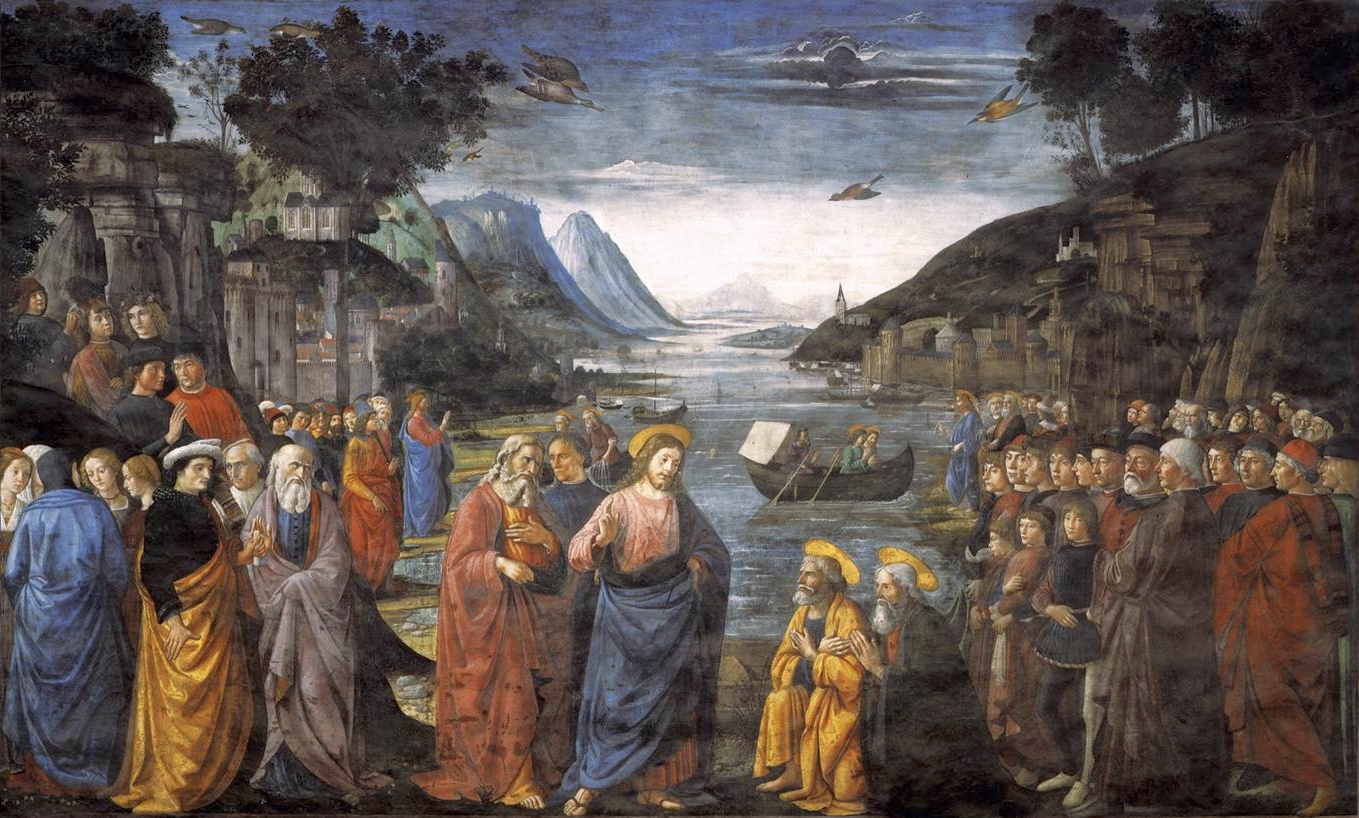
- Artist: Domenico Ghirlandaio and workshop
- Year: 1481–1482
- Type: Fresco
- Dimensions: 349 cm × 570 cm (137 in × 220 in)
- Location: Sistine Chapel; Rome

The Vocation of the Apostles is a fresco by the Italian Renaissance painter Domenico Ghirlandaio, executed in 1481–1482 and located in the Sistine Chapel, Rome. It depicts the Gospel narrative of Jesus Christ calling Peter and Andrew to become his disciples.

== History ==
In 1481 a group of Florentine painters left for Rome, where they had been called as part of the reconciliation project between Lorenzo de' Medici, the de facto ruler of Florence, and Pope Sixtus IV. The Florentines started to work in the Sistine Chapel as early as mid-1481, along with Pietro Perugino, who was already there.

The theme of the decoration was a parallel between the Stories of Moses and those of Christ, as a sign of continuity between the Old and the New Testament. A continuity also between the divine law of the Tables and the message of Jesus, who, in turn, chose Peter (the first alleged bishop of Rome) as his successor: this would finally result in a legitimation of the latter's successors, the popes of Rome.

Two frescoes are certainly by Ghirlandaio, the Vocation of the Apostles and the Resurrection, which was repainted in the late 16th century due to extensive damage. A third, The Crossing of the Red Sea, in the "Stories of Moses" wall, has been assigned to one among Ghirlandaio, Biagio d'Antonio or Cosimo Rosselli.

== Description ==
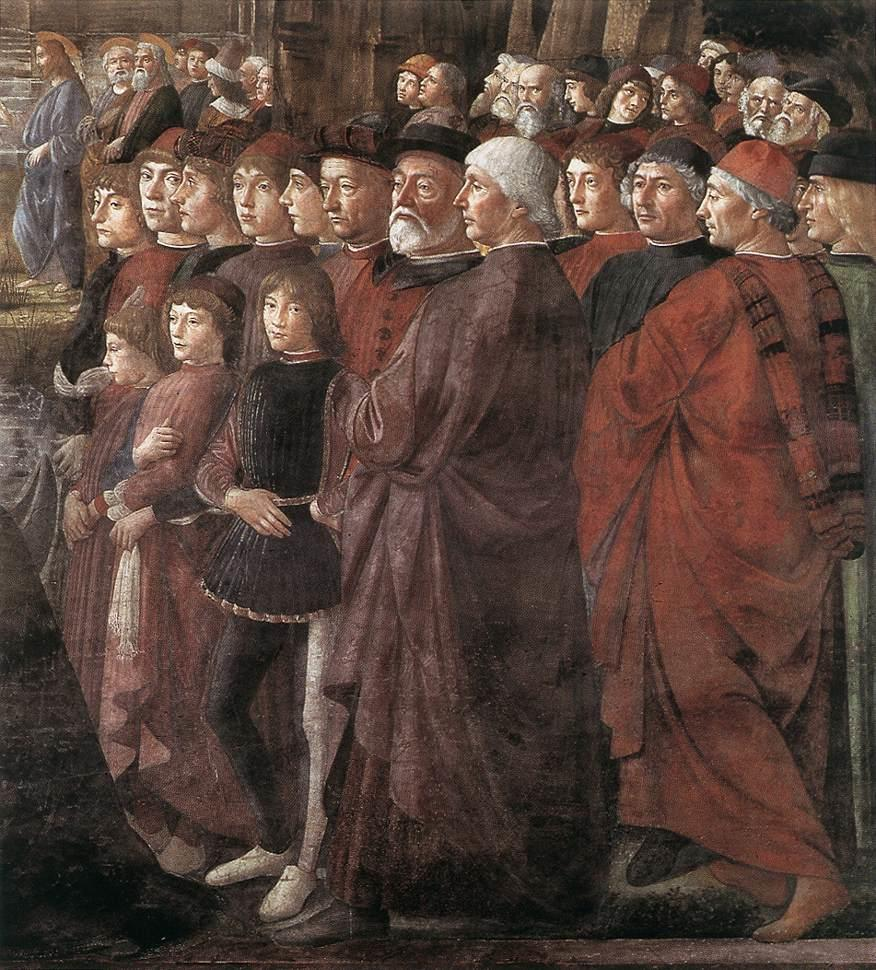
Detail of the characters on the right, with John Argyropoulos in the center

In the background left, the fishermen Peter and Andrew are called by Jesus. The two can also be seen in the background right, behind Jesus, who calls James and John, who are restoring the nets on their father Zebedee's boat.

In the foreground are Peter and Andrew, dressed in cloaks with their traditional colors (yellow-orange for Peter and green for Andrew). They are kneeling beside Christ, who blesses them. A unique element of the fresco is the inclusion of a multitude portrayed in contemporary clothes. Their faces were those of the Florentine community in Rome, who resided near the church of Santa Maria sopra Minerva.

At the left is a white bearded man, perhaps a literate from Constantinople who was also used as a model for St. Jerome in His Study in the church of Ognissanti in Florence. At the center, just behind Jesus, is the portrait of Diotisalvi Neroni, who had taken refuge in Rome after plotting against Piero di Cosimo de' Medici. Another exile from Constantinople is John Argyropoulos, who appears on the right. Other characters on the right are members of the Tornabuoni family.

== See also ==
- Commissioning of the Twelve Apostles
