= Commissioning of the Twelve Apostles =

Episode in the ministry of Jesus

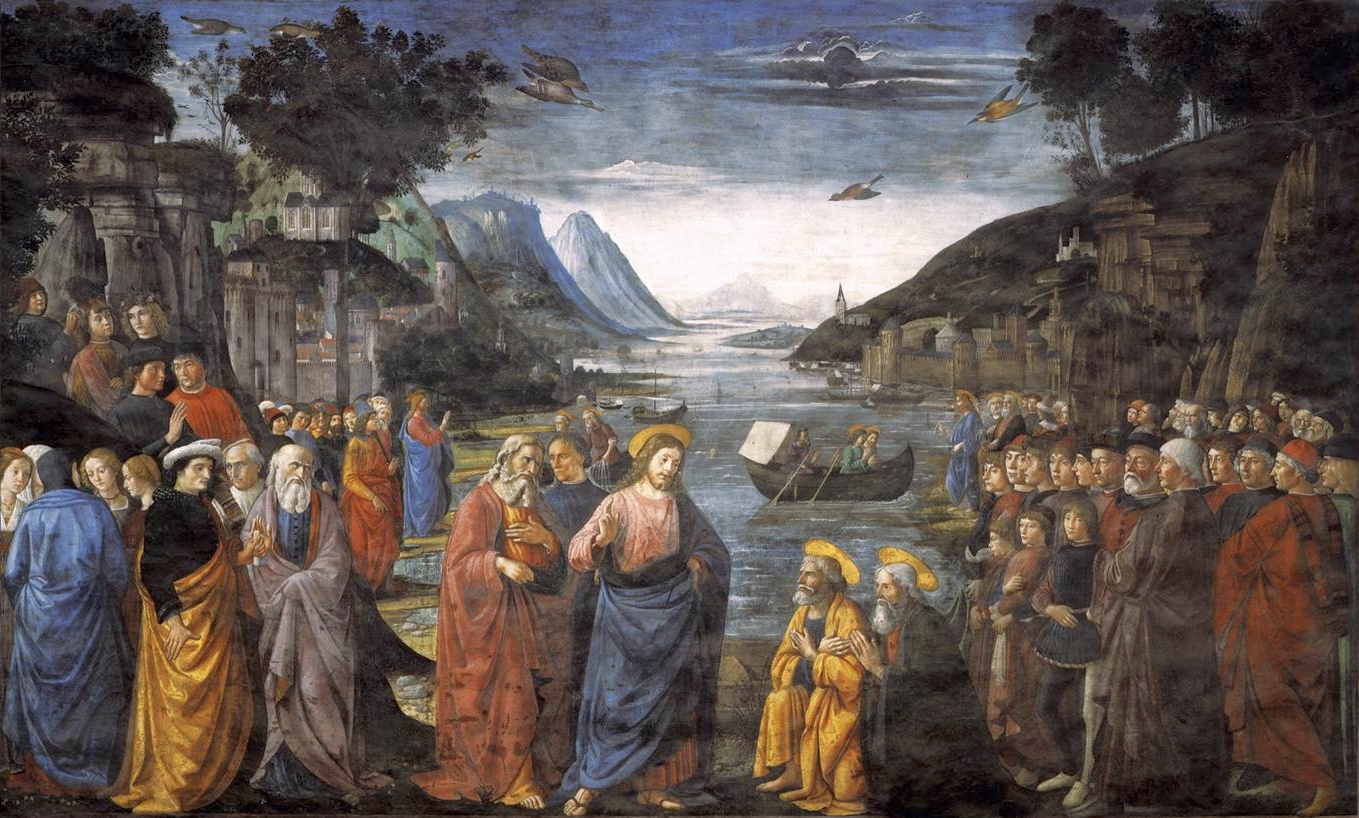
Vocation of the Apostles, a fresco in the Sistine Chapel by Domenico Ghirlandaio, 1481-82

The commissioning of the Twelve Apostles is an episode in the ministry of Jesus that appears in all three Synoptic Gospels: Matthew 10:1–4, Mark 3:13–19 and Luke 6:12–16. It relates the initial selection of the Twelve Apostles among the disciples of Jesus.

== Biblical accounts ==
According to Mark:

He went up the mountain and called to him those whom he wanted, and they came to him. And he appointed twelve to be with him and to be sent out to preach and to have authority to cast out demons. So he appointed the twelve: Simon (to whom he gave the name Peter), James son of Zebedee and John the brother of James (to whom he gave the name Boanerges, that is, Sons of Thunder), and Andrew, and Philip, and Bartholomew, and Matthew, and Thomas, and James son of Alphaeus, and Thaddaeus, and Simon the Cananaean, and Judas Iscariot, who handed him over.

According to Matthew:

Then Jesus summoned his twelve disciples and gave them authority over unclean spirits, to cast them out, and to cure every disease and every sickness. These are the names of the twelve apostles: first, Simon, also known as Peter, and his brother Andrew; James son of Zebedee and his brother John; Philip and Bartholomew; Thomas and Matthew the tax collector; James son of Alphaeus and Thaddaeus; Simon the Cananaean and Judas Iscariot, the one who betrayed him.

According to Luke:

Now during those days he went out to the mountain to pray, and he spent the night in prayer to God. And when day came, he called his disciples and chose twelve of them, whom he also named apostles: Simon, whom he named Peter, and his brother Andrew, and James, and John, and Philip, and Bartholomew, and Matthew, and Thomas, and James son of Alphaeus, and Simon, who was called the Zealot, and Judas son of James, and Judas Iscariot, who became a traitor.

== Commentary ==
In the Gospel of Matthew, this episode takes place shortly before the miracle of the man with a withered hand. In the Gospel of Mark and Gospel of Luke it appears shortly after that miracle.

This commissioning of the apostles takes place before the crucifixion of Jesus, while the Great Commission in Matthew 28:16–20 takes place after his resurrection.

St. Jerome comments on this passage saying, "A kind and merciful Lord and Master does not envy His servants and disciples a share in His powers. As Himself had cured every sickness and disease, He imparted the same power to His Apostles. But there is a wide difference between having and imparting, between giving and receiving. Whatever He does He does with the power of a master, whatever they do it is with confession of their own weakness, as they speak, In the name of Jesus rise and walk. (Acts 3:6.) A catalogue of the names of the Apostles is given, that all false Apostles might be excluded. The names of the twelve Apostles are these; First, Simon who is called Peter, and Andrew his brother. To arrange them in order according to their merit is His alone who searches the secrets of all hearts. But Simon is placed first, having the surname of Peter given to distinguish him from the other Simon surnamed Chananæus, from the village of Chana in Galilee where the Lord turned the water into wine."

== See also ==
- Calling of Matthew
- Dispersion of the Apostles
- First disciples of Jesus
- Gospel harmony
- The Great Commission
- Life of Jesus in the New Testament
- Matthew 10, Mark 3, Luke 6

Commissioning of the Twelve Apostles Life of Jesus: Ministry Events
Preceded by New Wine into Old Wineskins	New Testament; Events	Succeeded by Beatitudes in the Sermon on the Mount/Plain
