= Temptation of Christ =

Biblical narrative in the gospels

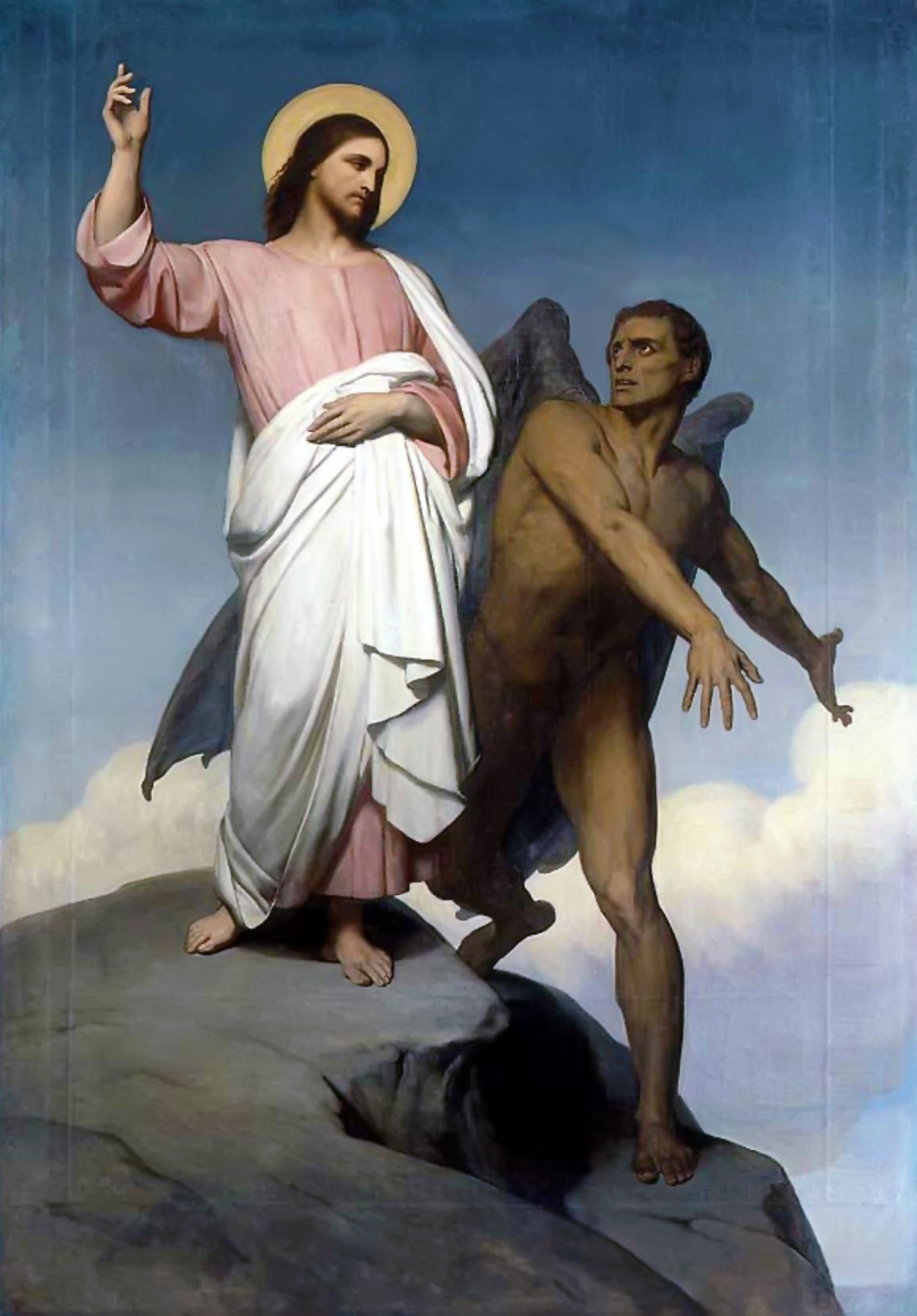
Jesus and the Devil depicted in The Temptation of Christ, by Ary Scheffer, 1854

The temptation of Christ is a biblical narrative detailed in the gospels of Matthew, Mark, and Luke. After being baptized by John the Baptist, Jesus was tempted by the devil after 40 days and nights of fasting in the Judaean Desert. At the time, Satan came to Jesus and tried to tempt him. With Jesus refusing each temptation, Satan then departed and Jesus returned to Galilee to begin his ministry.

The writer of the Epistle to the Hebrews also refers to Jesus having been tempted "in every way that we are, except without sin". Mark's account is very brief, merely noting the event. Matthew and Luke describe the temptations by recounting the details of the conversations between Jesus and Satan. The temptation of Christ is not explicitly mentioned in the Gospel of John but in this gospel Jesus does refer to the Devil, "the prince of this world", having no power over him. In church calendars of many Christian denominations, Jesus' forty day period of fasting in the Judaean Desert is remembered during the season of Lent, during which many Christians fast, pray and give alms to the poor.

== Literary genre ==
=== Discussion of status as a parable ===
Discussion of the literary genre includes whether what is represented is a history, a parable, a myth, or compound of various genres. This relates to the reality of the encounter. Sometimes the temptation narrative is taken as a parable, reading that Jesus in his ministry told this narrative to audiences relating his inner experience in the form of a parable. Or it is autobiographical, regarding what sort of Messiah Jesus intended to be. Writers including William Barclay have pointed to the fact that there is "no mountain high enough in all the world to see the whole world" as indication of the non-literal nature of the event, and that the narrative portrays what was going on inside Jesus' mind. Dominican theologian Thomas Aquinas explained, "In regard to the words, 'He showed Him all the kingdoms of the world, and the glory of them,' we are not to understand that He saw the very kingdoms, with the cities and inhabitants, their gold and silver: but that the devil pointed out the quarters in which each kingdom or city lay, and set forth to Him in words their glory and estate."

The debate on the literality of the temptations goes back at least to the 18th-century discussion of George Benson and Hugh Farmer.

The Catholic understanding is that the temptation of Christ was a literal and physical event. "Despite the difficulties urged, …against the historical character of the three temptations of Jesus, as recorded by St. Matthew and St. Luke, it is plain that these sacred writers intended to describe an actual and visible approach of Satan, to chronicle an actual shifting of places, etc., and that the traditional view, which maintains the objective nature of Christ's temptations, is the only one meeting all the requirements of the Gospel narrative."

The Catechism of the Catholic Church states:

The Gospels speak of a time of solitude for Jesus in the desert immediately after his baptism by John. Driven by the Spirit into the desert, Jesus remains there for forty days without eating; he lives among wild beasts, and angels minister to him. At the end of this time Satan tempts him three times, seeking to compromise his filial attitude toward God. Jesus rebuffs these attacks, which recapitulate the temptations of Adam in Paradise and of Israel in the desert, and the devil leaves him "until an opportune time…" The temptation in the desert shows Jesus, the humble Messiah, who triumphs over Satan by his total adherence to the plan of salvation willed by the Father.

=== Use of Old Testament references ===
The account of Matthew uses language from the Old Testament. The imagery would be familiar to Matthew's contemporary readers. In the Septuagint Greek version of Zechariah 3 the name Iesous and term diabolos are identical to the Greek terms of Matthew 4. Matthew presents the three scriptural passages cited by Jesus (Deut 8:3, Deut 6:13, and Deut 6:16) not in their order in the Book of Deuteronomy, but in the sequence of the trials of Israel as they wandered in the desert, as recorded in the Book of Exodus. Luke's account is similar, though his inversion of the second and third temptations "represents a more natural geographic movement, from the wilderness to the temple". Luke's closing statement that the devil "departed from him until an opportune time" may provide a narrative link to the immediately following attempt at Nazareth to throw Jesus down from a high place, or may anticipate a role for Satan in the Passion (cf. Luke 22:3).

== Matthew and Luke narratives ==
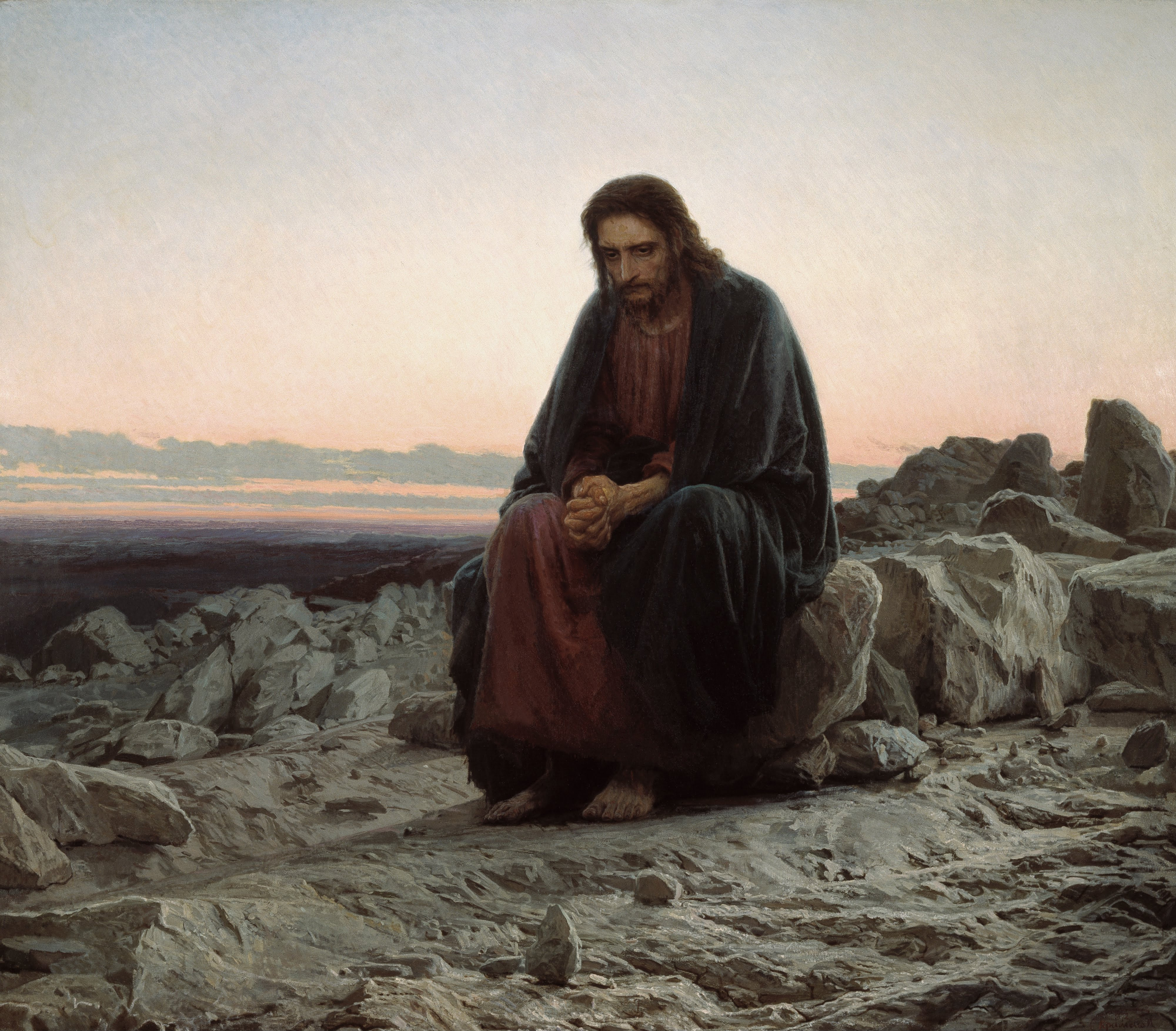
Christ in the Wilderness by Ivan Kramskoy, 1872

Fasting traditionally presaged a great spiritual struggle. Elijah and Moses in the Old Testament fasted 40 days and nights, and thus Jesus doing the same invites comparison to these events. In Judaism, "the practice of fasting connected the body and its physical needs with less tangible values, such as self-denial and repentance." At that time, 40 was less a specific numeral and more a general expression for any large number. Fasting may not mean a complete abstinence from food; consequently, Jesus may have been surviving on the sparse food that could be obtained in the desert. On the other hand, the synoptic gospel of Luke specifies that "He ate nothing" which, based on the plain reading of the text, suggests complete abstinence of food.

Mark does not provide details, but in Matthew and Luke "the tempter" (Greek: ὁ πειράζων, ho peirazōn) or "the devil" (Greek: ὁ διάβολος, ho diabolos) tempts Jesus to:

- Make bread out of stones to relieve his own hunger
- Jump from a pinnacle and rely on angels to break his fall. The narratives of both Luke and Matthew have Satan quote Psalm 91:11–12 to indicate that God had promised this assistance.
- Worship the tempter in return for all the kingdoms of the world.

== The Temptations ==
=== Stones to bread ===
The temptation of bread out of stones occurs in the same desert setting where Jesus had been fasting, with a spot on Mount Quarantania traditionally being considered the exact location. The desert was seen as outside the bounds of society and as the home of demons such as Azazel (Leviticus 16:10). Robert H. Gundry states that the desert is likely an allusion to the wilderness through which the Israelites wandered during the Exodus, and more specifically to Moses. Jesus' struggle against hunger in the face of Satan points to his representative role of the Israelites, but he does not fail God in his urge for hunger. This temptation may have been Jesus' last, aiming towards his hunger.

In response to Satan's suggestion, Jesus replies, "It is written: Man does not live on bread alone, but on every word that proceeds from the mouth of God" (a reference to Deuteronomy 8:3). Only in Matthew's gospel is this entire sentence written.

=== Pinnacle of the temple ===
This is the second temptation mentioned in Matthew and the third temptation listed in Luke.

Most Christians consider that holy city refers undoubtedly to Jerusalem and the temple to which the pinnacle belongs is thus identified as the Temple in Jerusalem. Gospel of Matthew refers to "the temple" 17 times without ever adding "in Jerusalem". That Luke's version of the story clearly identifies the location as Jerusalem may be due to Theophilus' unfamiliarity with Judaism.

Temptations of Christ (Melisende Psalter, 1131-1143, folio f.4r)

What is meant by the word traditionally translated as pinnacle is not entirely clear since the Greek diminutive form pterugion ("little wing") is not extant in other architectural contexts. Though the form pterux ("large wing") is used for the point of a building by Pollianus, Schweizer feels that little tower or parapet would be more accurate, and the New Jerusalem Bible does use the translation "parapet". The only surviving Jewish parallel to the temptation uses the standard word šbyt "roof" not "wing": "Our Rabbis related that in the hour when the Messiah shall be revealed he shall come and stand on the roof (šbyt) of the temple." (Peshiqta Rabbati 62 c–d) The term is preserved as "wing" in Syriac translations of the Greek.

Gundry lists three sites at the Jerusalem temple that would fit this description:

- On the top of the temple's main tower, above the sanctuary proper, some 180 feet above ground, the location that artists and others using the traditional translation generally set the story.
- Atop the lintel of the main gateway into the temple, the most prominent position where the pair could easily have been seen.
- A tower on the southeast corner of the outer wall that looks down into the Kidron Valley. In later Christian tradition this is the tower from which James the brother of Jesus was said by Hegesippus to have been thrown by way of execution.

"If thou be the Son of God, cast thyself down from hence: For it is written, 'He shall give his angels charge over thee, to keep thee: And in their hands they shall bear thee up, lest at any time thou dash thy foot against a stone.'" (Luke 4:9–11) citing Psalms 91:12.

Once more, Jesus maintained his integrity and responded by quoting scripture, saying, "It is said, Thou shalt not tempt the Lord thy God.'" (Matthew 4:7) quoting Deuteronomy 6:16.

=== Mountain ===
For the third and final temptation in Matthew (presented as the second temptation of the three in Luke) the devil takes Jesus to a high place, which Matthew explicitly identifies as a very high mountain, where all the kingdoms of the world can be seen. The spot pointed out by tradition as the summit from which Satan offered to Jesus dominion over all earthly kingdoms is the "Quarantania", a limestone peak on the road from Jerusalem to Jericho.

Instead of a literal reading, George Slatyer Barrett viewed the third temptation as inclining to a doubt of Christ's mission, or at least the methodology. Barrett sees this as a temptation to accept the adulation of the crowds, assume leadership of the nation to overthrow Roman rule, take the crown of his own nation, and from there initiate the kingdom of God on earth. The kingdoms Jesus would inherit through Satan are obtained through love of power and political oppression. Barrett characterizes this "the old but ever new temptation to do evil that good may come; to justify the illegitimacy of the means by the greatness of the end."

The mountain is not literal if the temptations only occur in the mind's eye of Jesus and the Gospel accounts record this mind's eye view, as related in parable form, to the disciples at some point during the ministry.

Satan says, "All these things I will give you if you fall down and do an act of worship to me." Jesus replies "Get away, Satan! It is written: 'You shall worship the Lord your God and only Him shall you serve.'" (referencing Deuteronomy 6:13 and 10:20). Readers would likely recognize this as reminiscent of the temptation to false worship that the Israelites encountered in the desert in the incident of the Golden Calf mentioned in Exodus 32:4.

=== Ministered to by angels ===
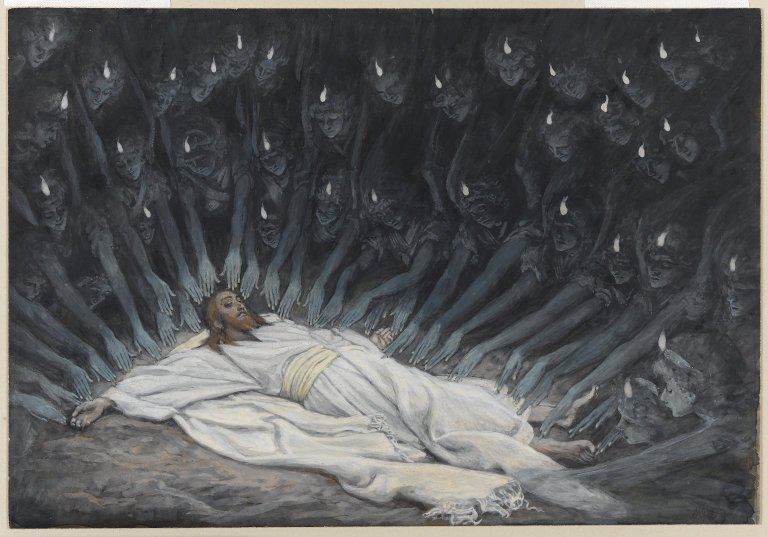
Jesus Ministered to by Angels (Jésus assisté par les anges), James Tissot, Brooklyn Museum

At this, Satan departs and Jesus is tended by angels. While both Mark and Matthew mention the angels, Luke does not, and Matthew seems once again here to be making parallels with Elijah, who was fed by ravens. The word ministered or served is often interpreted as the angels feeding Jesus, and traditionally artists have depicted the scene as Jesus being presented with a feast, a detailed description of it even appearing in Paradise Regained. This ending to the temptation narrative may be a common literary device of using a feast scene to emphasize a happy ending, or it may be proof that Jesus never lost his faith in God during the temptations.

== Gospel of Mark ==
The Mark (1:12–13) account is very brief. Most of the Mark account is found also in the Matthew and Luke versions, with the exception of the statement that Jesus was "with the wild animals." Despite the lack of actual text shared among the three texts, the language and interpretations Mark uses draw comparison among the three Gospels. The Greek verb Mark uses in the text is synonymous with driving out demons, and the wilderness at times represents a place of struggle. The two verses in Mark used to describe Jesus' Temptation quickly progress him into his career as a preacher.

Thomas Aquinas argued that Jesus allowed himself to be tempted as both an example and a warning. He cites Sirach 2: "Son, when thou comest to the service of God, stand in justice and in fear, and prepare thy soul for temptation." Following this, he cites Hebrews 4:15: "We have not a high-priest, who cannot have compassion on our infirmities, but one tempted in all things like as we are, without sin."

== Gospel of John ==
The temptation of Christ is not found in the Gospel of John. However, some readers have identified parallels inside John which indicate that the author of John may have been familiar with the Temptation narratives in some form.

- Stones into Bread: John 6:26, 31 to make bread in the wilderness.
- Jump from the temple: John 2:18 to perform a Messianic sign in the temple.
- Kingdoms of the World: John 6:15 to take the kingdom by force.

== Historicity ==
E. P. Sanders notes that it is difficult to assess whether the fast of 40 days was by the historical Jesus or a creation of the early Church; there is a parallel with the 40 years of wandering by the Israelites in the desert of Sinai. Many scholars believe the quotations shared by Matthew and Luke originate in the hypothetical Q source, though many others increasingly reject the hypothesis in favor of Luke's use of Matthew or vice versa.

Sanders writes that it is likely Jesus was alone for meditation at times, felt temptations, and fasted prior to his ministry, with even the 'forty days' being possible. However, he finds the conversation with Satan, the scene at the top of the Temple, and the vision of the kingdoms to be mythological elaborations of the historical event. Dale Allison was long convinced that Matthew and Luke's temptation stories were fictional stories based on Deuteronomy, but has recently expressed second thoughts. If the historical Jesus held a Mosaic typology, as Allison argues, then the temptation narratives might rather be mythic elaborations on an actual retreat into the wilderness by Jesus to reenact the fast of Moses, similar to the baptismal narratives. Regardless, aspects of the stories such as Jesus successfully fighting the devil, his association with the Holy Spirit, his knowledge of the Hebrew Bible, his miraculous powers, and depiction of messianic identity are consistent with what is otherwise known of the historical Jesus. Craig Evans argues in favor of the temptation narratives' historicity given its coherence with the motif of battle with Satan found in the gospels.

== Art, literature, film and music ==
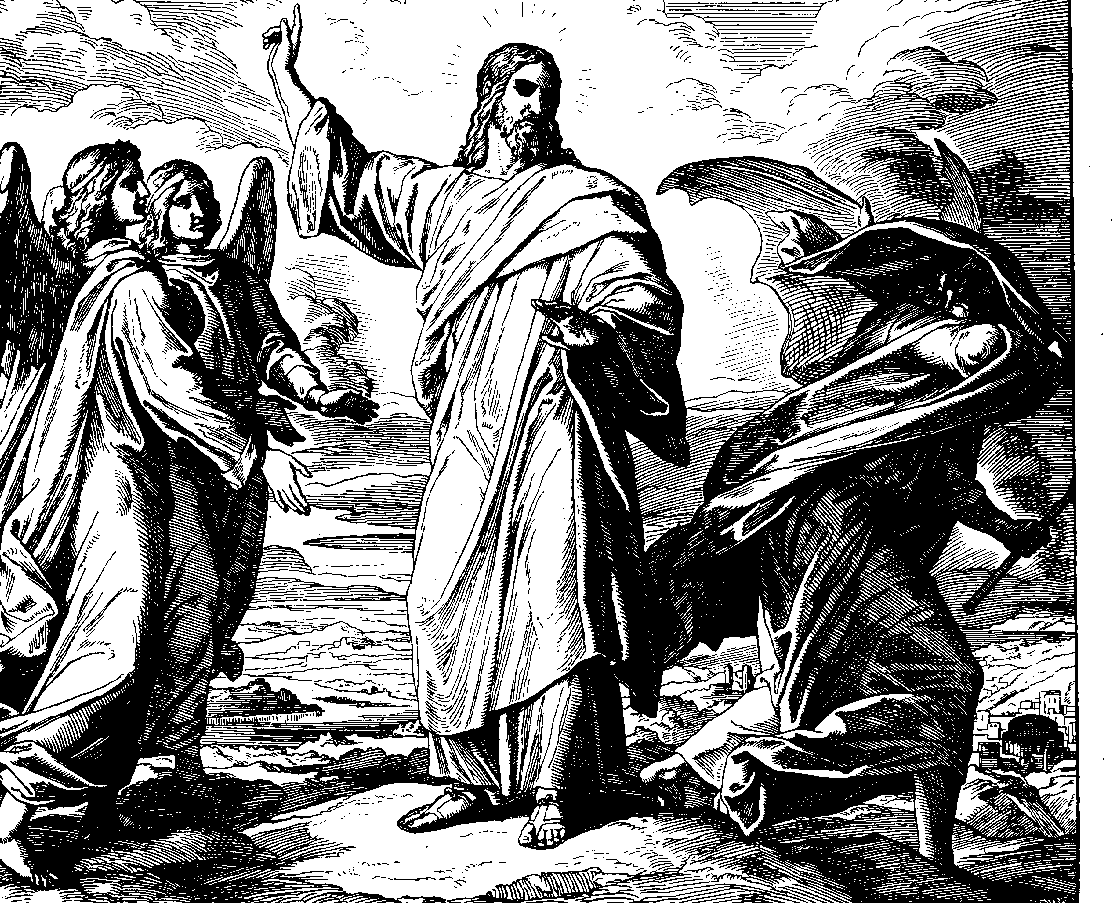
Woodcut by Julius Schnorr von Karolsfeld, 1860

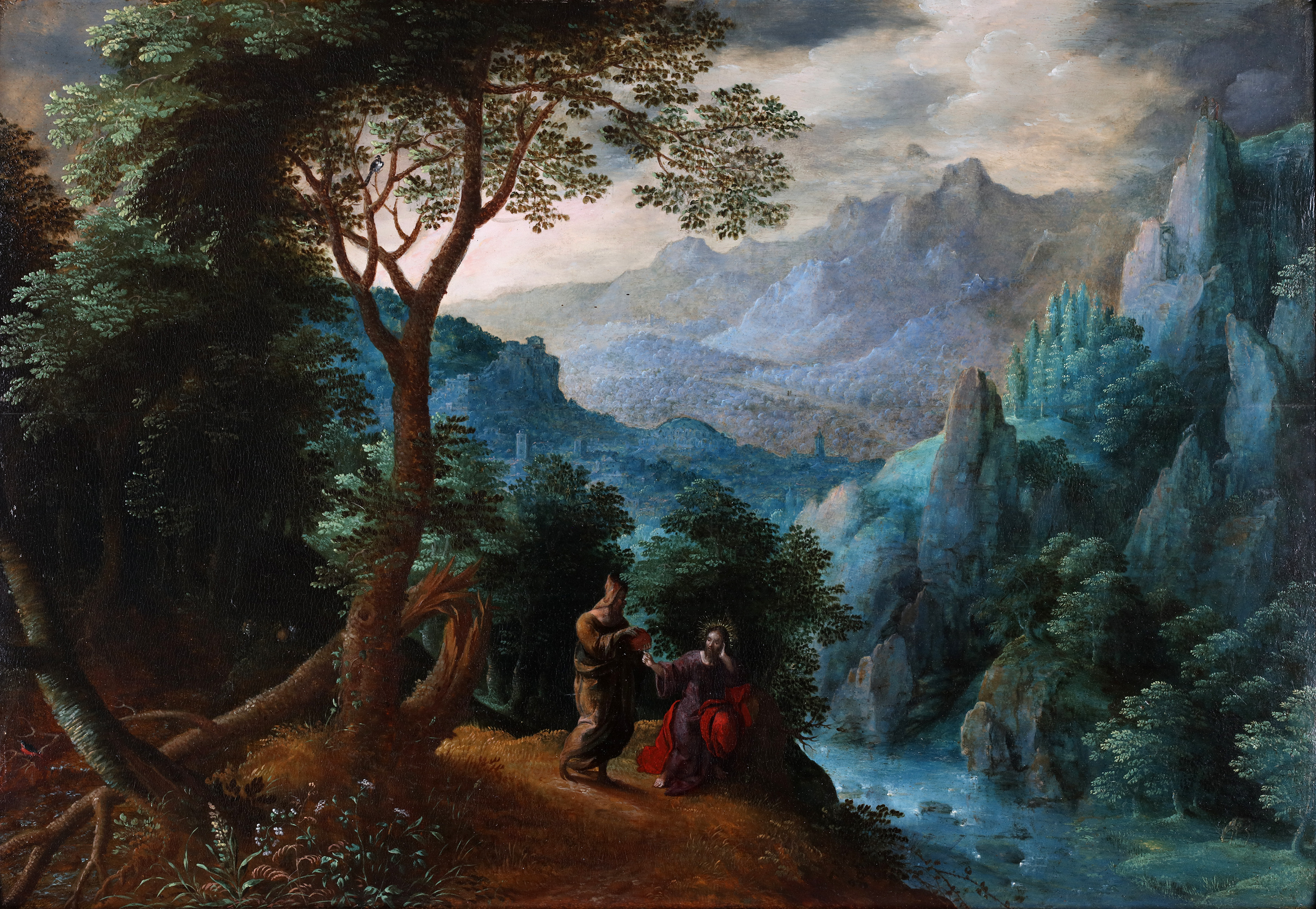
The temptation of Christ by Tobias Verhaecht

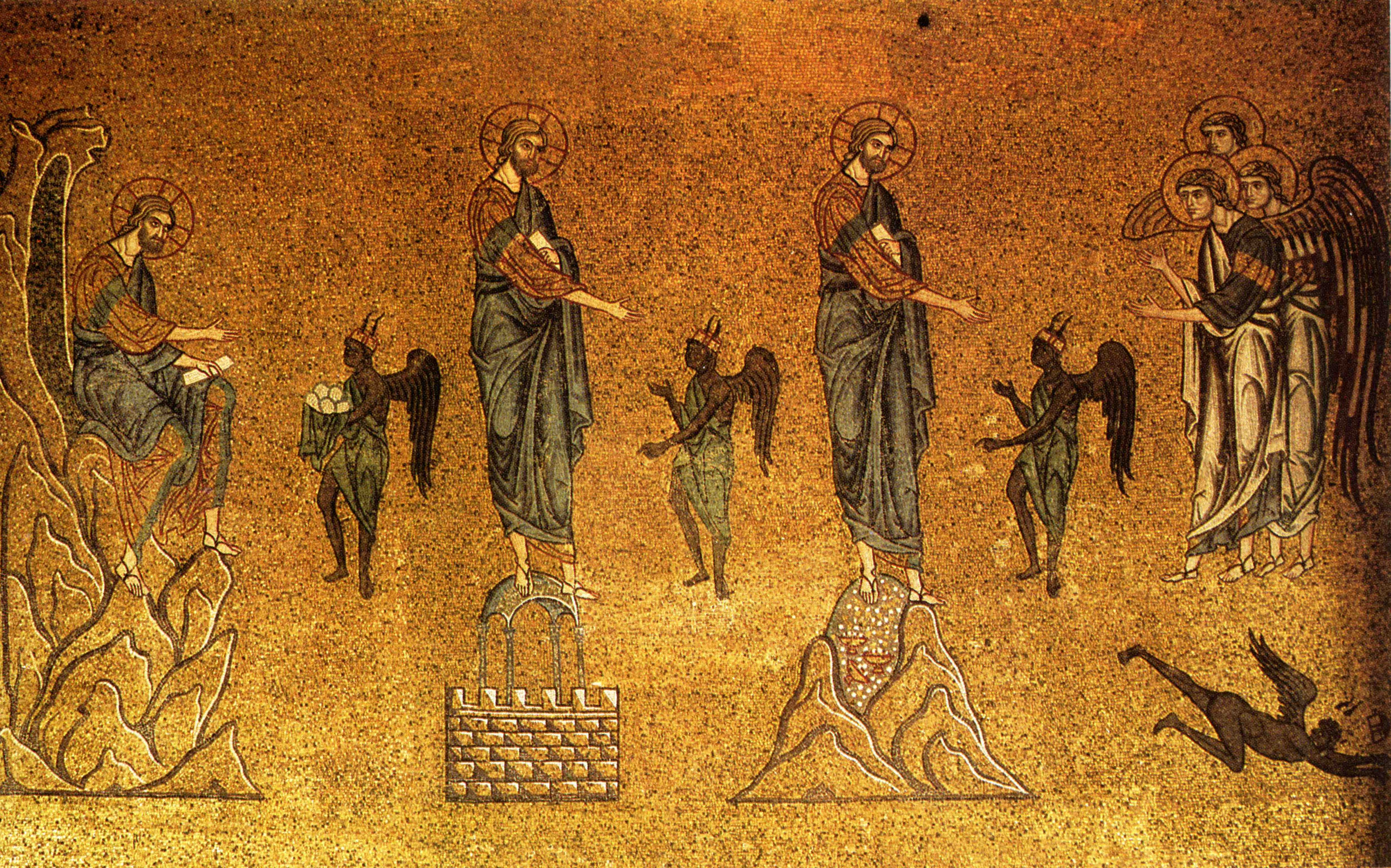
12th-century mosaic in St Mark's Basilica, Venice

The temptation of Christ has been a frequent subject in the art and literature of Christian cultures. A scene usually interpreted as the third temptation of Jesus is depicted in the Book of Kells. The third and last part of the Old English poem Christ and Satan concerns The Temptation of Christ, and can be seen as a precursor to John Milton's Paradise Lost. The Temptation of Christ is indeed the subject of Milton's sequel to Paradise Lost, Paradise Regained. J. M. W. Turner did an engraving of "The Temptation on the Mountain" for an 1835 edition of The Poetical Works of John Milton. Satan and Jesus stand in silhouette on a cliff overlooking a broad landscape that transitions into the sea. The "...image depicts the temptation of Christ by Satan, specifically the moment where Satan offers Christ the kingdoms of the world. This vision of the temptation as extending to the open sea is eerily similar to the possibilities of conquest as commonly depicted in British and American art during the Romantic era."

Quarantine is a novel by Jim Crace with seven characters in the desert, fasting and praying, and includes Jesus as a peripheral cast member.

An illuminated scene in the Très Riches Heures du Duc de Berry, a 15th-century book of hours, depicts Jesus standing atop a Gothic castle based upon the Duke's own castle at Mehun-sur-Yevre. Daniella Zsupan-Jerome sees this as a challenge to "...the Duke and meant to recall him to humility and conversion..."

Fyodor Dostoyevsky's The Brothers Karamazov, part of the novel, The Grand Inquisitor, features an extended treatment of the temptation of Christ. Kathleen E. Gilligan draws parallels with J. R. R. Tolkien's The Lord of the Rings in which characters Gandalf and Galadriel, both powerful figures each in their own right, are tempted to acquire the One Ring and become more powerful for the best of reasons but with likely disastrous results.

Andrew Lloyd Webber's Jesus Christ Superstar has brief references to Christ being tempted by mortal pleasures, and Stephen Schwartz devotes a scene to it in Godspell. In W. Somerset Maugham's The Razor's Edge, the narrator uses the gospel of Matthew to introduce his own ending in which Jesus accepts death on the cross, "for greater love hath no man," while the devil laughs in glee, knowing that man will reject this redemption and commit evil in spite of, if not because of, this great sacrifice.

In the 1989 film Jesus of Montreal, the actor playing Jesus is taken to the top of a skyscraper and offered lucrative contracts by a lawyer if he will serve him. The 2019 television miniseries Good Omens credits the temptation of Christ to the demon Crowley, who claims to have shown Christ the kingdoms of the world as mere travel opportunities.

The temptation of Christ in the desert is shown in the following theatrical and television films: King of Kings (US 1961, Nicholas Ray), The Gospel According to Matthew (Italy 1964, directed by Pier Paolo Pasolini), The Greatest Story Ever Told (US 1965, George Stevens), Jesus (US, 1979, Peter Sykes and John Krish), The Last Temptation of Christ (US, 1988, Martin Scorsese), Jesus (1999 TV film, Roger Young), The Miracle Maker (UK-US TV film, 2000), The Bible (US 2013 TV miniseries, Roma Downey and Mark Burnett), Last Days in the Desert (US, 2015, Rodrigo Garcia), and 40: The Temptation of Jesus Christ (US, 2020, Douglas James Vail).

Dave Matthews' single "Save Me" from the album Some Devil recounts Christ's time in the desert from Satan's point of view.

== See also ==
- Chronology of Jesus
- Life of Jesus in the New Testament
- The world, the flesh, and the devil
- War in Heaven
- Mara (demon), similar theme in Buddhism

Temptation of Christ Life of Jesus: Ministry
Preceded by Baptism of Jesus	New Testament; Events	Succeeded by Return of Jesus to Galilee
