= Ministry of Jesus =

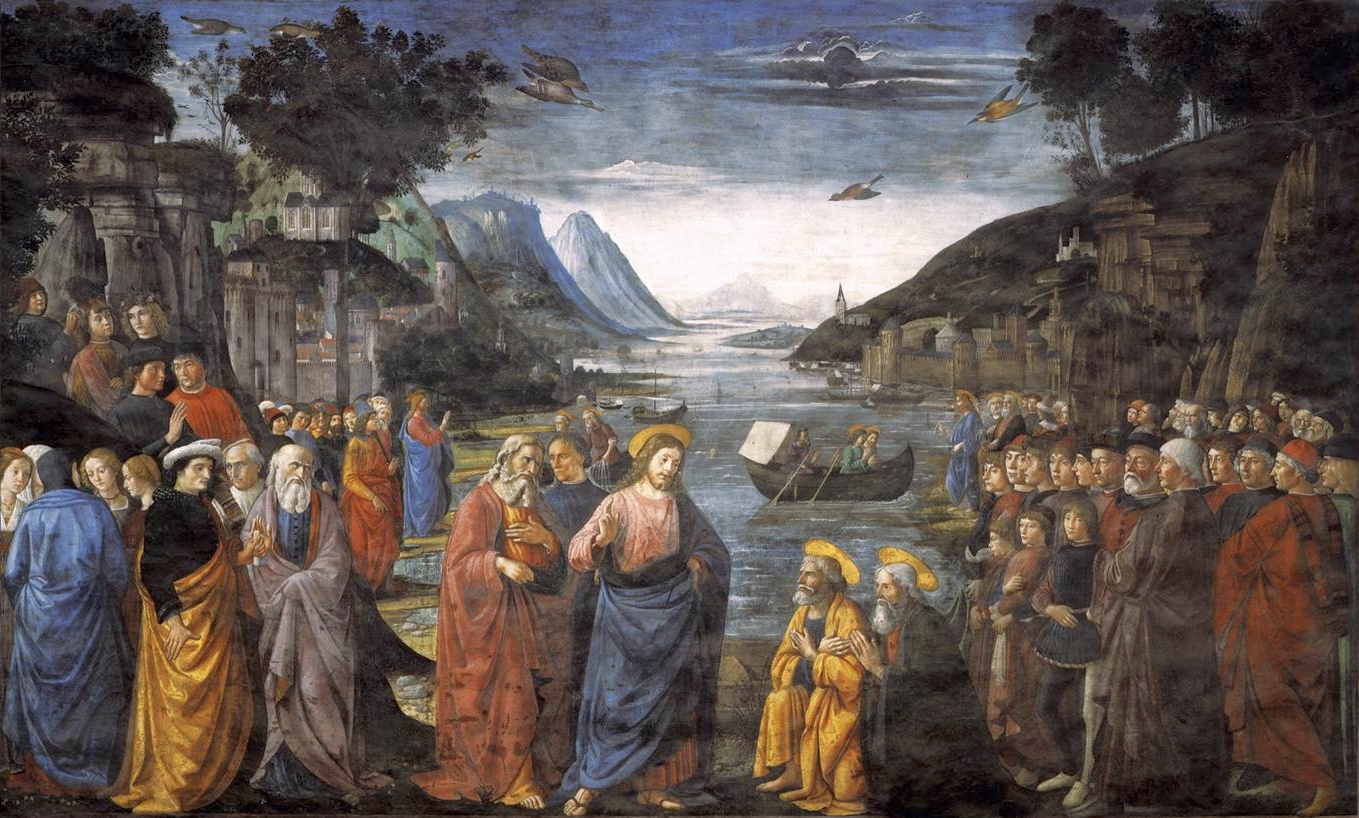
Vocation of the Apostles (1481) by Domenico Ghirlandaio

The ministry of Jesus, in the canonical gospels, begins with his baptism near the River Jordan by John the Baptist, and ends in Jerusalem in Judea, following the Last Supper with his disciples. The Gospel of Luke states that Jesus was "about 30 years of age" at the start of his ministry. A chronology of Jesus typically sets the date of the start of his ministry at around AD 27–29 and the end in the range AD 30–36. (Note: Eerdmans Dictionary of the Bible states that Jesus began his ministry "ca 28 AD" at "ca age 31". In Chronos, Kairos, Christos: Paul L. Maier specifically states that he considers the Temple visit date in John at "around 29 AD/CE", using various factors that he summarizes in a chronology table. Maier's table considers 28 AD/CE to be roughly the 32nd birthday of Jesus, and elsewhere he states that 5 BC was the year of Jesus' birth. Paul N. Anderson dates the temple incident at "around 26–27 AD/CE" Jerry Knoblet estimates the date as around AD 27 AD/CE. In their book, Robert Fortna & Thatcher estimate the date at around AD/CE 28. Köstenberger & Kellum (p. 140) make the same statement as Maier, namely that the 32nd birthday of Jesus was around 28 AD/CE when his ministry began.)

Jesus' early Galilean ministry begins when after his baptism, he goes back to Galilee from his temptation in the Judaean Desert. In this early period, he preaches around Galilee and recruits his first disciples who begin to travel with him and eventually form the core of the early Church as it is believed that the apostles dispersed from Jerusalem to found the apostolic sees. The major Galilean ministry which begins in Matthew 8 includes the commissioning of the Twelve Apostles, and covers most of the ministry of Jesus in Galilee. The final Galilean ministry begins after the beheading of John the Baptist as Jesus prepares to go to Jerusalem.

In the later Judean ministry Jesus starts his final journey to Jerusalem through Judea. As Jesus travels towards Jerusalem, in the later Perean ministry, about one third the way down from the Sea of Galilee (actually a freshwater lake) along the River Jordan, he returns to the area where he was baptized.

The final ministry in Jerusalem is sometimes called the Passion week and begins with Jesus' triumphal entry into Jerusalem. The gospels provide more details about the final ministry than the other periods, devoting about one third of their text to the last week of the life of Jesus in Jerusalem.

== Overview ==
Judea, Galilee and neighbouring regions during the ministry of Jesus

The gospel accounts place the beginning of Jesus' ministry in the countryside of Roman province Judaea, near the River Jordan.

The gospels present John the Baptist's ministry as the precursor to that of Jesus and the baptism of Jesus as marking the beginning of Jesus' ministry, after which Jesus travels, preaches and performs miracles. Jesus's baptism is generally considered the beginning and the Last Supper with his disciples in Jerusalem as the end of his ministry. However, some authors also consider the period between the Resurrection and the Ascension part of the ministry of Jesus.

Luke 3:23 states that Jesus was "about 30 years of age" at the start of his ministry. There have been different approaches to estimating the date of the start of the ministry of Jesus. One approach, based on combining information from the Gospel of Luke with historical data about Emperor Tiberius yields a date around 28–29 AD/CE, while a second independent approach based on statements in the Gospel of John along with historical information from Josephus about the Temple in Jerusalem leads to a date around AD 27–29.

In the New Testament, the date of the Last Supper is very close before the date of the crucifixion of Jesus (hence its name). Scholarly estimates for the date of the crucifixion generally fall in the range AD 30–36.

The three Synoptic Gospels refer to just one passover, specifically the Passover at the end of Jesus's ministry when he is crucified (with the exception of Luke's Gospel, which narrates a visit of the Holy Family for Passover when Jesus is twelve years old). There are three references to Passovers in John's Gospel: 2:13, 6:4, and 12:1. Some contend that the Gospel of John refers to only two actual Passovers, one at the beginning of Jesus's ministry and the second at the end of Jesus's ministry, and that the third reference to Passover is only a forecasting of the second Passover in the Gospel of John. But much scholarship recognizes that a lot of time passes between 6:4, "the Passover... was at hand," and 12:1, "Six days before the Passover, Jesus came to Bethany...," especially at the beginning of Chapter 7 which even includes another feast (Booths/Tabernacles), and then again at 10:22 another season passes as well as the Feast of Dedication.

This third reference to a passover in the Gospel of John is why many suggest that Jesus's ministry was a period of about three years. Scholars that support a three-year ministry, such as Köstenberger state that the Gospel of John simply provides a more detailed account.

During the ministry of Jesus, the tetrarch ruling over Galilee and Perea in this period was Herod Antipas, who obtained the position upon the division of the territories following the death of Herod the Great in 4 BC.

== Baptism and early ministry ==
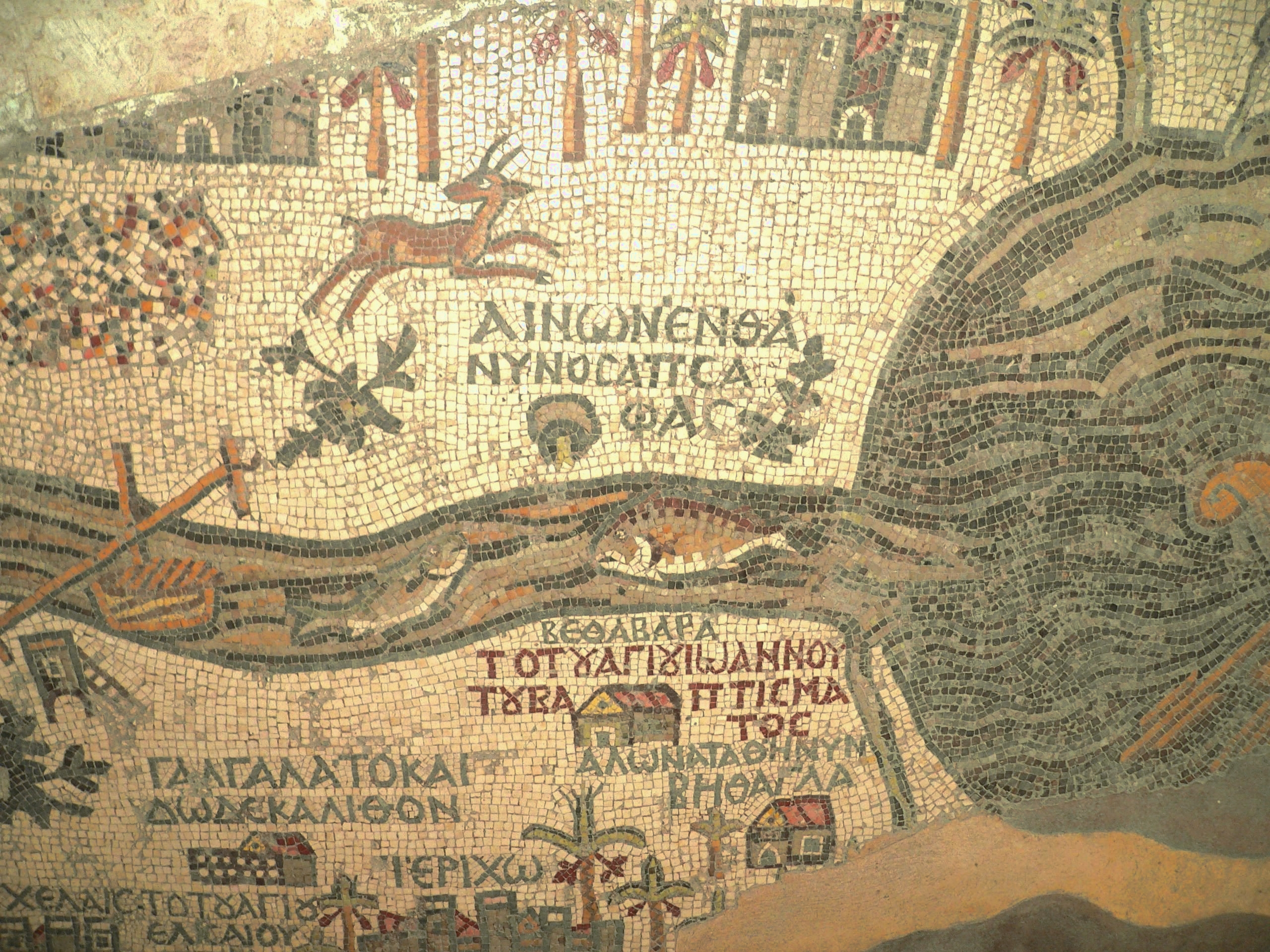
Part of the Madaba Map showing Bethabara (Βέθαβαρά), calling it the place where John baptized

The gospels present John the Baptist's ministry as the precursor to that of Jesus and the Baptism of Jesus as marking the beginning of Jesus' ministry.

In his sermon in Acts 10:37–38, delivered in the house of Cornelius the centurion, Apostle Peter gives an overview of the ministry of Jesus, and refers to what had happened "throughout all Judaea, beginning from Galilee, after the baptism which John preached" and that Jesus whom "God anointed with the Holy Spirit and with power" had gone about "doing good".

John 1:28 specifies the location where John was baptizing as "Bethany beyond the Jordan". This is not the village Bethany just east of Jerusalem, but the town of Bethabara in Perea. Perea is the province east of the Jordan, across the southern part of Samaria, and although the New Testament does not mention Perea by name, John 3:23 implicitly refers to it again when it states that John was baptising in Enon near Salim, "because there was much water there". First-century historian Flavius Josephus also wrote in the Antiquities of the Jews (18 5.2) that John the Baptist was imprisoned and then killed in Machaerus on the border of Perea.

Luke 3:23 and Luke 4:1 indicate possible activities of Jesus near the Jordan River around the time of his baptism, as does the initial encounter with the disciples of John the Baptist in John 1:35–37, where "two disciples heard him speak, and they followed Jesus". Assuming that there were two incidences of Cleansing of the Temple, which was located in Jerusalem, a possible reference to an early Judean ministry may be John 2:13–25.

== Ministry in Galilee ==
=== Early Galilean ministry ===
The Early Galilean ministry begins when, according to Matthew, Jesus goes back to Galilee from the Judaean Desert, after rebuffing the temptation of Satan. In this early period, Jesus preaches around Galilee and, in Matthew 4:18–20, his first disciples encounter him, begin to travel with him and eventually form the core of the early Church.

The Gospel of John includes the Wedding at Cana as the first miracle of Jesus taking place in this early period of ministry, with his return to Galilee. A few villages in Galilee (e.g. Kafr Kanna) have been suggested as the location of Cana.

The return of Jesus to Galilee follows the arrest of John the Baptist. The early teachings of Jesus result in his rejection at his hometown when in Luke 4:16–30 Jesus says in a Synagogue, "No prophet is acceptable in his own country", and the people reject him.

In this early period, Jesus' reputation begins to spread throughout Galilee. In Mark 1:21–28 and Luke 4:31–37, Jesus goes to Capernaum, where people are "astonished at his teaching; for his word was with authority", in the Exorcism at the Synagogue in Capernaum episode, which is followed by healing the mother of Peter's wife.

Luke 5:1–11 includes the first Miraculous draught of fishes episode in which Jesus tells Peter, "now on you will catch men". Peter leaves his net and, along with him, James and John, the sons of Zebedee, follows Jesus as disciples thereafter.

This period includes the Sermon on the Mount, one of the major discourses of Jesus in Matthew, and the Sermon on the Plain in the Gospel of Luke. The Sermon on the Mount, which covers chapters 5, 6 and 7 of the Gospel of Matthew, is the first of the Five Discourses of Matthew and is the longest piece of teaching from Jesus in the New Testament. It encapsulates many of the moral teachings of Jesus and includes the Beatitudes and the widely recited Lord's Prayer.

The Beatitudes are expressed as eight blessings in the Sermon on the Mount in Matthew, and four similar blessings appear in the Sermon on the Plain in Luke, where they are followed by four woes that mirror the blessings. The Beatitudes present the highest ideals of the teachings of Jesus on mercy, spirituality and compassion.

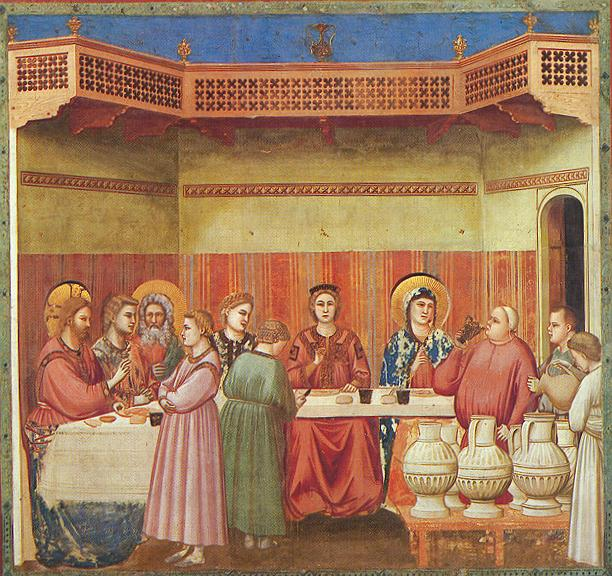
Marriage at Cana

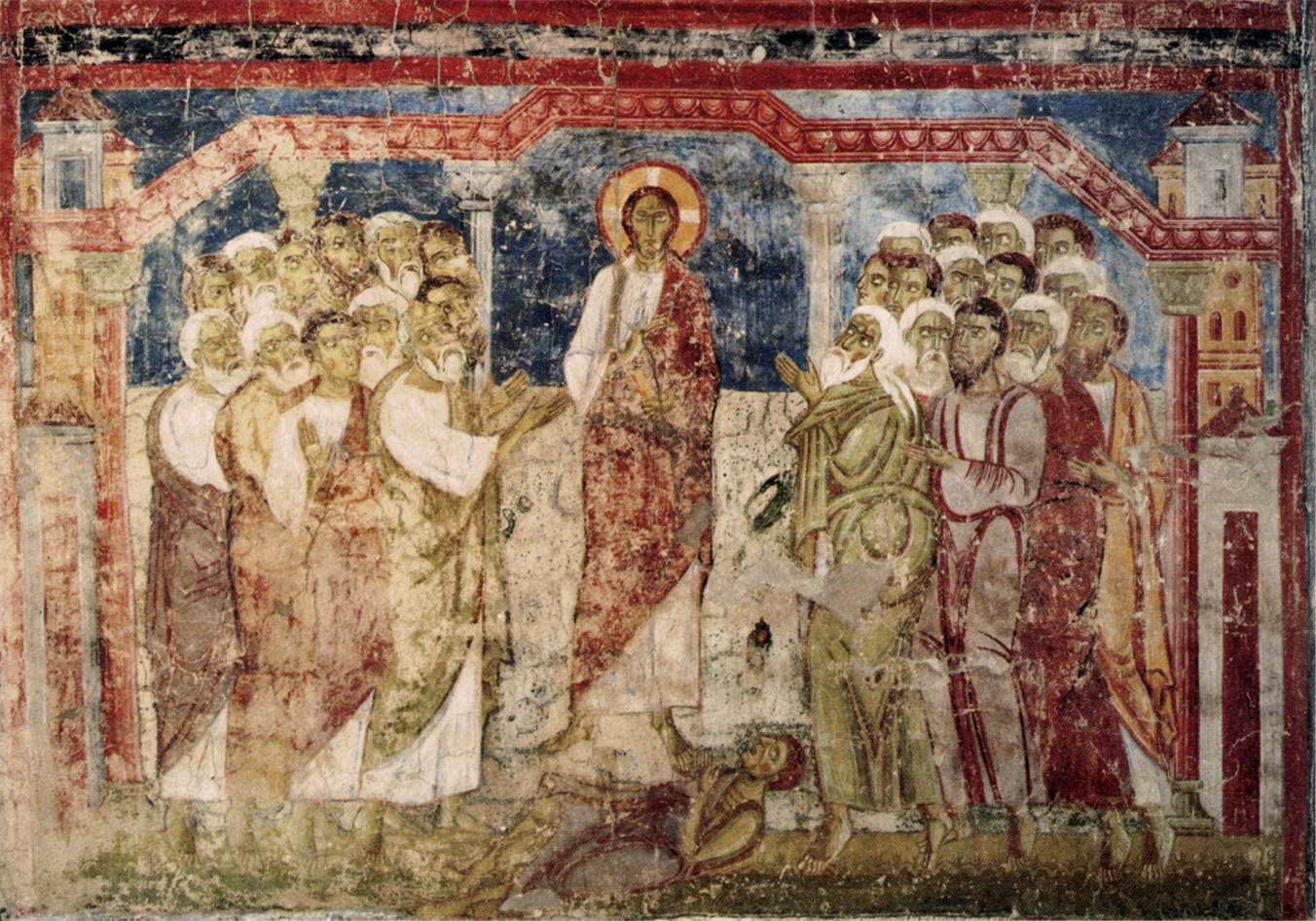
Synagogue in Capernaum

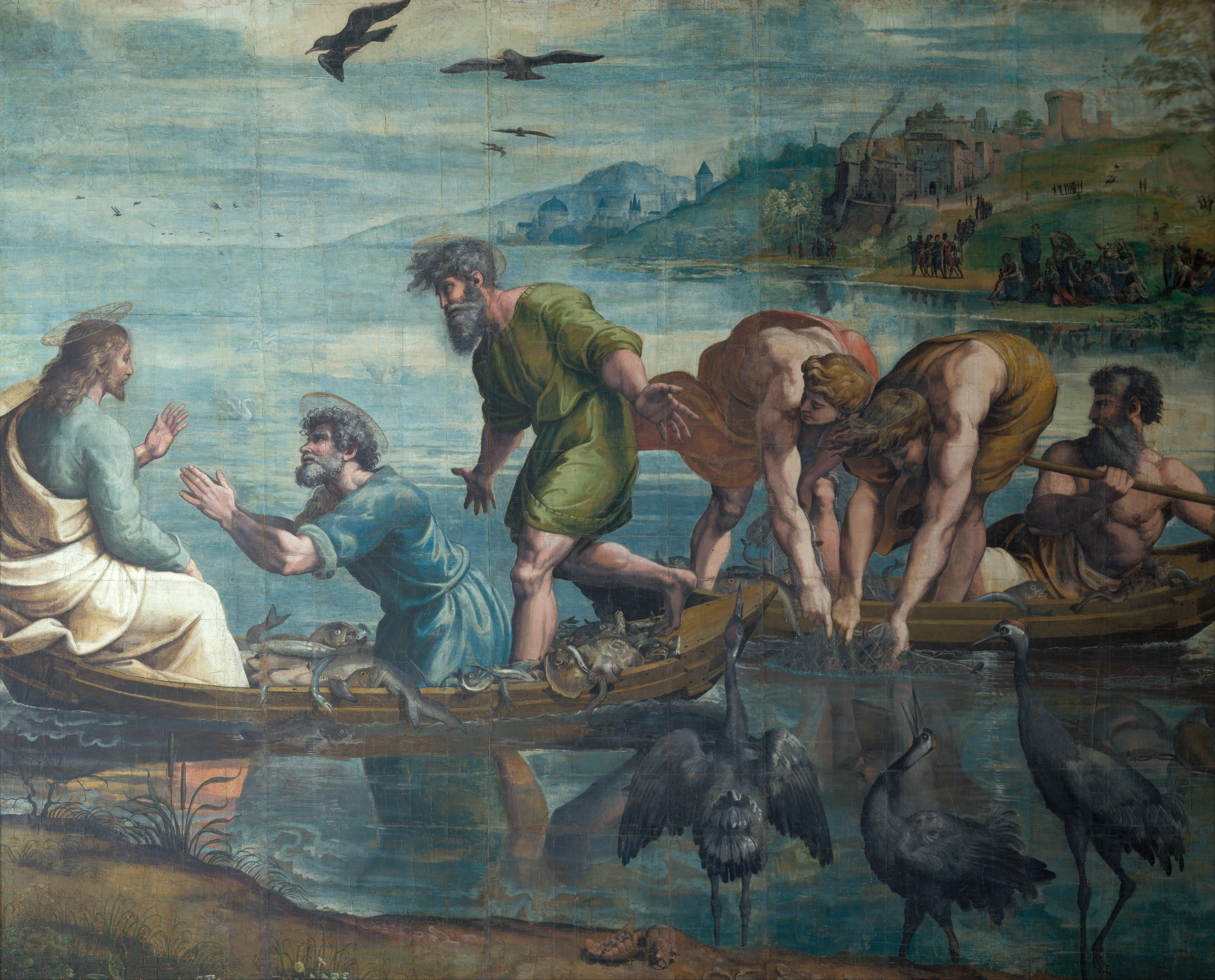
First disciples and Miraculous catch of fish

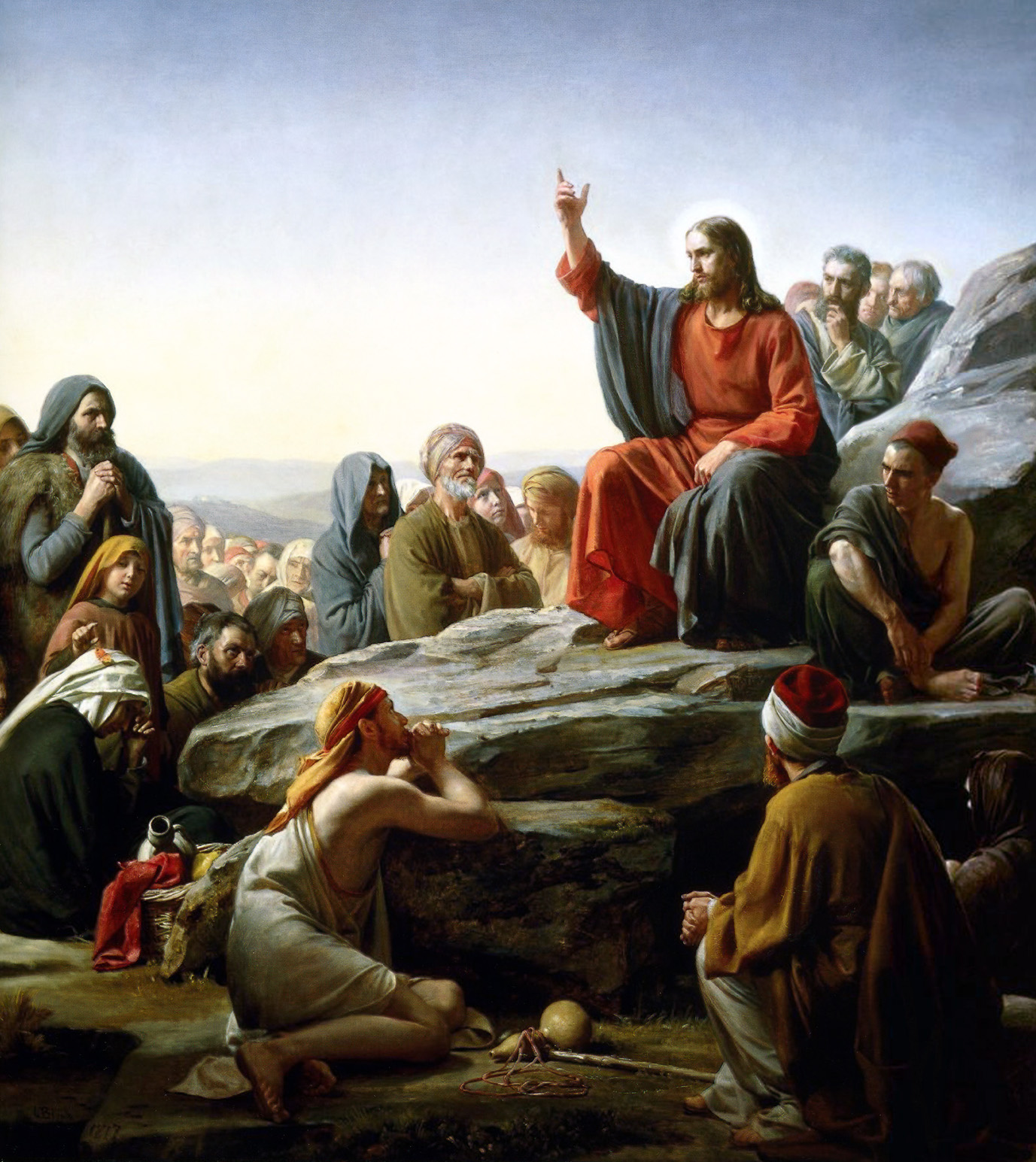
Sermon on the Mount

=== Major Galilean ministry ===
The Major Galilean ministry, also called the Great Galilean ministry, begins in Matthew 8, after the Sermon on the Mount and refers to activities up to the death of John the Baptist.

The beginnings of this period include The Centurion's Servant (Matthew 8:5–13) and Calming the storm (Matthew 8:23–27), both dealing with the theme of faith and fear. When the Centurion shows faith in Jesus by requesting a "healing at a distance", Jesus commends him for his exceptional faith. On the other hand, when his own disciples show fear of a storm on the Sea of Galilee, Jesus instructs them to have more faith, after he orders the storm to stop.

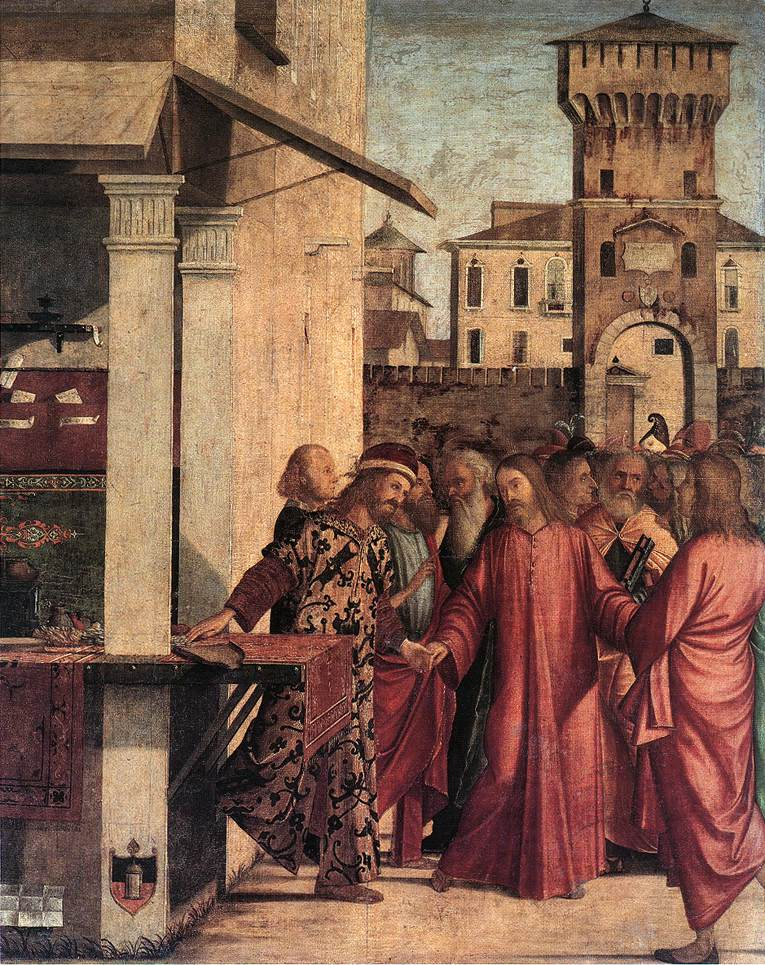
The Calling of Matthew by Vittore Carpaccio, 1502

In this period, Jesus is still gathering the twelve apostles, and the Calling of Matthew takes place in Matthew 9:9. The conflicts and criticism between Jesus and the Pharisees continue, e.g. they criticize Jesus for associating with "publicans and sinners", whereby Jesus responds: "It is not healthy who need a doctor, but the sick. I have not come to call the righteous, but sinners to repentance."

Commissioning the twelve Apostles relates the initial selection of the twelve Apostles among the disciples of Jesus. Jesus goes out to a mountainside to pray, and after spending the night praying to God, in the morning he calls his disciples and chooses twelve of them.

In the Mission Discourse, Jesus instructs the twelve apostles who are named in Matthew 10:2–3 to carry no belongings as they travel from city to city and preach. Separately, Luke 10:1–24 relates the Seventy Disciples, where Jesus appoints a larger number of disciples and sends them out in pairs with the Missionary's Mandate to go into villages before Jesus' arrival there.

In Matthew 11:2–6 two messengers from John the Baptist arrive to ask Jesus if he is the expected Messiah, or "shall we wait for another?" Jesus replies, "Go back and report to John what you hear and see: The blind receive sight, the lame walk". Following this, Jesus begins to speak to the crowds about the Baptist.

This period is rich in parables and teachings and includes the Parabolic discourse, which provides many of the parables for the Kingdom of Heaven, beginning in Matthew 13:1. These include the parables of The Sower, The Tares, The Mustard Seed and The Leaven, addressed to the public at large, as well as The Hidden Treasure, The Pearl and Drawing in the Net.

At the end of the Major Galilean ministry, Jesus returns to his hometown, Nazareth. His wisdom is recognised there, questioned, and rejected.

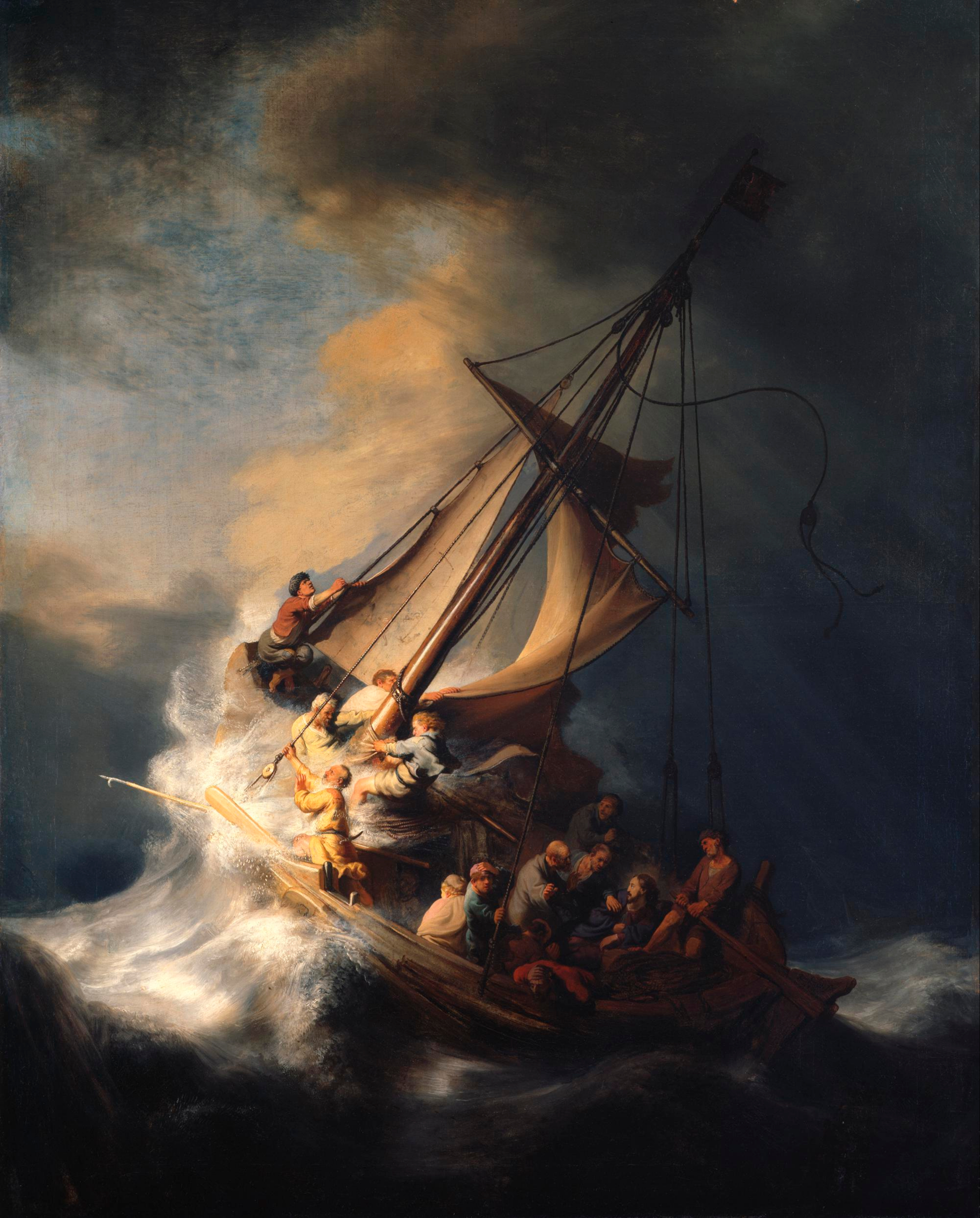
Calming the storm

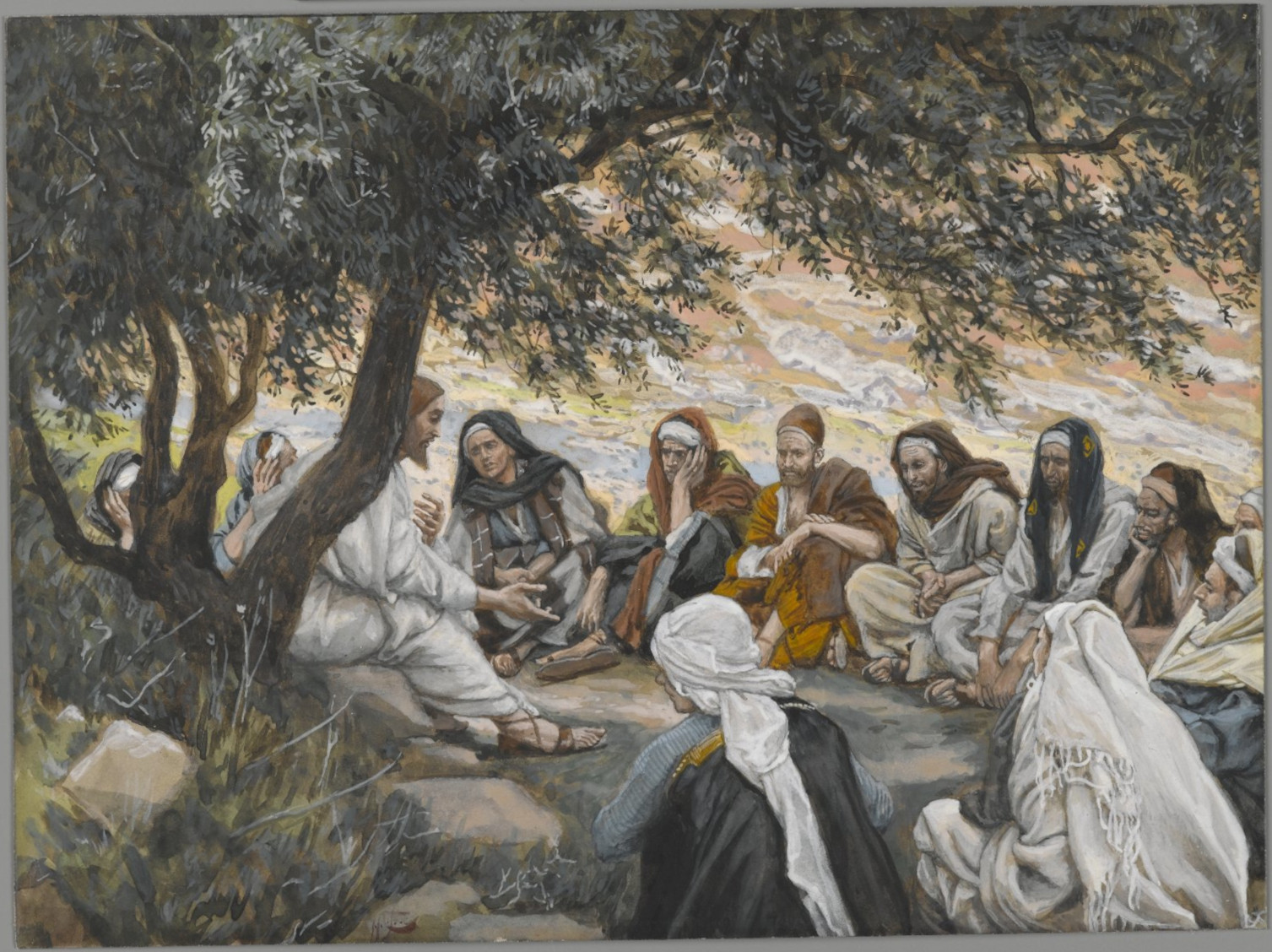
Twelve Apostles

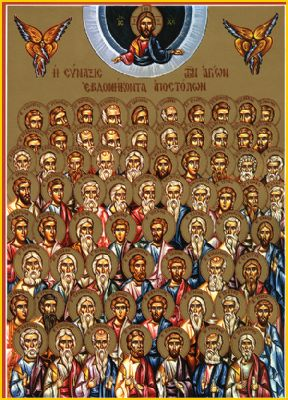
Seventy Disciples

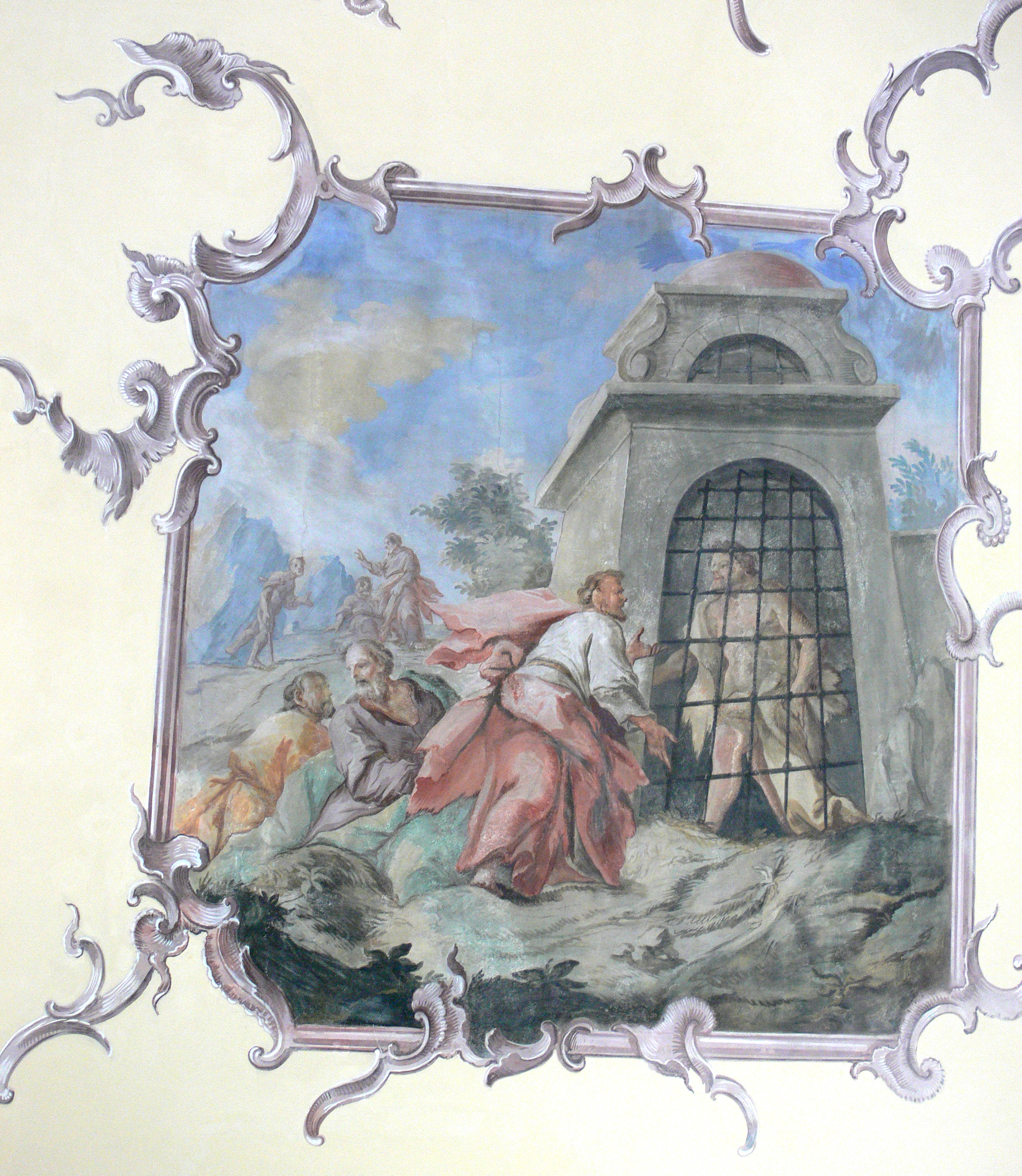
Baptist's Messengers

=== Final Galilean ministry ===
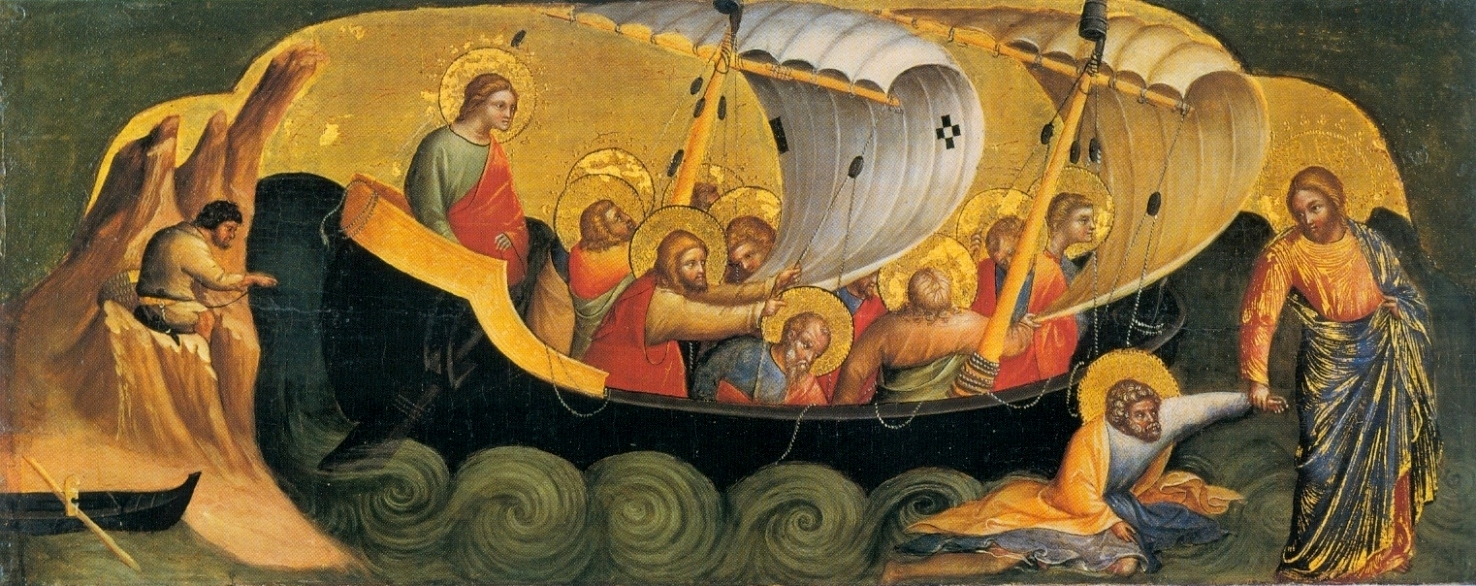
Walking on water, by Veneziano, 1370

The Final Galilean ministry begins after the death of John the Baptist, and includes the Feeding the 5000 and Walking on water episodes, both in Matthew 14. After hearing of the Baptist's death, Jesus withdraws by boat privately to a solitary place near Bethsaida, where he addresses the crowds who had followed him on foot from the towns, and feeds them all with "five loaves and two fish" supplied by a boy.

Following this, the gospels present the Walking on water episode in Matthew 14:22–23, Mark 6:45–52 and John 6:16–21 as an important step in developing the relationship between Jesus and his disciples, at this stage of his ministry. The episode emphasizes the importance of faith by stating that, when he attempted to walk on water, Peter began to sink when he lost faith and became afraid. At the end of the episode, the disciples increase their faith in Jesus, and, in Matthew 14:33, they say, "Of a truth thou art the Son of God".

Major teachings in this period include the Discourse on Defilement in Matthew 15:1–20 and Mark 7:1–23 where, in response to a complaint from the Pharisees, Jesus states: "What goes into a man's mouth does not make him 'unclean,' but what comes out of his mouth, that is what makes him 'unclean.'".

Following this episode, Jesus withdraws into the "parts of Tyre and Sidon" near the Mediterranean Sea, where the Canaanite woman's daughter episode takes place in Matthew 15:21–28 and Mark 7:24–30. This episode is an example of how Jesus emphasizes the value of faith, telling the woman: "Woman, you have great faith! Your request is granted." The importance of faith is also emphasized in the Cleansing ten lepers episode in Luke 17:11–19.

In the Gospel of Mark, after passing through Sidon, Jesus enters the region of the Decapolis, a group of ten cities south-east of Galilee, where the Healing the deaf mute miracle is reported in Mark 7:31–37. After the healing, the disciples say, "He even makes the deaf hear and the mute speak." The episode is the last in a series of narrated miracles which builds up to Peter's proclamation of Jesus as Christ in Mark 8:29.

== Judea and Perea to Jerusalem ==
=== Later Judean ministry ===
In this period, Jesus starts his final journey to Jerusalem by going around Samaria, through Perea and on through Judea to Jerusalem. At the beginning of this period, Jesus predicts his death for the first time, and this prediction then builds up to the other two episodes, the final prediction being just before Jesus enters Jerusalem for the last time, the week of his crucifixion. In Matthew 16:21–28 and Mark 8:31–33, Jesus teaches his disciples that "the Son of Man must suffer many things and be rejected by the elders, chief priests and teachers of the law, and that he must be killed and after three days rise again."

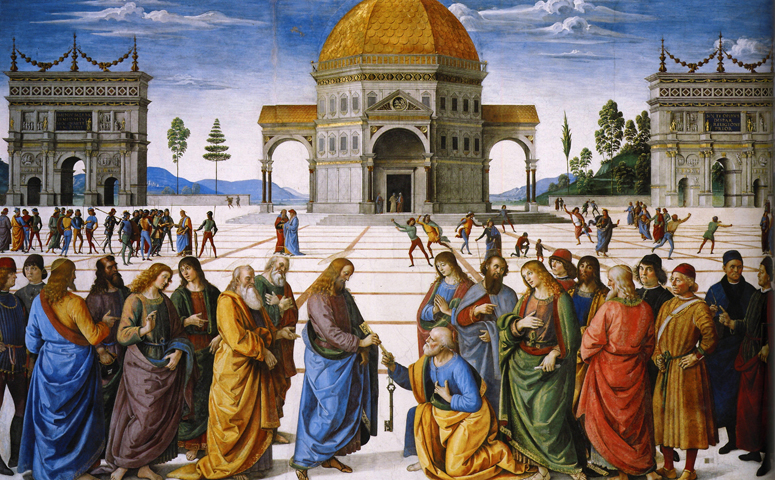
Pietro Perugino's depiction of the "Giving of the Keys to Saint Peter" by Jesus, 1492

Later in this period, at about the middle of each of the three Synoptic Gospels, two related episodes mark a turning point in the ministry of Jesus: the Confession of Peter and the Transfiguration of Jesus. These episodes begin in Caesarea Philippi, just north of the Sea of Galilee, at the beginning of the final journey to Jerusalem which ends in the Passion and Resurrection of Jesus. These episodes mark the beginnings of the gradual disclosure of the identity of Jesus as the Messiah to his disciples; and his prediction of his own suffering and death.

Peter's Confession begins as a dialogue between Jesus and his disciples in Matthew 16:13, Mark 8:27 and Luke 9:18. Jesus asks his disciples: But who do you say that I am? Simon Peter answers him: You are the Christ, the Son of the living God. In Matthew 16:17, Jesus blesses Peter for his answer, and states: "flesh and blood hath not revealed it unto thee, but my Father who is in heaven." In blessing Peter, Jesus not only accepts the titles Christ and Son of God, which Peter attributes to him, but declares the proclamation a divine revelation by stating that his Father in Heaven had revealed it to Peter. In this assertion, by endorsing both titles as divine revelation, Jesus unequivocally declares himself to be both Christ and the Son of God.

In the Gospel of Matthew, following this episode, Jesus also selects Peter as the leader of the Apostles, and states that "upon this rock, I will build my church". In Matthew 16:18 Jesus then continues: "That thou art Peter, and upon this rock, I will build my church". The word "church" (ekklesia in Greek) as used here, appears in the Gospels only once more, in Matthew 18:17, and refers to the community of believers at the time.

=== Later Perean ministry ===
Following the proclamation by Peter, the account of the Transfiguration of Jesus is the next major event and appears in Matthew 17:1–9, Mark 9:2–8 and Luke 9:28–36. Jesus takes Peter and two other apostles with him and goes up to a mountain, which is not named. Once on the mountain, Matthew 17:2 states that Jesus "was transfigured before them; his face shining as the sun, and his garments became white as the light." At that point, the prophets Elijah and Moses appear and Jesus begins to talk to them. Luke is specific in describing Jesus in a state of glory, with Luke 9:32 referring to "they saw his glory". A bright cloud appears around them, and a voice from the cloud states: "This is my beloved Son, with whom I am well pleased; listen to him".

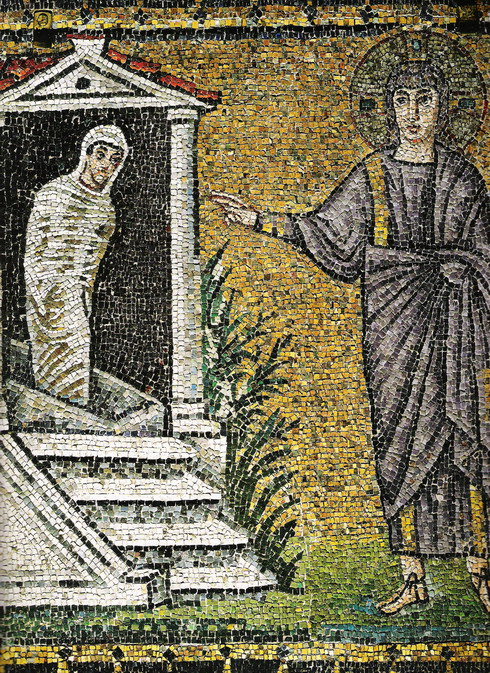
A sixth-century mosaic of the Raising of Lazarus, church of Sant'Apollinare Nuovo, Ravenna, Italy

The Transfiguration not only supports the identity of Jesus as the Son of God, (as in his Baptism), but the statement "listen to him" identifies him as the messenger and mouth-piece of God. The significance is enhanced by the presence of Elijah and Moses, for it indicates to the apostles that Jesus is the voice of God, and, instead of Elijah or Moses, he should be listened to, by virtue of his filial relationship with God. 2 Peter 1:16–18 echoes the same message: at the Transfiguration, God assigns to Jesus a special "honor and glory" and it is the turning point at which God exalts Jesus above all other powers in creation.

Many of the episodes in the Later Judean ministry are from the Gospel of Luke but, in general, these sequence of episodes in Luke do not provide enough geographical information to determine Perea, though scholars generally assume that the route Jesus followed from Galilee to Jerusalem passed through Perea. However, the Gospel of John does state that he returned to the area where he was baptized, and John 10:40–42 states that "many people believed in him beyond the Jordan", saying "all things whatsoever John spake of this man were true". The area where Jesus was baptised is inferred as the vicinity of the Perea area, given the activities of the Baptist in Bethabara and Ænon in John John 1:28 and John 3:23.

This period of ministry includes the Discourse on the Church, in which Jesus anticipates a future community of followers and explains the role of his apostles in leading it. It includes the parables of The Lost Sheep and The Unforgiving Servant in Matthew 18, which also refer to the Kingdom of Heaven. The general theme of the discourse is the anticipation of a future community of followers, and the role of his apostles in leading it.

Addressing his apostles in Matthew 18:18, Jesus states: "Truly, I say to you, whatever you bind on earth shall be bound in heaven, and whatever you loose on earth shall be loosed in heaven". The discourse emphasizes the importance of humility and self-sacrifice as the high virtues within the anticipated community. It teaches that in the Kingdom of God, it is personal humility that matters, not social prominence and clout.

At the end of this period, the Gospel of John includes the Raising of Lazarus episode in John 11:1–46, in which Jesus brings Lazarus of Bethany back to life four days after his burial. In the Gospel of John, the raising of Lazarus is the climax of the "seven signs" which gradually confirm the identity of Jesus as the Son of God and the expected Messiah. It is also a pivotal episode which starts the chain of events that leads to the crowds seeking Jesus on his Triumphal entry into Jerusalem—leading to the decision of Caiaphas and the Sanhedrin to plan to kill Jesus (Crucifixion of Jesus).

== Final ministry in Jerusalem ==
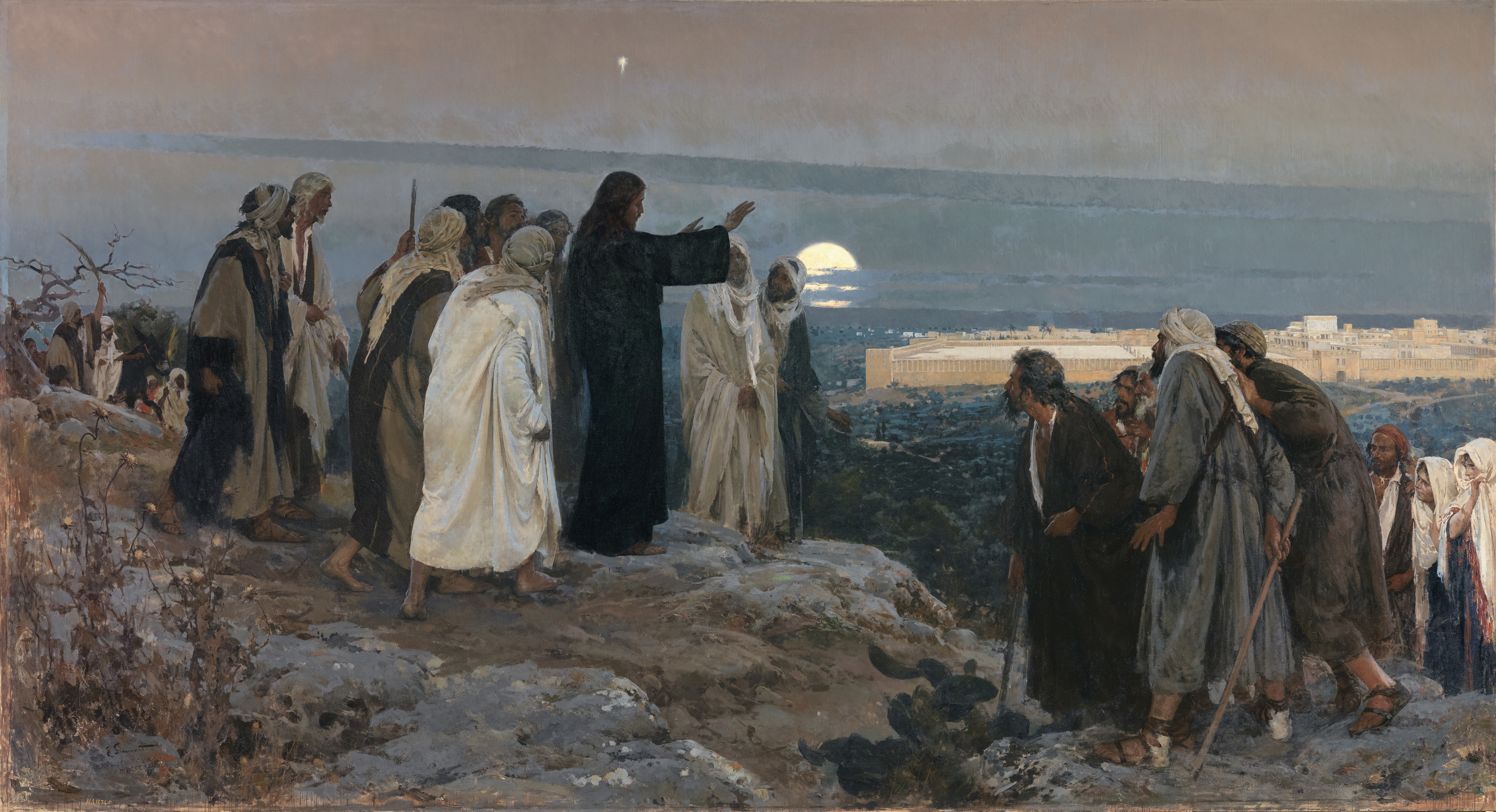
Flevit super illam (He wept over it); by Enrique Simonet, 1892.

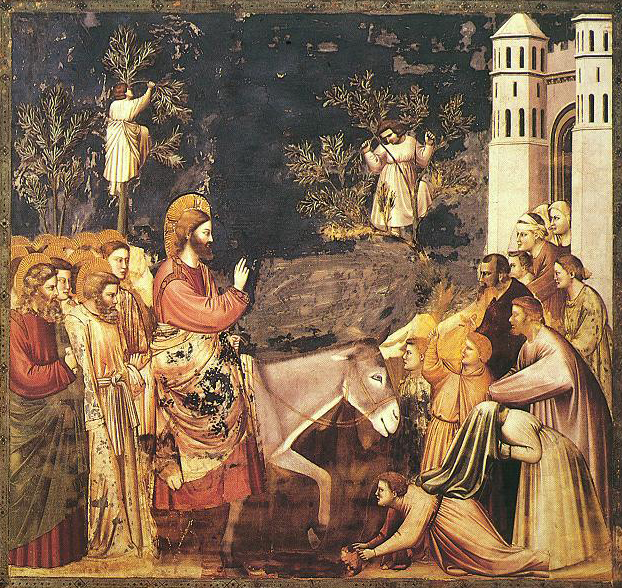
Jesus enters Jerusalem and the crowds welcome him, by Giotto, 14th century.

The final ministry in Jerusalem is traditionally called the Passion and begins with Jesus' triumphal entry into Jerusalem early in the week that includes the Last Supper and is liturgically marked as Holy Week. The gospels pay special attention to the account of the last week of the life of Jesus in Jerusalem, and the narrative amounts to about one third of the text of the four gospels, showing its theological significance in Christian thought in the Early Church.

Before arriving in Jerusalem, in John 12:9–11, after raising Lazarus from the dead, crowds gather around Jesus and believe in him, and the next day the multitudes that had gathered for the feast in Jerusalem welcome Jesus as he descends from the Mount of Olives towards Jerusalem in Matthew 21:1–11, Mark 11:1–11,Luke 19:28–44 and John 12:12–19. In Luke 19:41–44 as Jesus approaches Jerusalem, he looks at the city and weeps over it, foretelling the suffering that awaits the city.

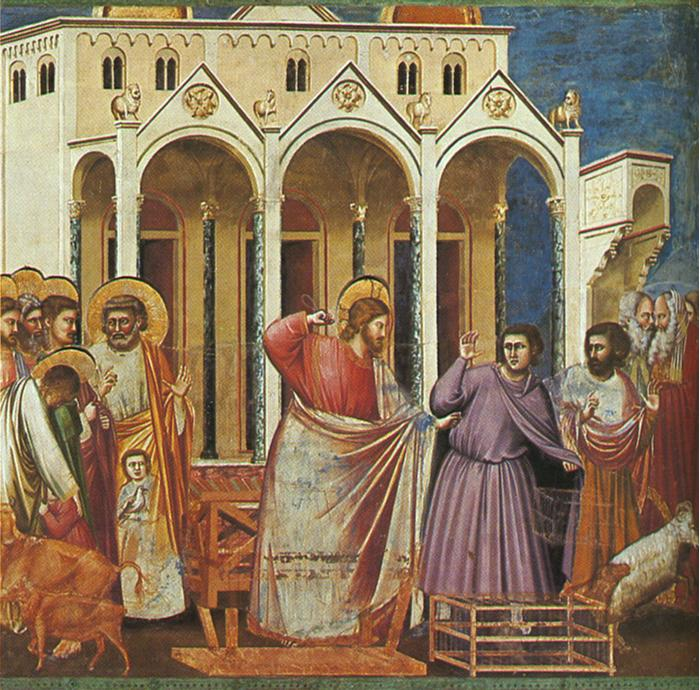
Casting out the Money Changers by Giotto, 14th century

In the three Synoptic Gospels, entry into Jerusalem is followed by the Cleansing of the Temple episode, in which Jesus expels the money changers from the Temple, accusing them of turning the Temple to a den of thieves through their commercial activities. This is the only account of Jesus using physical force in any of the Gospels. The synoptics include a number of well known parables and sermons such as the Widow's mite and the Second Coming Prophecy during the week that follows.

In that week, the synoptics also narrate conflicts between Jesus and the elders of the Jews, in episodes such as the Authority of Jesus Questioned and the Woes of the Pharisees, in which Jesus criticizes their hypocrisy. Judas Iscariot, one of the twelve apostles, approaches the Jewish elders and performs the "Bargain of Judas" in which he accepts to betray Jesus and hand him over to the elders. Matthew specifies the price as thirty silver coins.

In Matthew 24, Mark 13 and Luke 21, Jesus provides a Discourse on the End Times, which is also called the Olivet Discourse because it was given on the Mount of Olives. The discourse is mostly about judgment and the expected conduct of the followers of Jesus, and the need for vigilance by the followers in view of the coming judgment. The discourse is generally viewed as referring both to the coming destruction of the Temple in Jerusalem, as well as the End Times and Second Coming of Christ, but the many scholarly opinions about which verses refer to which event remain divided.

A key episode in the final part of the ministry of Jesus is the Last Supper, which includes the Institution of the Eucharist. In Matthew 26:26–29, Mark 14:22–25, Luke 22:19–20 during the last supper, Jesus takes bread, breaks it and gives it to the disciples, saying, "This is my body which is given for you". He also gives them "the cup" to drink, saying this is his blood. While it may have been fermented, none of the biblical accounts refer to it as wine, but rather as "the fruit of the vine" or "the cup". In 1 Corinthians 11:23–26, Paul the Apostle refers to the Last Supper. John 14–17 concludes the Last Supper with a long, three chapter sermon known as the Farewell Discourse which prepares the disciples for the departure of Jesus.

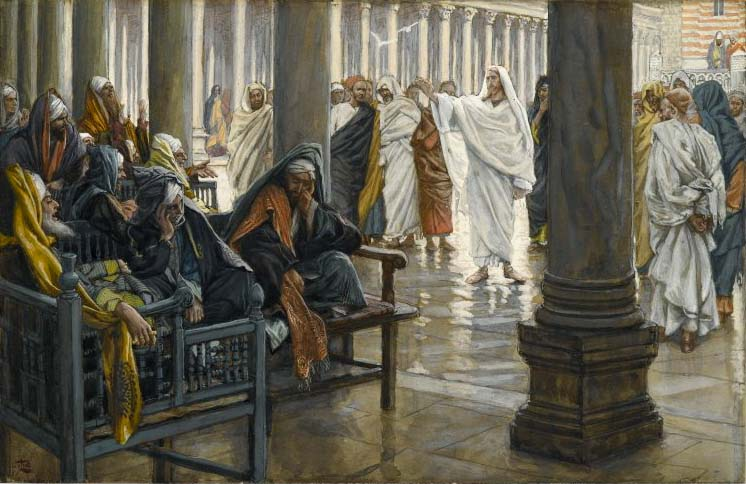
Woes of Pharisees

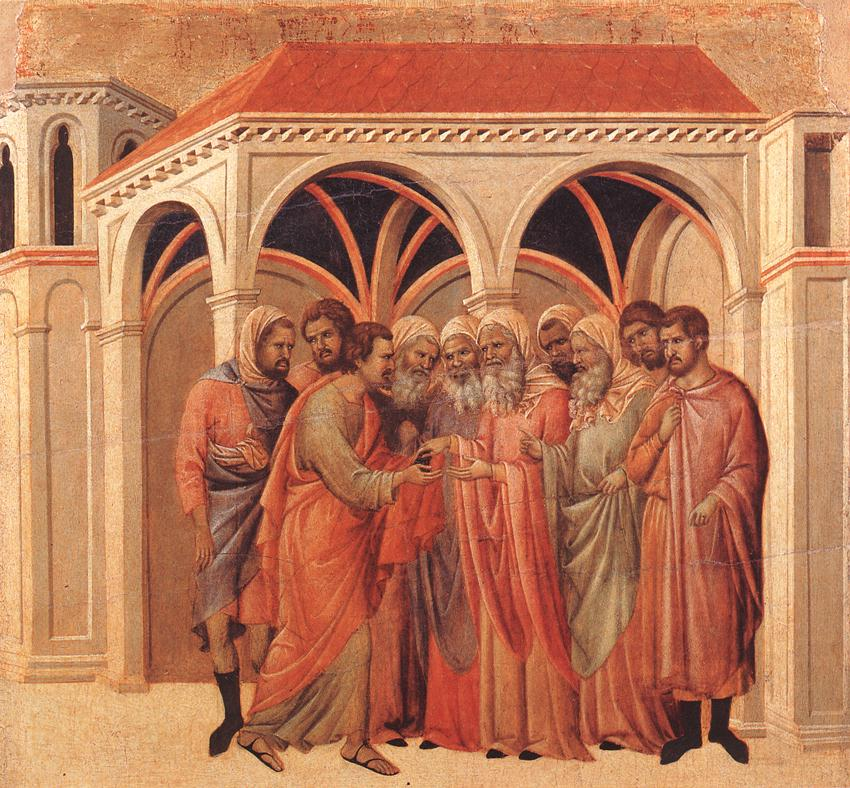
Bargain of Judas

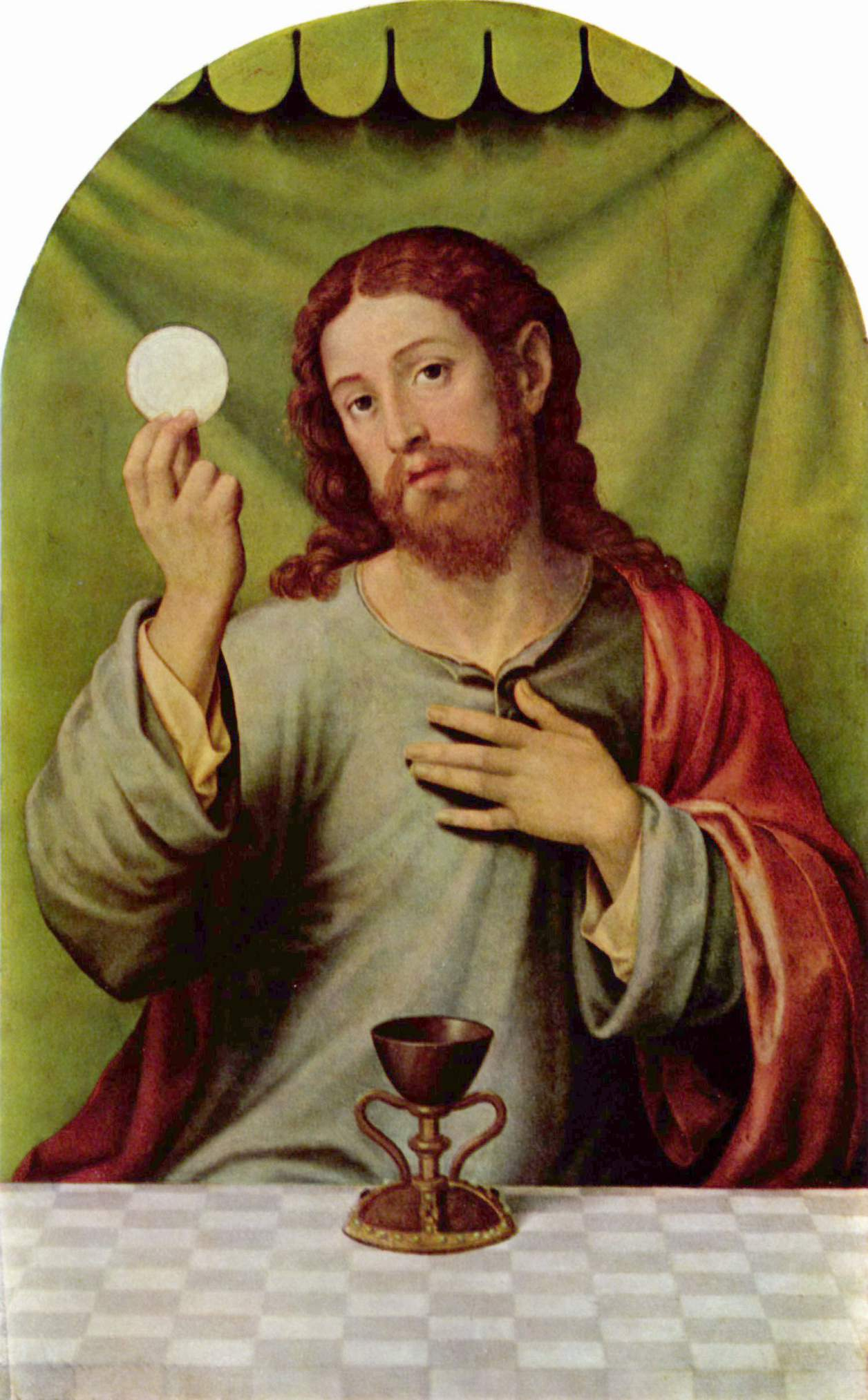
Last Supper and Eucharist

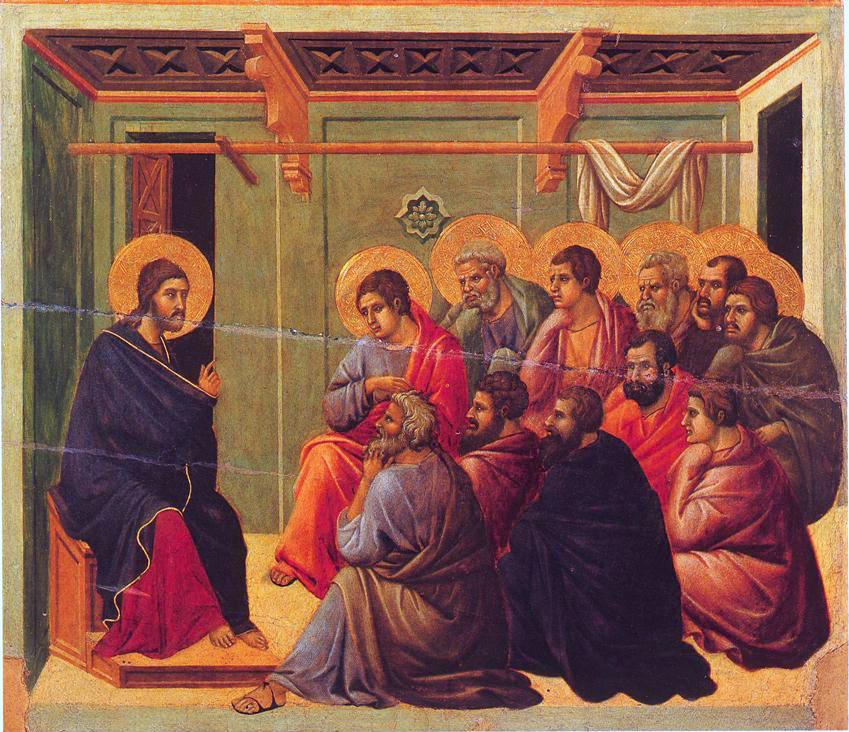
Farewell Discourse

== See also ==
Gospels and theology

- Gospel harmony
- Historical Jesus
- Jesus Seminar
- Jesus in Christianity
- Life of Christ in art
- Life of Jesus in the New Testament
- Miracles of Jesus
- Parables of Jesus

Associated places

- Al-Maghtas
- Qasr el Yahud
