= Calling of the disciples =

Biblical story from the Gospels

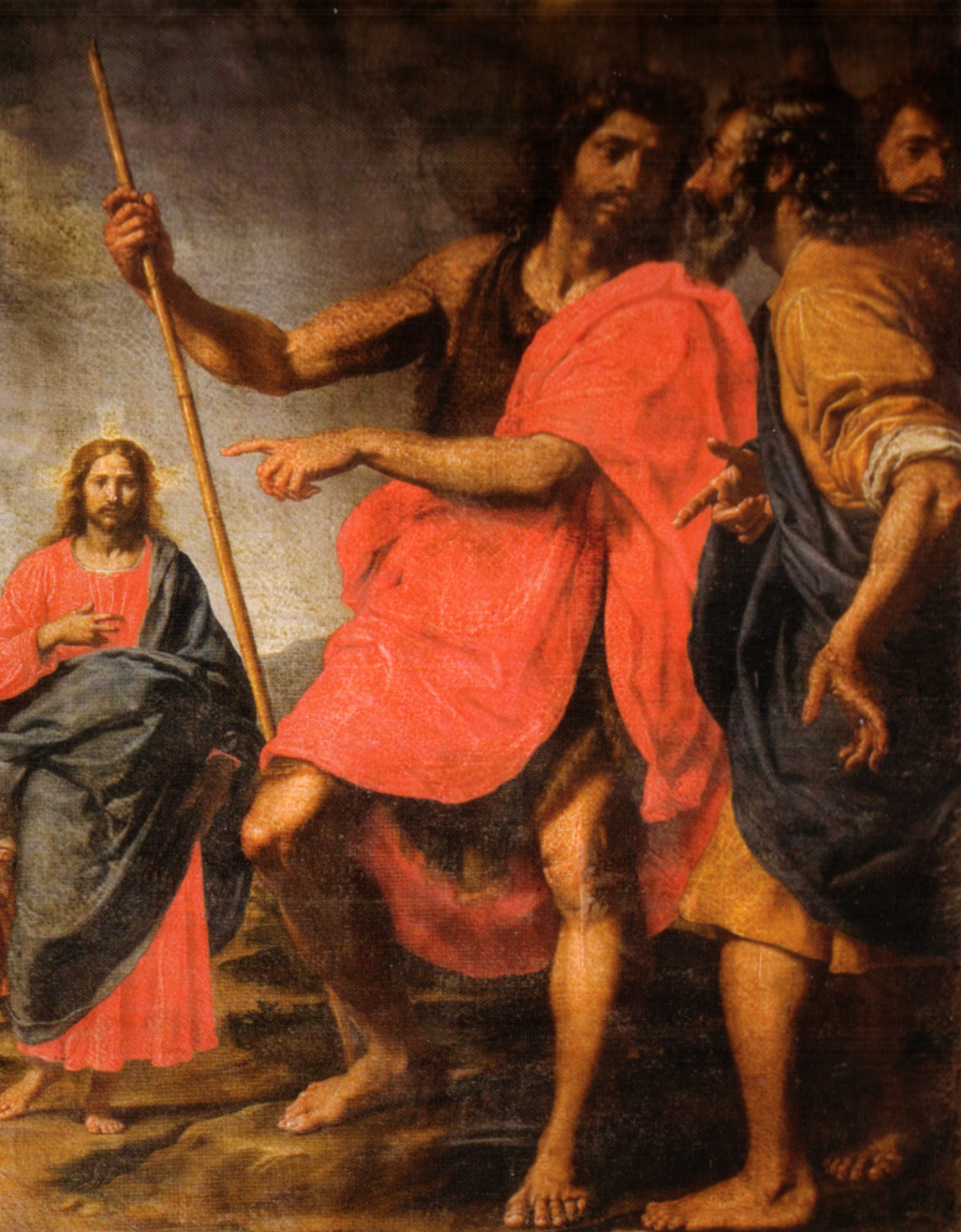
Jesus (on the left) is being identified by John the Baptist as the "Lamb of God who takes away of the sins of the world", in John 1:29. 17th century depiction by Vannini.

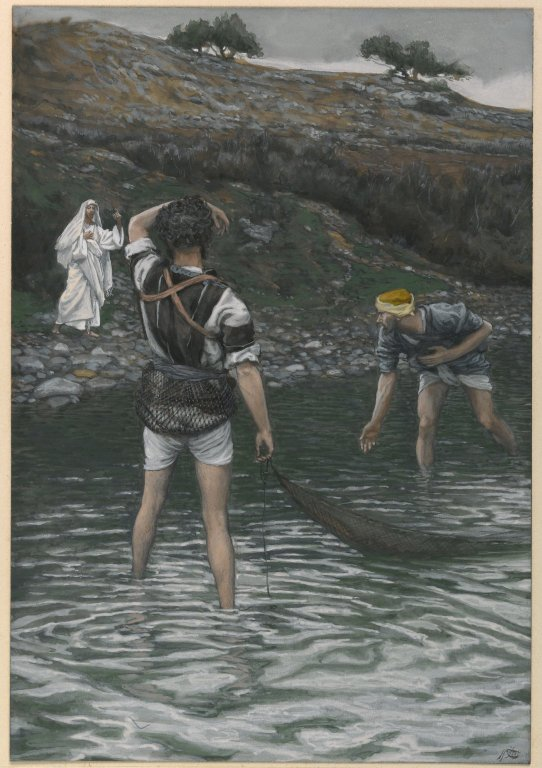
Tissot, James, The calling of Peter and Andrew.

The calling of the disciples is a key episode in the life of Jesus in the New Testament. It appears in Matthew 4:18–22, Mark 1:16-20 and Luke 5:1–11 on the Sea of Galilee. John 1:35–51 reports the first encounter with two of the disciples a little earlier in the presence of John the Baptist. Particularly in the Gospel of Mark, the beginning of the Ministry of Jesus and the call of the first disciples are inseparable.

== Gospel of John ==
In the Gospel of John the first disciples are also disciples of John the Baptist and one of them is identified as Andrew, the brother of Apostle Peter:

The next day John was there again with two of his disciples. When he saw Jesus passing by, he said, "Look, the Lamb of God!" When the two disciples heard him say this, they followed Jesus… Andrew, Simon Peter's brother, was one of the two who heard what John had said and who had followed Jesus. The first thing Andrew did was to find his brother Simon and tell him, "We have found the Messiah".

Andrew is called the Protokletos or "first-called".

The gathering of the disciples in John 1:35–51 follows the many patterns of discipleship that continue in the New Testament, in that those who have received someone else's witness become witnesses to Jesus themselves. Andrew follows Jesus because of the testimony of John the Baptist, Philip brings Nathanael and the pattern continues in John 4:4–41 where the Samaritan woman at the well testifies to the town people about Jesus.

== Gospels of Matthew and Mark ==
The Gospel of Matthew and the Gospel of Mark report the call of the first disciples by the Sea of Galilee:

As Jesus was walking beside the Sea of Galilee, he saw two brothers, called Peter and his brother Andrew. They were casting a net into the lake, for they were fishermen. "Come, follow me," Jesus said, "and I will make you fishers of men." At once they left their nets and followed him.

== Gospel of Luke ==
The Gospel of Luke reports the call by the Sea of Galilee too, but along with the first miraculous draught of fishes. In all Gospel accounts, this episode takes place after the Baptism of Jesus.

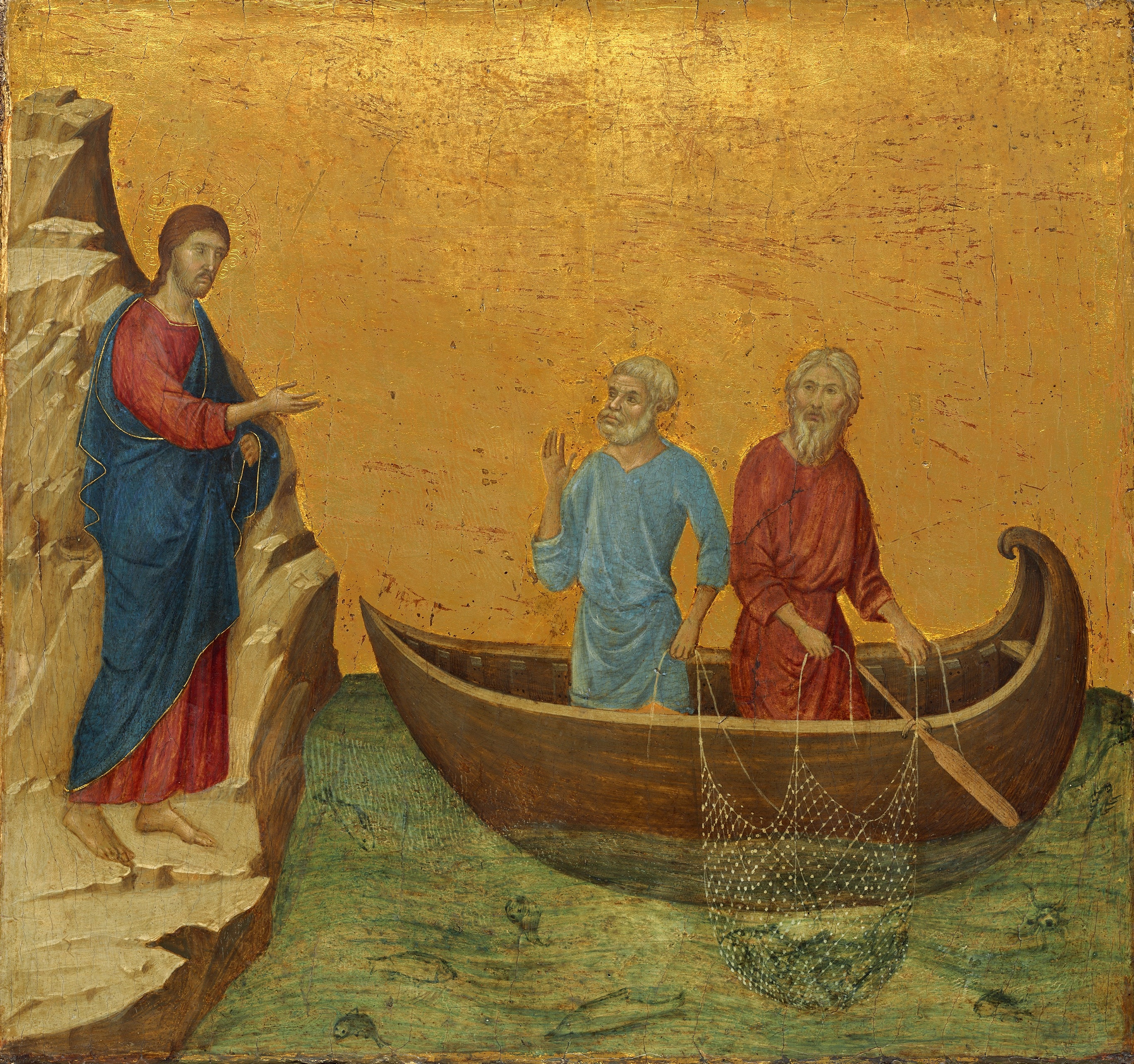
Duccio di Buoninsegna: The Calling of the Apostles Peter and Andrew

== Commentary ==
John McEvilly notes that Jesus chose His followers and representatives from among "the foolish, base, and contemptible things of this world," in order to show that the success of the Gospel was completely "the work of God, and not of man." He believes that while "walking," (Matt. 4:18) Jesus was meditating on the way he might establish and consolidate the kingdom of heaven.

Cornelius a Lapide comments on the phrase, “From now on you will catch men,” (Luke 5:10) noting that the Greek ζωγρῶν means "take them alive, catch them for life." St. Ambrose translates this verse with "make them live," as if Christ had said, “Fishermen take fishes for death, that they may kill them, but thou, O Peter, shalt catch men unto life, that they may begin a new life, and live unto God in holiness.”

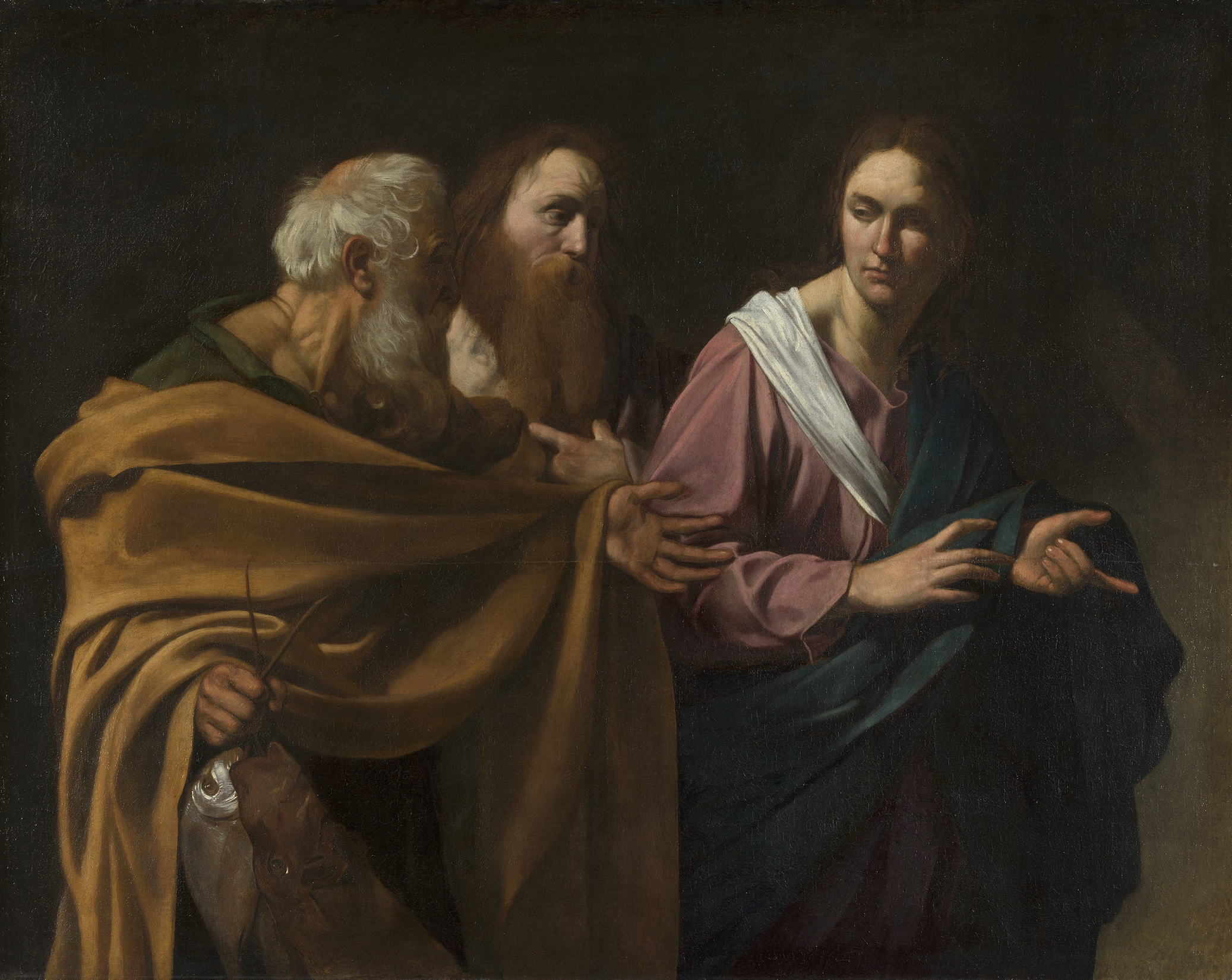
Caravaggio, The Calling of Saints Peter and Andrew

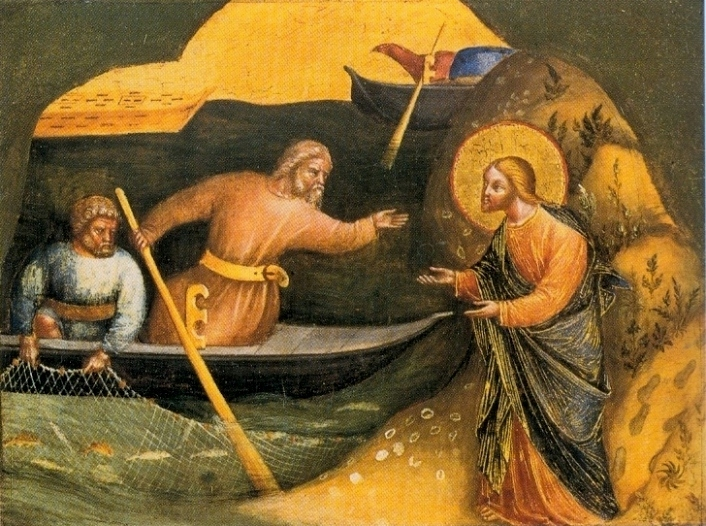
Lorenzo Veneziano, Calling of the Apostles Andrew and Peter

== See also ==
- Chronology of Jesus
- Gospel harmony
- Calling of Matthew
- Commissioning the twelve Apostles
- Life of Jesus in the New Testament
