= Zechariah 11 =

Bible chapter

- ← chapter 10 chapter 12 →
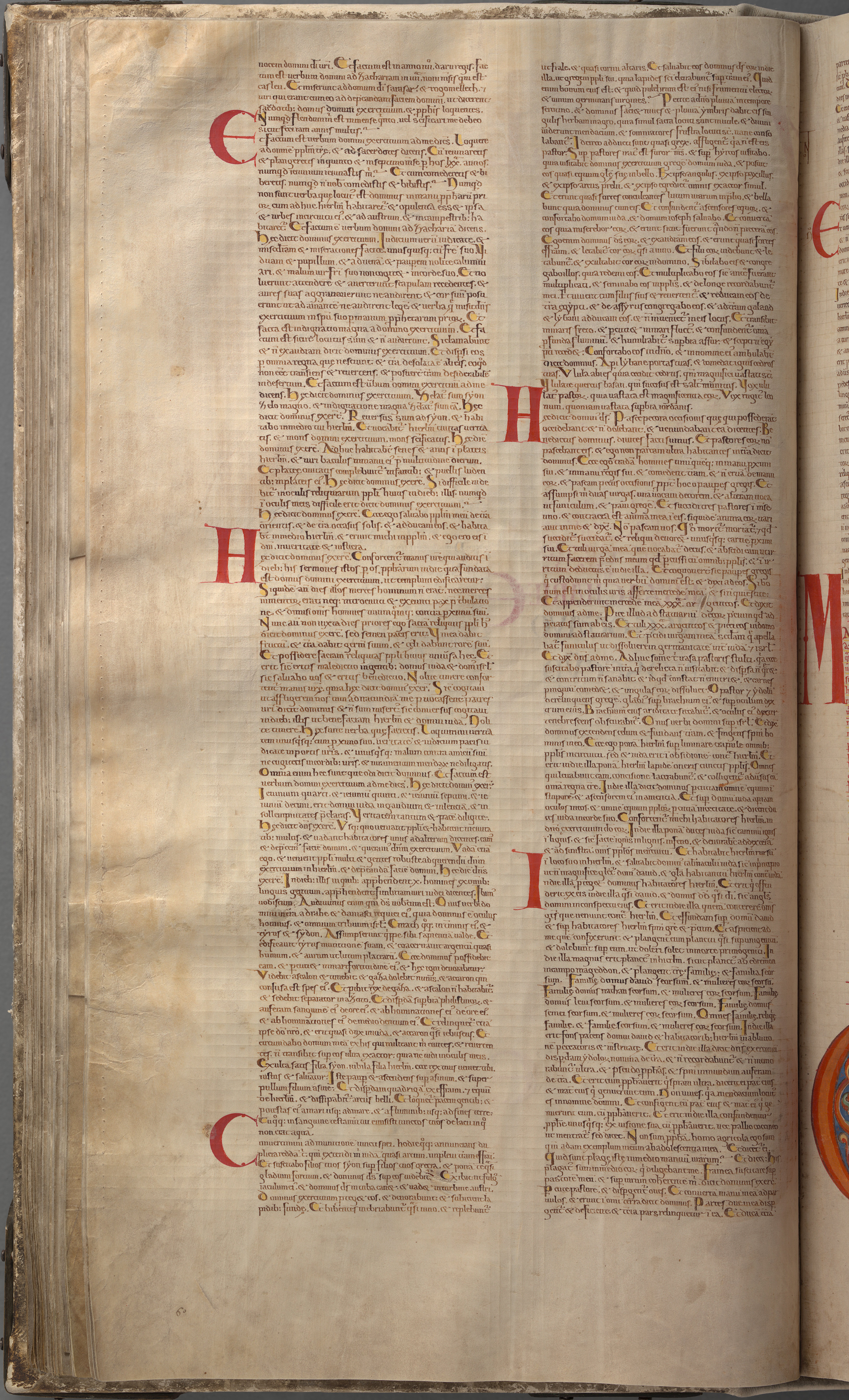
- Book of Zechariah (6:15-13:9) in Latin in Codex Gigas, made around 13th century.
- Book: Book of Zechariah
- Category: Nevi'im
- Christian Bible part: Old Testament
- Order in the Christian part: 38

Zechariah 11 is the eleventh of the 14 chapters in the Book of Zechariah in the Hebrew Bible or the Old Testament of the Christian Bible. This book contains the prophecies attributed to the prophet Zechariah. In the Hebrew Bible it is part of the Book of the Twelve Minor Prophets. This chapter is a part of a section consisting of Zechariah 9–14, attributed to the so-called "Second Zechariah", an anonymous successor to the Zechariah of chapters 1-8.

== Text ==
The original text was written in the Hebrew language. This chapter is divided into 17 verses.

=== Textual witnesses ===
Some early manuscripts containing the text of this chapter in Hebrew are of the Masoretic Text, which includes the Codex Cairensis (from year 895), the Petersburg Codex of the Prophets (916), Aleppo Codex (930), and Codex Leningradensis (1008). Fragments containing parts of this chapter were found among the Dead Sea Scrolls, that is, 4Q82 (4QXII^{g}; 50–25 BCE) with extant verses 1–2.

There is also a translation into Koine Greek known as the Septuagint, made in the last few centuries BCE. Extant ancient manuscripts of the Septuagint version include Codex Vaticanus (B; $\mathfrak{G}$^{B}; 4th century), Codex Sinaiticus (S; BHK: $\mathfrak{G}$^{S}; 4th century), Codex Alexandrinus (A; $\mathfrak{G}$^{A}; 5th century) and Codex Marchalianus (Q; $\mathfrak{G}$^{Q}; 6th century).

== Desolation of Israel (verses 1–3) ==
These verses form a taunting song against the leadership of the people, or even the temple, alluding to Jeremiah 25:36. This section is a so-called 'link passage' using the 'stitch words' 'Lebanon' (cf 10:12; 11:1) and 'shepherds' (10:3; 11:3, 4). The passage has been interpreted as a reference to the second temple after the destruction of that temple in AD 70.

=== Verse 1 ===
Open your doors, O Lebanon,

that the fire may devour your cedars!

Biblical scholar Katrina Larkin notes that both rabbinic tradition and the Dead Sea Scrolls use the word "Lebanon" to refer to the temple in Jerusalem.

== Prophecy of the Shepherds (verses 4–17) ==
In this section, verses 4–6 introduce a prophet who plays a "shepherd" and is strongly identified with YHWH, with the people of Israel as the "flock", and their leaders as "merchants". The passage alludes to Ezekiel 37:15–28, but controversially turning Ezekiel's image of unity into one of threefold disunity (verses 9, 10, 14).

=== Verse 4 ===
Thus said the Lord my God: "Become shepherd of the flock doomed to slaughter".

The implied words [said] "to me" are added in some versions.

=== Verse 12 ===
And I said unto them,
If ye think good, give me my price;

and if not, forbear.

So they weighed for my price thirty pieces of silver.

- "My price": that is, "my wages" for taking care of the "flock", which represents "people".
- "If ye think good": literally, "If it be good in your eyes." Christian writers connect this to the ministry of Jesus, who had given pastoral care to the people, speaking of himself as a "servant" to fulfill the Father's will (Philippians 2:7).
- "If not, forbear": recalls the passages in the book of Ezekiel: "Thou shalt say unto them, thus saith the Lord God, He that heareth, let him hear, and he that forbeareth, let him forbear" (Ezekiel 3:27; cf. Ezekiel 2:5, Ezekiel 2:7; Ezekiel 3:11). Elijah had also said, "If the Lord be God, follow Him; but if Baal, then follow him" (1 Kings 18:21) indicating that God will not force the free-will of men.
- "Thirty pieces of silver": is the price of a slave, gored to death by an ox (Exodus 21:32). This is connected to the bargain of Judas (Matthew 26:15), which the high priest, knowingly or unknowingly, fixed on the price of "thirty pieces of silver." Bereshit Rabba notes that this prophecy 'belongs to the Messiah'.

=== Verse 13 ===
And the Lord said to me, “Throw it to the potter”—that princely price they set on me. So I took the thirty pieces of silver and threw them into the house of the Lord for the potter.

- "Thirty pieces of silver" (NRSV: "Thirty shekels of silver"): is the price of a slave in Exodus 21:32.

This saying is attributed to Jeremiah (as a form of midrash on Jeremiah 18–19) in the New Testament (Matthew 26:15; Matthew 27:3-10).

=== Verses 15-17 ===
Verses 15–16 contain the image of an antitype to the good shepherd, echoing similar imagery found in Ezekiel 34:3–4, while verse 17 counteracts verses 15–16 with an oracle of woe against the worthless shepherd.

== See also ==
- Bashan
- Jordan
- Lebanon
- Thirty pieces of silver
- Related Bible parts: Exodus 21, Jeremiah 32, Matthew 26, Matthew 27

== Sources ==
- Boda, Mark J. (2016). Harrison, R. K.; Hubbard, Jr, Robert L. (eds.). The Book of Zechariah. New International Commentary on the Old Testament. Wm. B. Eerdmans Publishing. ISBN 978-0802823755.
- Collins, John J. (2014). Introduction to the Hebrew Scriptures. Fortress Press. ISBN 9781451469233.
- Coogan, Michael David (2007). Coogan, Michael David; Brettler, Marc Zvi; Newsom, Carol Ann; Perkins, Pheme (eds.). The New Oxford Annotated Bible with the Apocryphal/Deuterocanonical Books: New Revised Standard Version, Issue 48 (Augmented 3rd ed.). Oxford University Press. ISBN 9780195288810.
- Fitzmyer, Joseph A. (2008). A Guide to the Dead Sea Scrolls and Related Literature. Grand Rapids, MI: William B. Eerdmans Publishing Company. ISBN 9780802862419.
- Hayes, Christine (2015). Introduction to the Bible. Yale University Press. ISBN 978-0300188271.
- Larkin, Katrina J. A. (2007). "37. Zechariah". In Barton, John; Muddiman, John (eds.). The Oxford Bible Commentary (first (paperback) ed.). Oxford University Press. pp. 610–615. ISBN 978-0199277186.
- Mason, Rex (1993). "Zechariah, The Book of.". In Metzger, Bruce M; Coogan, Michael D (eds.). The Oxford Companion to the Bible. Oxford University Press. ISBN 978-0195046458.
- Rogerson, John W. (2003). "Zechariah". In Dunn, James D. G.; Rogerson, John William (eds.). Eerdmans Commentary on the Bible (illustrated ed.). Wm. B. Eerdmans Publishing. pp. 721–729. ISBN 978-0802837110.
- Ulrich, Eugene, ed. (2010). The Biblical Qumran Scrolls: Transcriptions and Textual Variants. Brill.
- Würthwein, Ernst (1995). The Text of the Old Testament. Translated by Rhodes, Erroll F. Grand Rapids, MI: Wm. B. Eerdmans. ISBN 0-8028-0788-7.
