= Matthew 27:6 =

- ← 27:5 27:7 →
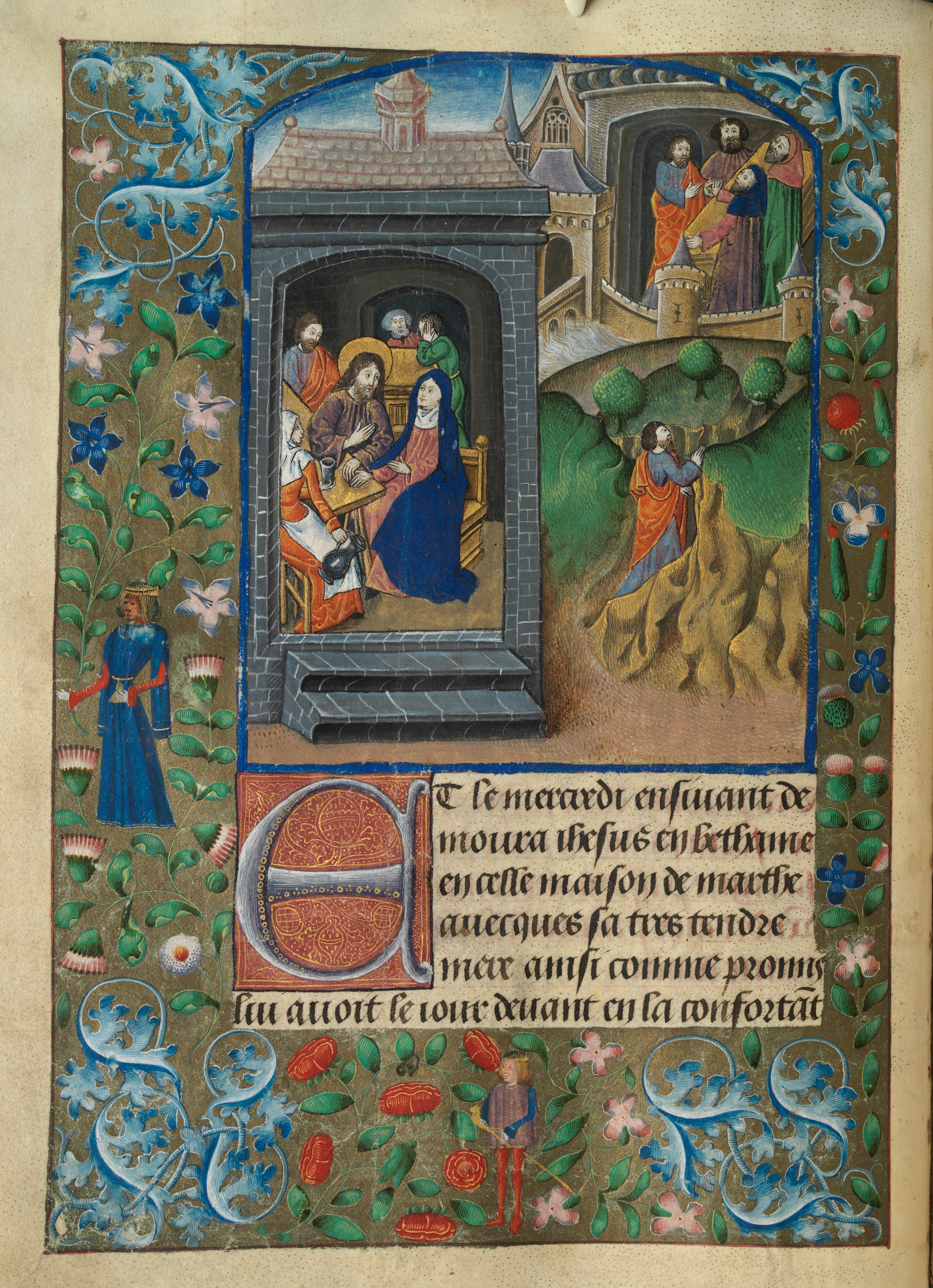
- "Vaux Passional", illumination of Christ tells his mother of what is to come; Judas on his way to the chief priest; Judas bargaining with the chief priests and receiving his silver. From circa 1503-1504 AD.
- Book: Gospel of Matthew
- Christian Bible part: New Testament

Matthew 27:6 is the sixth verse of the twenty-seventh chapter of the Gospel of Matthew in the New Testament. This verse continues the final story of Judas Iscariot. In the previous verse Judas had cast into the temple the thirty pieces of silver he'd been paid for betraying Jesus. In this verse the priests discuss what to do with them.

== Content ==
The original Koine Greek, according to Westcott and Hort, reads:

οἱ δὲ ἀρχιερεῖς λαβόντες τὰ ἀργύρια εἶπαν οὐκ ἔξεστιν
βαλεῖν αὐτὰ εἰς τὸν κορβανᾶν ἐπεὶ τιμὴ αἵματός ἐστιν

In the King James Version of the Bible it is translated as:

And the chief priests took the silver pieces, and said, It is not lawful
for to put them into the treasury, because it is the price of blood.

The modern World English Bible translates the passage as:

The chief priests took the pieces of silver, and said, "It’s not lawful
to put them into the treasury, since it is the price of blood."

For a collection of other versions see BibleHub Matthew 27:6

== Analysis ==
Unlike Judas at 27:4, the priests do not acknowledge that was "innocent blood" that the money paid for, but their actions do convey that they are aware the betrayal of Jesus was a treacherous act. This verse builds upon the theme that Jesus is innocent, and that in the Gospel of Matthew the Jewish leaders are condemning him despite also knowing his innocence. In John Calvin's commentary on Matthew he reads gross hypocrisy in the priests worrying about the impurity of the coins while conspiring to execute Jesus.

At 27:3 it was the priests and elders whom Judas was interacting with. This verse only mentions the "chief priests" this may be connected to the problem of the coins being in the temple, and those a matter for the religious leaders to resolve. It could also be linked to the specific mention of the Temple sanctuary in the previous verse, and indicate that the coins are in an area of the temple that only priests are permitted.

The law being referenced is usually taken to be Deuteronomy 23:18 (19), which specifically references the money earned from prostitution as detested by God and thus ineligible for use in the Temple, but is extrapolated to any unclean money. John Nolland disagrees, arguing that Rabbinic sources show no such interpretations of Deuteronomy.

The word κορβαναν, (korbanas), translated as treasury, appears very rarely in sources from the period. It is used nowhere else in the New Testament. Unusually in Matthew, the term seems to be a borrowing from Hebrew. Derived from the word korban. It appears in Josephus, who also uses it to refer to the Temple treasury.

Preceded by Matthew 27:5	Gospel of Matthew; Chapter 27	Succeeded by Matthew 27:7
