= Matthew 27:7 =

- ← 27:6 27:8 →
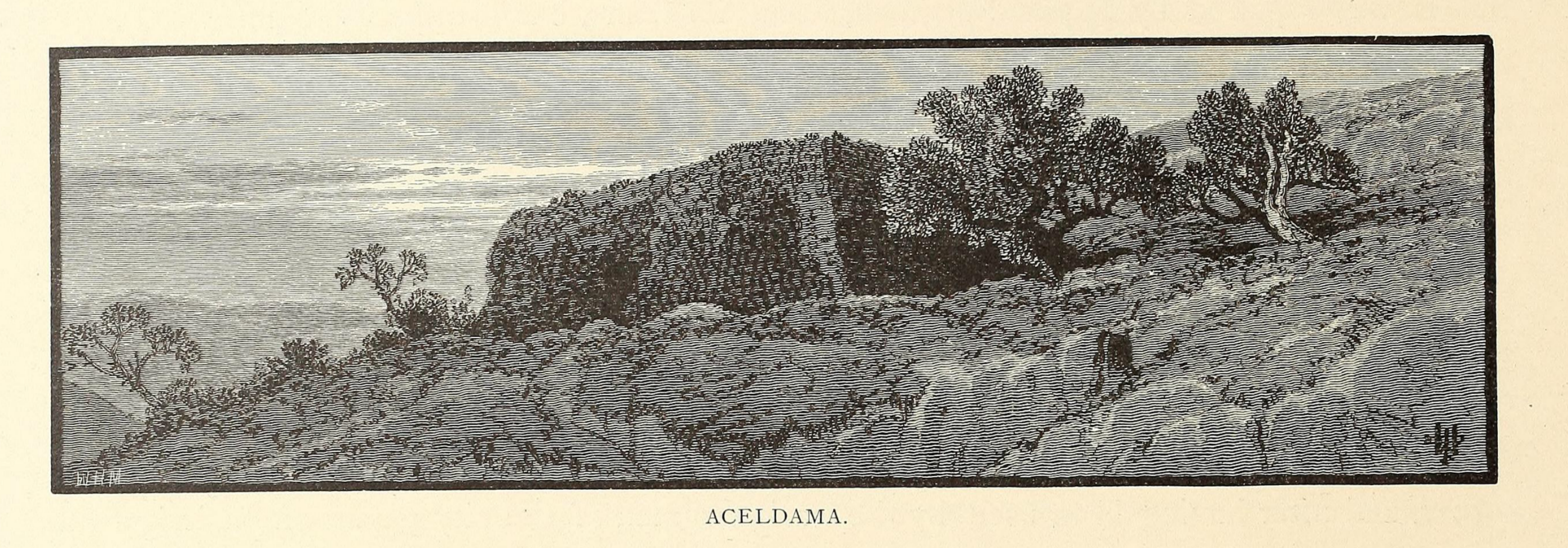
- A wood-engraving of J.D. Woodward's sketch or watercolor of the monastery at Aceldama, Akeldama, or Hakeldama: the "Field of Blood" or "Potters' Field" of Jerusalem.
- Book: Gospel of Matthew
- Christian Bible part: New Testament

Matthew 27:7 is the seventh verse of the twenty-seventh chapter of the Gospel of Matthew in the New Testament. This verse continues the final story of Judas Iscariot. In the previous verses Judas has killed himself, but not before casting the thirty pieces of silver into the Temple. In this verse the priests decide to buy a potter's field with them.

== Content ==
The original Koine Greek, according to Westcott and Hort, reads:

συμβούλιον δὲ λαβόντες ἡγόρασαν ἐξ αὐτῶν τὸν ἀγρὸν τοῦ κεραμέως εἰς ταφὴν τοῖς ξένοις

In the King James Version of the Bible it is translated as:

And they took counsel, and bought with them the potter's field, to bury strangers in.

The modern World English Bible translates the passage as:

They took counsel, and bought the potter's field with them, to bury strangers in.

For a collection of other versions see BibleHub Matthew 27:7

== Analysis ==
Burying the dead was an important religious duty, but cemeteries were ritually unclean. Using impure money to purchase land for a cemetery is thus a logical idea.

This verse is the origin of the term potter's field for a burying place for the unknown and indigent. That it is a field owned by a potter is directly linked to the quote from Zechariah that appears at 27:9 and 27:10, and is likely the result of a confused translation of the source, which more logically refers to a foundry for making coins. Matthew refers to it as the potter's field, implying that was piece of land well known by that name.

That the field is a burial place for strangers is not borrowed from Hebrew Bible sources. Some have interpreted strangers as including foreigners and gentiles. Robert Gundry translates ξένοις as aliens, and feels the verse refers specifically to Gentiles, and that a cemetery for non-Jews was a doubly impure use of the unclean money. Craig Blomberg suggests that the use of the blood money to buy a burial ground for foreigners may hint at the idea that "Jesus' death makes salvation possible for all the peoples of the world, including the Gentiles." Other scholars disagree that the cemetery is intended for Gentiles. Raymond E. Brown notes that in this era the Jewish authorities would have had no need to worry about the burying of Gentiles, the Roman authorities would have taken care of that. Brown believes that the cemetery was intended for Jews who died while visiting Jerusalem.

If the field was intended for the burial of Jews from beyond Jerusalem who died in the city, it opens the possibility that the field was imagined by the priests for the burial of either the recently deceased Judas or the soon to be Jesus, both of whom meet those criteria. While possible, there is no evidence within the Gospel, or in other traditions that this is the case.

Preceded by Matthew 27:6	Gospel of Matthew; Chapter 27	Succeeded by Matthew 27:8
