= Potter's field =

Burial place for unknown or indigent people

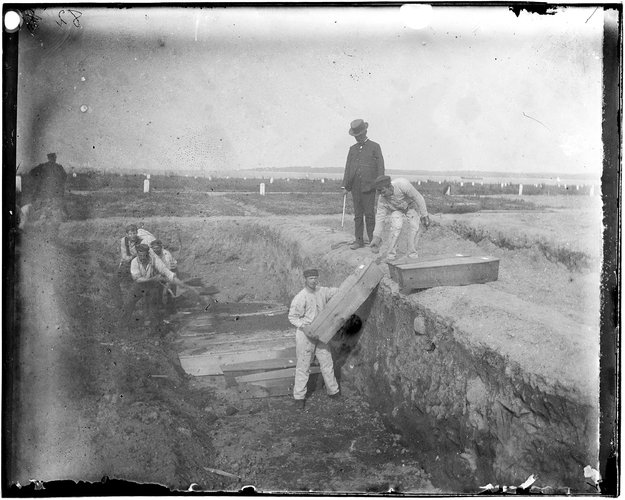
The Trench in Potter's Field on Hart Island, New York, circa 1890 by Jacob Riis

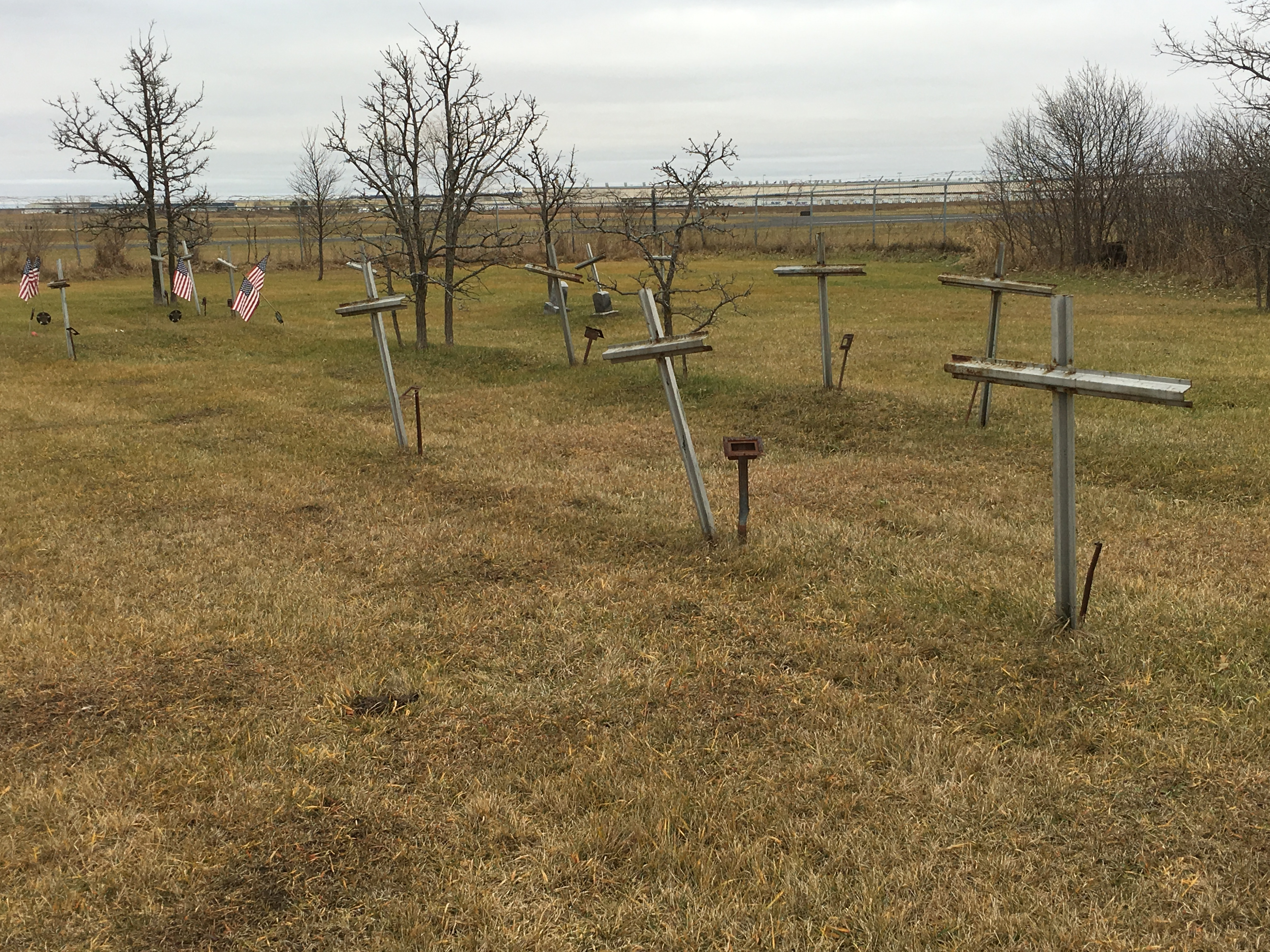
Potter's field in Dunn County, Wisconsin

A potter's field, paupers' grave or common grave is a place for the burial of unknown, unclaimed or poverty-stricken people. The term "potter's field" is of Biblical origin, and refers to Akeldama (meaning field of blood in Aramaic), which was stated to have been purchased after Judas Iscariot's suicide by the chief priests of Jerusalem with the coins that had been paid to Judas for his identification of Jesus. The priests are stated to have acquired it for the burial of strangers, criminals, and the poor, as the coins paid to Judas were considered blood money. Prior to Akeldama's use as a burial ground, it had been a site where potters collected high-quality, deeply red clay for the production of ceramics, thus the name potters' field.

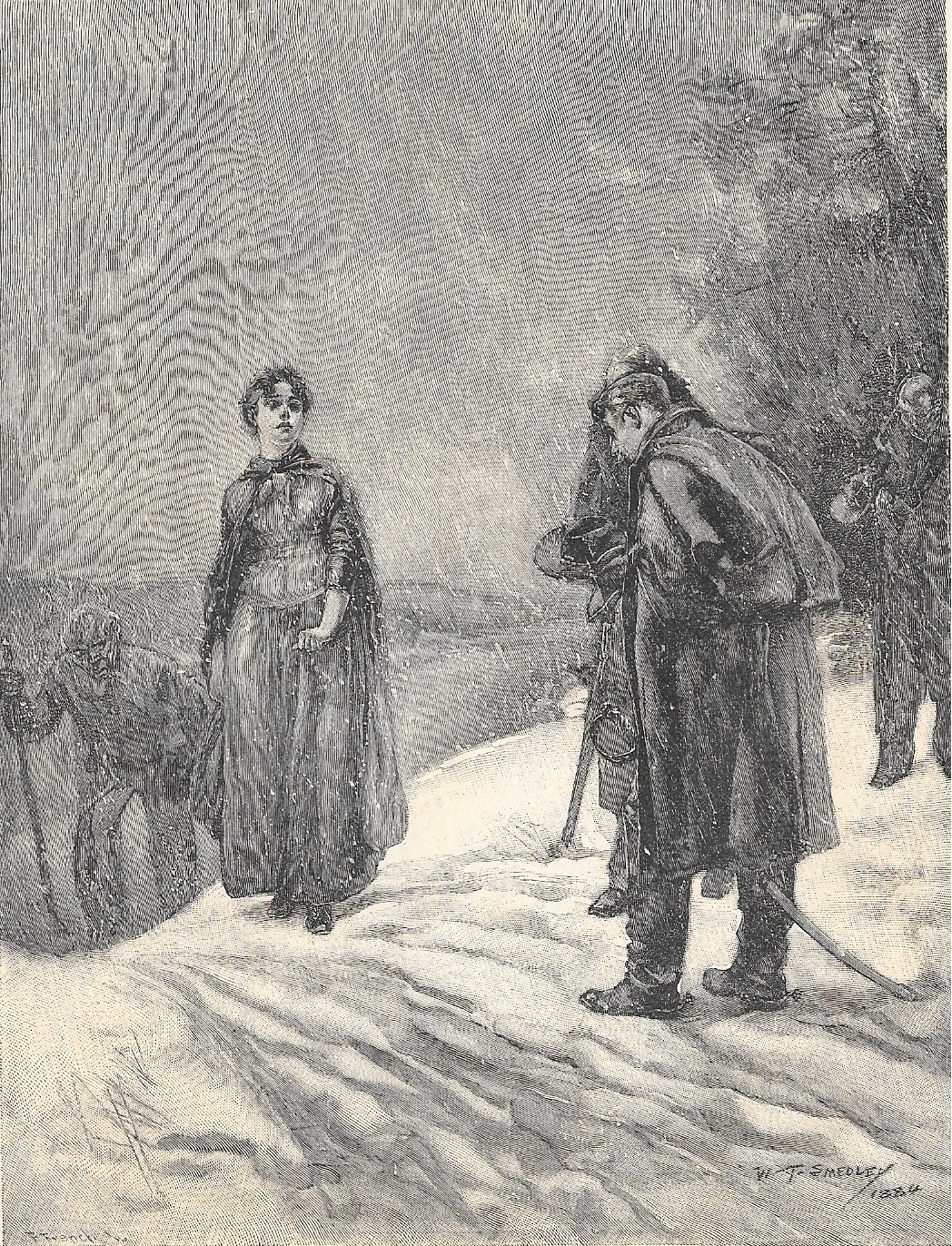
"I come to claim my dead" drawing by William Thomas Smedley, circa 1884

== Purpose ==
Potter's field is a term of Biblical origin referring to a place dedicated for the burial of the bodies of unknown, unclaimed or indigent people. In addition to such dedicated cemeteries, most places have provision for pauper's funerals to pay for basic respectful treatment of dead people without family or others able to pay, without a special place for interment.

== Origin ==
The term "potter's field" comes from Matthew 27:3–27:8 in the New Testament of the Bible, in which Jewish priests take 30 pieces of silver returned by a remorseful Judas:

Then Judas, who betrayed him, seeing that he was condemned, repenting himself, brought back the thirty pieces of silver to the chief priests and ancients, saying: "I have sinned in betraying innocent blood." But they said: "What is that to us? Look thou to it." And casting down the pieces of silver in the temple, he departed, and went and hanged himself with a halter. But the chief priests, having taken the pieces of silver, said: "It is not lawful to put them into the corbona, because it is the price of blood." And after they had consulted together, they bought with them the potter's field, to be a burying place for strangers. For this the field was called Haceldama, that is, the field of blood, even to this day. — Douay–Rheims Bible

The site referred to in these verses is traditionally known as Akeldama, in the valley of Hinnom, which was a source of potters' clay. After the clay was removed, such a site would be left unusable for agriculture, being full of trenches and holes, thus becoming a graveyard for those who could not be buried in an orthodox cemetery.

The author of Matthew was drawing on earlier Biblical references to potters' fields. The passage continues, with verses 9 and 10:

Then what the prophet Jeremiah had said came true: "They took the thirty silver coins, the amount the people of Israel had agreed to pay for him, and used the money to buy the potter's field, as the Lord had commanded me."

This is based on a quotation from Zechariah (Zechariah 11:12–13). However, Matthew attributes the quote to Jeremiah. The author of Matthew may have been mistaken. There are two other possible reasons for the reference. First, Jeremiah also speaks of buying a field, in Jeremiah 32:6–15. That field is a symbol of hope, not despair as mentioned in Matthew, and the price is 17 pieces of silver. The author of Matthew could have combined the words of Zechariah and Jeremiah, while only citing the "major" prophet. Secondly, "Jeremiah" was sometimes used to refer to the Books of the Prophets in toto as "The Law" is sometimes used to refer to Moses' five books – Genesis through Deuteronomy, the Pentateuch.

Craig Blomberg suggests that the use of the blood money to buy a burial ground for foreigners in Matthew 27:7 may hint at the idea that "Jesus' death makes salvation possible for all the peoples of the world, including the Gentiles." Other scholars do not read the verse as referring to Gentiles, but rather to Jews who are not native to Jerusalem.

== Examples ==
- Blue Plains, in the Anacostia area of Washington, D.C., contains remains of executed international spies including Nazi spies from Operation Pastorius.
- Eloise Cemetery in Westland, Michigan, was used by the Eloise hospital complex; some 7,000 people were buried there between 1894 and 1948.
- Golden Gate Cemetery in San Francisco, California, was used from 1870 to 1909, with some 29,000 burials in sections, one of which was a potter's field.
- Hart Island in the Bronx is New York City's current potter's field and one of the largest cemeteries in the United States, with at least 800,000 burials.
- Holt Cemetery in New Orleans contains the remains of known and unknown early jazz musicians, including Charles "Buddy" Bolden. The battered remains of Robert Charles, at the center of the 1900 New Orleans race riot were briefly interred there, then dug up and incinerated.
- Hudson County Burial Grounds in Secaucus, New Jersey.
- Kings County Cemetery or Kings County Farm Cemetery, Brooklyn, New York City.
- Lincoln Park, on Chicago's North Side, found its origin in the 1840s as Chicago City Cemetery. The southernmost portion of the cemetery, where one may now find a number of baseball fields (north of LaSalle Dr., west of North Avenue Beach), was the location of the City Cemetery potter's field from 1843 to 1871. More than 15,000 people, including 4,000 Confederate soldiers, were buried here on marshy land near the water's edge. The baseball fields have occupied these grounds since 1877.
- Madison Square Park, Washington Square Park and Bryant Park in New York City originated as potter's fields.
- Music Hall in Cincinnati, Ohio was built over a 19th-century potter's field.
- Potter's Field (Omaha) in Omaha, Nebraska
- Queen Lane Apartments. Work on the project was delayed by the discovery of a potter's field on an adjacent plot.
- Shockoe Hill African Burying Ground in Richmond, Virginia, came to be labeled as Potter's Field on maps in the 1870s. It was/is likely the largest burial ground for free people of color and the enslaved in the United States. The number of estimated interments made between 1816 and 1879 is upwards of 22,000.
- Strangers' Burying Ground, Toronto open from 1826 to 1855 with total 6,685 burials.
- Washington Park (Albany) was the site of the State Street Burying Grounds, a municipal cemetery which included a potter's field. Some maps identify the section as the "strangers" burial ground.
- Washington Square (Philadelphia)
- Puticuli, an ancient Roman mass grave for poor people and waste.
- The Green Bay, WI Potter's Field was neglected and forgotten until 2014, when VFW Post 9677 launched a fundraising campaign, spruced up the area, and identified many of the 296 people buried there from 1853 to 1973. The City Public Works now maintains the property.
- Harris County Cemetery in Houston
- Harris County Eastgate Cemetery in unincorporated Harris County, near the Crosby census-designated place and with a Crosby mailing address.

== See also ==
- Boot Hill
- Mass grave
