= Matthew 27:5 =

- ← 27:4 27:6 →
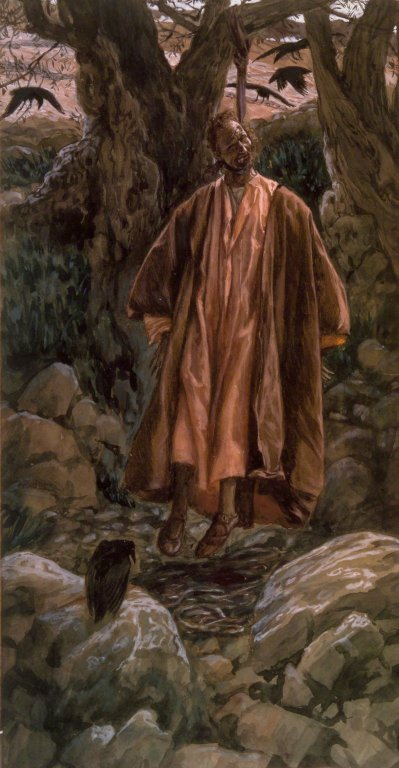
- Judas Hangs Himself by James Tissot
- Book: Gospel of Matthew
- Christian Bible part: New Testament

Matthew 27:5 is the fifth verse of the twenty-seventh chapter of the Gospel of Matthew in the New Testament. This verse continues the final story of Judas Iscariot. In the earlier verse Judas had regretted his decision to betray Jesus, but is met with disinterest from the Jewish leaders. In this verse his response is to return the blood money and then commit suicide.

== Content ==
The original Koine Greek reads:

καὶ ῥίψας τὰ ἀργύρια εἰς τὸν ναὸν ἀνεχώρησεν, καὶ ἀπελθὼν ἀπήγξατο.

In the King James Version of the Bible it is translated as:

And he cast down the pieces of silver in the temple, and departed, and went and hanged himself.

The modern World English Bible translates the passage as:

He threw down the pieces of silver in the sanctuary, and departed. He went away and hanged himself.

For a collection of other versions see BibleHub Matthew 27:5

== Analysis ==
This verse, like the others in the death of Judas section, has no direct parallel in the other gospels. This verse is likely influenced by Zechariah 11:12–13 in the Hebrew Bible that has money being thrown into the potter of the temple. Another parallel is 2 Samuel 17:23 where Ahithophel hangs himself after betraying David. It does not match the death of Judas described in Acts, where he perishes of disease.

The suicide of Judas in this verse is one of the central texts in the later Christian view of suicide as a great sin. Suicide becomes closely linked to the sin of Judas's betrayal. Jewish law of the period had no such moral prohibition of suicide, and killing oneself after repenting evil acts was at times praised in Jewish literature of the period. Such a positive view of suicide was also widespread in Greco-Roman morality.

There has long been a debate as to the exact nature of Judas in the gospels. Davies and Allison, and Nolland feels that Matthew's narrative is one of a repentant Judas whose suicide is not described as an evil act, but one of contrition. Other scholars disagree. Keener argues that even to the Romans, the context of Judas' suicide was deeply dishonourable.

The translation of τον ναον is debated. It can be read as the coin being thrown "into the temple", "in the temple", or "into the sanctuary." The inner sanctuary translation is the most literal, and is how Matthew usually interprets τον ναον. It is also the most problematic. The inner sanctuary of the temple was a secure area where only priests were permitted, to which Judas would not have had access. Some early manuscripts address this problem by changing this verse to specify that it is the temple, not the sanctuary where the coins are going, but the earliest sources agree that τον ναον was the term the author of Matthew used. While the author of Matthew would have been aware of the rules surrounding the Temple sanctuary, he may be using the term to emphasize the defilement with the blood money corrupting the holy place and presaging the destruction of the Temple itself. Gundry feels the wording is a specific reference to Zechariah, and does not have implications beyond that.

Another view is that while τον ναον literally meant the sanctuary, it was also an accepted term for the temple itself and the temple complex. The temple was home to the treasury, and Judas' act may be interpreted as returning the coins to where they came from, in the parallel verse in Zechariah the coins are returned to the "potter", usually understood to be a term for a foundry where coins would be made.

== See also ==
- Christian views on suicide
- Judas Tree

Preceded by Matthew 27:4	Gospel of Matthew; Chapter 27	Succeeded by Matthew 27:6
