= Matthew 27:12 =

Matthew 27:12 is the twelfth verse of the twenty-seventh chapter of the Gospel of Matthew in the New Testament. This continues Pilate's Court, and the final trial of Jesus.

== Content ==
The original Koine Greek, according to Westcott and Hort, reads:

και εν τω κατηγορεισθαι αυτον υπο των αρχιερεων και πρεσβυτερων ουδεν απεκρινατο

In the King James Version of the Bible it is translated as:

And when he was accused of the chief priests and elders, he answered nothing.

The modern World English Bible translates the passage as:

When he was accused by the chief priests and elders, he answered nothing.

For a collection of other versions see BibleHub Matthew 27:12.

== Analysis ==
This verse is similar to Mark 15:3 with several variations. Matthew mentions elders along with the chief priests. Mark specifies that they accused Jesus of "many things," whereas Matthew gives no extra details on what Jesus was accused of. Most notably Mark makes no mention of any reply by Jesus, and Jesus' silence could be presumed, but Matthew makes it explicit that Jesus says nothing when confronted. Luke also has a version of this exchange at Luke 23:2, which lists several specific charges made by the priests.

The silence of Jesus when faced with the accusations have been linked by many scholars to the Suffering Servant of Isaiah (fulfilling Isaiah 53:7), and more generally to Jesus' philosophy of meekness. Roman judicial system relies on the defense response to judge, so 'if Jesus had said nothing at all, Pilate would be bound to condemn him', but Jesus has spoken in verse 11 and no more, as he is surrounded by unbelief and knows that 'the hour has come' (verse 14).

== See also ==
- High Priest of Israel
- Related Bible parts: Isaiah 53, Mark 15, Luke 23

Preceded by Matthew 27:11	Gospel of Matthew; Chapter 27	Succeeded by Matthew 27:13
