= Matthew 27:9–10 =

Matthew 27:9-10 are the ninth and tenth verses of the twenty-seventh chapter of the Gospel of Matthew in the New Testament. These verses end the final story of Judas Iscariot, with a quotation from scripture showing how the events around his final days were predicted.

== Content ==
The original Koine Greek, according to Westcott and Hort, reads:

9 τοτε επληρωθη το ρηθεν δια ιερεμιου του προφητου λεγοντος και ελαβον τα
τριακοντα αργυρια την τιμην του τετιμημενου ον ετιμησαντο απο υιων ισραηλ
10 και εδωκαν αυτα εις τον αγρον του κεραμεως καθα συνεταξεν μοι κυριος

In the King James Version of the Bible it is translated as:

9 Then was fulfilled that which was spoken by Jeremy the prophet,
saying, And they took the thirty pieces of silver, the price of him
that was valued, whom they of the children of Israel did value;
10 And gave them for the potter's field, as the Lord appointed me.

The modern World English Bible translates the passage as:

9 Then that which was spoken through Jeremiah the prophet was fulfilled, saying,
"They took the thirty pieces of silver, the price of him upon whom a price had
been set, whom some of the children of Israel priced,
10 and they gave them for the potter’s field, as the Lord commanded me."

For a collection of other versions see BibleHub Matthew 27:9-10.

== Analysis ==
This is the last of many references in the Gospel of Matthew to the Hebrew Bible. It is introduced using a standard Matthean opening. The introduction of this verse exactly matches that of the other reference to Jeremiah at Matthew 2:17.

Like many of the Hebrew Bible quotations in Matthew, the author has liberally reworked these verses from the source material. The verse nowhere exactly matches any Old Testament text, but the closest is Zechariah 11:13. The World English Bible's translation of this verse is:

13 Yahweh said to me, "Throw it to the potter, the handsome price
that I was valued at by them!" I took the thirty pieces of silver,
and threw them to the potter, in Yahweh’s house.

One immediate complication with this verse is that if it is quoting Zechariah, why does the author attribute it to Jeremiah? This misattribution has been noted since the earliest days of Christianity, and a number of explanations have been given. Many scholars, including Augustine and Jerome, have accepted that this was simply a mistake on the part of the writer. John Calvin, Carl Friedrich Keil and Heinrich Meyer think that such a slip of the memory "might readily enough occur through a reminiscence of Jeremiah 18:2", where Jeremiah is sent to the potter's house.

Eusebius argued that the verse originally referred to Zechariah, and a scribe erroneously substituted one prophet for the other. Some early copies of the Gospel do omit the name Jeremiah, but the earliest versions all have Jeremiah, and the evidence is overwhelming that that is the original version. The other editions are later scribes noticing the problem and trying to correct it. It may be that the reference to Jeremiah, the first book in the division of Jewish scripture known as the Prophets, was intended as a reference to the whole; in Luke 24:44 Jesus similarly refers to the collection of books known as the Writings by the title of the first book in that division, the Psalms, and the failure to attribute quotes to Zechariah in the four other New Testament verses where that book is quoted (Matt. 21:4-5; 26:31; John 12:12-15; 19:37) lends some support to this explanation. Other arguments to preserve Biblical inerrancy are that Jeremiah was a shorthand to refer to any of the prophets; that as a prophecy of doom it was a Jeremiah type prophecy, and that was what is being indicated; or that the verse is not referring to Zechariah 11:13, but rather to a work of Jeremiah that is now lost. There are several ancient documents that claim to be that lost work of Jeremiah, but all date to some centuries later, and show clear Christian influence. They are themselves based on Matthew 27:9-10 rather than the reverse.

A more complex theory is that this verse is drawing on material from both Jeremiah and Zechariah, but only attributes it to the former. The Oxford Annotated Bible states that the text in Zechariah 11:12-13 "form a Midrash on Jeremiah 18–19". There are some links to Jeremiah in these verses. The prophet buys a field in Jeremiah 32 and visits a potter at Jeremiah 18:2. Some scholars argue that the author of Matthew seems to have been drawing on both Zechariah and Jeremiah, with certain words and phrases drawn from the LXX version of Jeremiah. Raymond E. Brown and Davies and Allison both accept this theory. Robert H. Gundry disagrees. To him the verses at Jeremiah 18 and 32 have no relation to each other, and only a tenuous links to these verses.

J. B. Lightfoot suggests that by "Jeremiah", the author intended to indicate the whole of the prophetic literature.

The apocryphal work known as the Rest of the Words of Baruch, also called the Ethiopic Lamentations of Jeremiah contains a quotation of one of Jeremiah's prophecies against Pashhur that matches up exactly with Matthew's quotation. This text appears to have been referenced by Jerome, who stated that he saw this prophecy "in a Hebrew book, which a Hebrew of the Nazarene sect showed me, an apocryph of Jeremiah in which I found this, word for word". However, skeptics of this theory have speculated that this text was written after Matthew as a way to explain Matthew's quotation.

== Bibliography ==
- Brown, Raymond (Dec 1, 1998). The Death of the Messiah. Yale University Press.

Preceded by Matthew 27:8	Gospel of Matthew; Chapter 27	Succeeded by Matthew 27:11
