= Matthew 27:11 =

- ← 27:10 27:12 →
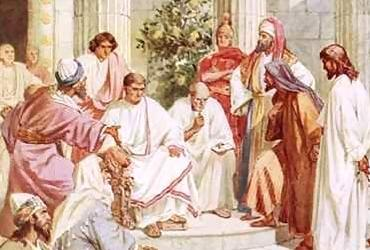
- "Jesus and Pilate" by William Hole.
- Book: Gospel of Matthew
- Christian Bible part: New Testament

Matthew 27:11 is the eleventh verse of the twenty-seventh chapter of the Gospel of Matthew in the New Testament. This verse brings the narrative back to Pilate's Court, and the final trial of Jesus.

== Content ==
The original Koine Greek, according to Westcott and Hort, reads:

ο δε ιησους εσταθη εμπροσθεν του ηγεμονος και επηρωτησεν αυτον ο
ηγεμων λεγων συ ει ο βασιλευς των ιουδαιων ο δε ιησους εφη συ λεγεις

In the King James Version of the Bible it is translated as:

And Jesus stood before the governor: and the governor asked him, saying,
Art thou the King of the Jews? And Jesus said unto him, Thou sayest.

The modern World English Bible translates the passage as:

Now Jesus stood before the governor: and the governor asked him, saying,
"Are you the King of the Jews?" Jesus said to him, "So you say." (Note: For a collection of other versions see BibleHub Matthew 27:11.)

== Analysis ==
After the last verses describing the fate of Judas Iscariot, this verse returns to paralleling the passion narrative in other Gospels. The opening of the verse is unique to Matthew, resetting the narrative to the trial before Pilate.

The following exchange between Jesus and Pilate is a rare item found in all four Gospels; with variations it is also at Mark 15:2, Luke 23:3, and John 18:31-37.

This second interrogation closely parallels that of the first trial before the Sanhedrin in Matthew 26; the text implies that the Jewish leaders have briefed Pilate on the accusations they have against Jesus, and here he tests them himself.

This is the second time in Matthew a Gentile has referred to Jesus as "King of the Jews." The previous time was the Magi from the East doing so at Matthew 2:2. However, nowhere else in Matthew, or the other Gospels has Jesus been referred to as "King of the Jews" prior to the trial. The Gospel nowhere explains how this title became known and so central to the trial. In several places Jesus refers to "the kingdom" and the "kingdom of David" and that he would have a special role in this kingdom to come, so him being a king is not far removed from those notions. The nature of the title may be Gentile itself, with Jewish followers referring to Jesus as Christ rather than king and as representing Israel not the Jews. The title is also the one that would seem to be the most serious threat to the Romans. In later decades the Romans would forcibly suppress a number of religious movements, such as that of Theudas, but the era of Jesus was a largely peaceful one and there is no evidence of any such actions by Roman authorities in this period. Thus Pilate may not have been much concerned by someone calling himself a christ or messiah, but proclaiming oneself as King, and thus a rival to the emperor, would have been a greater concern.

Jesus' response to Pilate is ambiguous. Various later scholars have interpreted it as an agreement with Pilate, a denial of the charge, and a response that does not commit either way. While others refer to Jesus with a series of titles, nowhere in Matthew does he refer to himself as messiah or king, so a direct yes in response the question would have been out of character. Narratively the ambiguous reply does nothing to deny Jesus' messianic nature, but also does not have him admit the charges against him are correct, and thus the unjust nature of his execution is also maintained.

== Notes ==
Preceded by Matthew 27:10	Gospel of Matthew; Chapter 27	Succeeded by Matthew 27:12
