= Matthew 27:4 =

- ← 27:3 27:5 →
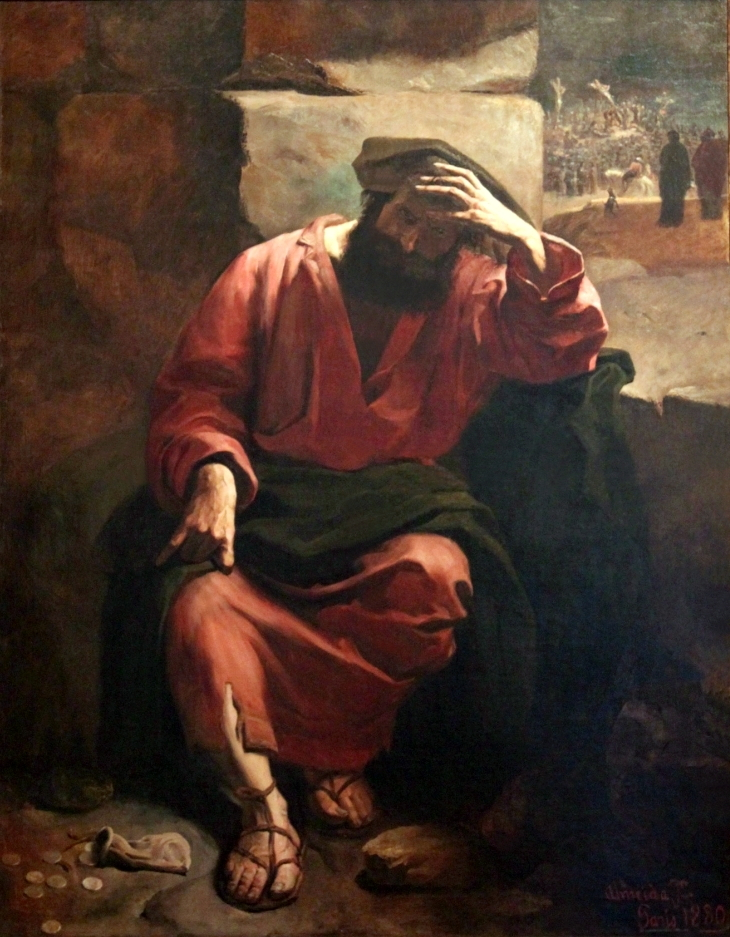
- Almeida Júnior's 1880 depiction of the remorseful Judas
- Book: Gospel of Matthew
- Christian Bible part: New Testament

Matthew 27:4 is the fourth verse of the twenty-seventh chapter of the Gospel of Matthew in the New Testament. This verse continues the final story of Judas Iscariot. In the previous verse, Judas had regretted his decision to betray Jesus. In this verse he returns to the Jewish leaders but finds no interest in his change of opinion.

== Content ==
The original Koine Greek, according to Westcott and Hort, reads:

λέγων ἥμαρτον παραδοὺς αἷμα δίκαιον
οἱ δὲ εἶπαν τί πρὸς ἡμᾶς σὺ ὄψῃ

In the King James Version of the Bible it is translated as:

Saying, I have sinned in that I have betrayed the innocent
blood. And they said, What is that to us? see thou to that.

The modern World English Bible translates the passage as:

saying, "I have sinned in that I betrayed innocent blood.”
But they said, "What is that to us? You see to it."

For a collection of other versions see BibleHub Matthew 27:4

== Analysis ==
Like the other verses in this section of Matthew, there is no parallel in the other gospels. This is the only time the term innocent blood occurs in the New Testament, but the Septuagint has many occurrences of it in the Hebrew Bible, to which the author of Matthew may have been referring: Deuteronomy 27:25 curses anyone who takes a bribe to shed innocent blood. and 1 Samuel 19:5 has Jonathan argue that the killing of David is a sin for shedding innocent blood.

With the main witness recanting, the law of the time called for a new trial for Jesus and for one of Judas for presenting false evidence. The Jewish leaders are presented as having no interest in this path.

The dialogue in this verse is typical of the Gospel of Matthew, which often employs direct speech where other gospel writers do not. Both of the replies from the priests and elders are expressions for expressing disinterest. The phrase τι προς ημας more directly translates as "what to us". The same phrase is used twice in the Gospel of John and also in other period literature.

Judas believes that he has sinned. The word ημαρτον is not found in Mark, but appears twice in Matthew at 18:15 and 18:21. The word ημαρτον also appears in Luke in his version of those same passages.

== Sources ==
- Senior, Donald P. (1975). The Passion of Jesus in the Gospel of Matthew. Leuven University Press.

Preceded by Matthew 27:3	Gospel of Matthew; Chapter 27	Succeeded by Matthew 27:5
