= Matthew 27:1 =

- ← 26:75 27:2 →
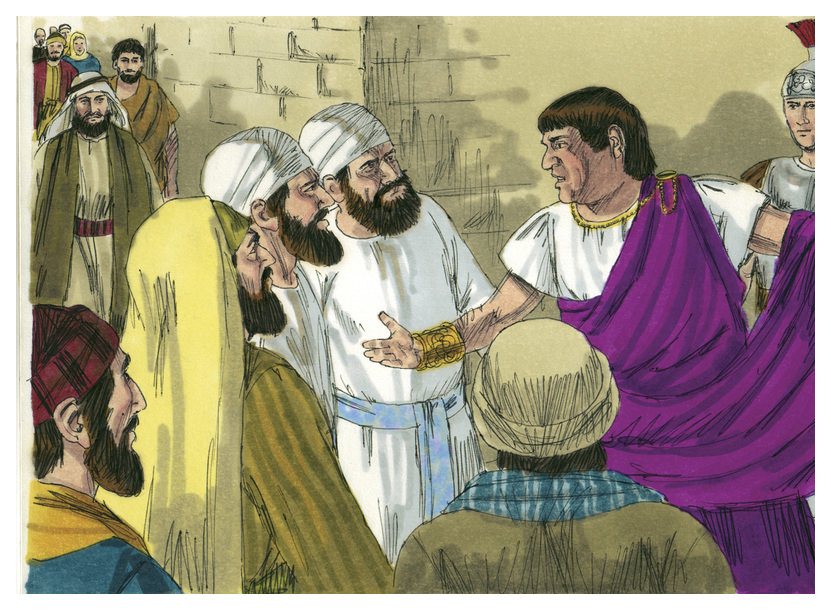
- "The chief priests and elders of the people before Pontius Pilate". Biblical illustrations by Jim Padgett
- Book: Gospel of Matthew
- Christian Bible part: New Testament

Matthew 27:1 is the first verse of the twenty-seventh chapter of the Gospel of Matthew in the New Testament. This verse begins the chapter on the trial and crucifixion of Jesus.

== Content ==
The original Koine Greek, according to Westcott and Hort, reads:

πρωιας δε γενομενης συμβουλιον ελαβον παντες οι αρχιερεις και
οι πρεσβυτεροι του λαου κατα του ιησου ωστε θανατωσαι αυτον

In the King James Version of the Bible it is translated as:

When the morning was come, all the chief priests and elders of
the people took counsel against Jesus to put him to death:

The modern World English Bible translates the passage as:

Now when morning had come, all the chief priests and the elders
of the people took counsel against Jesus to put him to death:

For a collection of other versions see BibleHub Matthew 27:1.

== Analysis ==
This verse describes a capital trial in the Sanhedrin. The council of Jewish leaders has already been mentioned as meeting in Chapter 26. The verse could be interpreted as meaning that a second session of the council was held after the earlier one to continue the trial of Jesus. The other possibility is that this is a continuation of the same session, which began the previous night and reaches its final conclusion close to dawn the night day. Some scholars have argued that this timeline negates the conviction of Jesus, as the Sanhedrin tractate specifies that capital trials had to be held during the day, and their verdicts reached during the day. The gospel itself makes no indication that this is an issue to focus on, there is also no evidence that that rule was in effect at this time, the M. Sanh only being written two centuries later.

In the previous chapter Jesus has been arrested. The three synoptic gospels present this verse differently. At Luke 23:1 it is "all the people" who condemn Jesus. Mark 15:1 speaks of the chief priest, leaders, and scribes. Matthew adds an all to Mark’s version, specifying that it is all of these figures that judged Jesus and drops the scribes. To Gundry the author of Matthew drops the scribes as there are no theological issues being discussed.

As in Matthew 26:3 , "of the people" is added to title of the elders, something not found in Mark.

Although they had made the verdict to put Jesus to death, the Jews did not have the authority to execute the criminals (John 18:31), as this responsibility rested with the Romans.

== Sources ==
- Allison, Dale C. Jr. (2007). "57. Matthew". In Barton, John; Muddiman, John (eds.). The Oxford Bible Commentary (first (paperback) ed.). Oxford University Press. pp. 844–886. ISBN 978-0199277186.

Preceded by Matthew 26:75	Gospel of Matthew; Chapter 27	Succeeded by Matthew 27:2
