= Matthew 27:8 =

- ← 27:7 27:9 →
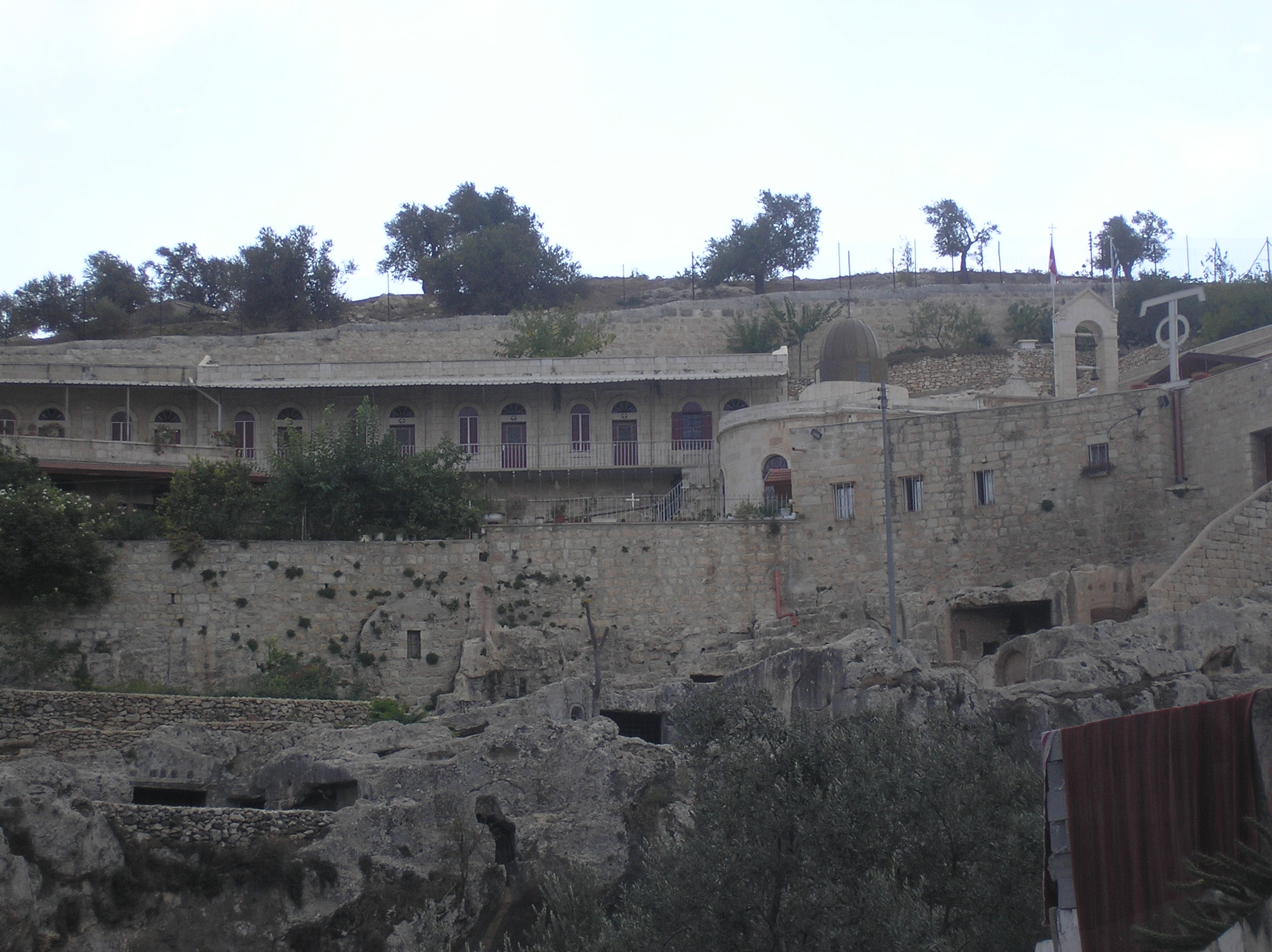
- The monastery built at the traditional location for the Field of Blood.
- Book: Gospel of Matthew
- Christian Bible part: New Testament

Matthew 27:8 is the eighth verse of the twenty-seventh chapter of the Gospel of Matthew in the New Testament. This verse continues the final story of Judas Iscariot. In the previous verses, Judas has killed himself, but not before casting the thirty pieces of silver into the Temple. The priests used them to buy a potter's field and make a cemetery, which is known as the Field of Blood.

== Content ==
The original Koine Greek, according to Westcott and Hort, reads:

διο εκληθη ο αγρος εκεινος αγρος αιματος εως της σημερον

In the King James Version of the Bible it is translated as:

Wherefore that field was called, The field of blood, unto this day.

The modern World English Bible translates the passage as:

Therefore that field was called "The Field of Blood" to this day.

== Analysis ==
The fate of Judas here reconnects with that told in Acts, while the centre of the narratives are very different, both end with a piece of land outside Jerusalem becoming known as the Field of Blood and connected with Judas. In Acts 1:19 it is implied that the field is so known because of Judas' blood from his horrific death. In Matthew, it is implied that it is named for its connection to the blood money that had purchased Jesus' innocent blood. In Acts, the field is referenced by its Hebrew name Akeldama, but Matthew does not refer to it as such.

The author of Matthew assumes that his readers know of this location, and it seems likely that by the era the gospel was being written, this field was a landmark known to early Christians. Eusebius located the field to the north of the Old City of Jerusalem, but Jerome placed it to the south-west, and that location has become the accepted one in later centuries. The soil in the area is heavy in clay, and suitable for a potter. 2 Kings 23:6 and Jeremiah 26:23 mention cemeteries in this region. One of the Dead Sea Scrolls also mentions this area as the place where bloody water from Temple sacrifices would drain. This Temple usage could indicate that Field of Blood was a pre-Christian name, that was later attached to a Christian tradition. There is archaeological evidence that the site was used as a burial place in the first century, but for wealthy Jerusalem Jews, not foreigners.

Preceded by Matthew 27:7	Gospel of Matthew; Chapter 27	Succeeded by Matthew 27:9
