= Matthew 27:2 =

- ← 27:1 27:3 →
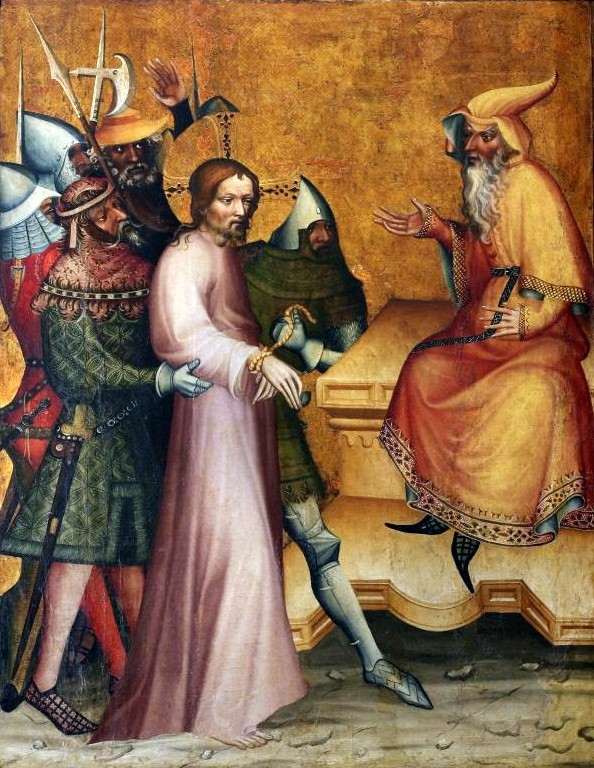
- A 1390 image of Christ before Pilate.
- Book: Gospel of Matthew
- Christian Bible part: New Testament

Matthew 27:2 is the second verse of the twenty-seventh chapter of the Gospel of Matthew in the New Testament. Jesus has been condemned by the Jewish Sanhedrin, and in this verse is handed over to Pontius Pilate.

== Content ==
The original Koine Greek, according to Westcott and Hort, reads:

και δησαντες αυτον απηγαγον και παρεδωκαν πιλατω τω ηγεμονι

In the King James Version of the Bible it is translated as:

And when they had bound him, they led him away, and delivered him to Pontius Pilate the governor.

The modern World English Bible translates the passage as:

and they bound him, and led him away, and delivered him up to Pontius Pilate, the governor.

For a collection of other versions see BibleHub Matthew 27:2.

== Analysis ==
This verse introduces Pontius Pilate in the Gospel of Matthew.

Pilate is a historical figure attested from contemporary sources, including the histories of the Jewish historian Josephus who describes Pilate with neutrality. Philo Judaeus describes Pilate as gratuitously and grievously inhumane, and "at all times a man of most ferocious passions."

Christian sources similarly vary in their portrayal and interpretation of Pilate. The Ethiopian Orthodox Church venerates Pontius Pilate as a saint. Augustine compared Pilate to the Magi in a sermon describing them all as gentiles who acknowledged Jesus Christ as king. The Gospel of Matthew follows the narrative of a weak, but decent, Pilate who is pressured into the crucifixion by the Jewish leaders.

According to the Pilate Stone, Pilate was officially the prefect of Judea. The characterization of Pilate as governor may link with Jesus' prediction at Matthew 10:18 that he would be "dragged before governors." Josephus also refers to him as governor, while Tacitus uses Procurator, the later title for the governor of the region. Pilate's headquarters was at Caesarea Maritima, but his presence in Jerusalem for the Passover feast is customary (see Matthew 27:15) and perhaps logical.

John 18:31 gives as reason for the delivery of Jesus to the Romans by the Sanhedrin that the Jewish authorities lacked lawful authority to carry out executions under Roman rule. This has been questioned by some modern historians. Beginning with Jean Juster in 1914, Hans Lietzmann in 1931 and Paul Winter in 1974 looked at the legal history of the period and found several executions carried out on orders of the Sanhedrin with no mention of Roman authorities. In early Christian tradition Stephen and James were tried and sentenced to death by the Sanhedrin. The right to execute Gentile trespassers into the Temple is also established from documents of the time. Based on these facts Lietzmann and Winter originated a theory that the Jewish trial is not historical, and that the execution of Jesus was a purely Roman matter. The idea that the Jewish authorities did not have this power was a product of the Gospel writers working after the destruction of the Temple, when Roman rule was far more rigid. Other historians, notably A. N. Sherwin-White, disagree. While there are recorded executions by the Jewish authorities, that of James was during a time of lapsed imperial control and that of Stephen perhaps by an extrajudicial mob rather than any formal proceedings. Across the Empire the power of capital punishment was limited only to high Roman authorities. Judea would be exceptional if locals had such rights. Roman enforcement of laws and penal practices, including capital punishment, changed throughout the course of the era and differed in application based on citizenship, gender, and other social aspects of the accused.

Jesus had been bound and taken to Pilate but not accused with any crime. He had already been beaten in Matthew 26:67.

Preceded by Matthew 27:1	Gospel of Matthew; Chapter 27	Succeeded by Matthew 27:3
