= Jeremiah 19 =

Book of Jeremiah, chapter 19

- ← chapter 18 chapter 20 →
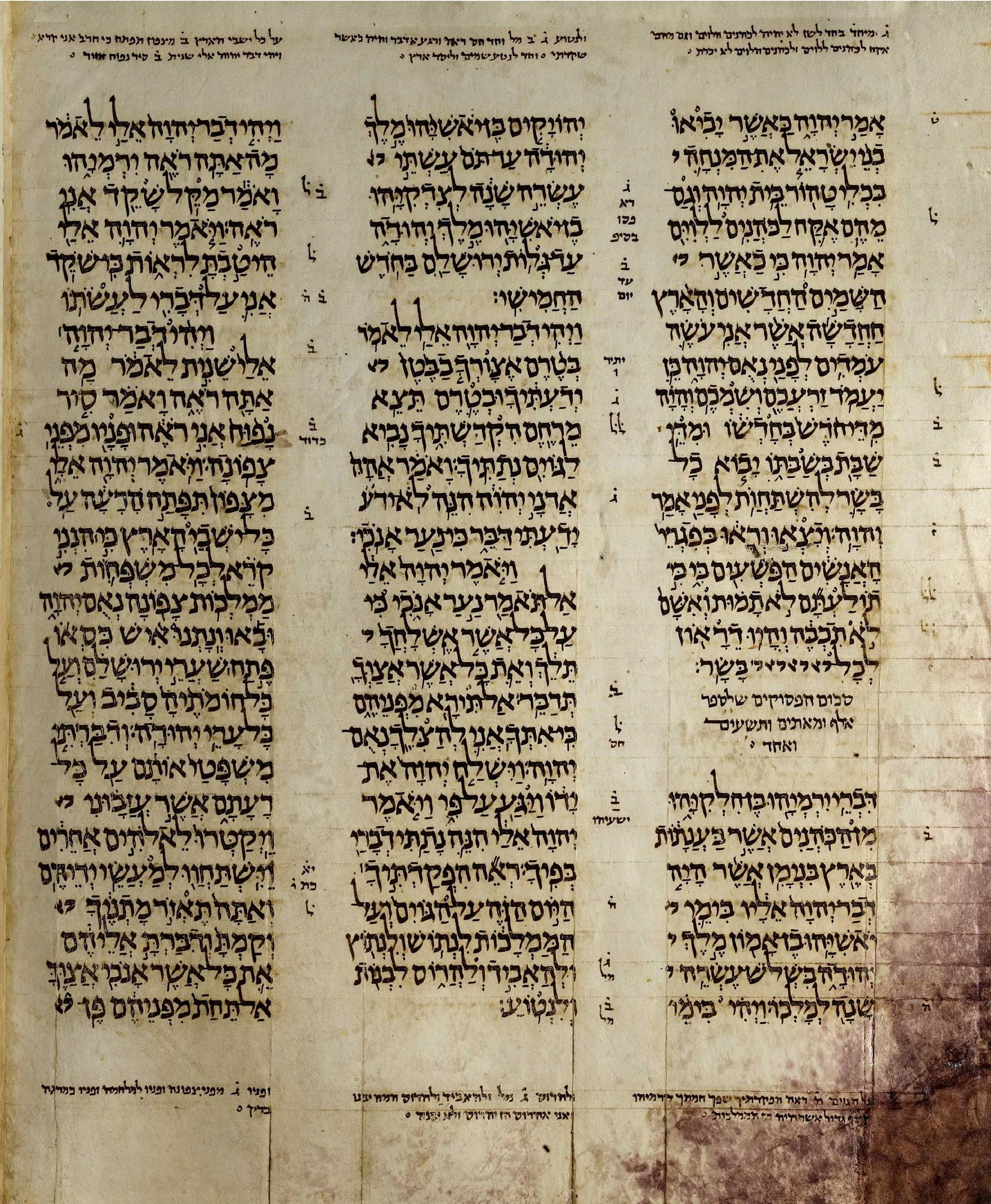
- A high resolution scan of the Aleppo Codex showing the Book of Jeremiah (the sixth book in Nevi'im).
- Book: Book of Jeremiah
- Hebrew Bible part: Nevi'im
- Order in the Hebrew part: 6
- Category: Latter Prophets
- Christian Bible part: Old Testament
- Order in the Christian part: 24

Jeremiah 19 is the nineteenth chapter of the Book of Jeremiah in the Hebrew Bible or the Old Testament of the Christian Bible. This book contains prophecies attributed the prophet Jeremiah, and is one of the Books of the Prophets.

== Text ==
The original text was written in Hebrew language. This chapter is divided into 15 verses.

=== Textual witnesses ===
Some early manuscripts containing the text of this chapter in Hebrew are of the Masoretic Text tradition, which includes the Codex Cairensis (895), the Petersburg Codex of the Prophets (916), Aleppo Codex (10th century), Codex Leningradensis (1008). Some fragments containing parts of this chapter were found among the Dead Sea Scrolls, i.e., 4QJer^{a} (4Q70; 225-175 BCE) with the extant verse 1, and 4QJer^{c} (4Q72; 1st century BC) with extant verses 8-9 (similar to Masoretic Text).

There is also a translation into Koine Greek known as the Septuagint, made in the last few centuries BCE. Extant ancient manuscripts of the Septuagint version include Codex Vaticanus (B; $\mathfrak{G}$^{B}; 4th century), Codex Sinaiticus (S; BHK: $\mathfrak{G}$^{S}; 4th century), Codex Alexandrinus (A; $\mathfrak{G}$^{A}; 5th century) and Codex Marchalianus (Q; $\mathfrak{G}$^{Q}; 6th century).

== Parashot ==
The parashah sections listed here are based on the Aleppo Codex. Jeremiah 19 is a part of the Seventh prophecy (Jeremiah 18-20) in the section of Prophecies of Destruction (Jeremiah 1-25). {P}: open parashah; {S}: closed parashah.

{S} 19:1-5 {P} 19:6-13 {P} 19:14 {S} 19:15 [20:1-3 {S}]

== Verse 1 ==
Thus says the Lord: "Go and get a potter’s earthen flask, and take some of the elders of the people and some of the elders of the priests."

- "Take some of the elders of the people and some of the elders of the priests": In the King James Version: take of the ancients of the people, and of the ancients of the priests, in the Septuagint, "take some of the elders of the people, and [some] of the priests" (Greek: ἀπὸ τῶν πρεσβυτέρων τοῦ λαοῦ καὶ ἀπὸ τῶν ἱερέων).

== Verse 2 ==
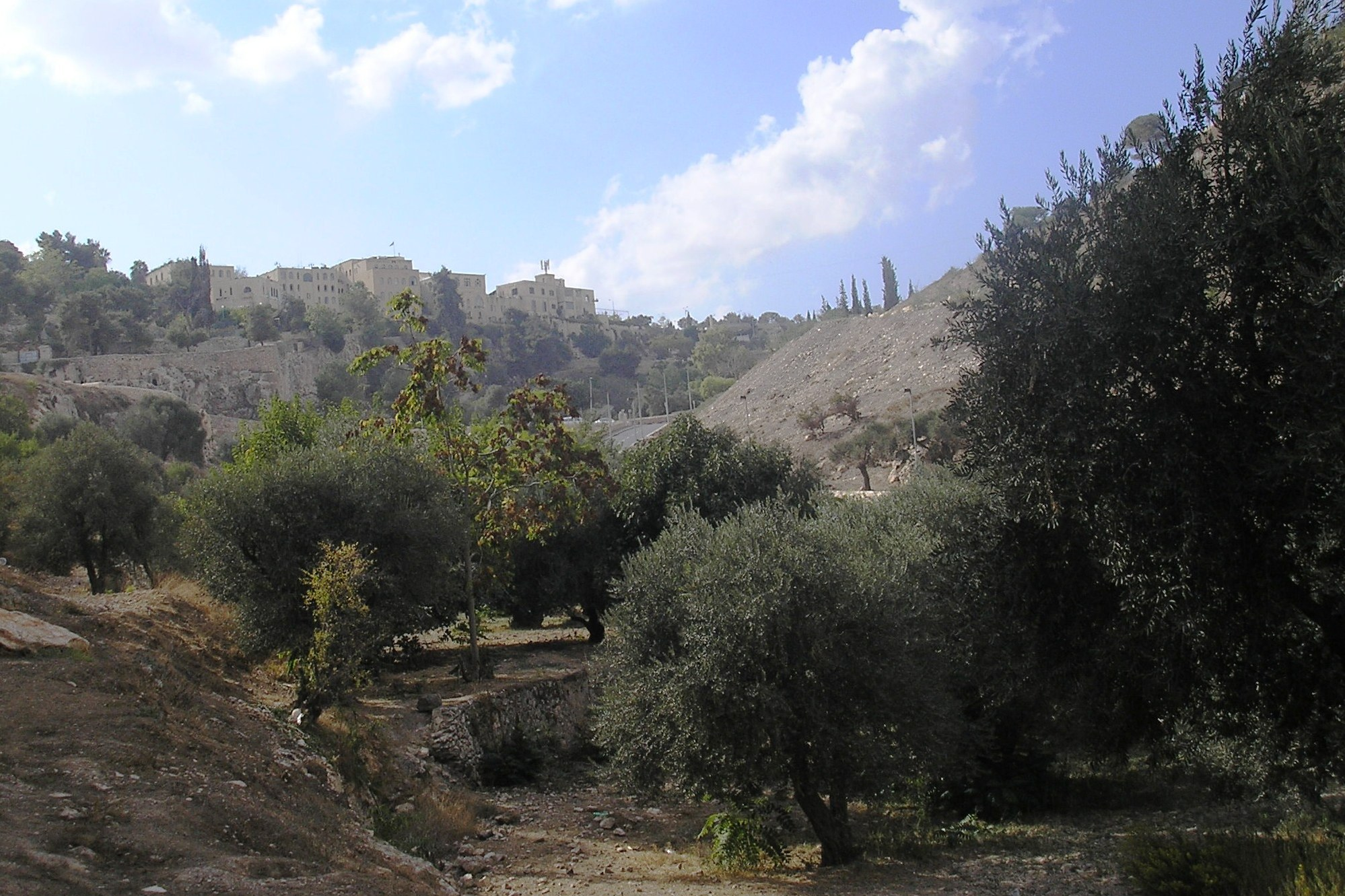
Valley of Hinnom, 2007.

And go out to the Valley of the Son of Hinnom, which is by the entry of the Potsherd Gate; and proclaim there the words that I will tell you,

- Cross references: Jeremiah 7:31, 19:6
- "The valley of the Son of Hinnom": from Hebrew: גיא בן הנם, gê ḇen-hin-nōm, located very near to Jerusalem, of which a certain Hinnom was owner in Joshua's time (Joshua 15:8; 18:16), later is known as "Ge-hinnom" ("the valley of Hinnom"), that became the Greek word Gehenna, used by Jesus in Matthew 5:22. The site was 'the scene of the most hateful form of idolatry' (Jeremiah 7:31), perhaps also connected locally with the potter's field. (cf. Matthew 27:7).

== Verse 6 ==
Therefore, behold, the days come, saith the LORD, that this place shall no more be called Tophet, nor The valley of the son of Hinnom, but The valley of slaughter.

- Cross references: Joshua 15:8; 18:16; Jeremiah 7:31, 19:2

Using the setting of the valley, Jeremiah prophecies the people's horrible future that make them "resort to cannibalism", as one of the "curses for covenant violation" (Leviticus 26:29; Deuteronomy 28:53).

== See also ==
- Israel
- Jeremiah
- Jerusalem
- Judah
- Tophet
- Valley of the Son of Hinnom
- Related Bible parts: Jeremiah 7, Lamentations 2, Lamentations 4, Ezekiel 5

== Sources ==
- Coogan, Michael David (2007). Coogan, Michael David; Brettler, Marc Zvi; Newsom, Carol Ann; Perkins, Pheme (eds.). The New Oxford Annotated Bible with the Apocryphal/Deuterocanonical Books: New Revised Standard Version, Issue 48 (Augmented 3rd ed.). Oxford University Press. ISBN 9780195288810.
- Fitzmyer, Joseph A. (2008). A Guide to the Dead Sea Scrolls and Related Literature. Grand Rapids, MI: William B. Eerdmans Publishing Company. ISBN 9780802862419.
- Ulrich, Eugene, ed. (2010). The Biblical Qumran Scrolls: Transcriptions and Textual Variants. Brill.
- Würthwein, Ernst (1995). The Text of the Old Testament. Translated by Rhodes, Erroll F. Grand Rapids, MI: Wm. B. Eerdmans. ISBN 978-0-8028-0788-5.
