= Matthew 27:3 =

- ← 27:2 27:4 →
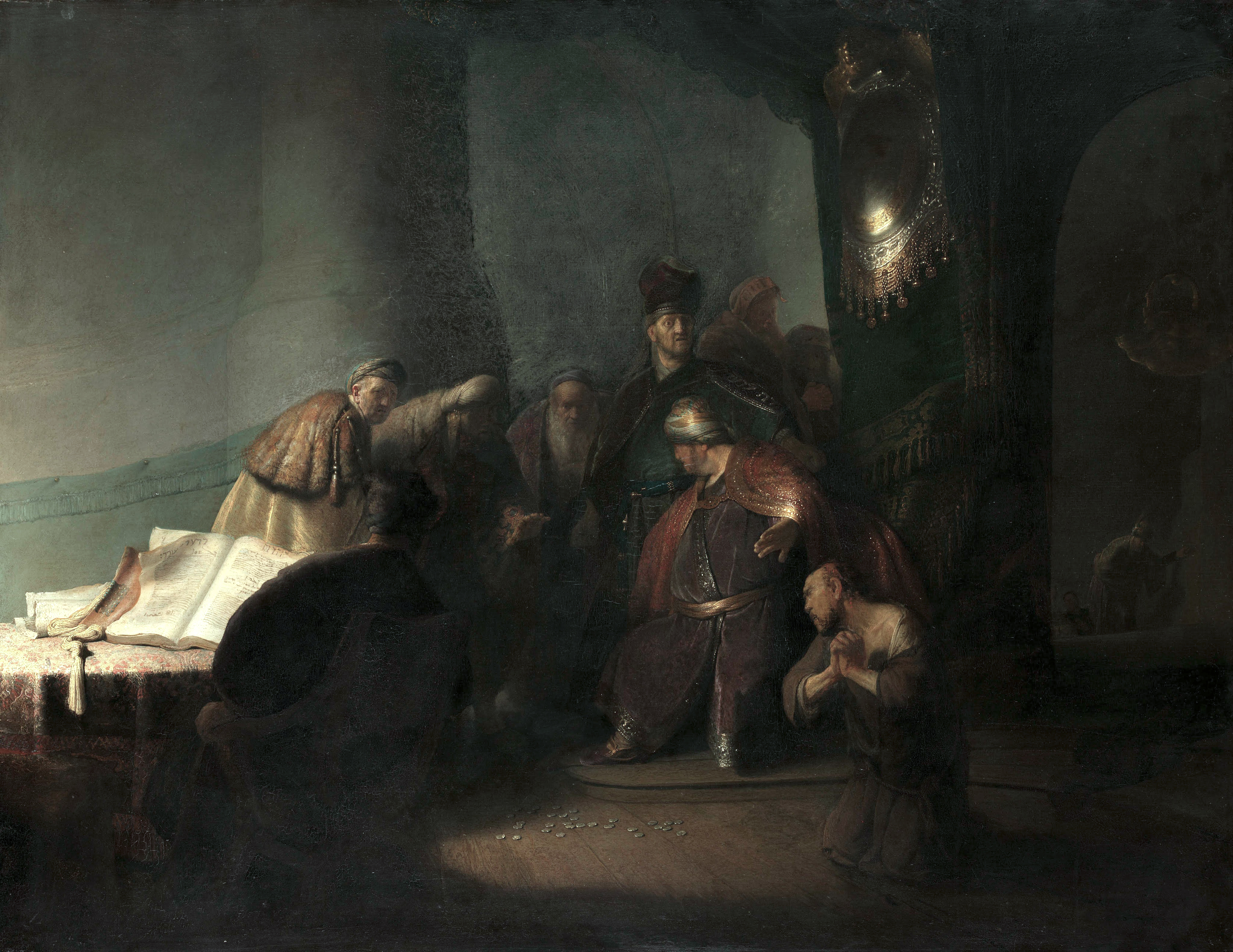
- Rembrandt's depiction of Judas before the priests and elders
- Book: Gospel of Matthew
- Christian Bible part: New Testament

Matthew 27:3 is the third verse of the twenty-seventh chapter of the Gospel of Matthew in the New Testament. This verse returns to the story of Judas Iscariot who, in the previous chapter, had accepted payment to betray Jesus to the Jewish authorities. This verse opens the story of Judas' remorse and death (verses 3-10), interrupting the Gospel's narrative regarding the trials of Jesus.

== Content ==
The original Koine Greek, according to Westcott and Hort, reads:

τοτε ιδων ιουδας ο παραδους αυτον οτι κατεκριθη μεταμεληθεις
εστρεψεν τα τριακοντα αργυρια τοις αρχιερευσιν και πρεσβυτεροις

In the King James Version of the Bible it is translated as:

Then Judas, which had betrayed him, when he saw that he was condemned, repented himself,
and brought again the thirty pieces of silver to the chief priests and elders,

The modern World English Bible translates the passage as:

Then Judas, who betrayed him, when he saw that Jesus was condemned, felt remorse,
and brought back the thirty pieces of silver to the chief priests and elders,

For a collection of other versions see BibleHub Matthew 27:3.

== Analysis ==
Matthew is the only Gospel to discuss the final fate of Judas, and this verse is not paralleled in either Mark or Luke. The passion narrative in the Gospel of Matthew follows very closely that of Mark, and this section on Judas is the largest deviation. As the two-source hypothesis assumes Matthew was based on Mark, there has long been debate on the source of this material.

While not found in Luke, a variation on Matthew's material can be found at Acts 1:18-20. A third version appears in the early Christian writings of Papias of Hierapolis, which recounts that Judas "was crushed by the chariot". The different stories have some material in common but differ substantially in the details. One view is that this passage is not based on a written source, such as Q, but rather a separate oral tradition that was circulating in the early Christian community at the time the Gospel was written. The author Matthew shapes that tradition to conform to his interests, such as Old Testament parallels.

τοτε, then, is ambiguous as to the precise timing of these events. The author of Matthew places them here to make clear that the final condemnation of Jesus was that of the Sanhedrin. The last two verses, however, have the Sanhedrin ending its meeting and the leaders have conveyed Jesus to Pontius Pilate. It is thus possible that Judas' reversal is some time after the initial trial. By Matthew 27:8, the end of this Judas narrative, it is clear that the time being discussed is after the crucifixion. From the words "when he saw that he was condemned", it has been suggested that Judas had not expected this to be the result of his actions.

Despite the translation used by the King James Version, the author of Matthew does not have Judas repent, as Peter did in Matthew 26:75. Rather he feels remorse and changes his mind. This distinction is important to Christian theology, as the truly repentant are expected to be forgiven, but Christian tradition has always treated Judas as condemned for his betrayal of Jesus. However, some scholars, such as W. D. Davies and Dale Allison, do not see as sharp a distinction between Judas' remorse and Peter's repentance.

Preceded by Matthew 27:2	Gospel of Matthew; Chapter 27	Succeeded by Matthew 27:4
