= Matthew 27 =

- ← Chapter 26 Chapter 28 →
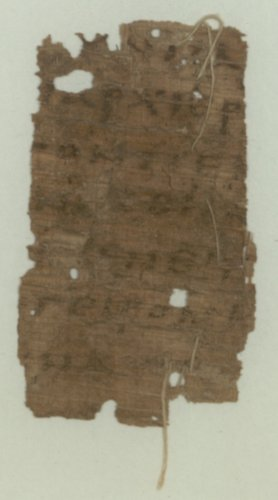
- Gospel of Matthew 27:62–64 on Papyrus 105, from 5th/6th century
- Book: Gospel of Matthew
- Category: Gospel
- Christian Bible part: New Testament
- Order in the Christian part: 1

Matthew 27 is the 27th chapter in the Gospel of Matthew, part of the New Testament in the Christian Bible. This chapter contains Matthew's record of the day of the trial, crucifixion and burial of Jesus. Scottish theologian William Robertson Nicoll notes that "the record of this single day is very nearly one-ninth of the whole book".

== Text ==
The original text was written in Koine Greek. This chapter is divided into 66 verses.

=== Textual witnesses ===
Some early manuscripts containing the text of this chapter are:

- Codex Vaticanus (325–350)
- Codex Sinaiticus (330–360)
- Codex Bezae (c. 400; extant verses 1, 13–66)
- Codex Washingtonianus (c. 400)
- Codex Ephraemi Rescriptus (c. 450; extant verses 1–10, 47–66)
- Papyrus 105 (5th/6th century; extant verses 62–64)
- Codex Purpureus Rossanensis (6th century)
- Codex Petropolitanus Purpureus (6th century; extant verses 27–33)

=== Old Testament references ===
- Matthew 27:34: Psalm 69:21: Alexander Kirkpatrick notes that "allusion seems to be made to this passage ... though it is not actually quoted".
- Matthew 27:35: Psalm 22:18
- Matthew 27:39: Psalm 22:7
- Matthew 27:43: Psalm 22:8
- Matthew 27:46: Psalm 22:1
- Matthew 27:48: Psalm 69:21

=== New Testament parallels ===
- Matthew 27:1–2, 11–26: Mark 15:1–15; Luke 23:1–5,13–25; John 18:28–19:16
- Matthew 27:27–31: Mark 15:16–20; John 19:2–3
- Matthew 27:32–44: Mark 15:20–32; Luke 23:26,33–43; John 19:17–24
- Matthew 27:45–56: Mark 15:33–41; Luke 23:44–49; John 19:28–30
- Matthew 27:57–61: Mark 15:42–47; Luke 23:50–56; John 19:38–42

== Structure ==
The New International Version (NIV) organises the material in this chapter as follows:

- Judas Hangs Himself (verses 1–10)
- Jesus Before Pilate (verses 11–26)
- The Soldiers Mock Jesus (verses 26–31)
- The Crucifixion of Jesus (verses 32–44)
- The Death of Jesus (verses 45–56)
- The Burial of Jesus (verses 57–61)
- The Guard at the Tomb (verses 62–66)

== Overview ==
During the morning after his arrest, the trial of Jesus before the Sanhedrin is concluded with plans to have Jesus executed (verse 1), and he is taken to Pontius Pilate, the Roman governor (procurator) of Judaea. As Jesus is being led away, Judas Iscariot, who had betrayed Jesus, sees that his former teacher has been condemned, and is overcome by remorse: in the words of the King James Version, he "repented himself". The word translated as "repented" (Greek: μεταμεληθεις, metamelētheis) is not the same as the word for repentance which John the Baptist and Jesus himself used in their ministry (Greek: μετανοειτε, metanoeite); Arthur Carr, in the Cambridge Bible for Schools and Colleges notes that "it implies no change of heart or life, but merely remorse or regret".

Judas brings back the 30 pieces of silver which had been given to him by the priests of Judea as recompense for identifying his master to Caiaphas, throwing them down in the temple, and then leaves to commit suicide. Meanwhile, Jesus impresses Pilate, who is taken aback by Jesus' silent dignity at his questioning over the "many charges" brought against him. Pilate begins to address the crowd, and knowing (or "shrewdly suspecting") that the chief priests had handed Jesus over because they were jealous of his popularity, asks the crowd to choose between freeing a notorious prisoner known as Barabbas, or Jesus. The crowd, persuaded by the chief priests and elders, respond passionately, repeating "Let Him (Christ) be crucified!" Pilate, bewildered by this, asks the crowd for a reason for their choice. Instead, they continue to call ever more loudly for the crucifixion of Jesus.

Pilate comes to see that he cannot reason with the crowd. His wife has had a disturbing dream and asks him to have "nothing to do with that just man". Instead, he tries to absolve himself of his responsibility in the case, washing his hands in a basin and saying to the crowd: "I am innocent of the blood of this just Person. You see to it". Then the Jews present at the trial take responsibility for the shedding of Jesus' blood. Pilate has Barabbas released, lets Jesus be flogged and sends him off to be crucified.

Jesus is led away to the Praetorium of the Governor's Residence, where Pilate's guard and the praetorian guard mock him, giving him a scarlet robe in place of his own clothes, a reed to hold as a sign of his "kingship" and a crown made of twisted thorns. The soldiers then replace the robe with Jesus' own clothes and lead him to Golgotha (the "place of a skull"); in Luke's Gospel this journey is recorded with "several particulars of what happened on the way to Golgotha, omitted in the other Gospels: the great company of people and of women who followed Him; the touching address of Jesus to the women; the last warning of the coming sorrows; the leading of two malefactors with Him". A man named Simon, from Cyrene, is compelled to carry Jesus' cross. At Golgotha he is offered a mixture of either wine (Greek: "οἶνον") or vinegar (Greek: "ὄξος") mingled with gall (Greek: "χολή"), which he tastes but does not drink. The soldiers cast lots for his garments once he is crucified. Those who pass him deride him, taunting him to come down from the cross, saying "He trusts in God, let God deliver him now".

At three o'clock Jesus cries "My God, why have you forsaken me?", and starts to give up on his life. One passer-by offers Jesus some wine to drink but the group tell him "Wait, let us see if Elijah comes to save him". They misunderstand Jesus' pleas, as he is in tremendous physical pain. Jesus cries out once more, but eventually dies.

Suddenly, "the crucifixion scene transforms into an explosion of triumph ... as if God responds to the lingering sound of Jesus’ death prayer": the veil of the Temple sanctuary is torn in two, rocks start to split, and an earthquake occurs (verse 51), and there follows, after Jesus' resurrection, a resurrection of the dead saints, who enter the holy city. This indicates how the earth has been shaken by the death of the Son of God. Centurions stare on at Jesus in disbelief, as do other bystanders. Arthur Carr comments that the rending of the temple veil must have been seen and reported by the temple priests, perhaps those who later (Acts 6:7) became "obedient to the faith".

On the night following Jesus' death, Joseph of Arimathea, a disciple of Jesus, asks for the body of Jesus. Pilate permits this, and Joseph, wrapping the body in a linen cloth, buries the body and rolls a stone against the entrance of the tomb, sealing it from looters and gravediggers.

Meanwhile, the priests and pharisees remember Jesus' remark that "After three days I will rise". The chapter concludes with Pilate authorising a detachment of troops to guard the tomb, in case the disciples come to remove the body.

== Analysis ==
Matthew's crucifixion story has many parallels with Mark's crucifixion story. However, Matthew follows a theme recurring throughout his gospel by providing deeper descriptions than Mark. Matthew's crucifixion scene runs for only sixteen verses from 27:35 to 27:51, the same number of verses as in the Gospel of Mark, but one more than the Gospel of Luke, and three more than the Gospel of John. It is postulated that all writers wished to simply recall the facts surrounding Jesus' death, rather than engage in theological reflection.

Mark 15:24, Luke 23:33, John 19:18, Matthew 27:35 all share a succinct summary of the crucifixion, in that they all say, "They crucified Him". Mark and John give an account of the time of Jesus' death ("The third hour" in Mark 15:25, and the "sixth hour" in John 19:14–15), whereas Luke, and Matthew himself do not.

There are differences between the Gospels as to what the last words of Jesus were. Matthew 27:46 and Mark 15:34 declare that Jesus' last words were: "Why have you forsaken me"?, whereas his words in Luke 23:46 are "Father, into thy hands I commend my spirit", and in John 19:30, "It is finished".

Further differences can be found in the Gospels as to whether Jesus carried his own cross or not. In the Gospels of Matthew, Luke and Mark, Jesus receives assistance from Simon of Cyrene, whereas in the Gospel of John, Jesus carries the cross by himself.

== Parallelism ==
Dale Allison notes an obvious formal feature in Matthew 27:3–10, that is, a parallelism underlining the fulfillment between the scriptural quotation (cf. Zechariah 11:13) and the narrative:

the narrative	verse(s)	the quotation	verse
'taking'	6	'they took'	9
'thirty pieces of silver'	3, 5,6	'thirty pieces of silver'	9
'money' (Greek: time)	6	'price' (timen)	9
'the potter's field'	7, 8	'the potter's field'	10

Other resemblances between Matthew 27:51–55 and Matthew 28:1–11 are also noted by Allison:

The Death of Jesus	The Resurrection of Jesus
An earthquake	An earthquake
Opening of tombs	Opening of tombs
A resurrection	A resurrection
The guards fear	The guards fear
Witnesses to the events (the resurrected saints) go to the holy city	Witnesses to the events (the Jewish guards) go to the city
There are women witnesses (including Mary Magdalene and another Mary)	There are women witnesses (Mary Magdalene and another Mary)

== See also ==
- Blood curse
- Christ carrying the cross
- Crown of thorns
- Crucifixion of Jesus
- Judas Iscariot
- Pontius Pilate
- Pilate's court
- Stephaton
- Matthew 27:9–10
- Related Bible parts: Judges 9, Psalm 22, Jeremiah 32, Zechariah 11, Mark 15, Luke 23, John 18, John 19

== Sources ==
- Allison, Dale C. Jr. (2007). "57. Matthew". In Barton, John; Muddiman, John (eds.). The Oxford Bible Commentary (first (paperback) ed.). Oxford University Press. pp. 844–886. ISBN 978-0199277186.
- Kirkpatrick, A. F. (1901). The Book of Psalms: with Introduction and Notes. The Cambridge Bible for Schools and Colleges. Vol. Book IV and V: Psalms XC-CL. Cambridge: At the University Press.
