= Jeremiah 18 =

Book of Jeremiah, chapter 18

- ← chapter 17 chapter 19 →
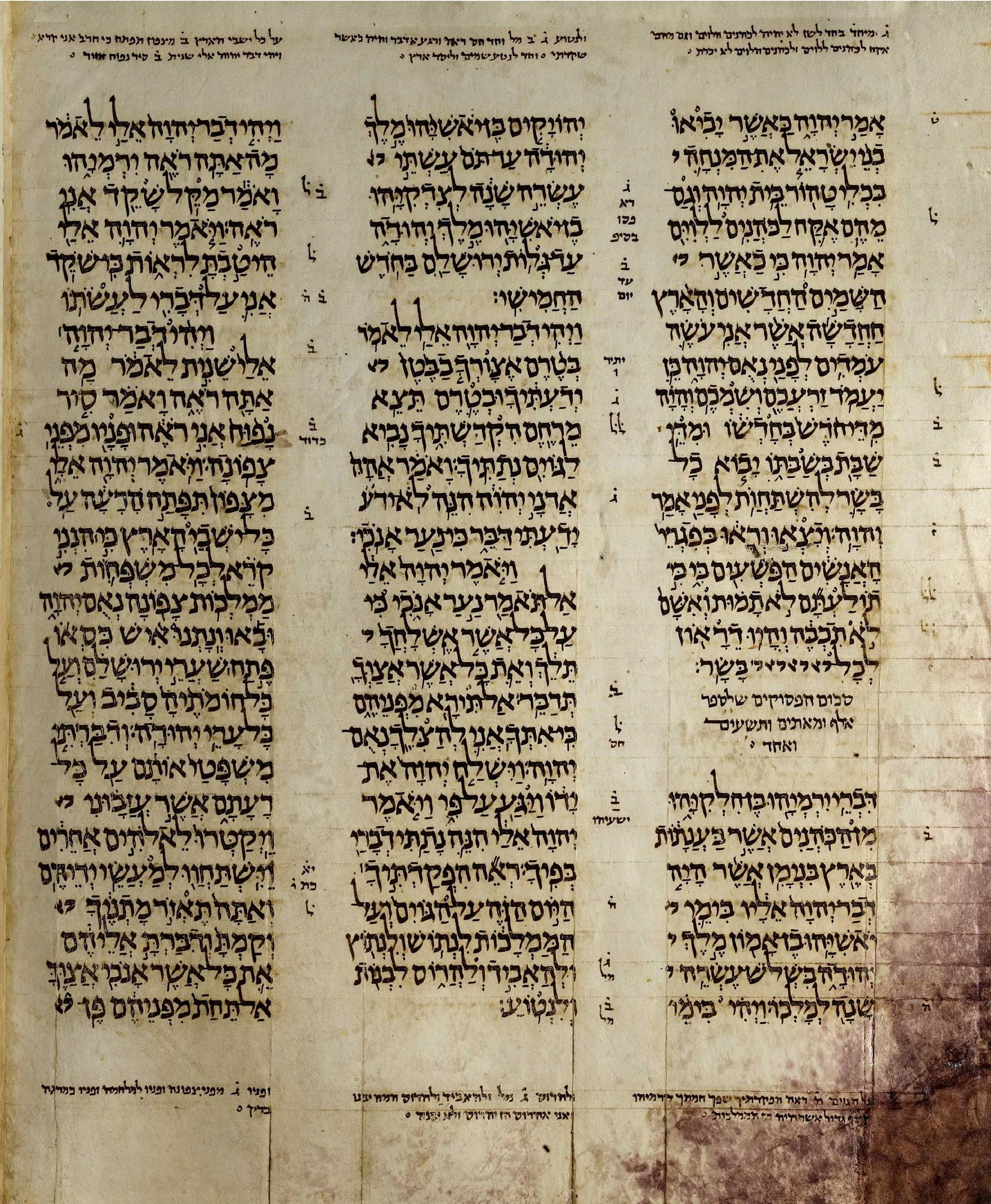
- A high resolution scan of the Aleppo Codex showing the Book of Jeremiah (the sixth book in Nevi'im).
- Book: Book of Jeremiah
- Hebrew Bible part: Nevi'im
- Order in the Hebrew part: 6
- Category: Latter Prophets
- Christian Bible part: Old Testament
- Order in the Christian part: 24

Jeremiah 18 is the eighteenth chapter of the Book of Jeremiah in the Hebrew Bible or the Old Testament of the Christian Bible. This book contains prophecies attributed to the prophet Jeremiah, and is one of the Books of the Prophets. This chapter includes the fourth of the passages known as the "Confessions of Jeremiah" (Jeremiah 18:18–23).

== Text ==
The original text of this chapter is written in the Hebrew language. This chapter is divided into 23 verses.

=== Textual witnesses ===
Some early manuscripts containing the text of this chapter in Hebrew are of the Masoretic Text tradition, which includes the Codex Cairensis (895), the Petersburg Codex of the Prophets (916), Aleppo Codex (10th century), Codex Leningradensis (1008). Some fragments containing parts of this chapter were found among the Dead Sea Scrolls, i.e., 4QJer^{a} (4Q70; 225-175 BCE) with extant verses 15–23.

There is also a translation into Koine Greek known as the Septuagint, made in the last few centuries BCE. Extant ancient manuscripts of the Septuagint version include Codex Vaticanus (B; $\mathfrak{G}$^{B}; 4th century), Codex Sinaiticus (S; BHK: $\mathfrak{G}$^{S}; 4th century), Codex Alexandrinus (A; $\mathfrak{G}$^{A}; 5th century) and Codex Marchalianus (Q; $\mathfrak{G}$^{Q}; 6th century).

== Parashot ==
The parashah (plural parashot) sections listed here are based on the Aleppo Codex. Jeremiah 18 is a part of the Seventh prophecy (Jeremiah 18-20) in the section of Prophecies of Destruction (Jeremiah 1-25). {P}: open parashah; {S}: closed parashah.

{P} 18:1-4 {S} 18:5-6 {S} 18:7-8 {S} 18:9-10 {S} 18:11-12 {P} 18:13-17 {S} 18:18-23 {S}

== Verse 2 ==
Arise and go down to the potter’s house, and there I will cause you to hear My words.

In the New Testament, Matthew's gospel refers the words which were "spoken by Jeremiah the prophet" anticipating the use of the money paid to Judas Iscariot for his betrayal of Jesus. Whilst the text of Zechariah 11:12-13 is a closer match to the gospel, writers such as John Calvin, Carl Friedrich Keil and Heinrich Meyer have suggested that an error on the part of the evangelist "might readily enough occur through a reminiscence of Jeremiah 18:2".

== Verse 6 ==
"O house of Israel, can I not do with you as this potter?" says the Lord.
"Look, as the clay is in the potter's hand, so are you in My hand, O house of Israel!

- God as the potter and Israel as the clay "underscores God's complete control" (Isaiah 29:16; Isaiah 45:9).

== See also ==
- Clay
- Israel
- Jeremiah
- Jerusalem
- Judah
- Pottery
- Related Bible parts: Isaiah 29, Isaiah 45, Isaiah 64, Romans 9, Romans 11

== Bibliography ==
- The Nelson Study Bible. Thomas Nelson, Inc. 1997. ISBN 9780840715999.
- Ulrich, Eugene, ed. (2010). The Biblical Qumran Scrolls: Transcriptions and Textual Variants. Brill.
- Würthwein, Ernst (1995). The Text of the Old Testament. Translated by Rhodes, Erroll F. Grand Rapids, MI: Wm. B. Eerdmans. ISBN 0-8028-0788-7.
