= Bargain of Judas =

Biblical episode

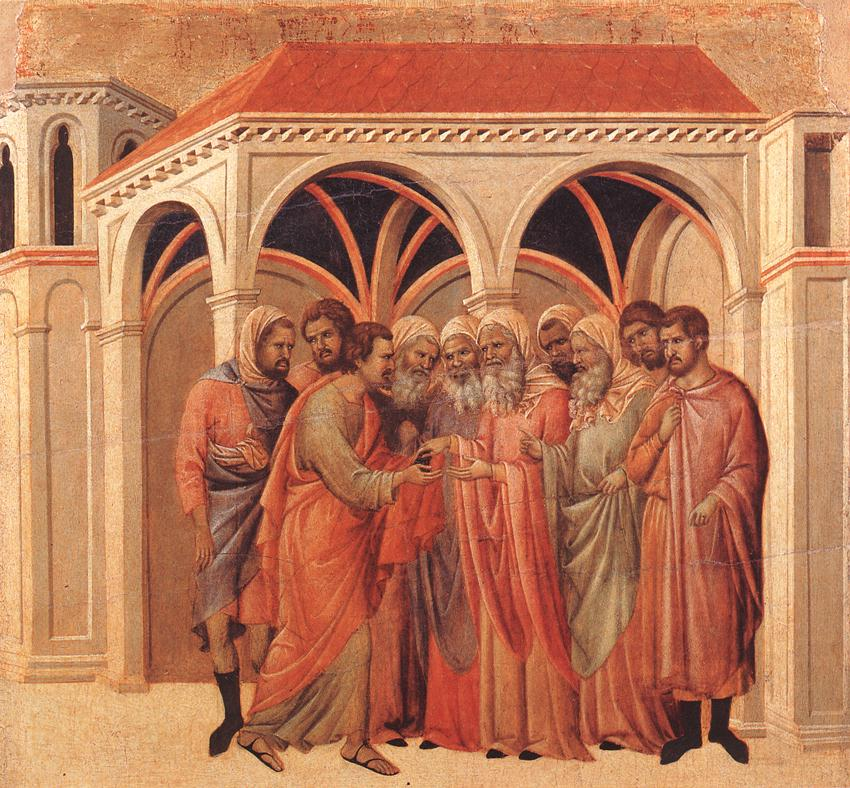
Judas making a bargain with the priests, depicted by Duccio, early 14th century

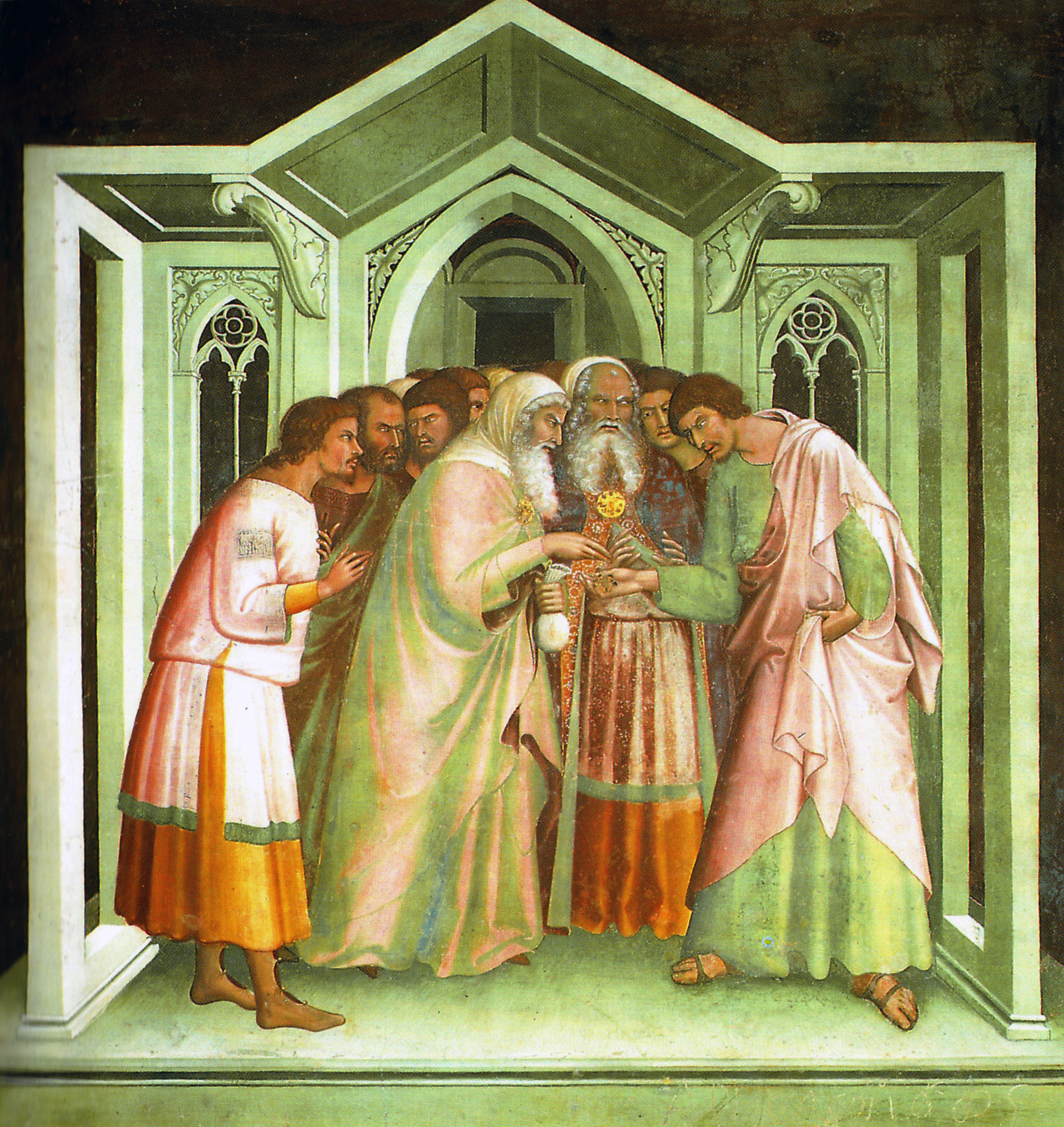
Bargain of Judas, fresco by Lippo Memmi, 14th century

The Bargain of Judas is a biblical episode related to the life of Jesus which is recorded in all three Synoptic Gospels, Matthew 26:14–16, Mark 14:10–11 and Luke 22:1–6. It relates how Judas Iscariot made a bargain with the Jewish chief priests to betray Jesus.

== Biblical accounts ==
The Gospel of Matthew specifies that Judas received thirty pieces of silver:

Then one of the Twelve — the one called Judas Iscariot — went to the chief priests and asked, "What are you willing to give me if I hand him over to you?" So they counted out for him thirty silver coins. From then on Judas watched for an opportunity to hand him over.

The Gospel of Mark and the Gospel of Luke mention no price. Luke's Gospel states that Satan entered Judas to prompt him for the bargain:

Now the Feast of Unleavened Bread, called the Passover, was approaching, and the chief priests and the teachers of the law were looking for some way to get rid of Jesus, for they were afraid of the people. Then Satan entered Judas, called Iscariot, one of the Twelve. And Judas went to the chief priests and the officers of the temple guard and discussed with them how he might betray Jesus. They were delighted and agreed to give him money. He consented, and watched for an opportunity to hand Jesus over to them when no crowd was present.

== Analysis ==
The word which is translated "counted out" (Greek: εστησαν, estēsan) in modern translations like the Good News Translation and the New International Version appears as "they appointed unto him" in the Geneva Bible, "they covenanted with him" in the King James Version, "they weighed out" in the American Standard Version and as "they settled with him" in J. B. Phillips' 1960 translation. The prophetic text of Zechariah 11:12, in most English translations, uses the word "weighed":

Then I said to them, "If it seems right to you, give me my wages; but if not, keep them." And they weighed out as my wages thirty shekels of silver.

Later in the narratives of all three synoptic gospels, Jesus is betrayed by the Kiss of Judas. John's Gospel records Judas' betrayal but not his "kiss". The Bargain of Judas is considered one of the seven key episodes which relate to the events of the week of the Crucifixion of Jesus.

== See also ==
- Chronology of Jesus
- Thirty pieces of silver
- Jesus predicts his betrayal
- Kiss of Judas
- Life of Jesus in the New Testament
- Gospel of Judas
