= Thirty pieces of silver =

Price paid during Jesus's betrayal

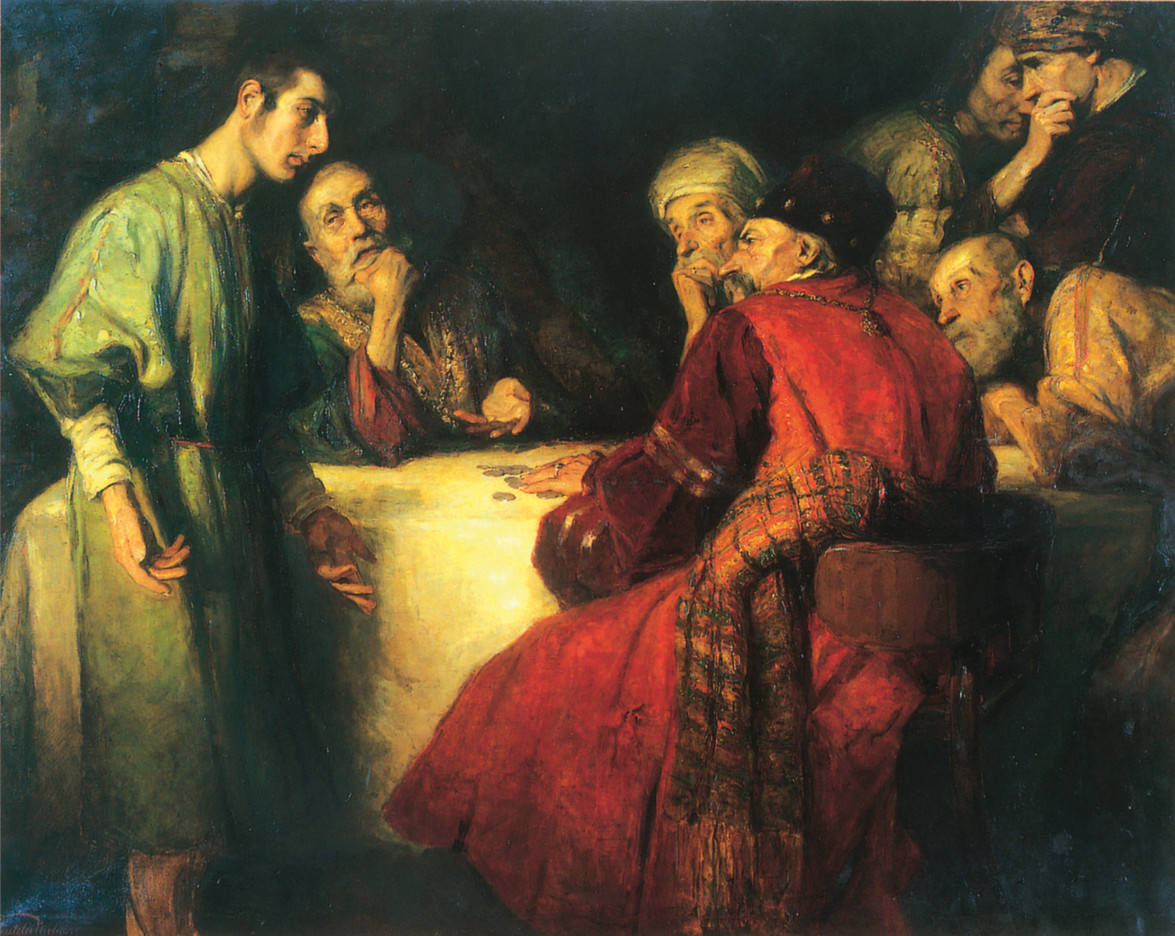
Judas receiving thirty pieces of silver for betraying Jesus, by János Pentelei Molnár, 1909.

Thirty pieces of silver was the price for which Judas Iscariot betrayed Jesus, according to an account in the Gospel of Matthew 26:15 in the New Testament. Before the Last Supper, Judas is said to have gone to the chief priests and agreed to hand over Jesus in exchange for 30 silver coins and to have attempted to return the money afterwards, filled with remorse.

The Gospel of Matthew claims that the subsequent purchase of the potter's field was fulfilment by Jesus of a prophecy of Zechariah.

The image has often been used in artwork depicting the Passion of Christ. The phrase is used in literature and common speech to refer to people "selling out", compromising a trust, friendship, or integrity for personal gain.

== Biblical narrative ==
According to the Gospel of Matthew, Judas Iscariot was a disciple of Jesus. Before the Last Supper, Judas went to the chief priests and agreed to hand over Jesus in exchange for 30 silver coins. Jesus was then arrested in Gethsemane, where Judas revealed Jesus's identity to the soldiers by giving him a kiss.

According to Chapter 27 of Matthew's gospel, Judas was filled with remorse and returned the money to the chief priests before hanging himself. The chief priests decided that they could not put it into the temple treasury as it was considered blood money, and so with it they bought the Potter's Field.

A different account of the death of Judas is given in the Book of Acts 1:17–20; in it, Peter is quoted as saying: "With the payment he received for his wickedness, Judas bought a field; there he fell headlong, his body burst open and all his intestines spilled out." Although the Gospel of Luke, which is commonly thought to have been written by the same author as Acts, mentions in 22:3–6 that Judas and the chief priests and temple guard officers agreed on a price, the amount is not specified, nor is the money paid up front as in Matthew.

== Types of coin ==
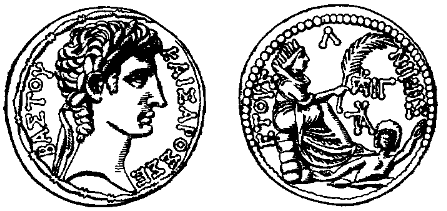
The Antiochan Stater is one possibility for the identity of the coins making up the thirty pieces.

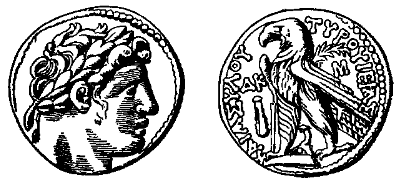
A Tyrian shekel, another possibility for the type of coin involved

The word used in Matthew 26:15 (ἀργύρια, argyria) simply means "silver coins", and scholars disagree on the type of coins that would have been used. Donald Wiseman suggests two possibilities. They could have been tetradrachms of Tyre, usually referred to as Tyrian shekels (14 grams of 94% silver), or staters from Antioch (15 grams of 75% silver), which bore the head of Augustus. Alternatively, they could have been Ptolemaic tetradrachms (13.5 ± 1 g of 25% silver). There are 31.1035 grams per troy ounce. At spot valuation of $35/ozt in 2025, 30 "pieces of silver" would be worth approximately $114 to $552 in present-day value (USD) depending on which coin was used.

Type	Purity	Weight (g)	Actual Silver Weight (g)	ASW of 30 coins (ozt)	Silver Value at 2021 prices
Tyrian shekels	94%	14	13.16	12.69	$444.15
Antioch staters	75%	15	11.25	10.85	$379.75
Ptolemaic tetradrachms	25%	13.5	3.375	3.26	$114.10
Athenian tetradrachms	95%	17.2	16.34	15.76	$551.60

The Tyrian shekel weighed four Athenian drachmas, about 14 grams, more than earlier 11-gram Israeli shekels, but was regarded as the equivalent for religious duties at that time. Because Roman coinage was only 80% silver, the purer (94% or more) Tyrian shekels were required to pay the temple tax in Jerusalem. The money changers referenced in the New Testament Gospels (Matt. 21:12 and parallels) exchanged Tyrian shekels for common Roman currency.

The Athenian tetradrachm ("four drachmae") coin from the 5th century BC was likely the most widely used coin in the Greek world before the time of Alexander the Great, alongside the Corinthian stater. It featured the helmeted profile bust of Athena on the obverse (front) and an owl on the reverse (back). In daily use they were called γλαῦκες glaukes (owls), hence the proverb Γλαῦκ’ Ἀθήναζε, 'an owl to Athens', referring to something that was in plentiful supply, like 'coals to Newcastle'. The reverse is featured on the national side of the modern Greek 1 euro coin. Drachmae were minted on different weight standards at different Greek mints. The standard that came to be most commonly used was the Athenian or Attic one, which weighed a little over 4.3 grams. A drachma was approximately a day's pay for a skilled laborer. So 30 pieces of silver (30 tetradrachm), at four drachmas each, would roughly be comparable to four months' (120 days) wages.

In the medieval period some religious institutions displayed ancient Greek coins of the island of Rhodes as specimens of the Thirty Pieces of Silver. The obverses of these coins showed a facing head of the sun god Helios, with rays projecting around the upper part of it. These rays were interpreted as a representation of the Crown of Thorns. The extracanonical Narrative of Joseph of Arimathea records that Judas was paid 30 pieces of gold, not silver.

== Theological interpretation ==
In Zechariah 11:12–13, 30 pieces of silver is the price Zechariah receives for his labour. He takes the coins and throws them "to the potter". Klaas Schilder notes that Zechariah's payment indicates an assessment of his worth, as well as his dismissal. In Exodus 21:32, 30 pieces of silver was the price of a slave, so while Zechariah calls the amount a "handsome price" (Zechariah 11:13), this could be sarcasm. Barry Webb, however, calls it as a "considerable sum of money".

Schilder suggests that these 30 pieces of silver then get "bandied back and forth by the Spirit of Prophecy." When the chief priests decide to buy a field with the returned money, Matthew says that this fulfilled "what was spoken by Jeremiah the prophet." Namely, "They took the thirty silver coins, the price set on him by the people of Israel, and they used them to buy the potter's field, as the Lord commanded me" (Matthew 27:9–10). Although many scholars see Jeremiah's name as included in error, Jeremiah's purchase of a field in Jeremiah 32 may indicate that both prophets are in mind. Craig Blomberg argues that Matthew is using typology in his quotation, rather than "any kind of single or double fulfillment of actual predictive prophecy". According to Blomberg's more charitable interpretation, Matthew is telling his readers that, "like Jeremiah and Zechariah, Jesus attempts to lead his people with a prophetic and pastoral ministry, but instead he ends up suffering innocently at their hands". William Hendriksen argues that Matthew is referring to Jeremiah 19.

Blomberg also suggests that Matthew may also be saying that "Jesus' death is a ransom, the price paid to secure a slave's freedom", and that the use of the blood money to buy a burial ground for foreigners (Matthew 27:7) may hint at the idea that "Jesus' death makes salvation possible for all the peoples of the world, including the Gentiles".

The Handy Book for Bible Readers (1877) states that:

Argurion, argenteus, denarius. This word occurs in two passages – (A) the account of the betrayal of our Lord for 'thirty pieces of silver' (Matt. xxvi. 15; xxvii. 3, 5, 6, 9). These have usually been considered to be denarii, but on no sufficient ground. The parallel passage in Zechariah (xi. 12, 13), is translated 'thirty [pieces] of silver'; but which should doubtless be read, 'thirty shekels of silver', whilst it is observable that 'thirty shekels of silver' was the price of blood to be paid in the case of a servant accidentally killed (Exodus, xxi. 32). The passage may therefore be explained as 'thirty shekels of silver', not current shekels, but tetradrachms of the Attic standard of the Greek cities of Syria and Phoenicia. These tetradrachms were common at the time of our Lord, and of them the stater was a specimen.

Some see this as one of the many parallels between Socrates and Jesus: As Plato recorded in the Apology, when Socrates was on trial for impiety and the corruption of the young, his accusers, Anytus, Meletus, and Lycon, sought the death penalty. However, Socrates's allies, Crito, Critobulus, and Apollodorus, proposed that he merely pay a fine of thirty minae.

== Relics and depiction in art ==
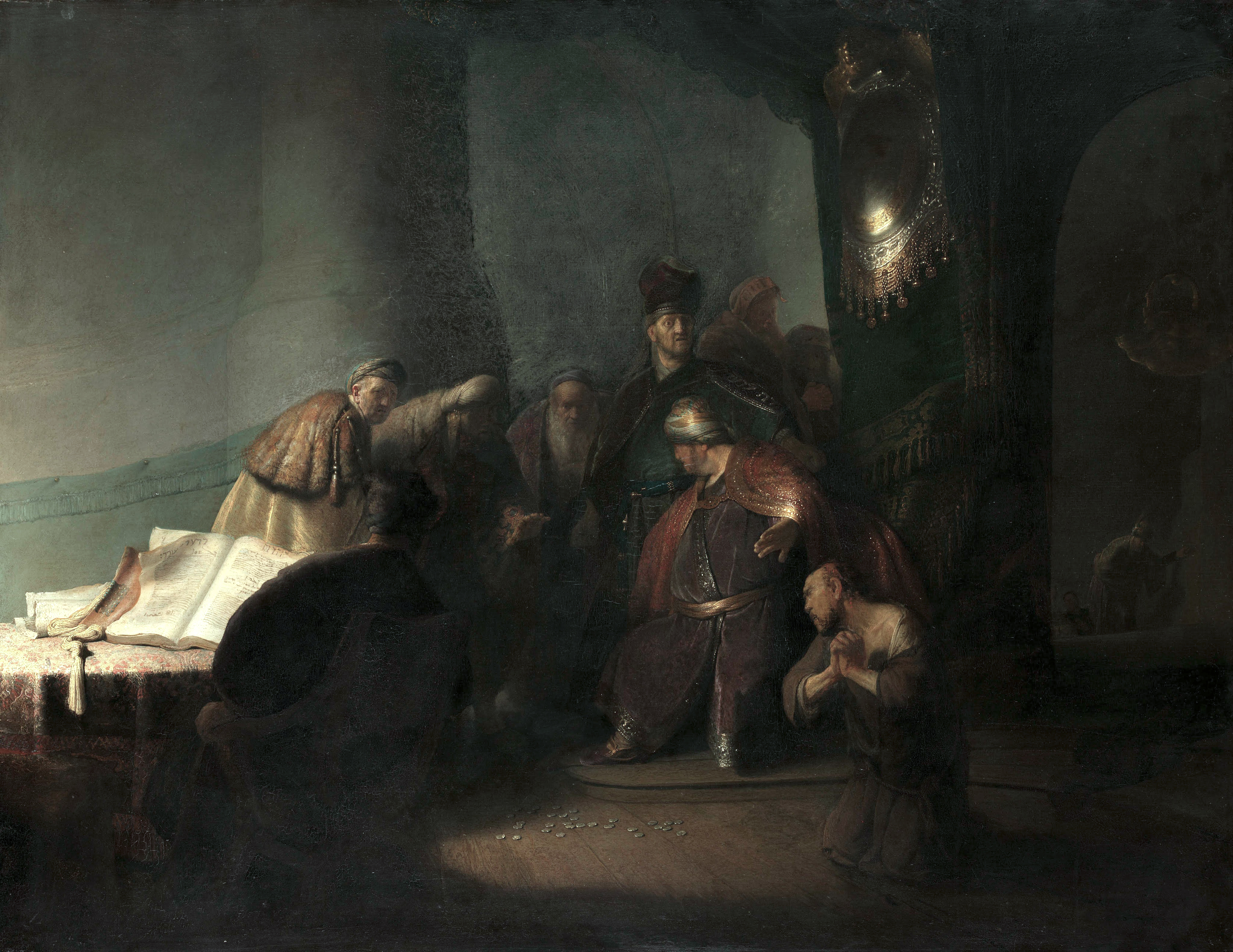
Rembrandt's Judas Returning the Thirty Silver Pieces, 1629.

Judas is often shown in narrative scenes from the Passion holding the silver in a bag or purse, where they serve as an attribute to identify him. As one of the "Instruments of the Passion" the Thirty Pieces by themselves often feature in groups of the Instruments, especially in the late Middle Ages, although they are one of the less commonly chosen elements of the group. Sometimes a money bag is used in depictions; otherwise a hand holding the coins, or two hands, showing the counting-out.

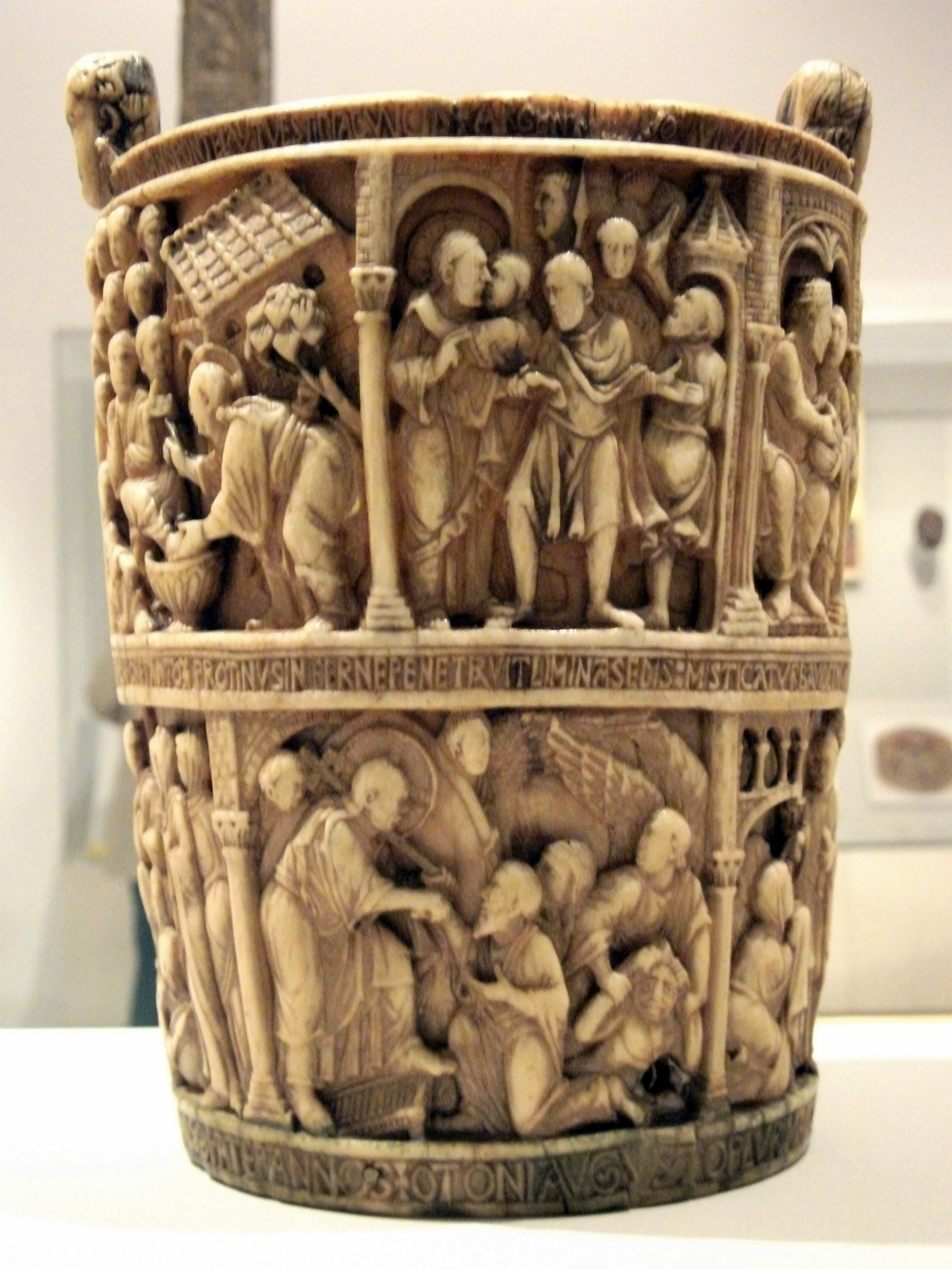
The Basilewsky Situla (920) (Victoria and Albert Museum, London)

"Judas-pennies", ancient coins said to be from the original thirty, were treated as relics in the Middle Ages, and were believed to help in difficult cases of childbirth. As a minor component of the Instruments, and one whose survival was hard to explain given the Biblical account of the use of the money, the relics and their depiction in art both appear from the 14th century, later than more important elements like the Crown of Thorns or Spear of Longinus. This was as a result of new styles of devotions, led by the Franciscans in particular, which promoted contemplation of the Passion episode by episode, as in the Stations of the Cross. The stone on which the coins were said to have been counted out was in the Lateran Palace in Rome.

A Syracusan decadrachm held at the Hunt Museum, Limerick is one such coin claimed to be one of the thirty. A quotation of St. Matthew is inscribed on the later added gold frame: Quia precium sanguinis est (Latin: "This is the price of blood"). The sculptor of the coin was allegedly Euainetos, a Greek medalist of 5th century Sicily.

== Literary references ==
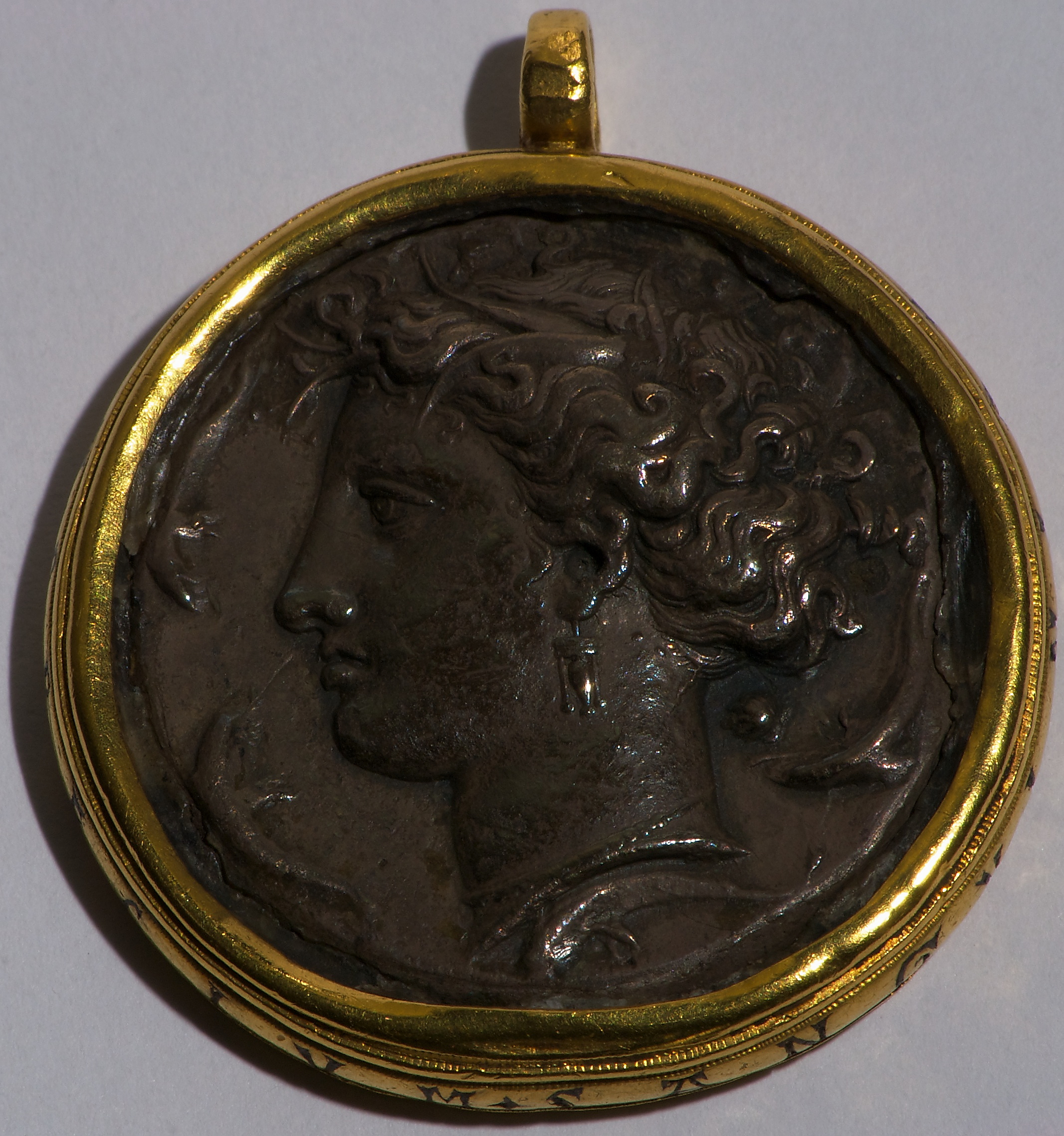
This coin is reputed to be one of the so-called thirty pieces of silver (Hunt Museum)

The 30 pieces are used in Christian literature on the betrayal of Jesus, as in the poem Thirty Pieces of Silver by William Blane:

"Thirty pieces of silver"
Burns on the traitor's brain;
"Thirty pieces of silver!
Oh! it is hellish gain!"

or as in the poem Matthew XXVII:9 by Jorge Luis Borges:

The coin fell on my hollow hand.
I could not bear it, although it was light,
and I let it fall. It was all in vain.
The other said: "There are still twenty nine."

The phrase "30 pieces of silver" is used more generally to describe a price at which people sell out. In Dostoyevsky's Crime and Punishment, it is echoed in the 30 roubles which the character Sonia earns for selling herself. In the folk-song King John and the Bishop, the bishop's answer to the riddle of how much the king is worth is 29 pieces of silver, as no king is worth more than Jesus. In Shakespeare's play Henry IV, Part 2, the mistress of Falstaff asks "and didst thou not kiss me, and bid me fetch thee thirty shillings?" The story "Treasure Trove" by F. Tennyson Jesse relates the rediscovery in modern times of the thirty pieces of silver and how they drive men to kill in varied forms including murder, manslaughter, homicide, euthanasia and suicide.

== Modern usage ==
Rhetoric alluding to the thirty pieces of silver is widely used in insults relating to betrayal with religious undertones. Various Christian denominations would reference the phrase against other denominations during the Reformation. By the time of the Dreyfus affair, the "thirty pieces" phrase accompanied antisemitic fervour against Alfred Dreyfus when he was accused of selling military secrets to Germany.

The phrase is used to accuse politicians and artists of selling out their principles or ideals, and is also used in literature as a symbol of betrayal. For example, in the aftermath of the 1975 Australian constitutional crisis, a number of residents of the street in Balmain where Governor-General John Kerr had been born sent him thirty pieces of silver, as Kerr was widely blamed for the crisis. Another usage was at the United Nations Climate Change Conference 2009, a spokesman from Tuvalu criticised the final document by saying, "It looks like we are being offered 30 pieces of silver to betray our people and our future ... Our future is not for sale."

In 2021, evangelist Franklin Graham condemned the ten Republican congressmen who supported the second impeachment of Donald Trump, suggesting that House Speaker Nancy Pelosi had promised them "thirty pieces of silver".

== See also ==
- Bargain of Judas
- Coins in the Bible
- Life of Jesus in the New Testament
- Lunaria annua – known as the Judas pennywort, as its pods look like silver pennies
- Jews, Money, Myth
- Simony
