= Garrett (name) =

Garrett's popularity in the United States
Year	Rank
2007	162
2008	161
2009	184
2010	188
2011	190
2012	213
2013	228
2014	236
2015	270
2016	309
2017	320
Source: Social Security Administration.

Garrett is a surname and given name of Germanic and of Old French origins. It is one of the many baptismal surnames to have been derived from the popular given names of Gerardus, Gerard and Gerald in 12th-century England. Both of these names were taken to Britain by the invading Normans and are the Old French versions of ancient Germanic personal names. The name Gerard (or Germanic: Gerhard) is composed of the Germanic elements gēr or gār (meaning 'spear') and hard ('brave', 'hard' or 'strong'), while Gerald is composed of again gēr or gār ('spear') and wald ('to rule'). Although Garrett remains predominantly only a last name in the UK, elsewhere in the English-speaking world it is also a common first name (e.g. in the United States).

Other surnames derived from Gerardus, Gerard and Gerald include: Gerrard, Garratt, Garret, Garred, Garrad, Garrard, Garriott, Garrod, Jarrett, Jared, Jarratt, Jarrard, and Jerrold.

== People with the given name ==
- Gerald FitzGerald, 8th Earl of Kildare (fl. 1477–1513), aka "Garrett the Great", Lord Deputy of Ireland
- Garrett Acton (born 1998), American professional baseball pitcher
- Garrett Adelstein (born 1986), American professional poker player
- Garrett Arbelbide (1909–1983), American football and baseball player and football coach
- Garrett Atkins (born 1979), American former Major League Baseball third baseman
- Garrett Baumann (born 2004), American baseball player
- Garrett Berry (born 2003), American racing driver
- Garrett Birkhoff (1911–1996), American mathematician
- Garrett Bradbury (born 1995), American football player
- Garrett Bradley (politician) (born 1970), current representative in the Massachusetts House of Representatives for the 3rd Plymouth district
- Garrett Brock Trapnell (1938–1993), con man, bank robber, and aircraft hijacker
- Garrett Broshuis (born 1981), former professional baseball player
- Garrett Brown (born 1942), American cinematographer
- Garrett Brown Jr. (born 1943), former federal judge and attorney
- Garrett Burhenn (born 1999), American baseball player
- Garrett Burnett (1975–2022), Canadian professional ice hockey player
- Garrett Byrne (Irish politician) (1829–1897), Irish nationalist
- Garrett Byrnes (born 1971), American composer
- Garrett Caldwell (born 1973), American-born Canadian former soccer player
- Garrett Camp (born 1978), Canadian entrepreneur
- Garrett Caples (born 1972), American poet
- Garrett Celek (born 1988), American football tight end
- Garrett Clayton (born 1991), American actor, singer, and dancer
- Garrett Cochran (1876–1918), American football player and coach
- Garrett Davis (1801–1872), U.S. Senator and Representative from Kentucky
- Garrett Dellinger (born 2002), American football player
- Garrett Dickerson (born 1995), American football player
- Garrett Dillon (1640–1696), Irish judge, politician and soldier
- Garrett Droppers (1860–1927), American academic and diplomat
- Garrett Eckbo (1910–2000), American landscape architect
- Garrett Epps (born 1950), American legal scholar, novelist, and journalist
- Garrett Festerling (born 1986), professional ice hockey forward
- Garret FitzGerald (1926–2011), Taoiseach of Ireland from 1981 to 1982 and 1982 to 1987
- Garrett Ford Jr. (born 1970), American football running back
- Garrett Ford Sr. (born 1945), assistant athletics director at West Virginia University
- Garrett Fort (1900–1945), American short story writer, playwright, and Hollywood screenwriter
- Garrett Gardner, American singer and songwriter
- Garrett Geros (born 1999), American para-snowboarder
- Garrett Giemont (born 1959), strength and conditioning coach
- Garrett Gilbert (born 1991), American football quarterback
- Garrett Gilkey (born 1990), American football offensive guard
- Garrett Glaser (born 1953), retired American news reporter
- Garrett K. Gomez (born 1972), American thoroughbred jockey
- Garrett Graff (born 1981), American editor-in-chief and instructor
- Garrett Graham (born 1986), American football tight end
- Garrett Grayson (born 1991), American football quarterback
- Garrett Greene (born 2001), American football player
- Garrett Gruener, founder of Ask.com and a co-founder of Alta Partners
- Garrett Haake (born 1984–1985), American journalist
- Garrett Hammond, American drummer
- Garrett Hardin (1915–2003), American ecologist
- Garrett Hartley (born 1986), American football placekicker
- Garrett Heath (born 1985), American middle-distance and distance runner
- Garrett Hedlund (born 1984), American actor
- Garrett Hilbert (born 1987), American internet personality and member of Dude Perfect
- Garrett Hines (born 1969), American bobsledder
- Garrett Hongo (born 1941), Yonsei, fourth-generation Japanese American academic and poet
- Garrett Howard (1899–1995), Irish hurler
- Garrett Jackson (born 1991), American basketball coach and former player
- Garrett Jernigan, American physicist and astronomer
- Garrett Johnson (born 1984), American shot putter
- Garrett Jones (born 1981), American professional baseball outfielder and first baseman
- Garrett Kelleher, non-executive director of Lightstream Pictures
- Garrett Klugh (born 1974), American rower
- Garrett Lerner, American television writer and producer
- Garrett Lewis (1935–2013), American set decorator
- Garrett Lindholm (born 1988), American football placekicker
- Antony Garrett Lisi (born 1968), American theoretical physicist
- Garrett List (1943–2019), American trombonist, vocalist, and composer
- Garrett Love (born 1988), Republican member of the Kansas Senate
- Garrett Lowney (born 1979), American Greco-Roman wrestler
- Garrett Lucash (born 1978), American pair skater
- Garrett Lynch (born 1977), Irish new media artist
- Garrett MacKeen (born 1994), Canadian ice dancer
- Garrett Mason (born 1985), American politician
- Garrett Mattingly (1900–1962), professor of European history at Columbia University
- Garrett McGhin (born 1995), American football player
- Garrett McIntyre (born 1984), American football linebacker
- Garrett McNamara (born 1967), American professional big wave surfer and extreme waterman
- Garrett Miller (rower) (born 1977), American rower
- Garrett Miller (politician) (1770–1840), Nova Scotia politician
- Garrett Mills (born 1983), American football tight end
- Garrett Mitchell (ice hockey) (born 1991), Canadian ice hockey forward
- Garrett Mock (born 1983), American former professional baseball pitcher
- Garrett Morgan (1877–1963), African-American inventor; created the safety hood smoke protection device and the traffic signal
- Garrett Morris (born 1937), African-American comedian/actor and Saturday Night Live alumnus
- Garrett Neff (born 1984), American model
- Garrett Nelson (born 2000), American football player
- Garrett Nussmeier (born 2002), American football player
- Garrett Oliver (born 1962), American brewer and beer author
- Garrett Olson (born 1983), American former professional baseball pitcher
- Garrett Phelan (born 1965), artist from Dublin, Ireland
- Garrett J. Pendergrast (1802–1862), officer in the US Navy; served at the beginning of the American Civil War
- Garrett Raboin (born 1985), retired American professional ice hockey player
- Garrett Reisman (born 1968), American astronaut
- Garrett Reynolds (born 1987), American football guard and tackle
- Garrett Richards (born 1988), American professional baseball pitcher
- Garrett Richter (born 1950), Republican member of the Florida Senate
- Garrett Rivas (born 1985), American former football kicker
- Garrett Roe (born 1988), American professional ice hockey left winger
- Garrett Schifsky (born 2003), American ice hockey player
- Garrett Scott (born 1991), American football offensive tackle
- Garrett P. Serviss (1851–1929), American astronomer, popularizer of astronomy, and early science fiction writer
- Garrett Sinnott (born 1987), Irish sportsperson
- Garrett Smith (born 1967), former U.S. soccer defender
- Garrett Stafford (born 1980), professional ice hockey defenceman
- Garrett Stephenson (born 1972), retired Major League Baseball pitcher
- Garrett Stubbs (born 1993), American baseball catcher
- Garrett Swasey (1971–2015), American ice skater and slain police officer
- Garrett Temple (born 1986), American professional basketball guard
- Garrett Uhlenbrock (born 1964), punk rock musician and songwriter
- Garrett Wang (born 1968), American actor
- Garrett Weber-Gale (born 1985), American swimmer
- Garrett Williams (born 2001), American football player
- Garrett Willis (born 1973), American professional golfer
- Garrett Wilson (born 2000), American football wide receiver
- Garrett Wilson (ice hockey) (born 1991), Canadian professional ice hockey winger
- Garrett L. Withers (1884–1953), Democrat, represented Kentucky
- Garrett Wittels (born 1990), American baseball player
- Garrett Wolfe (born 1984), American former football running back
- Garrett Zuercher (born 1979), American deaf actor, director, and playwright

== People with the surname ==
- Garrett (surname)

== Fictional characters ==
- Edna Garrett, a character on the TV series The Facts of Life and Diff'rent Strokes
- Kelly Garrett (Charlie's Angels), a character on the 1976–81 TV series Charlie's Angels
- Garrett, a character from the Twilight book and film series
- The eponymous protagonist of Glen Cook's Garrett P.I. series of fantasy novels.
- Garrett (character), from the Thief video game series
- Garrett Breedlove, an astronaut played by Jack Nicholson in Terms of Endearment
- Rachel Garrett, captain of the Enterprise NCC-1701-C in "Yesterday's Enterprise"
- Garrett "The Garbage Man" Garrison, a character from A Minecraft Movie
- Garrett (Quest for Camelot), a cartoon character in the 1998 animated film Quest for Camelot

== See also ==
- Garratt (surname)
- Jarrett (surname)
- Garret (given name)
- Garett
- Garet (disambiguation)
