= Bryce Ford-Wheaton =

American football player (born 2000)

Profile
- Position: Wide receiver

Personal information
- Born: March 9, 2000 (age 26); Martinsburg, West Virginia, U.S.
- Listed height: 6 ft 4 in (1.93 m)
- Listed weight: 220 lb (100 kg)

Career information
- High school: Holly Springs (Holly Springs, North Carolina)
- College: West Virginia (2018–2022)
- NFL draft: 2023: undrafted

Career history
- New York Giants (2023–2025)

Awards and highlights
- Second-team All-Big 12 (2022)
- Stats at Pro Football Reference

Bryce Ford-Wheaton (born March 9, 2000) is an American professional football wide receiver. He played college football for the West Virginia Mountaineers before signing with the New York Giants as an undrafted free agent in 2023.

== Early life ==
Ford-Wheaton was born on March 9, 2000, in Fuquay-Varina, North Carolina. He attended Holly Springs High School and played track and football, being one of the state's best wide receivers in the latter. He also played as a defensive back and was ranked as a three-star recruit. Ford-Wheaton committed to play college football at West Virginia (WVU) out of 12 FBS offers, following in the footsteps of his grandfather Garrett Ford Sr. and uncle Garrett Ford Jr.

== College career ==
As a true freshman at West Virginia in 2018, Ford-Wheaton redshirted, only appearing in their game against Baylor. The following year, he appeared in 11 games, starting two, and posted 12 receptions for 201 yards and two touchdowns, one of which went for 50 yards against Kansas State. In 2020, he started all nine games in the COVID-19-shortened season, posting 27 receptions, the fourth-highest total on the team, for 416 yards with three scores. He became that year the first West Virginia player in history to wear the jersey number "0", and additionally was the recipient of the Iron Mountaineer Award, given to the best performers in the offseason strength and conditioning program.

In 2021, Ford-Wheaton placed second on the team with 42 catches for 575 yards and three touchdowns, one of which was a historic catch against Iowa State that helped WVU defeat their conference opponent. He was a fourth-team all-conference choice after the season and additionally was named to his school's academic honor roll bearing the name of his grandfather. Ford-Wheaton in 2022 posted 62 receptions, scoring seven touchdowns, while gaining 675 yards off his catches, placing first on the team in the first two categories while second in the latter. He was a second-team All-Big 12 Conference selection and declared for the NFL draft after the season.

== Professional career ==
Pre-draft measurables
Height	Weight	Arm length	Hand span	40-yard dash	10-yard split	20-yard split	20-yard shuttle	Three-cone drill	Vertical jump	Broad jump
6 ft 3 3/4 in (1.92 m)	221 lb (100 kg)	33 1/2 in (0.85 m)	9 3/8 in (0.24 m)	4.38 s	1.54 s	2.58 s	4.15 s	6.97 s	41.0 in (1.04 m)	10 ft 9 in (3.28 m)
All values from NFL Combine

Ford-Wheaton impressed at the NFL Scouting Combine and was projected to be drafted in the 2023 NFL draft.

=== New York Giants ===
He was signed by the New York Giants as an undrafted free agent on May 5, 2023. He was placed on injured reserve on August 27, after suffering a torn ACL in Week 3 of the preseason game against New York Jets.

On October 6, 2024, Ford-Wheaton scored his first NFL touchdown on a game-clinching 60-yard return of a blocked field goal in a 29–20 victory over the Seattle Seahawks.

On July 27, 2025, during training camp, Ford-Wheaton suffered a season-ending Achilles tear.

On May 12, 2026, Ford-Wheaton was fully cleared from his Achilles injury, with the expectation of holding workouts with multiple NFL teams. On July 9, Ford-Wheaton worked out with the Philadelphia Eagles at mandatory minicamp. On August 12, Ford-Wheaton worked out with the Baltimore Ravens.
