= Garratt (surname) =

Garratt is a surname. Notable people with the surname include:

- Chris Garratt, artist of the Biff (cartoon) team
- Fred Garratt (1888–1967), English footballer
- Herbert William Garratt (1864–1913), English mechanical engineer, inventor of the Garratt locomotive
- Humphry Garratt (1898–1974), English cricketer
- Martin Garratt (born 1980), English footballer
- Nick Garratt, Australian rowing coach
- Owen Garratt (born 1968), Canadian artist and musician
- Steve Garratt (born 1953), English cricket umpire
- Wayne Garratt (1968–1992), English speedway rider

== See also ==
- Garrat (disambiguation)
- Garrett
- Garret (given name)
