= Garrett =

Garrett may refer to:

== Places in the United States ==
- Garrett, Illinois, a village
- Garrett, Indiana, a city
- Garrett, Floyd County, Kentucky, an unincorporated community
- Garrett, Meade County, Kentucky, an unincorporated community
- Garrett, Missouri, a ghost town
- Garrett, Pennsylvania, a borough
- Garrett, Texas, a town
- Garrett, Washington, a census-designated place
- Garrett, Wyoming, an unincorporated community
- Garrett County, Maryland

== Businesses ==
- Garrett AiResearch, a former manufacturer of turbochargers and turbine engines
  - Garrett Motion, manufacturer of turbochargers for ground vehicles
- Richard Garrett & Sons, a manufacturer of steam engines and agricultural machinery

== Other uses ==
- Garrett (name), lists of people and fictional characters with the given name or surname
- Garrett-Evangelical Theological Seminary, a graduate school of theology affiliated with the United Methodist Church

== See also ==
- Garratt locomotive, a type of steam locomotive
- Jarrett (surname)
- Garet (disambiguation)
- Garrott (disambiguation)
