= Garrett Ford =

Garrett Ford may refer to:

- Garrett Ford Sr. (1945–2025), athletics administrator at West Virginia University and former All-American tailback
- Garrett Ford Jr. (born 1970), former West Virginia tailback, son of the above
- William L. Crawford (1911–1984), American publisher and editor, used the pseudonym Garret Ford

== See also ==
- Garrett Fort (1900–1945), American short story writer, playwright, and Hollywood screenwriter
