= Garret (given name) =

Garret is a given name. It is an alternate spelling of Garrett. Notable people with the given name include:

- Garret Anderson (1972–2026), American baseball player
- Garret Chachere (born 1969), American football coach and former player
- Garret Dillahunt (born 1964), American actor
- Garret FitzGerald (1926–2011), Irish Fine Gael politician
- Garret Graves (born 1972), the United States representative from Louisiana's 6th congressional district
- Garret Greenfield, American football player
- Garret Hobart (1844–1899), the 24th Vice President of the United States
- Garret McGuire, American football coach and former player
- Garret Pettis (born 1989), a retired American soccer player who recently played for Harrisburg City Islanders
- Garret Rangel, American football player
- Garret Ross (born 1992), American professional ice hockey player
- Garret Siler (born 1986), American professional basketball player
- Garret Sparks (born 1993), American professional ice hockey goaltender
- Garret D. Wall (1783–1850), a military officer and politician
- Garret Wallow (born 1999), American football player
- Garret Wellesley, 7th Earl Cowley (1934–2016)
- Garret Wesley, 1st Earl of Mornington (1735–1781)

== See also ==
- Garratt (surname)
- Garet (disambiguation) – people
- Garrett (disambiguation)
- Garrett (name) – history of the name
- Jarrett (surname)
