= Garett =

Garett is an English and an Irish masculine given name. Notable people with the name include:

- Garett Bembridge (born 1981), Canadian ice hockey player
- Garett Bischoff (born 1984), American professional wrestler
- Garett Bolles (born 1992), American football player
- Garett Grist (born 1995), Canadian racing driver
- Garett Hickling (1970–2025), Canadian wheelchair rugby player
- Garett Jones (born 1970), American economist and author
- Garett Maggart (born 1969), American actor
- Garett Nolan (born 1997), American actor, model, and social media personality
- Garett Whiteley (born 1980), American mixed martial artist

== See also ==
- Garette Ratliff Henson (born 1980), American actor
- Garret (given name)
- Garrett (name)
