= Garrott =

Garrott may refer to:

== Given name ==
- Garrott Kuzzy (born 1982), American cross-country skier

== Surname ==
- Idamae Garrott (1916-1999), American politician in Maryland
- Isham Warren Garrott (c. 1816-1863), Confederate States colonel
- James H. Garrott (1897-1991), American architect in Los Angeles

== Other ==
- Garrott House, historic house of Batesville, Alabama

== See also ==
- Garot, Korean traditional clothing
- Garrote, rope used to strangle a person
- Garrett (disambiguation)
