= All Saints' Church, Stanton Hill =

Coordinates: 53°08′32″N 01°16′35″W

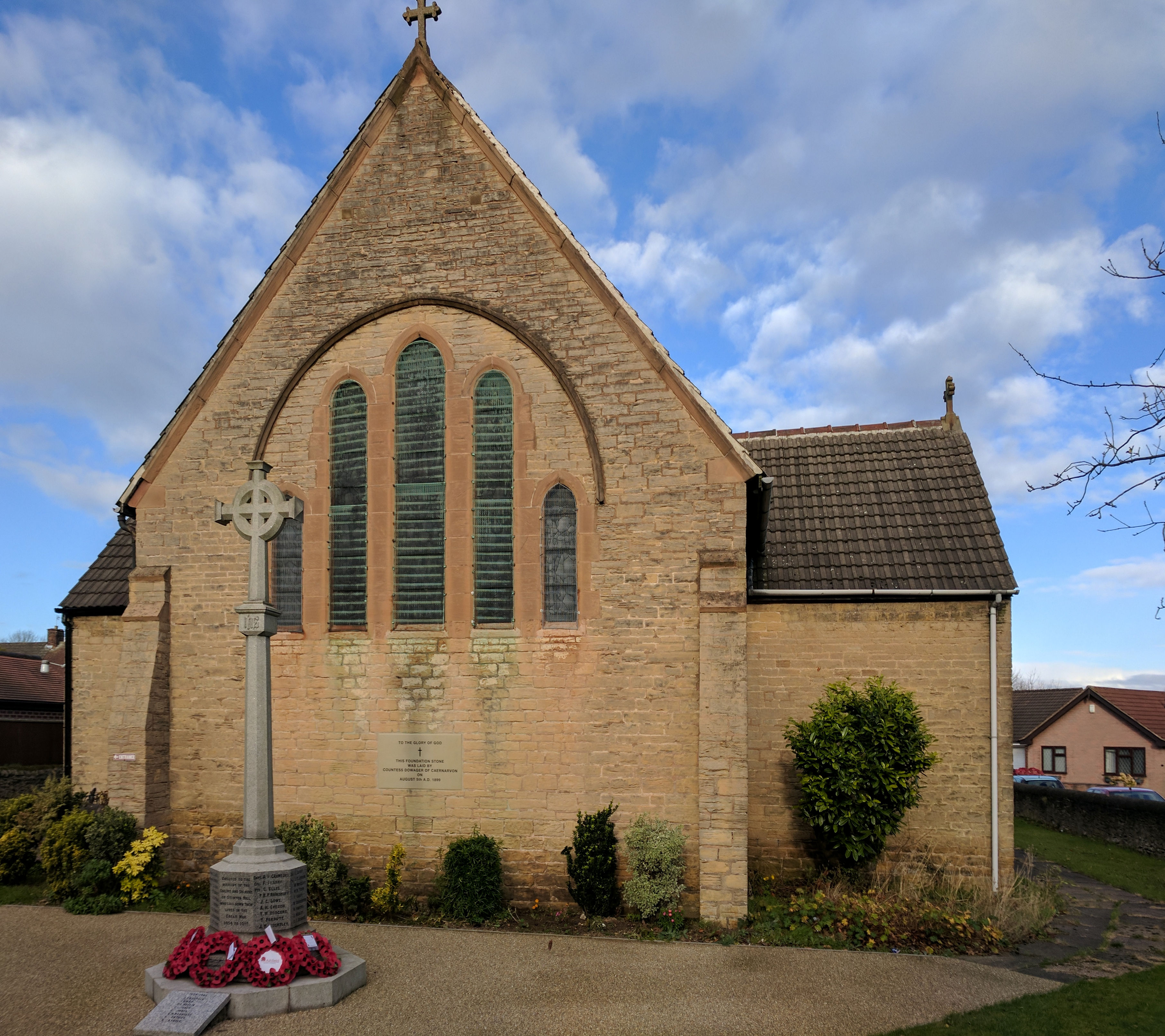
- All Saints' Church, Stanton Hill
- Denomination: Church of England
- Churchmanship: Broad Church

History
- Dedication: All Saints

Administration
- Province: York
- Diocese: Southwell and Nottingham
- Parish: Skegby

All Saints' Church, Stanton Hill is a parish church in the Church of England in Stanton Hill, Nottinghamshire. The church is not a listed building, however, Stanton Hill War Memorial, in front of the Church is Grade II listed by the Department for Digital, Culture, Media and Sport as it is of special architectural or historic interest.

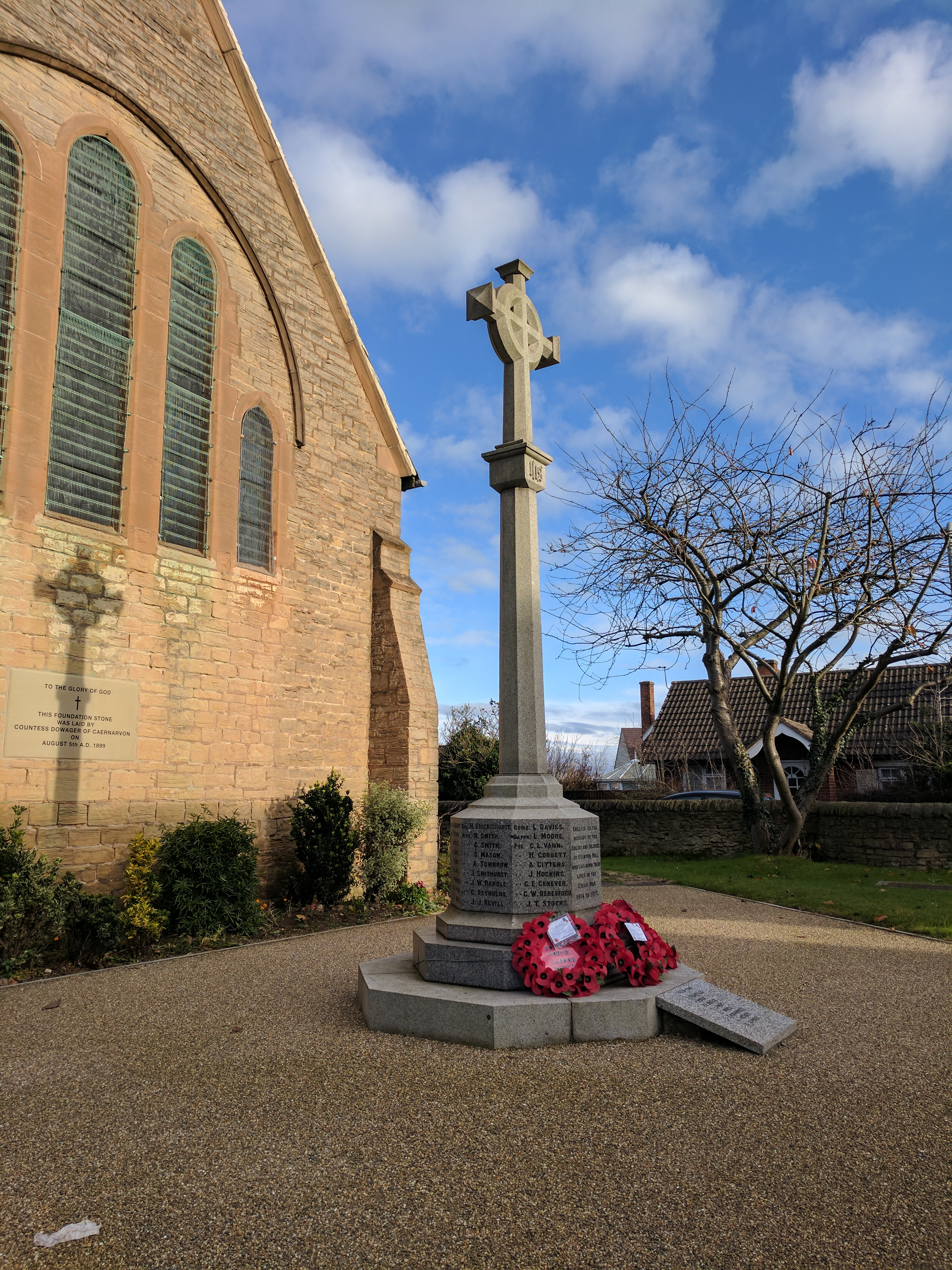
Stanton Hill War Memorial

== History ==
The church dates from 1899 and the foundation stone was laid by the Countess of Carnaervon.

== Parish structure ==
It is a daughter church to St. Andrew's Church, Skegby.

== Gallery ==
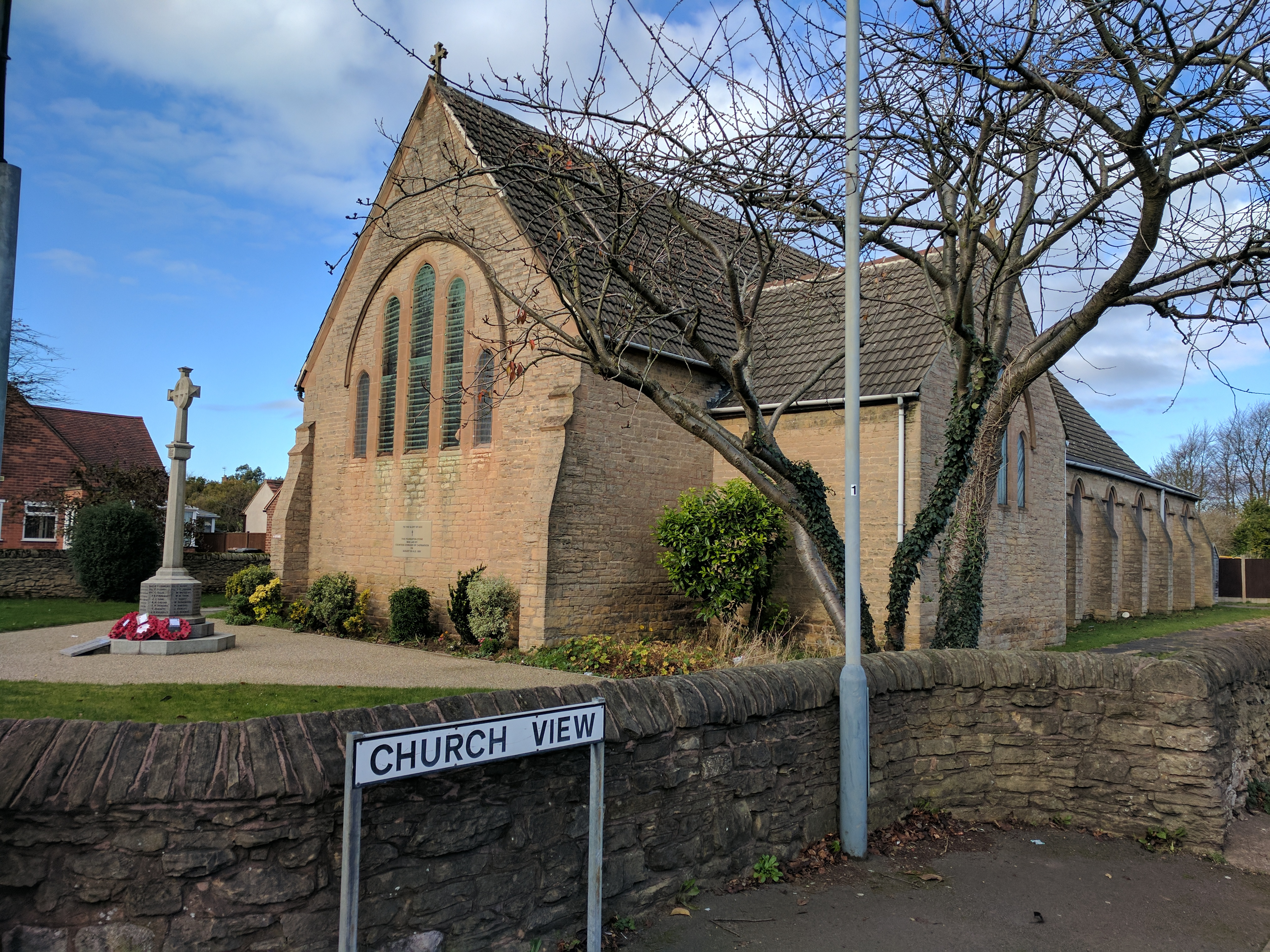
All Saints' Church, Fackley Road, Stanton Hill

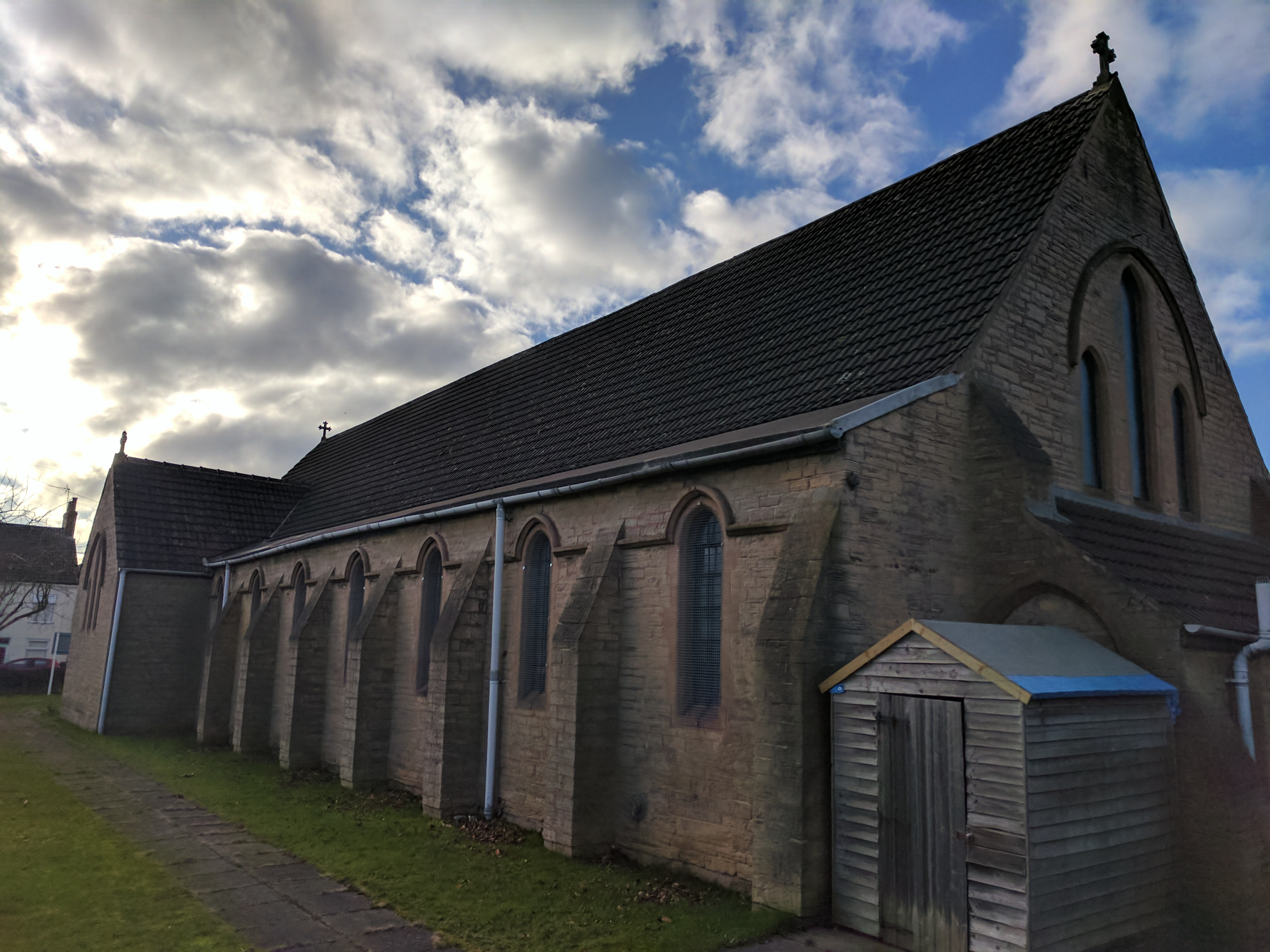
All Saints' Church, Fackley Road, Stanton Hill

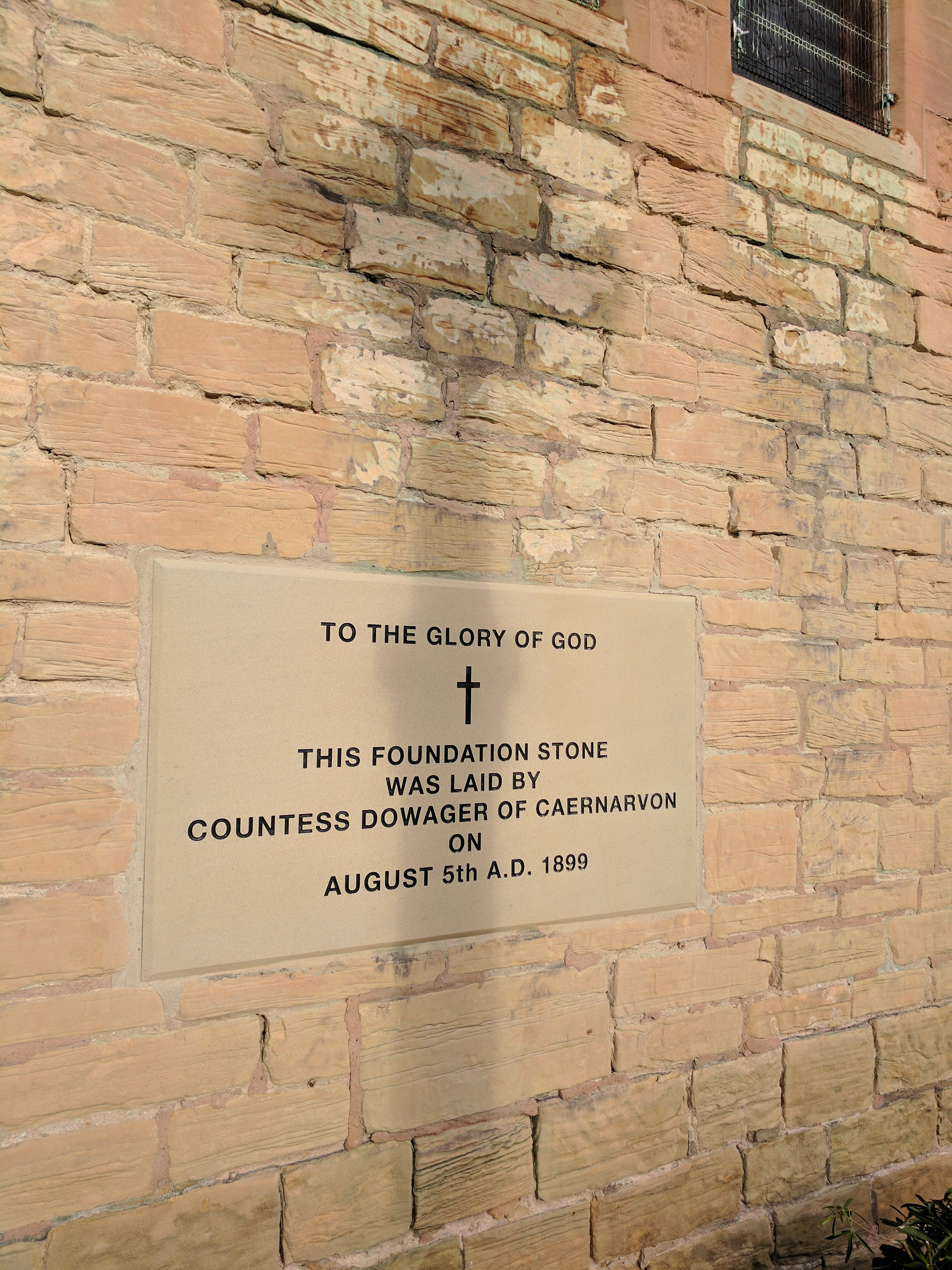
All Saints' Church, Fackley Road, Stanton Hill

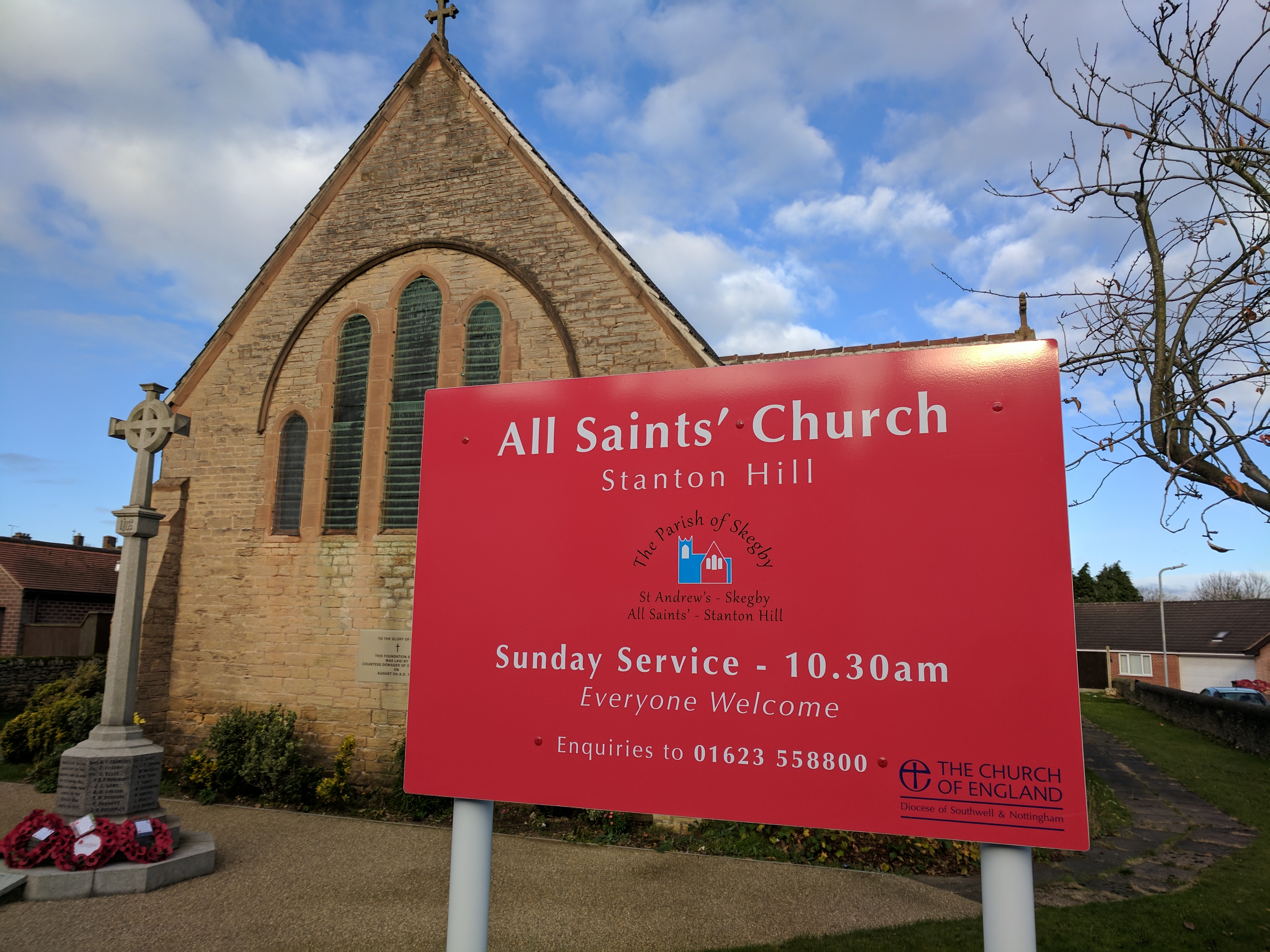
Church sign of All Saints' Church, Fackley Road, Stanton Hill

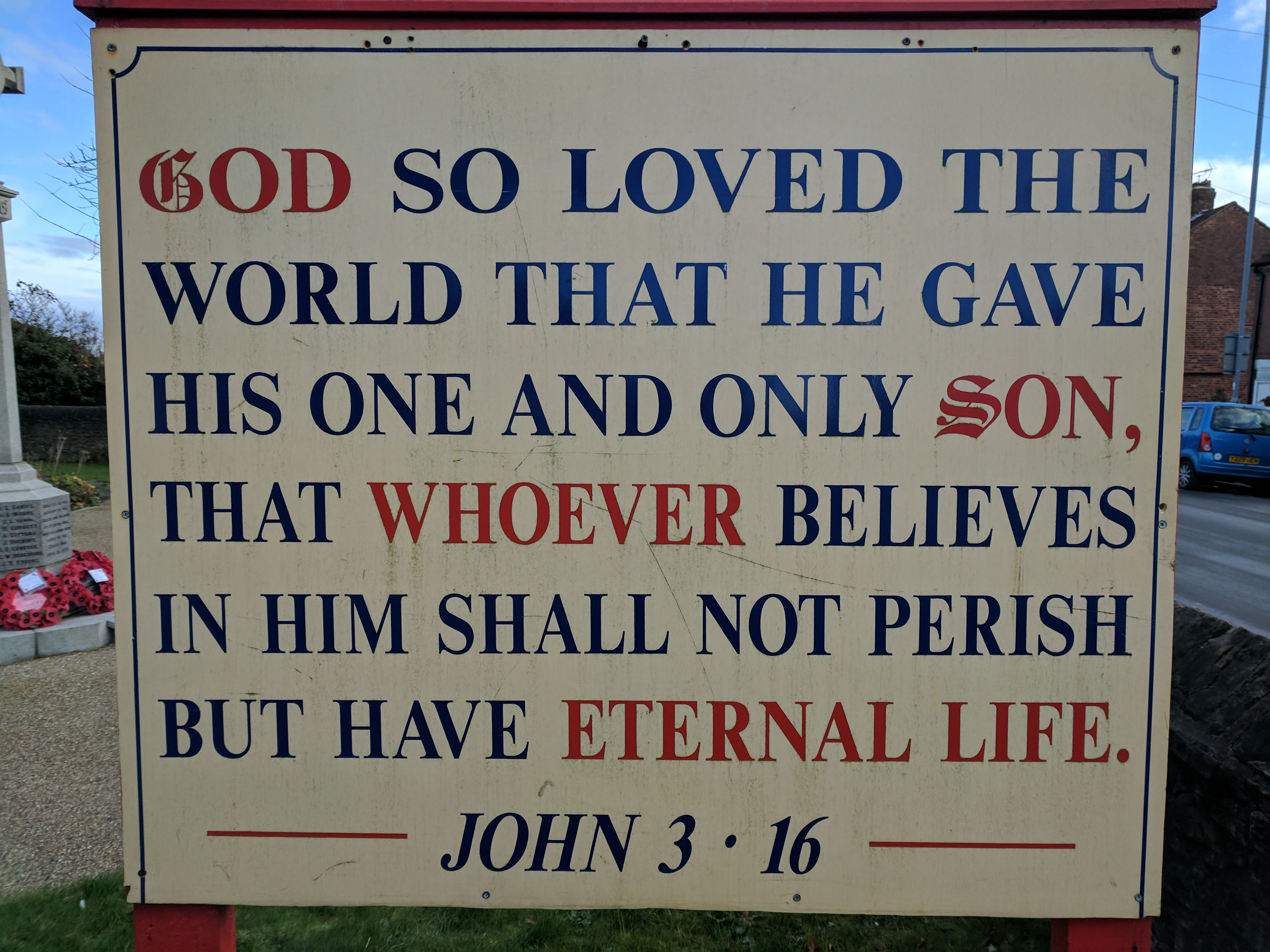
Church sign of All Saints' Church, Fackley Road, Stanton Hill

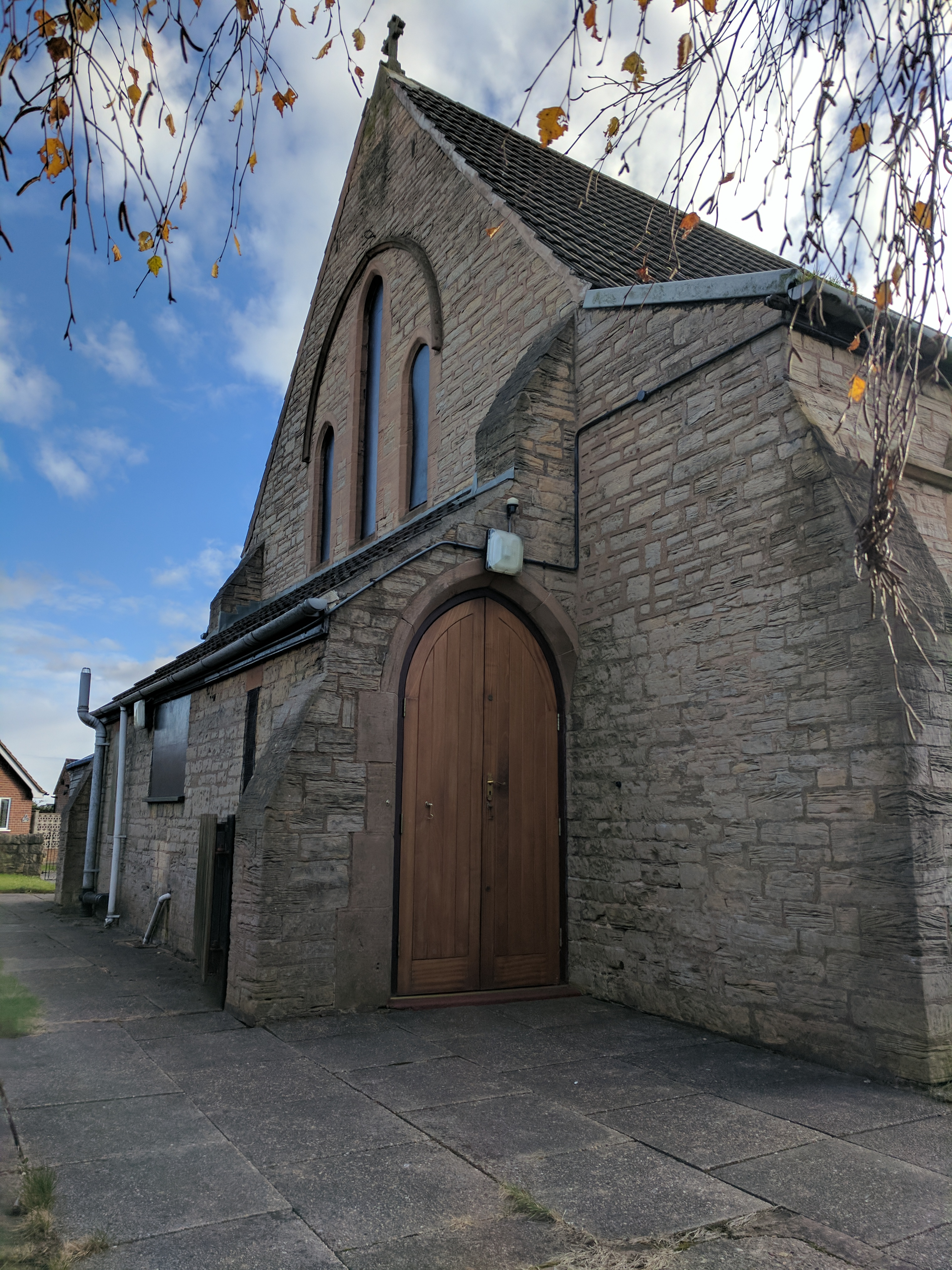
All Saints' Church, Fackley Road, Stanton Hill

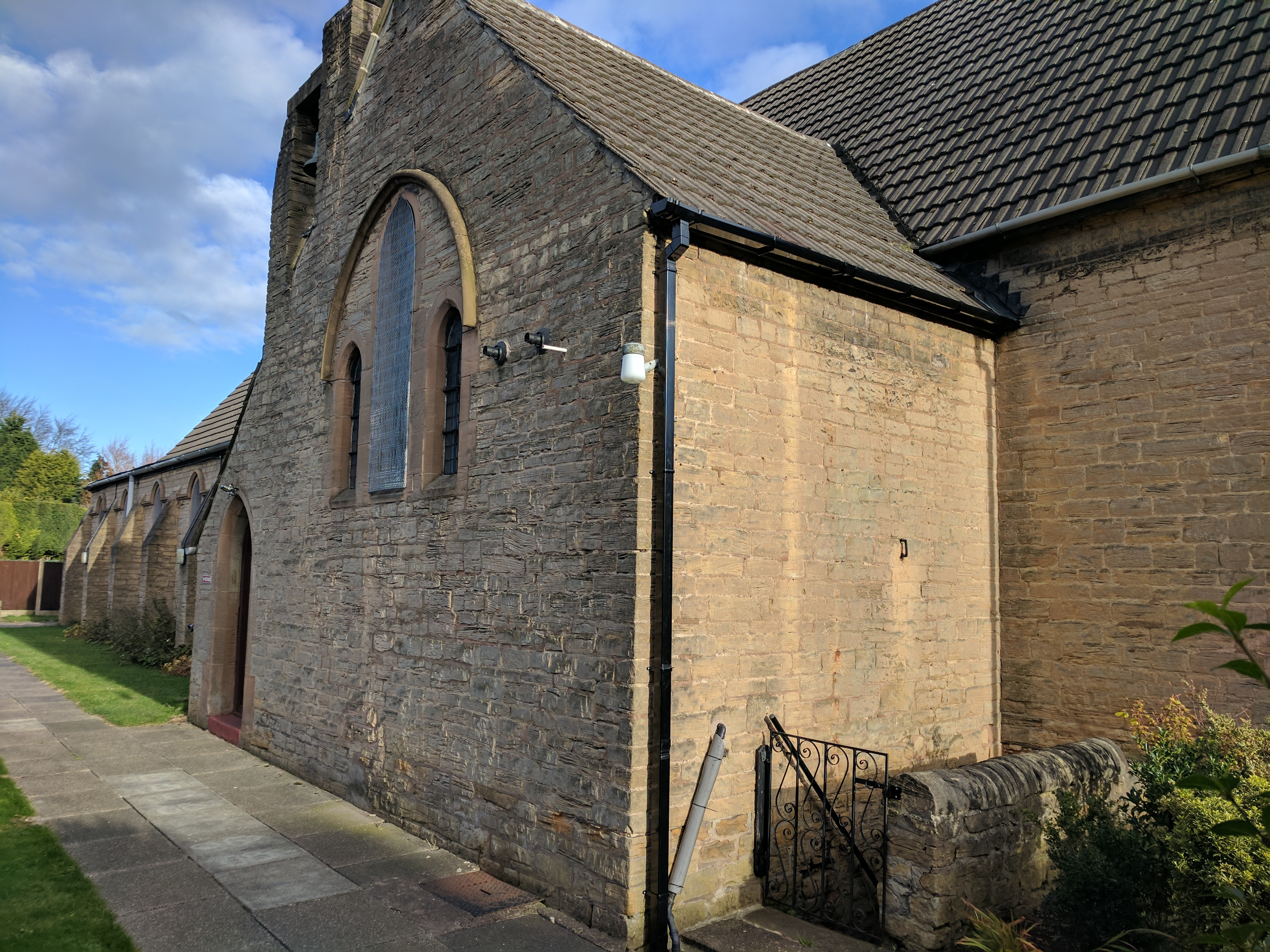
All Saints' Church, Fackley Road, Stanton Hill

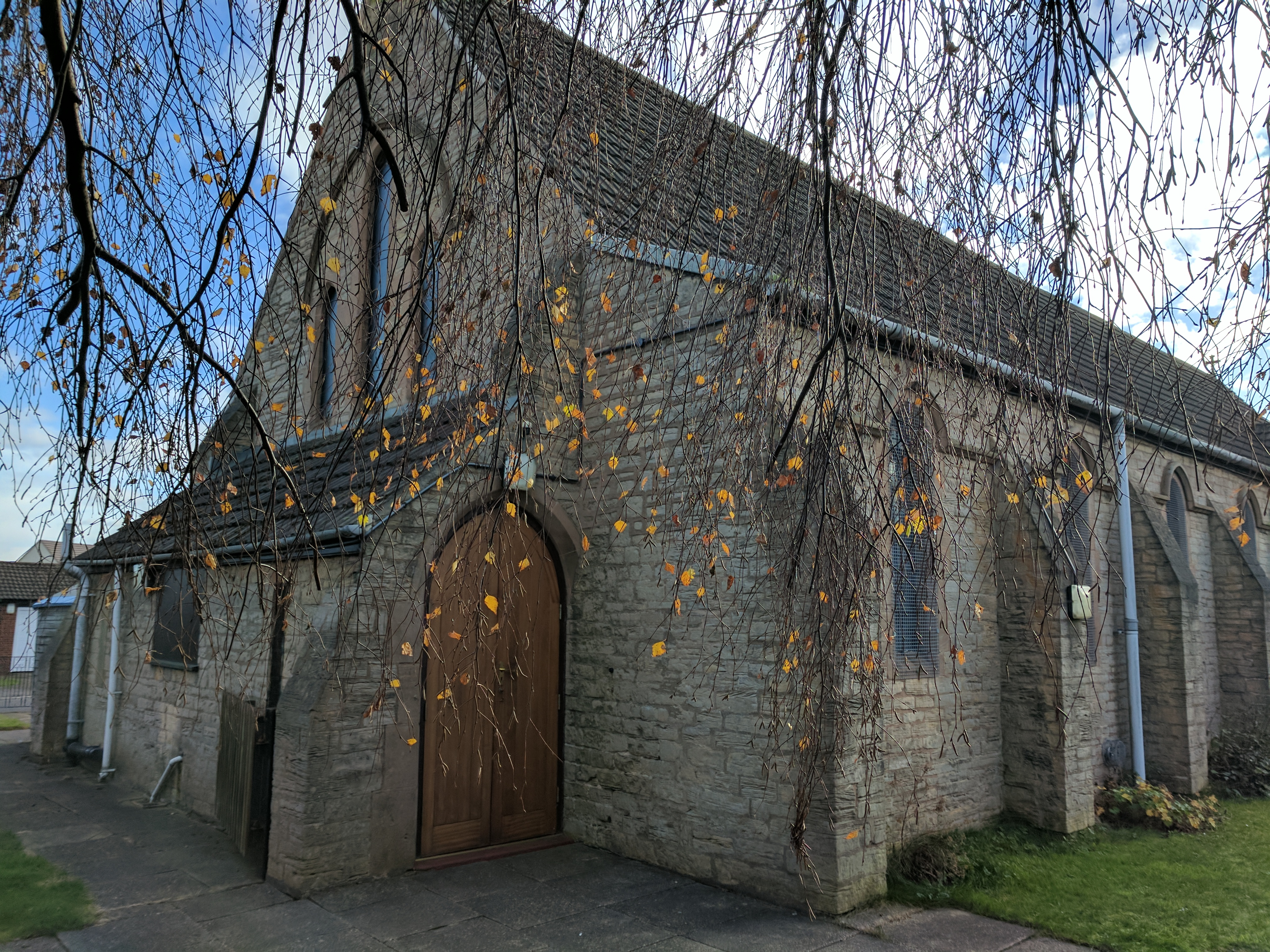
All Saints' Church, Fackley Road, Stanton Hill

Stanton Hill War Memorial, in front of All Saints' Church

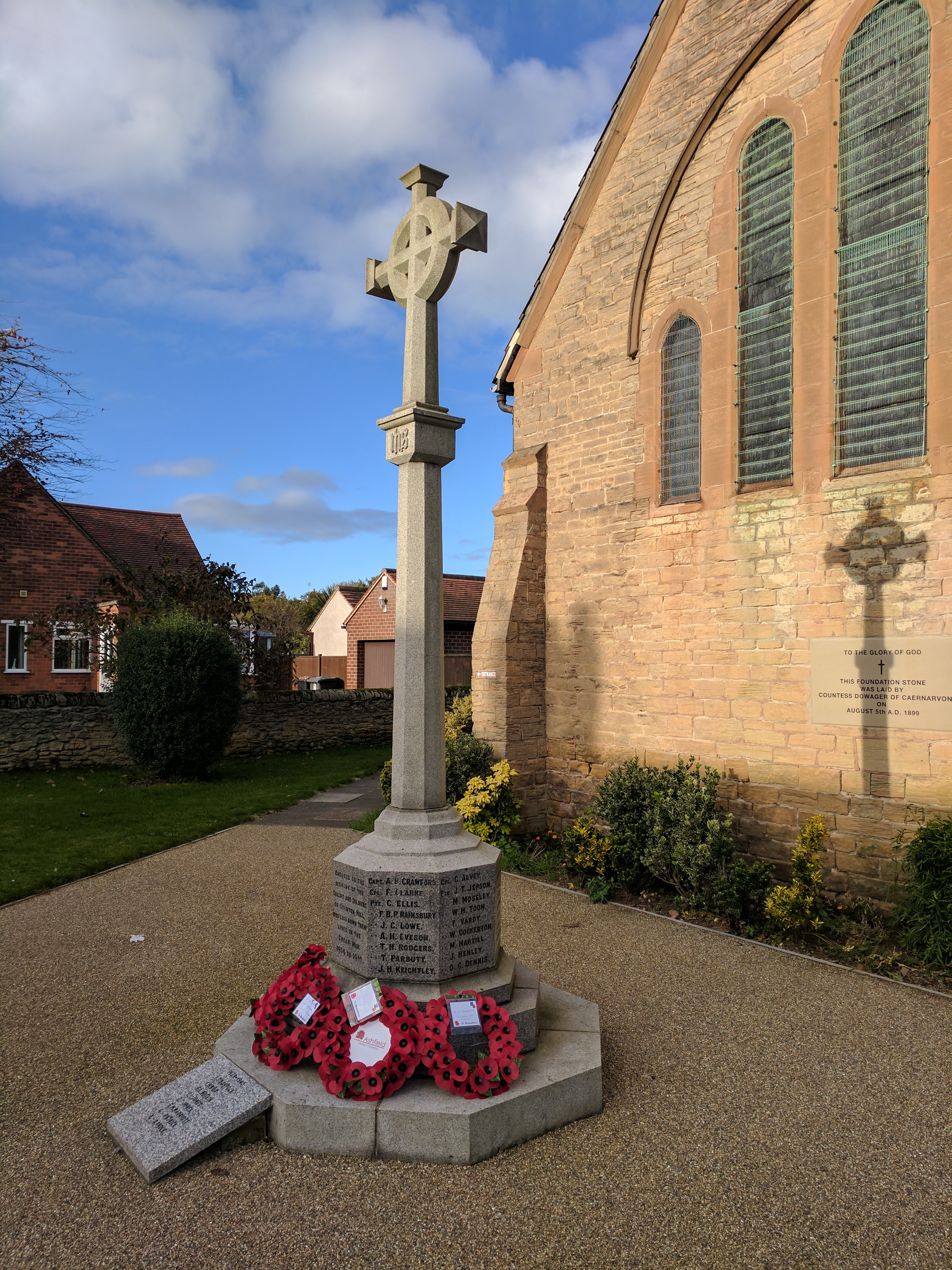
Stanton Hill War Memorial, in front of All Saints' Church

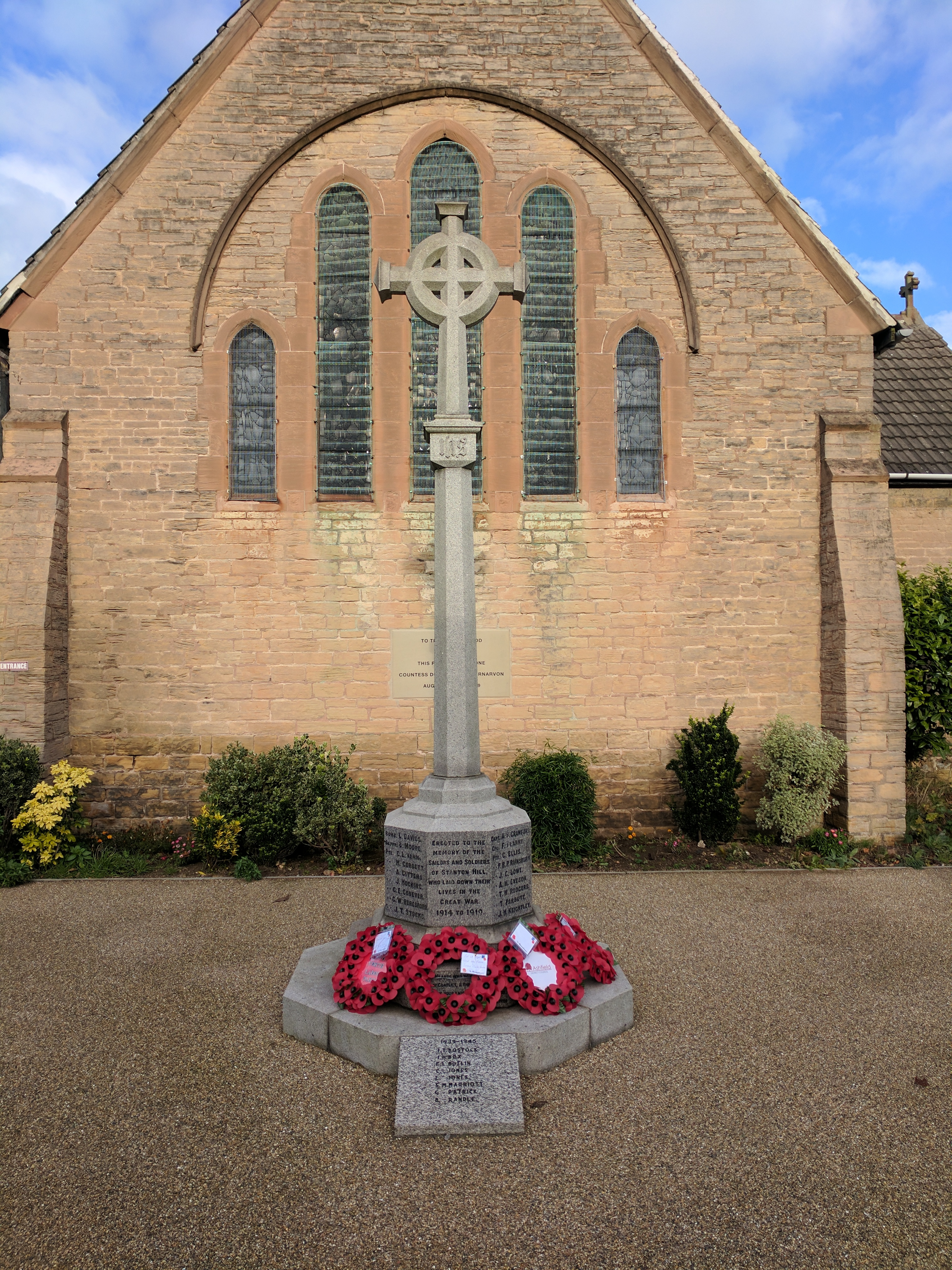
Stanton Hill War Memorial, in front of All Saints' Church

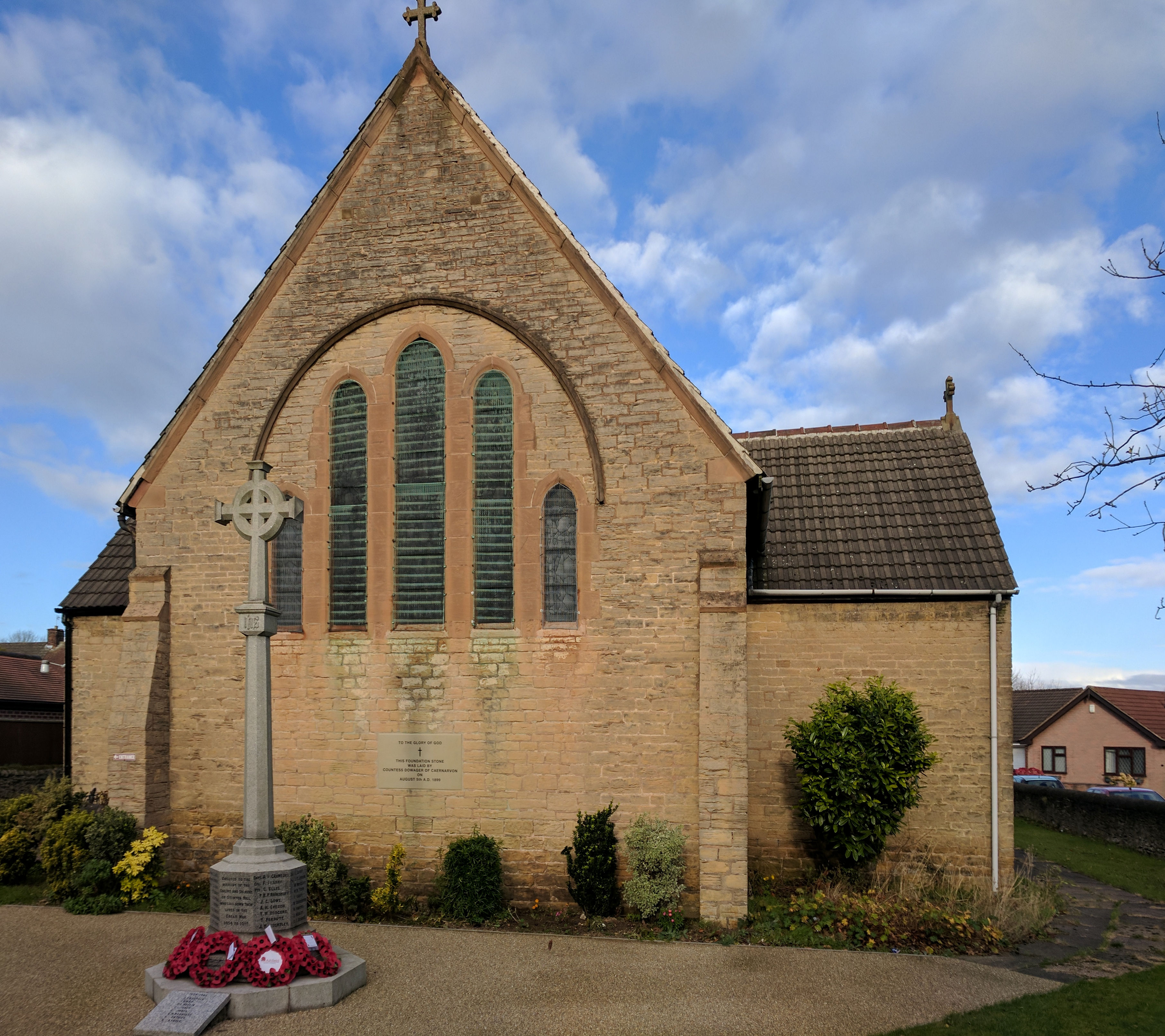
Stanton Hill War Memorial, in front of All Saints' Church

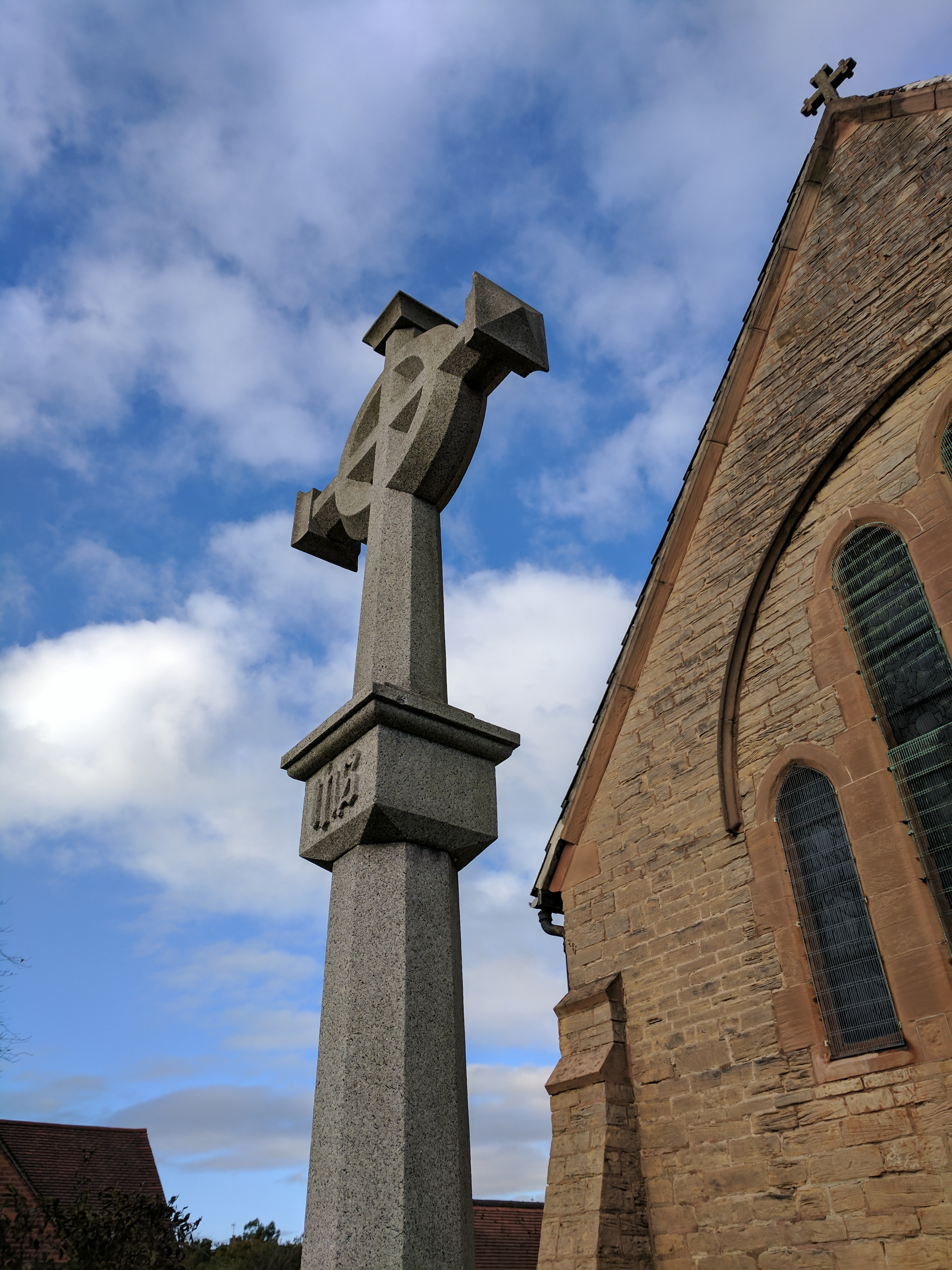
Stanton Hill War Memorial, in front of All Saints' Church

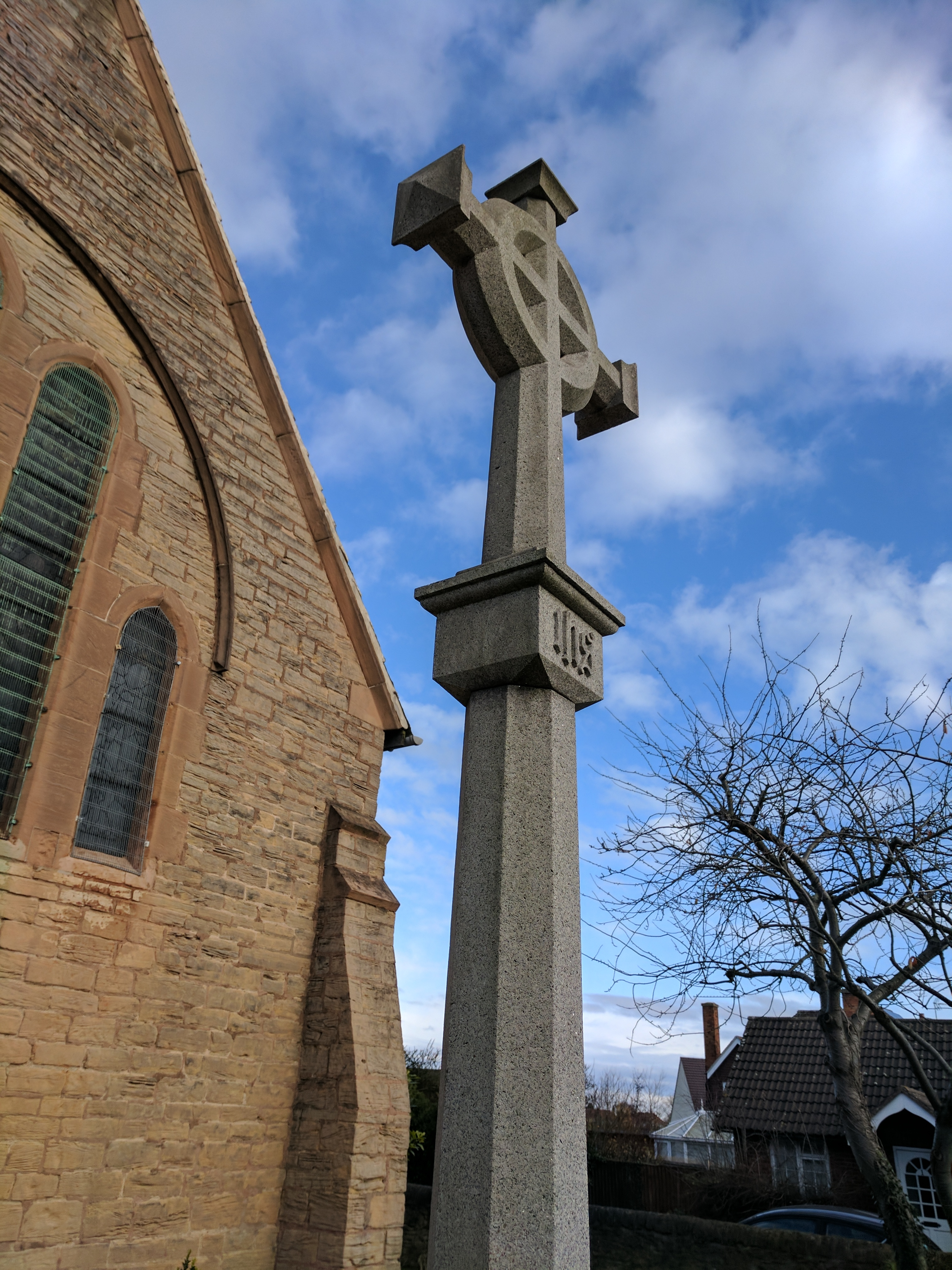
Stanton Hill War Memorial, in front of All Saints' Church
