= Fred Garratt =

English footballer

Personal information
- Full name: Frederick Howard Garratt
- Date of birth: 20 October 1888
- Place of birth: Stanton Hill, England
- Date of death: 1967 (aged 78–79)
- Height: 5 ft 9 in (1.75 m)
- Position: Centre half

Senior career*
| Years | Team | Apps | (Gls) |
| 1908–1909 | Stanton Hill Victoria | | |
| 1909–1912 | Notts County | 8 | (0) |
| 1912–1921 | Stockport County | 137 | (8) |
| Total | | 145 | (8) |
- * Club domestic league appearances and goals

Frederick Howard Garratt (20 October 1888 – 1967) was an English footballer who played in the Football League for Notts County and Stockport County.
