= Garrat =

Garrat may refer to:

- William Garrat (1805–?), English cricketer
- Garrat Noel (1706–1776), bookseller in New York City

== See also ==
- Garrat Elections, mock elections in Surrey, England in the 18th century
- Garratt locomotive, a type of steam locomotive
- Garratt (surname), with a list of people of this name
- Garret, a given name (with a list of people of this name)
