= Garrett Lynch =

Irish artist

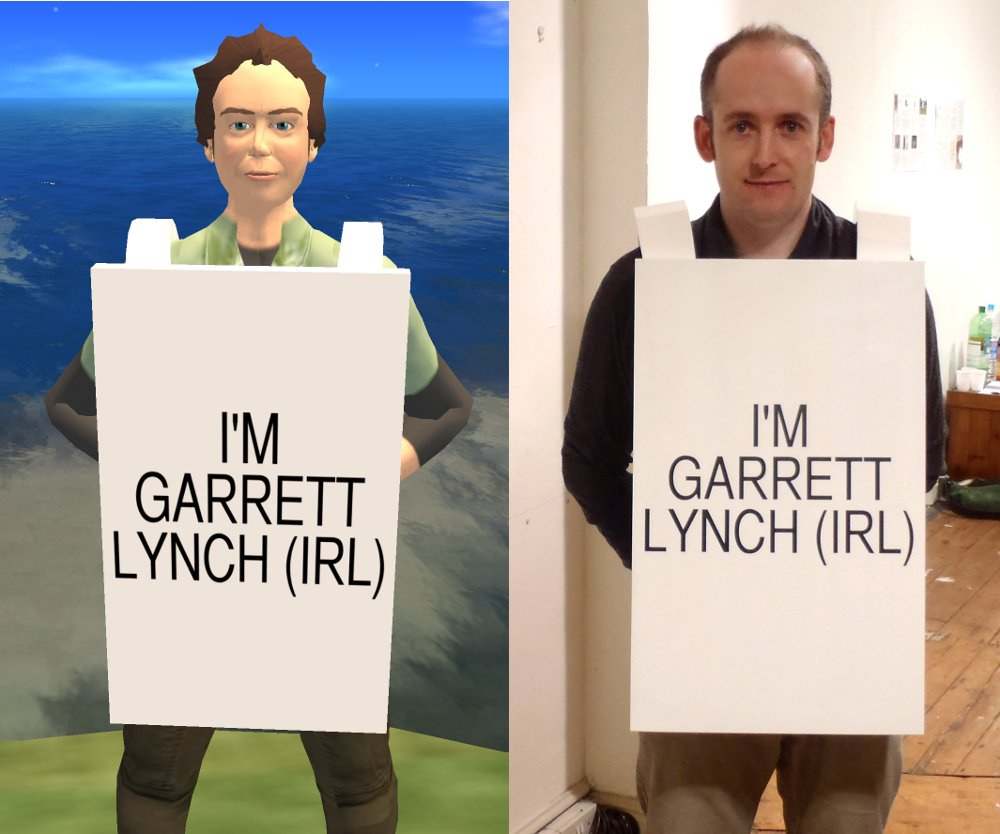
- Garrett Lynch and his Second Life "representation"
- Born: 1977 (age 48–49); Cork, Ireland
- Known for: new media
- Website: http://www.asquare.org/

Garrett Lynch (born 1977) is an Irish new media artist working with networked technologies in a variety of forms including online art, installation, performance and writing.

== Career ==
Since 2000 Lynch has a developed an artistic practice centred on the use of networks. He has published papers including "Google and Art: A commercial/cultural new media art economy?" in the ISEA, Inter-Society for the Electronic Arts newsletter and "Net Art : au-delà du navigateur… un monde d’objets" (Net.art: beyond the browser to a world of things) in Terminal no. 101, "Net Art, Technologie ou Création?" (Net Art, Technology or Creation), spoken at conferences and events, curated exhibitions and live events, exhibited and performed in a number of international exhibitions and events including "Notes on a New Nature" at 319 Scholes, "The Vending Machine" at the 54th Venice Biennale, "REFF – Remix the World, Reinvent Reality" at Furtherfield Gallery, Jouable; Art, Jeu et Interactivité, and "Liminality: The Space Between Worlds" at Antena.

== Work ==
Lynch's work has developed based on a conceptual consideration of the use of networks within artistic practice. Moving initially from a net.art practice and its emphasis on the web and the web browser as artistic form to a networked practice that explores networks in their widest interpretation, his work uses networks as "a means, site and context for artistic initiation, creation and discourse".

Informed by Cybernetics and Communication theory, his discourse frequently deals with issues concerning nodes and their arrangement, the spaces between or the internodal and the behaviour that can occur between nodes in a network. As such he views his work dealing with these concepts and issues as largely opportunist, potentially parasitic in nature and his practice as essentially one of arrangements aligning it with key concerns within conceptual art.

He states that his networked practice aims "to get people to think about the ideas I'm making connections or links between. I personally like work that makes me think so I try to make work to make others think…What obsesses me is not the internet per se but the idea of networks, all sorts of networks, technological (digital, electronic and electrical), social, biological etc. My work is starting to be a networked art rather than net.art, an internet art".

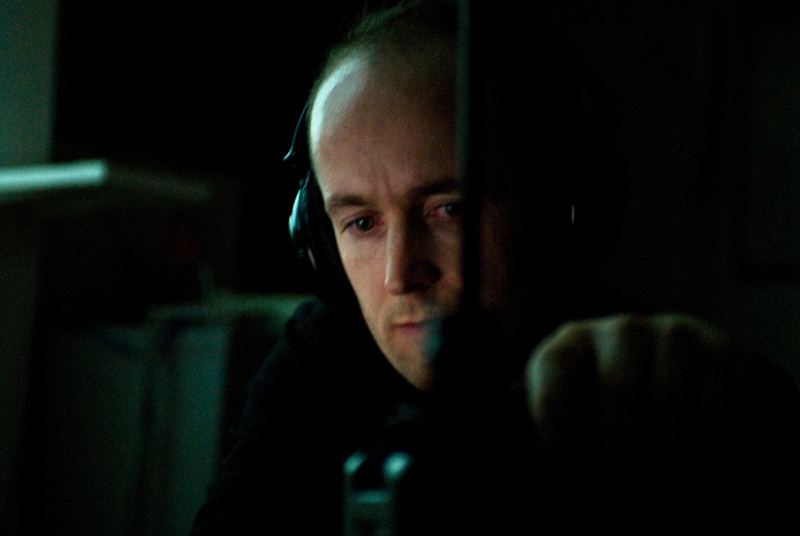
Garrett Lynch performing Trav-erse at REFF Furtherfield on 25 February 2011.

Since 2001 curating has been a part of Garrett's practice. Initially curating online net.art works through the "Banner Art Collective", in 2006 he co-founded the sonic arts events "Open Ear" which ran ten live events at various locations in England and Wales until 2009.

Lynch created the site-specific work for the online virtual world of Second Life "Between Saying and Doing" in 2008 as a critical comment on performance and virtual worlds. This initiated a series of installation and performance works dealing with ideas of identity and place as they relate to networked spaces that remains ongoing. In these works Lynch explores the "real" and the "virtual" through the transposing of his own identity to virtual worlds without any attempt to masquerade or imagine a new identity. This process involves the use of his real name for his "representation" or avatar, word play that references his names origins as both real and Irish and the use of a sandwich board prop stating this that is worn continuously.
