= Garriott =

Garriott is a surname of French origin derived from a diminutive of the past participle of the verb garer ‘to shelter or protect’. Notable people with the surname include:

- Cecil Garriott (1916–1990), American baseball player
- Laetitia Garriott de Cayeux (born 1978), American entrepreneur
- Owen K. Garriott (1930–2019), American NASA astronaut
- Richard Garriott (born 1961), British-American video game developer and entrepreneur
- Robert Garriott (born 1956), American video game developer and entrepreneur
- Sarah Trone Garriott (born 1978), American politician in Iowa
