= Garot =

Korean traditional clothing

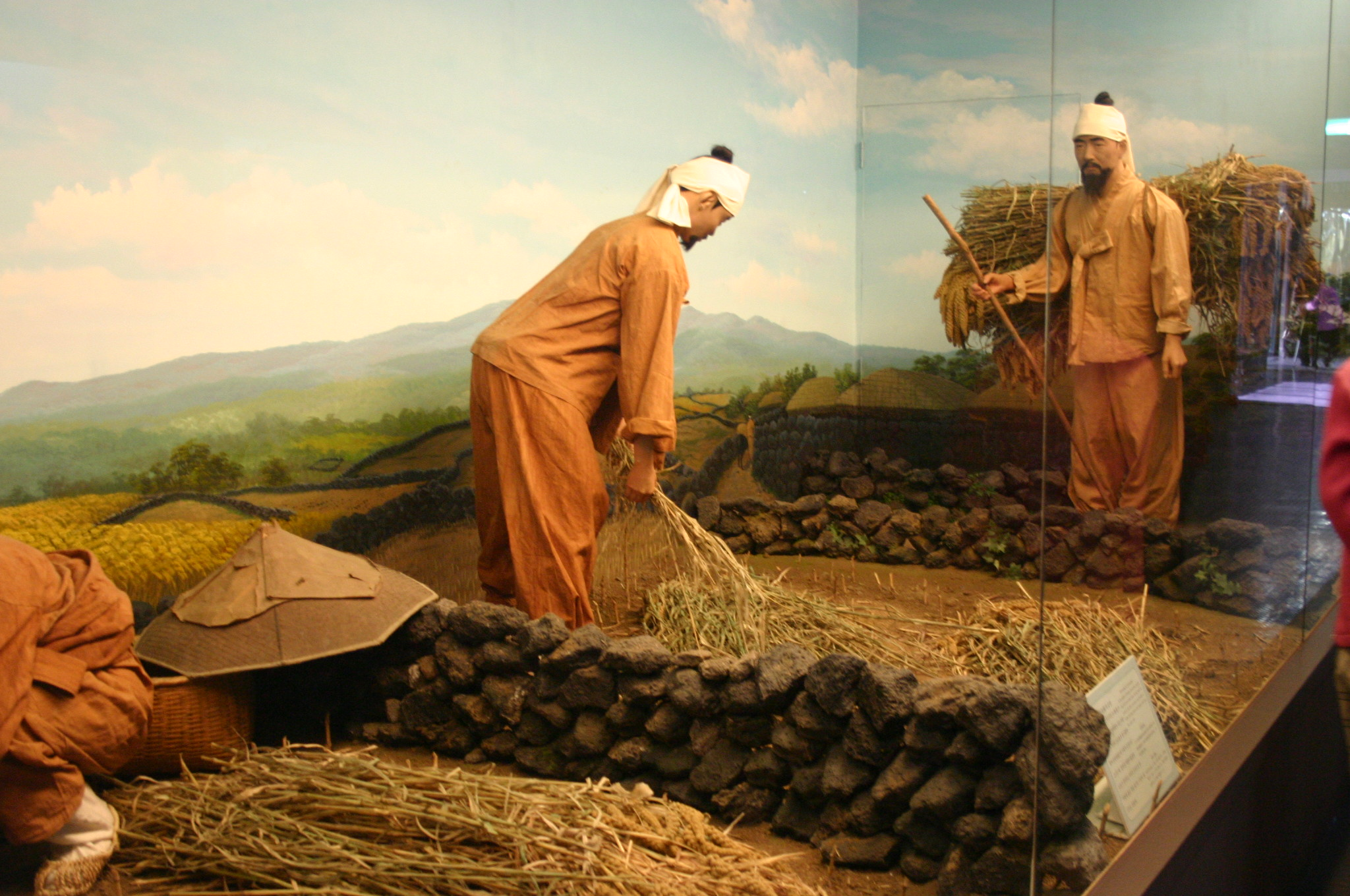

Korean name
- Hangul: 갈옷; 갈중이
- Revised Romanization: garot; galjungi
- McCune–Reischauer: karot; kalchungi

Garot (Korean: 갈옷) or galjungi (갈중이) is a variety of hanbok, Korean traditional clothing, which has been worn by locals of Jeju Island in Korea as a working clothes and everyday dress. Although there is no historical record on its origin, it is known that Jeju farmers and fishermen have worn it for a long time. According to a research on Jeju traditional tools, about 700 years ago Jeju people used fishing lines which were dyed by unripe persimmons., because it was much stronger than undyed one. They might have come up with the idea that persimmon dying could make cotton stronger, so they might have started to dye it. Gal (갈) comes from gam (감) which means persimmon in Korean, and ot (옷) means clothes in Korean. Therefore, garot refers to clothes dyed by persimmons, especially unripe persimmons.

== Making garot ==
According to Natural coloring that we have to know, various tones of black or brown colors can be obtained from dye made by unripe persimmon. To make high-quality garot, much time and effort is required. First, hard unripe persimmons should be cleaned and smashed using a wooden mortar. Next, fabric should be soaked evenly in unripe persimmon pulp, and it is then massaged in the juice of unripe persimmons. Then, after removing down small fragments of persimmon, the fabric should be laid on the grass and dried under the sun without wrinkles, otherwise the color will be uneven. It is turned over to allow the opposite side to dry. After that, it should be soaked in water and be dried again under the sun. It needs to be dried and soaked in water twice a day for 7 to 10 days. The longer it stays in the sun, the deeper the color it has. This procedure will give a dark brown color. If the color should be lighter than brown, it is better to add some water in persimmon juice and soak the fabric in it at first time. If the color should be dark and thick brown, it can be soaked in a light solution of persimmon at second time instead of water. Or it can get black color if it is soaked in iron oxide solution for a second time. So the color of garot depends on the catalyzer—limewater, iron oxide solution, vinegar—, water, and the amount of sunshine.

== Advantages of garot ==
Garot has come into the spotlight as healthful and convenient clothing. It has moth proof, waterproof, antimicrobial properties. Also Gal-ot prevents putrefaction, so it doesn't rot if stored in damp conditions. The thick, dense wave can help protect against sharp environmental hazards, such as splinters or thorns. Furthermore, it has been regarded as the best work clothing by residents of Jeju. In addition, even though Jeju's weather in summer is very humid, hot, and rainy, garot doesn't cling to the body when wet. Therefore, approximately 85% of the islanders wear garot in summer work conditions. Due to antimicrobial properties, detergent is not needed when washing. In addition, it doesn't wrinkle easily, so it is regarded as "wash and wear" clothing.

== Gallery ==
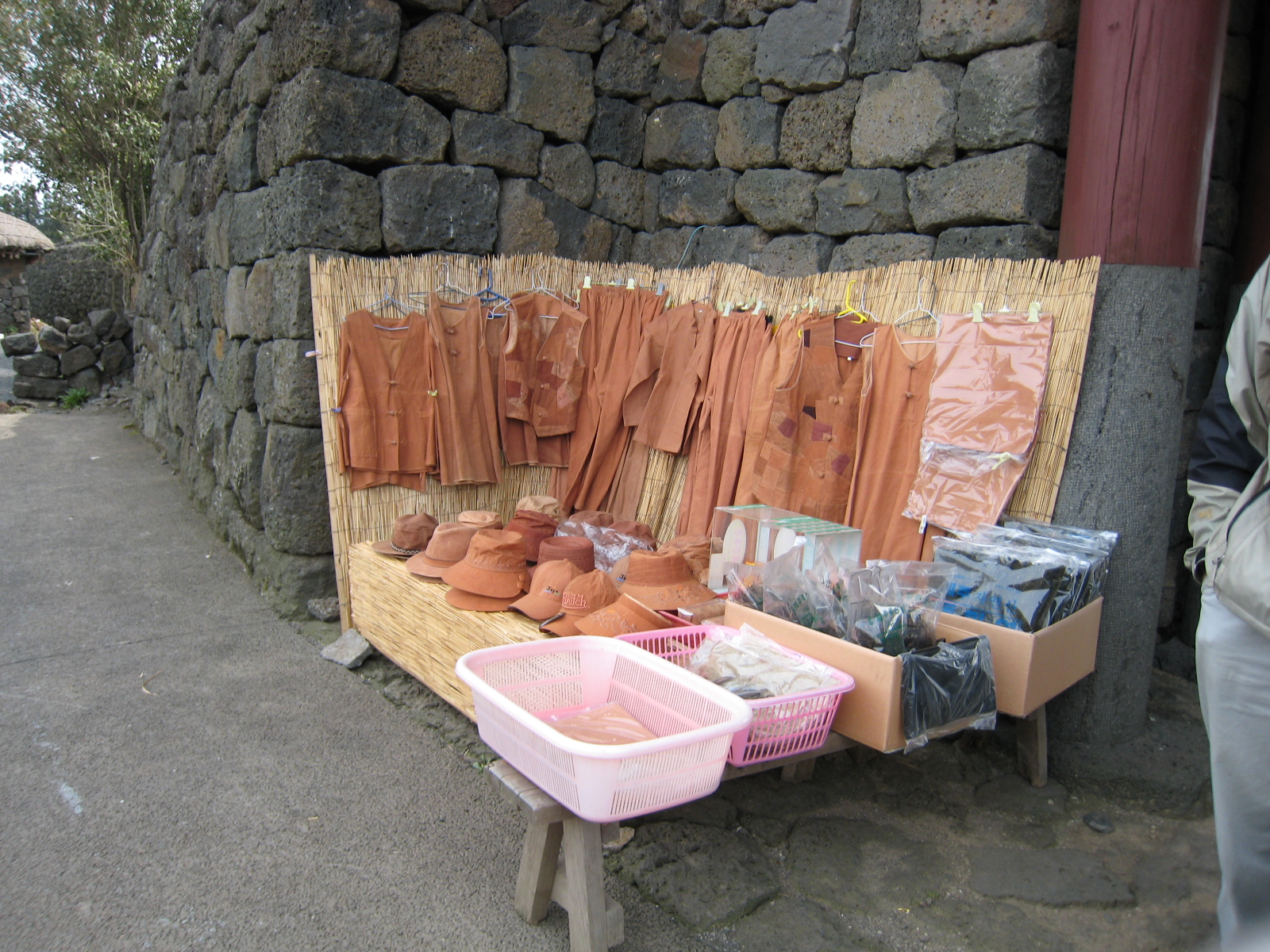

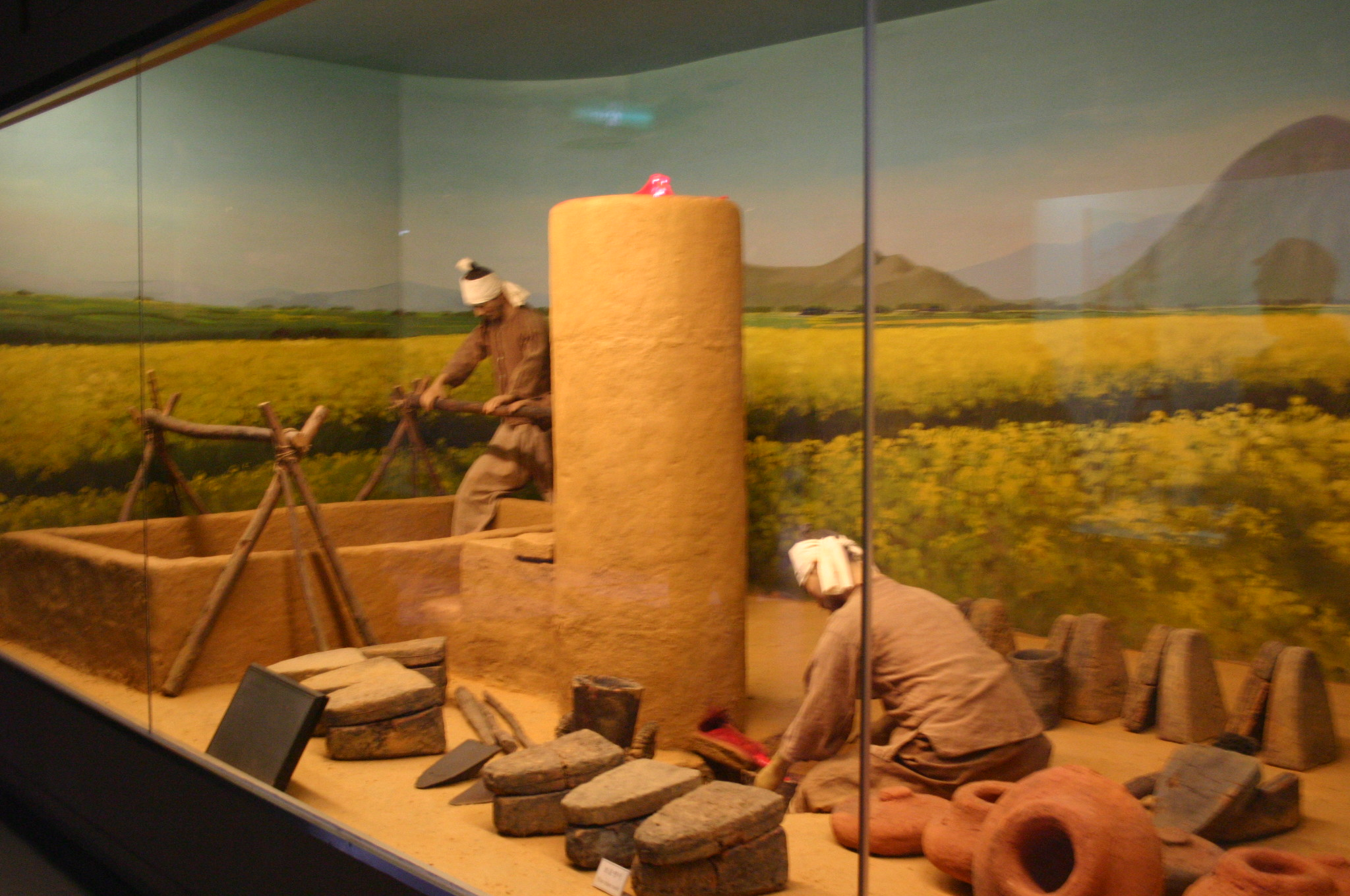

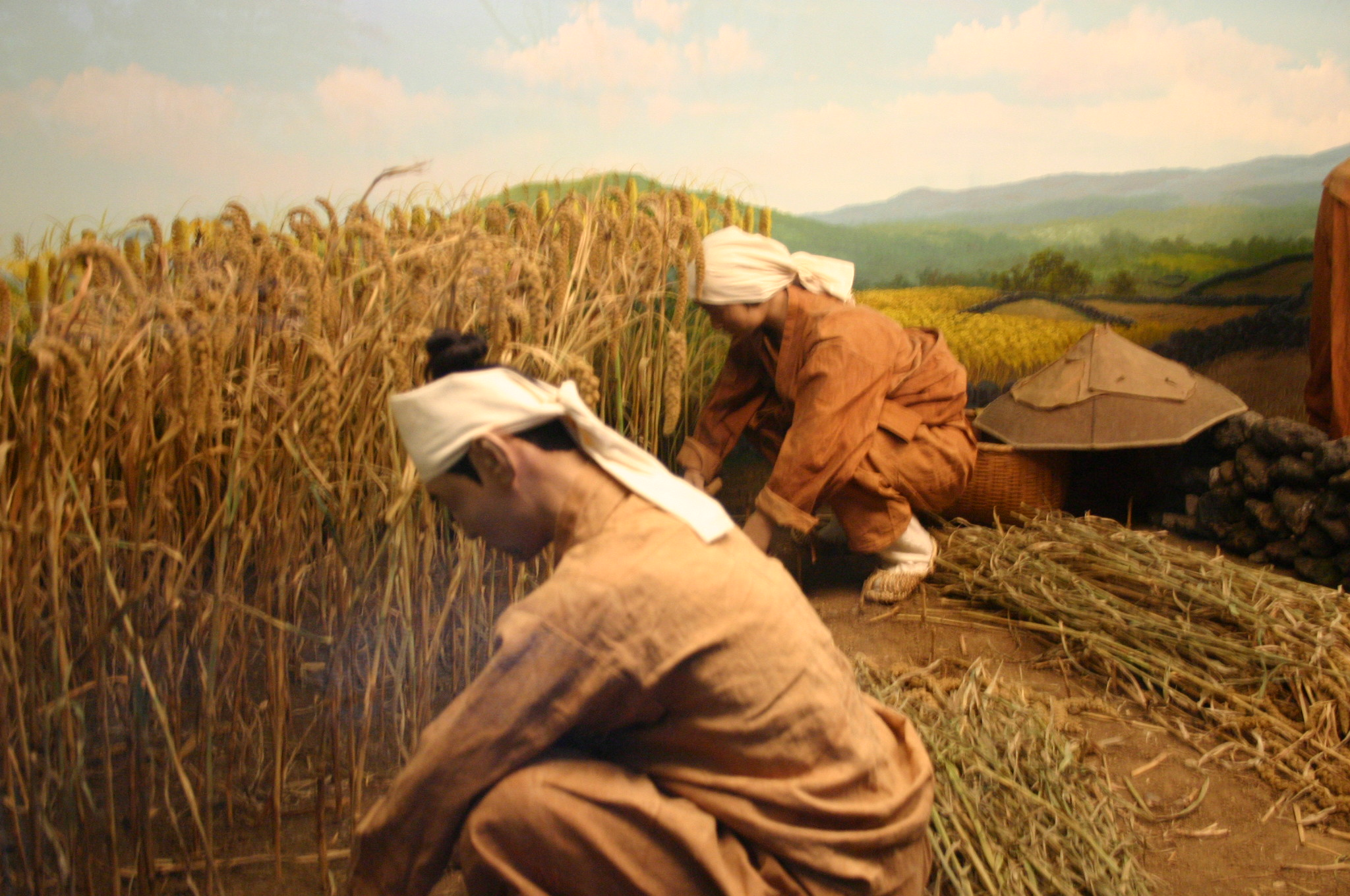

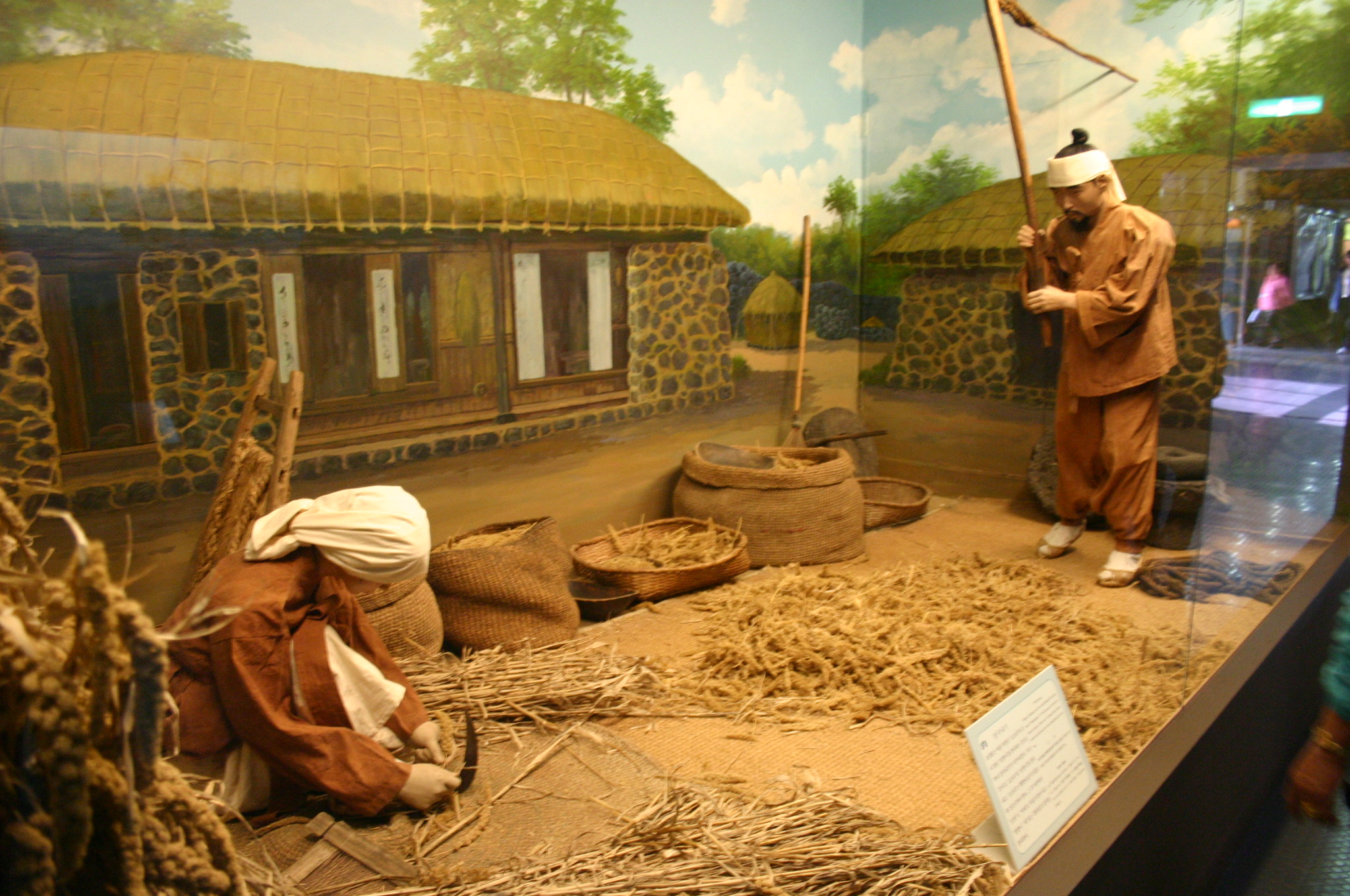

== See also ==
- Dyeing
- Hanbok
- Jeju-do
- Culture of Korea
