= Humphry Garratt =

English cricketer (1898–1974)

Humphry Garatt
Career statistics
| Competition | First-class |
|---|---|
| Matches | 5 |
| Runs scored | 111 |
| Batting average | 12.33 |
| 100s/50s | 0/0 |
| Top score | 39 |
| Catches/stumpings | 3/0 |
- Source: Cricinfo, 8 November 2022

Humphry Stone Garratt (12 January 1898 – 1 September 1974) was an English first-class cricketer who played in five matches for Worcestershire in the 1920s.

His debut came in 1925 against Oxford University at The Parks; in a drawn game he scored 11 and 5. His next match was not until two years later, when he appeared against the New Zealanders on their first tour of England, where his 31 from number ten in the order could not prevent a heavy Worcestershire defeat.

Garratt's three other first-class appearances all came in the 1928 County Championship. In the first, a drawn game against Yorkshire, he made a career-best 39, but he did little in the other two matches, against Sussex (which Worcestershire lost by 243 runs) and Leicestershire (which Worcestershire lost by an innings and 206 runs).

Garratt was born in Kingston upon Thames, Surrey; he died at the age of 76 in Worplesdon Hill, Woking in the same county.
