= Stanton Hill =

Village in Nottinghamshire, England

Coordinates: 53.1417°N 1.2791°W

- Village
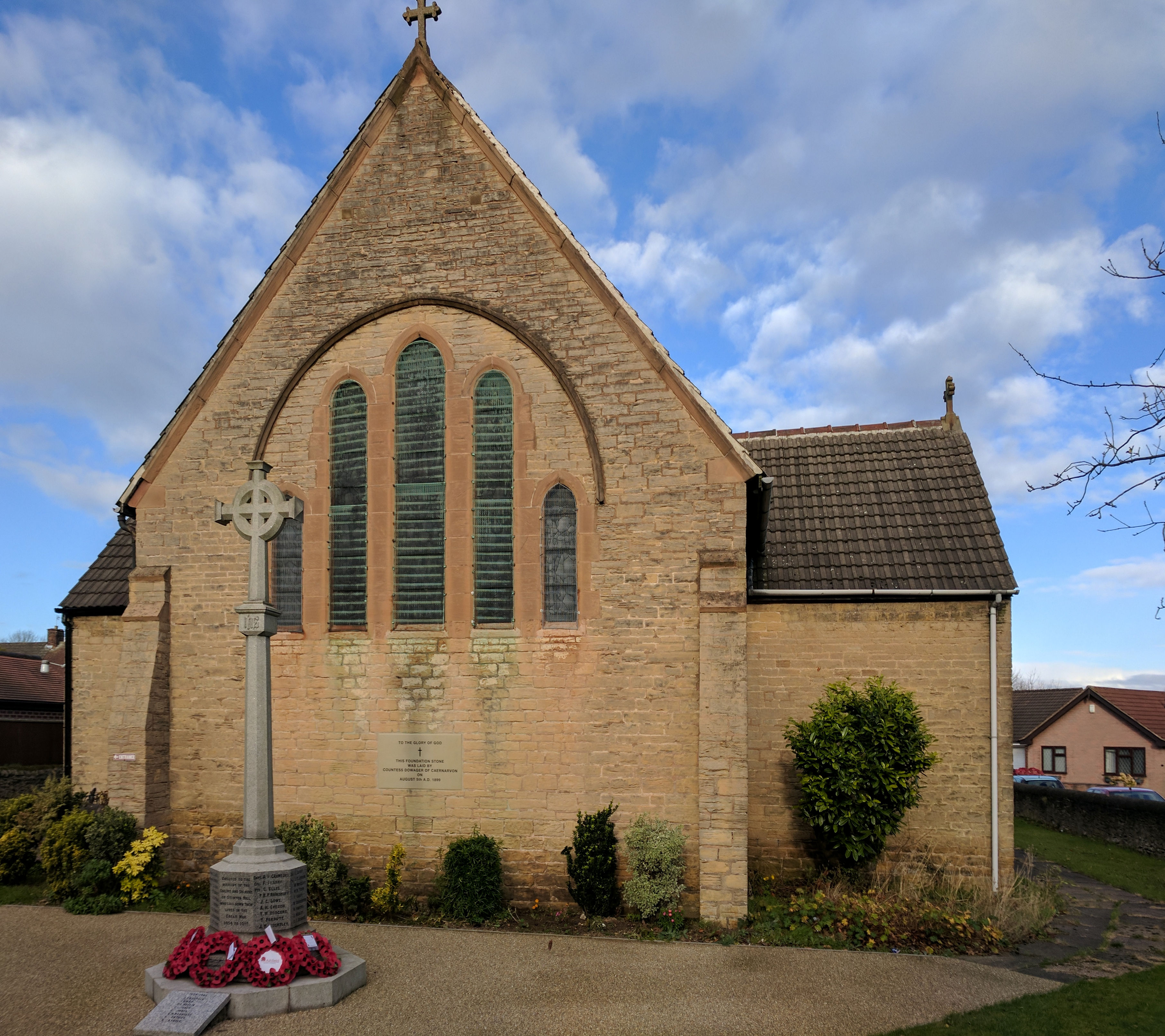
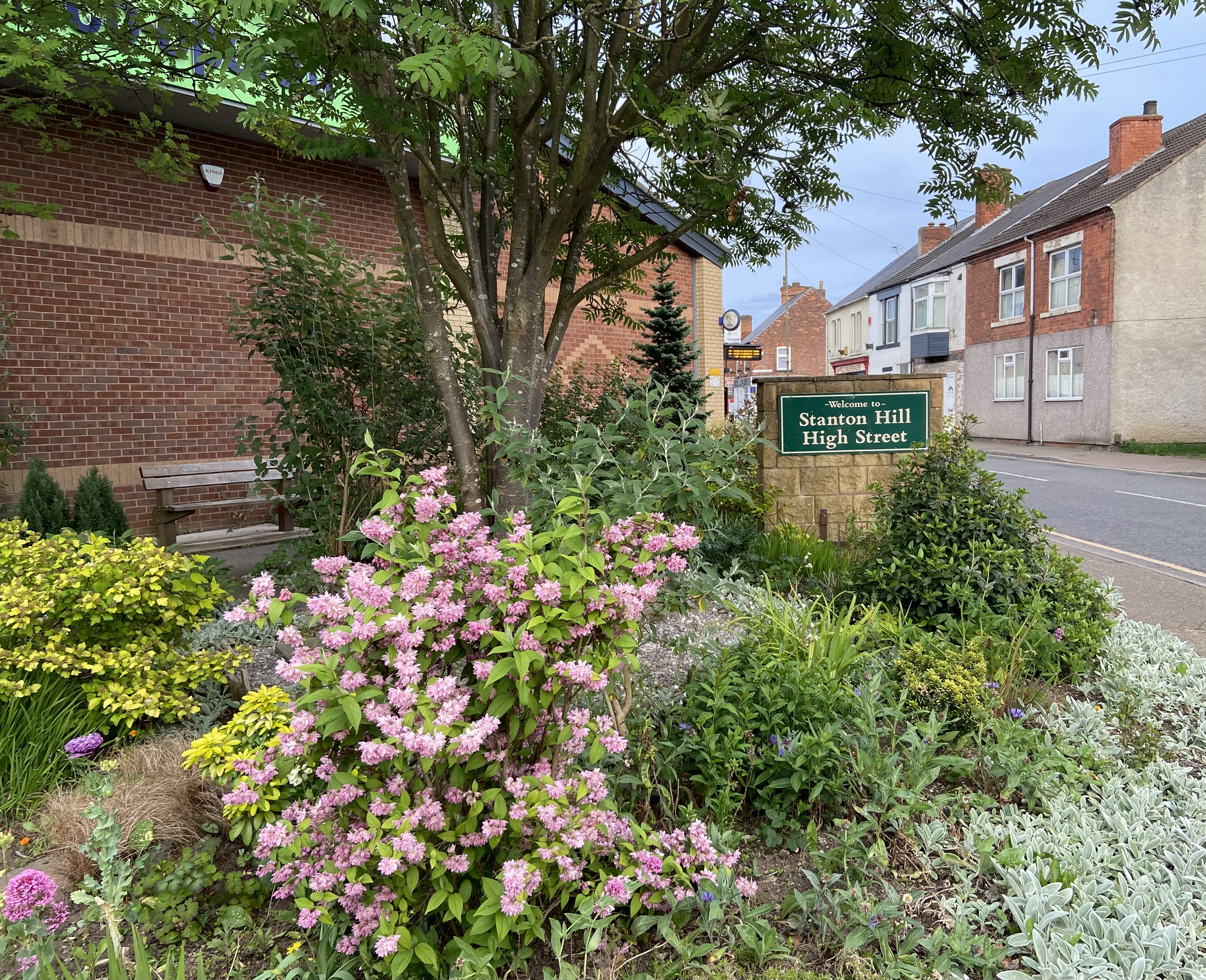
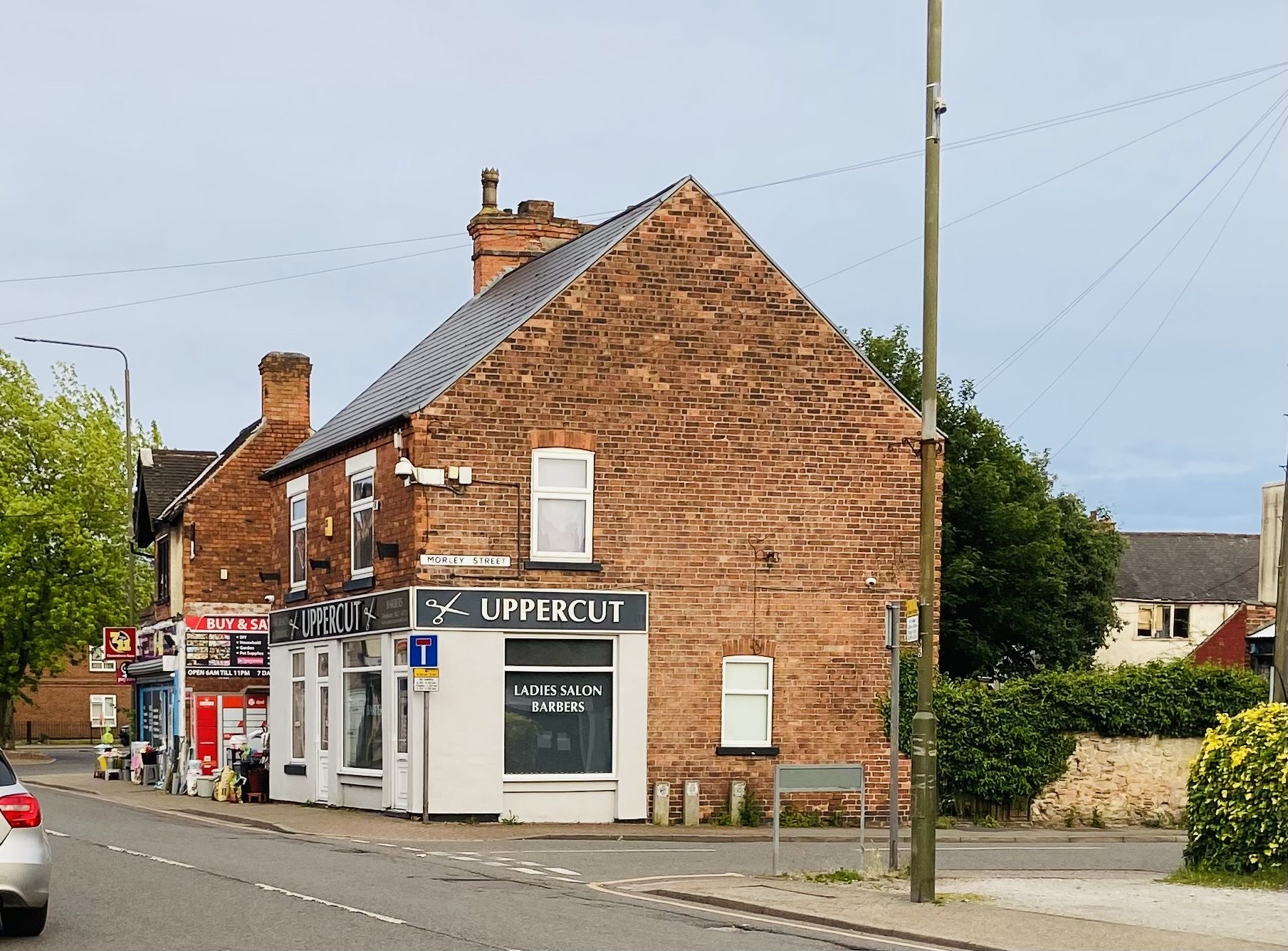
- All Saints Church The sign and garden High Street

- Location within Nottinghamshire
- Population: 2,400
- OS grid reference: SK483607
- District: Ashfield
- Shire county: Nottinghamshire
- Region: East Midlands
- Country: England
- Sovereign state: United Kingdom
- Post town: Sutton-in-Ashfield
- Postcode district: NG17
- Dialling code: 01623
- Police: Nottinghamshire
- Fire: Nottinghamshire
- Ambulance: East Midlands
- UK Parliament: Ashfield

Stanton Hill is a village in the Ashfield district of Nottinghamshire, England. Stanton Hill lies north of Sutton-in-Ashfield, close to the boundary with Derbyshire.

== History ==
Stanton Hill was built for the colliers after sinking of the collieries and a rapid growing population. The huge increase in population of Skegby – from 805 in 1869 to over 3,000 in 1884 – meant that new housing was required in the immediate area. One hundred and thirty-two houses were initially built on Cooperative Street, Institute Street and Cross Row by the Stanton Ironworks Company, beginning in 1877. However, these street names only developed later, because in 1881 they were all recorded as Stanton Hill. By 1881 Stanton Hill was described as a hamlet within the parish of Skegby.

Skegby Colliery, owned by the Dodsley family, was originally located on Wharf Road, which is now in the area known as Stanton Hill, but in the first half of the 19th century was just part of Skegby. It was situated near a triangular piece of land known as Gore Field.

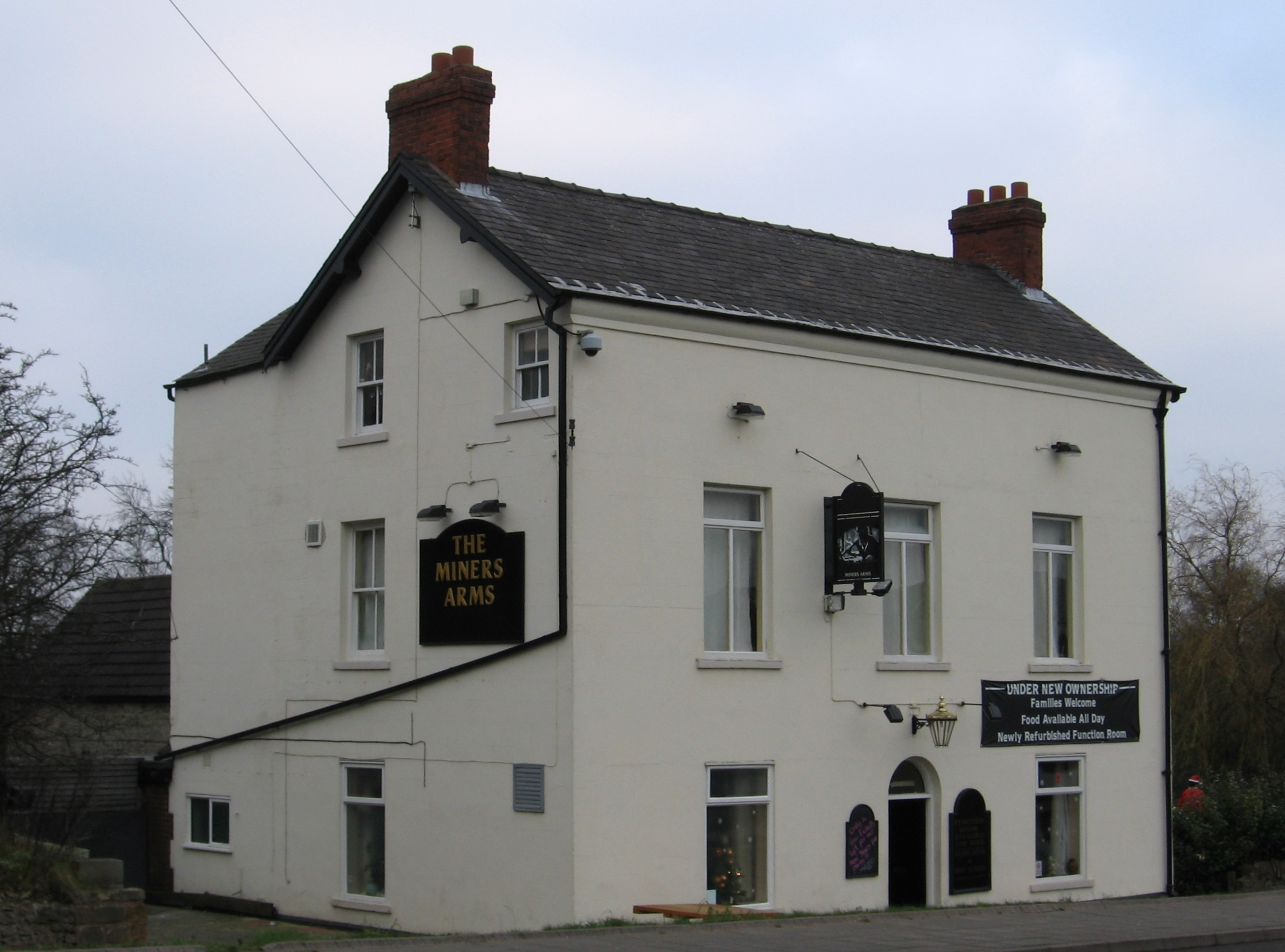
The former Miners Arms, Stanton Hill

Stanton Hill was first mentioned in the census in 1871, and then only as a street within Skegby. It probably took its name from the Stanton Ironworks Company, which started sinking the Teversal (Butcher Wood) Colliery in 1867, and later the Silverhill Colliery in 1878. Many of the workers for these new collieries moved from other coalmining areas including Shropshire, Staffordshire, Derbyshire, and Leicestershire.

Skegby Colliery was replaced by New Skegby Colliery (later renamed Sutton Colliery) in 1873. It was also known as Brierley Colliery, possibly renamed by the many Staffordshire colliers moving from the Brierley Hill area. This was later taken over by the Blackwell Colliery Company.

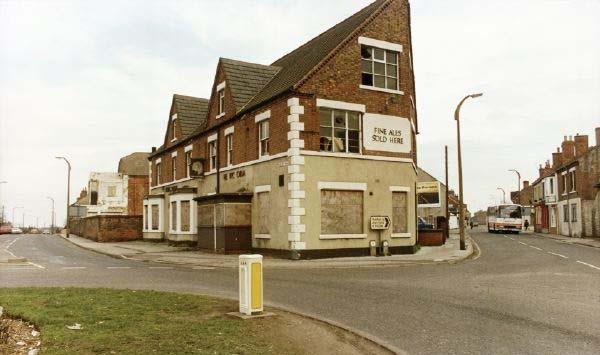
The former Victoria hotel in 1960

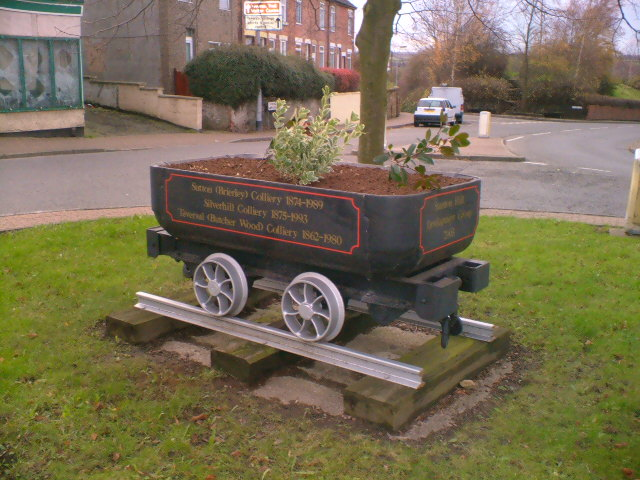
Mining Tub on the Roundabout, Stanton Hill taken in 2006

Two years after the sinking of Silverhill Colliery the Stanton Ironworks Company acquired more land at Meden Bank, on which were built a further one hundred and twenty cottages and allotments for the workforce.

The Blackwell Colliery Company also contributed to the housing in the Stanton Hill area, building the terraces of houses named Longden, Bainbridge, Marshall, Gardiner, Cochrane and Scott's. These streets were named after some of the Directors of the Blackwell Company at the time of construction.

All Saints' Church was built in 1899.

== Regeneration ==
Ashfield District Council and members of the Teversal, Stanton Hill and Skegby Neighbourhood Forum agreed in August 2024 to developing an investment plan for Stanton Hill. This will aim to improve community involvement and business owners in a sense of pride in the area, make the initial investments in the High Street to support an improved offer, and address challenges within the area.

== Notable residents ==
- An original band member of The Honeycombs who had a hit with Have I the Right in 1964 was Stanton Hill guitarist Alan Ward. Alan was living on Brand Lane when he answered an advertisement in the New Musical Express, asking musicians to audition by writing to Joe Meek.
- John Lawrence Froggatt footballer
- George Poyser footballer
- Reg Holland footballer
