= Garrett, Missouri =

Extinct town in the American state of Missouri

Coordinates: 38°48′00″N 91°38′56″W

Garrett is an extinct town in eastern Callaway County, in the U.S. state of Missouri. The community and Garrett Cemetery are on Missouri Route K, one-half mile west of the Callaway-Montgomery county line. The community of Readsville is approximately 3.5 miles to the west and Americus is about 4.5 miles to the east on Route K.

A post office called Garrett was established in 1898, and closed in 1905. The community had the name of the Garrett family, proprietors of a local mill.
