= Garet =

Garet may refer to:

- Jedd Garet (born 1955), American sculptor
- Garet Garrett (1878–1954), American journalist
- Garet Jax, a fictional character
- Garet, character in Golden Sun role-playing games
