= Garrett Ford Jr. =

American football player (born 1970)

Garrett Ford Jr. (born July 6, 1970, in Morgantown, West Virginia) was an American football running back for the West Virginia Mountaineers. His father, Garrett Ford Sr., was the first African American assistant coach in school history, is a member of the West Virginia Hall of Fame and played for the Denver Broncos for two seasons.

== Collegiate career ==
Ford came to West Virginia in 1989, and made an immediate impact. He became the first tailback at his school to rush for 100 or more yards in his debut. He shared starting time with Eugene Napoleon on a Mountaineers squad that had just come from a Fiesta Bowl loss to Notre Dame the previous year in the National Championship game. Ford rushed for 733 yards and 6 touchdowns that season, the only season he started. His totals were second on the team, behind All-American quarterback Major Harris.

Ford's next three seasons as a Mountaineer had Ford at a backup role to Michael Beasley in 1990 and Adrian Murrell in 1991 and 1992. Ford rushed for a total of 821 yards and 6 touchdowns in those three seasons as backup, including 335 yard seasons in '90 and '91.
