= Garrett Ford Sr. =

American football player, coach and administrator (1945–2025)

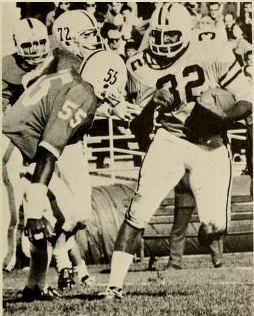

No. 32
- Position: Running back

Personal information
- Born: May 4, 1945; Washington, D.C., U.S.
- Died: December 14, 2025 (aged 80)
- Listed height: 6 ft 2 in (1.88 m)
- Listed weight: 230 lb (104 kg)

Career information
- High school: DeMatha Catholic (Hyattsville, Maryland)
- College: West Virginia (1964-1967)
- NFL draft: 1968: 3rd round, 58th overall pick

Career history
- Denver Broncos (1968)

Awards and highlights
- Second-team All-American (1966)

Career AFL statistics
- Rushing yards: 186
- Rushing average: 4.5
- Receptions: 6
- Receiving yards: 40
- Total touchdowns: 1
- Stats at Pro Football Reference

Garrett William Ford Sr. (May 4, 1945 – December 14, 2025) was an American professional football player, coach and college athletics administrator. A native of Washington, D.C., and a graduate of DeMatha Catholic High School, he played college football for the West Virginia Mountaineers, and professionally in the American Football League (AFL) with the Denver Broncos. Ford received a bachelor's degree in physical education from WVU in 1969 and earned a master's degree in guidance and counseling from WVU in 1973. Ford later returned to his alma mater and served an assistant football coach and assistant athletic director. He was the first African American assistant coach in West Virginia University history and is a member of the West Virginia Sports Hall of Fame. Ford's son, Garrett Ford Jr., was also a starting tailback for West Virginia.

== West Virginia University football ==
At West Virginia University, Ford was the first Mountaineer to top both 2,000 career rushing yards and 1,000 yards in a single season, tallying 2,166 yards from 1965 to 1967. In 1965, Ford led the team in rushing with 894 yards. His 1,068 yards as a junior in 1966 placed him first at that time and is still the fifth best on the WVU record books. Ford is one of only three running backs to lead WVU in season total offense over the course of the last 35 years. He accomplished that with 1,082 yards of total offense in 1966.

== Denver Broncos ==
In 1968, Ford was drafted by the Denver Broncos in the third round with the 58th overall pick. Ford played two years with the Broncos.

== Return to West Virginia University ==
Ford joined the Mountaineer Football staff in 1970 as an assistant football coach for Bobby Bowden. At the time, he was the first black assistant coach hired by the school. He was named academic counselor in 1977, assistant athletic director in 1985 and associate athletic director in 2002.

Ford was inducted into the West Virginia University Hall of Fame in 1995 and into the School of Physical Education Hall of Fame in 2004.

In 2011, Ford announced his retirement from WVU after more than 44 years of service to the university.

== Personal life and death ==
Ford and his wife, Thelma, had two children – Tracie and Garrett Jr., also a past Mountaineer football player. Additionally, Ford and his wife had five grandchildren.

Garrett Ford Sr. died on December 14, 2025, at the age of 80. He was buried in Rock Creek Cemetery.
