= Legion (demons) =

Demon or group of demons

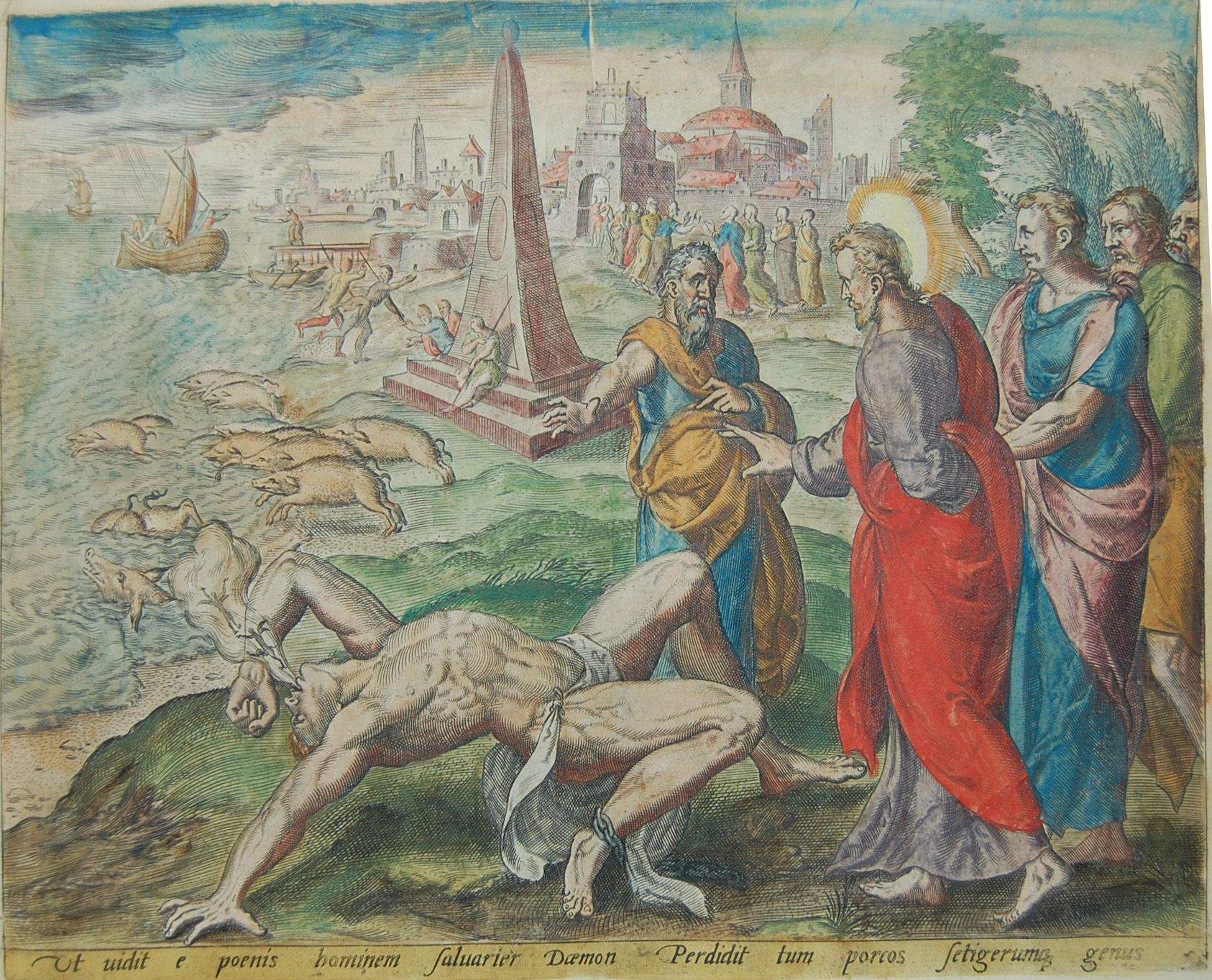
Christ healing the man possessed with devils by Johannes Wierix, 1585

In the New Testament, Legion (Ancient Greek: λεγιών) is a group of demons, particularly those in two of three versions of the exorcism of the Gerasene demoniac, an account in the synoptic Gospels of an incident in which Jesus of Nazareth performs an exorcism. Legion is a large collection of demons that form a group mind, sharing a single mind and will.

== Development of the story ==
The earliest version of this story exists in the Gospel of Mark, described as taking place in "the country of the Gerasenes". Jesus encounters a possessed man and calls on the demon to emerge, demanding to know its name – an important element of traditional exorcism practice. He finds the man is possessed by a multitude of demons who give the collective name of "Legion". Fearing that Jesus will drive them out of the world and into the abyss, they beg him instead to cast them into a herd of pigs on a nearby hill, which he does. The pigs then rush into the sea and are drowned (Mark 5:1–5:13).

This story is also in the other two Synoptic Gospels. The Gospel of Luke shortens the story but retains most of the details including the name (Luke 8:26–8:33). The Gospel of Matthew shortens it more dramatically, changes the possessed man to two men, with Michael R. Licona noting a tendency by the author to doubling figures from Mark. The location becomes “the country of the Gadarenes”. The author likely was aware that Gerasa is around 50 km (31 mi) from Galilee, though Gadara is still 10 km (6.2 mi) away; ancient biographers could display such differences in detail, with Craig S. Keener noting a comparison with the location of Straton’s governance. In this version, the demons are unnamed. (Matthew 8:28–8:32).

== Cultural background ==
According to Michael Willett Newheart, professor of New Testament Language and Literature at the Howard University School of Divinity, in a 2004 lecture, the author of the Gospel of Mark could well have expected readers to associate the name Legion with the Roman military formation, active in the area at the time (around 70 AD). The intention may be to show that Jesus is stronger than the occupying force of the Romans. The Biblical scholar Seyoon Kim, however, points out that the Latin legio was commonly used as a loanword in Hebrew and Aramaic to indicate an unspecified but large quantity. In the New Testament text, it is used as a proper name, which is "saturated with meaning". In this sense, it can mean both the size and power of the occupying Roman army as well as a multitude uncounted/ uncountable of demonic spirits. It is the latter sense that has become the common understanding of the term as an adjective in modern English (whereas when used as a noun it indicates the Roman military number, between 3,000 and 6,000 infantry with cavalry; cf. "we are legion" and "we are a legion").

== See also ==
- Collective consciousness
- Group mind
- Hive mind (disambiguation)
- Roman legion
