= Sinch =

Sinch may refer to:

- Sinch (band), an American alternative rock band
  - Sinch (album), 2002
- Sinch AB, a Swedish cloud-based communications company
- Sinch Bikes, a New Zealand electric bicycle company

== See also ==
- Cinch (disambiguation)
- Hyperbolic sine, a mathematical function abbreviated as sinh (pronounce "sinch")
- Sync (disambiguation)
