= Se-yoon =

- Hangul: 세윤
- RR: Seyun
- MR: Seyun

Se-yoon is a Korean given name.

People with this name include:

- Seyoon Kim (born 1946), South Korean-born American biblical scholar
- Yoo Se-yoon (born 1980), South Korean comedian
- Moon Se-yoon (born 1982), South Korean comedian
- Crucial Star (born Park Se-yoon, 1989), South Korean rapper
- Kim Se-yun (born 1999), South Korean football forward
- Paek Se-yun, North Korean businessman and politician

== See also ==
- List of Korean given names
