= Hive mind =

A hive mind or group mind may refer to:

== Shared intelligence ==
- Collective consciousness and collective intelligence, two concepts in sociology and philosophy
  - Group mind (science fiction), a type of collective consciousness
- Groupthink, in which the desire for harmony or conformity in a group results in irrational or dysfunctional decision-making
  - Sheeple, a derogatory term referring to groups of people who ‘mindlessly’ follow those in power
- Swarm intelligence, the collective behavior of decentralized, self-organized systems, natural or artificial
  - The apparent consciousness of colonies of social insects such as ants, bees, and termites
- Universal mind, a type of universal higher consciousness in some esoteric beliefs
- Egregore, a concept in occultism which has been described as group mind

== Media ==
- Hive Mind (book), a 2015 nonfiction book by Garett Jones
- Hive Mind (Sinch album), 2012
- Hive Mind (The Internet album), 2018
- "Hivemind", a 2012 song by To Speak of Wolves from Find Your Worth, Come Home
- "Hive Mind", a 2013 song by They Might Be Giants from Nanobots
- "Hive Minds", a 2013 song by Norma Jean from Wrongdoers
- "Hive Mind", a 2016 song by Circle of Dust from Machines of Our Disgrace
- "Hive Mind", a 2017 song by Blanck Mass from World Eater
- "Hive Mind", a 2021 song by Tirzah from Colourgrade
- "Hive Mind", a 2022 song by Slipknot from The End, So Far
- "Hive Mind", a 2024 song by The Browning from OMNI
- "Hive Mind" (Knocked Loose song), featuring Denzel Curry, 2026
- HiveMind, a video game that was planned but never released by Will Wright
- Hive Minds, a BBC4 quiz-show started in 2015 and hosted by Fiona Bruce

== See also ==
- Crowdsourcing, services, ideas or content coming from a group of people rather than from employees or suppliers
- Coalescence (disambiguation), formation of one unit from different pieces or elements
- Intentionality, philosophical term about consciousness being "about" or "directed towards" something
- Mind Hive, a 2020 album by art punk band Wire
- The Group Mind, a book by William McDougall
