= Intertextual production of the Gospel of Mark =

Viewpoint about a book of the New Testament

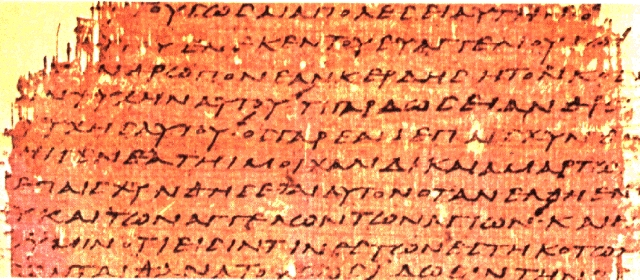
Papyrus 45 (c. AD 250), showing Mark 8:35–9:1.

The intertextual production of the Gospel of Mark is the viewpoint that there are identifiable textual relationships such that any allusion or quotation from another text forms an integral part of the Markan text, even when it seems to be out of context.

== Overview ==
It is commonly maintained that the Gospel of Mark was originally written in Koine Greek, and that the final text represents a rather lengthy history of growth. For more than a century attempts have been made to explain the origin of the gospel material and to interpret the space between the related events and the final inscripturation of the contents of the Gospel.

C. H. Dodd asserted the earliest Christians shared oral accounts about Jesus but in order to make sense of what looked like failure on the part of Jesus’ arrest, trial and crucifixion they were driven to interpret those memories in the light of Scripture. Dodd justified this model of how the stories evolved before becoming part of a written Gospel by pointing to passages in the Acts of the Apostles.

The Dodd camp's viewpoint has resulted in scholarship where the emphasis has been on the growth and not on the making of the Gospel to the extent that certain data beliefs and assumptions concerning the Gospel have become so dominant that very little progress has been made in the history of interpretation of the Gospel (see e.g. Peabody 1987:3ff). However some scholars, following the work of Alfred Suhl, have taken the intertextual production of the written Gospel seriously. The intertextuality of the Gospel of Mark has been recognized by scholars such as Thomas L. Brodie, Willem S. Vorster, Dennis R. MacDonald, and Bartosz Adamczewski.

== Traditional view ==
It is normally argued that the followers of Jesus transmitted his words and deeds by telling and retelling things he did and said, in view of the folkloric nature of many of the stories of and about Jesus, the aphoristic character of many of his sayings, the many parables he apparently told his followers, and the role of oral communication in that period.

Therefore, it is probable that Mark was informed about the story of Jesus by way of tradition. It is also probable that his audience would have known these traditions and others, such as the institution of the Lord's Supper, and controversy stories. Thus it is argued that Mark based his written story of Jesus on traditional material which he received and decided to put into written form.

This is also the way in which the origin of the material was explained in the early church. The earliest witness to the authorship of Mark is the quotation from Papias of Hierapolis (c 140 CE) in the history of Eusebius (Hist Eccl III 39:15), according to which the Gospel was based on "memory" of the things Peter had told Mark (see Breytenbach 1992).

Karl Ludwig Schmidt asserted that the accounts of the New Testament were to be regarded as fixed written versions of oral Gospel tradition. Using form criticism, Schmidt showed that an editor had assembled the narrative out of individual scenes that did not originally have a chronological order.

== Precursor texts and intertextual relationships ==
In Mark we have a text, written in Greek with different allusions to and quotations from precursor texts. These include parables, miracle stories, controversy stories, bibliographies, stories of cult heroes, speeches about the future, stories of suffering and resurrection stories. In addition Mark apparently knew themes, words, phrases and stories from the Old Testament. He must have had acquaintance with the Elisha cycle and with other performers of miracles. He must also have known the economic, political and other cultural codes of his time. We still do not know exactly how Mark went about creating his story of Jesus — that is, how he made his Gospel, but some scholars such as Willem S. Vorster argue for an intertextual production of the Gospel. Vorster writes:

The relationship between the final text of the Gospel of Mark and precursor and other texts is an intertextual relationship. There is no causal relationship between this new text and the texts out of which Mark made his text. Mark quoted other texts, and his story alludes to other texts and absorbed other texts. This is how his story becomes meaningful and different from other stories with the same theme when the reader interprets Mark's texts in the light of other texts known to him/her.

There is no reason to doubt that the written Gospel of Mark echoes many different precursor texts and intertextual relationships. Other scholars that also argue for the making of the Gospel are:

- Burton L. Mack maintains that Mark's Gospel was "not a pious transmission of revered tradition. It was composed at a desk in a scholar's study lined with texts and open to discourse with other intellectuals. In Mark's Study were chains of miracle stories, collections of pronouncement stories." Mack assumes that Mark had different Hellenistic Jewish texts, the Scriptures and other Christian texts in his study as a possible influence in the production of the Markan text in the first century (Mack 1988:322-323).
- Pieter J. J. Botha, on the other hand, maintains that the Mediterranean world of the first century was predominately oral. Mark came from an oral community and his Gospel should be seen as oral literature. Mark told his story of Jesus orally and at some stage dictated it to somebody who wrote down his words. It still bears the signs of oral literature. Per Botha, Mark is taken seriously as the producer of a text and not simply as a conduit through which a stream of tradition flowed, or a (passive) exponent of a community out of which his text arose (Botha 1989:76-77; see also Vorster 1980).

Whereas Matthew and Luke use the Old Testament within a promise-fulfilment scheme, Vorster, following Alfred Suhl, argues that Mark's use of the Old Testament is totally different.

Allusions to and quotations from the Old Testament are usually absorbed into Mark's story in such a manner that, except for a few cases where he specifically mentions the origin of the quotation, the allusions and quotations form part of the story stuff. They are so embedded into the story that, if it were not for the references in the margins and a knowledge of the Old Testament, the reader would not have noticed that Mark uses an allusion or a quotation (see Mk 15:24). This is best seen in Mark's story of the passion of Jesus.

It has often been noticed that psalms of lamentation such as Psalms 22, 38 and 69 concerning the suffering of "the just", are knitted into the passion narrative in such a manner that one can say that the passion narrative of Mark is narrated in the language of the Old Testament. The point is, however, that the allusions and 'quotations' form such an integral part of the passion narrative that it is impossible for the naïve reader to realize that the text is enriched by its intertextual relationships concerning the suffering of the Just.

One possible inference from the use of the Old Testament in the Gospel of Mark is that the author created a new story with the aid of intertextual codes that helped him to communicate his own point of view. The Old Testament quotations and references formed part of the new story that Mark created in order to convince his readers of his point of view concerning Jesus and the implications of Jesus' life, works and words for the prevailing situation.

=== Midrashic production ===
In addition to the many studies on the texts behind and in the Gospel of Mark, some scholars that argue for the Gospel as the rewriting of Old Testament stories are:

- Wolfgang Roth sees evidence that suggests Jewish midrashic influence was present in the production of the Gospel (see Roth 1988).
- Dale and Patricia Miller argue that New Testament writers created new "midrashim" on older texts. They argue that Mark did not simply interpret the Old Testament midrashically. Mark created a new midrash, i.e. "midrashim" as new Scripture in typical Jewish fashion. This is another way of seeing the importance of creativity in Mark's Gospel (see Miller & Miller 1990).

Robert M. Price, and Daniel Boyarin have noted the Jewish mode of scriptural interpretation termed midrash, embedded in the Gospel of Mark.

John Shelby Spong also sees a midrashic production of the Gospel, but clarifies his use of the term "midrashic"—as "interpretation" or "literary borrowing"—which is divergent from the traditional usage of the term "midrash", Spong writes:

I have used the word midrash only as the modifying adjective, midrashic, both to indicate the broadness of the way I am employing this concept and also to leave the word midrash to its special Jewish understanding.

Philip S Alexander holds that in modern usage the term "midrash becomes simply a fancy word for 'Bible interpretation'" and therefore its usage should be discontinued. Nathanael Vette also addresses the problem of definition and sides with those who believe that what is often being labelled as “midrash” is more like the Greco-Roman literary practice of “mimesis”, that is, literary imitation, or simply “a creative use of Scriptural material”.

=== Comparison with Jewish apocrypha and pseudepigrapha ===
A justification for the comparison of the Gospel of Mark with Jewish apocrypha and pseudepigrapha is given by Nathanael Vette, following Devorah Dimant's work "Use and Interpretation of Mikra": that these writings have in common the imitation of the styles and forms of the Old Testament (OT) biblical literature and can be read as if they are attempting to imitate that biblical world. Scripture is not primarily addressed directly in order to be explicitly interpreted in these writings but acts as an underlay that helps shape narrative episodes. Vette also borrows from Dimant the terms to describe these two types of Scripture reference: expositional and compositional. Most scholarship has attended to the expositional use of Scriptures in the Gospel of Mark, seeking to explain how the Gospel can be interpreted through its Scriptural references; but Vette seeks to redress that balance by examining the compositional function of biblical texts in the Gospel.

=== Mark and Old Testament context ===
A possible conclusion about the use of the Old Testament in the Gospel is that Mark had no respect for the original context of the quotations and allusions to Old Testament writings in his text. This can be seen in the story of John the Baptist at the beginning of the Gospel.

The first quotation (Mk 1:2-3) does not come entirely from Isaiah the prophet, as Mark asserts. (Note: The name "Isaiah" was found in some manuscripts, including B, D, L, Δ and א, but not in majority of manuscripts, patristic writings and Textus Receptus, which reads "εν τοις προφηταις" (en tois prophetais, "in the prophets")) It is a composite reference to Exodus 23:20, Malachi 3:1 and Isaiah 40:3 which he connects to Isaiah the prophet. The quotation is taken out of context and worked into his story of John and Jesus in order to show the relationship between the two. The beginning of the Gospel does not prove the fulfillment of the Old Testament, it characterizes John as the predecessor of Jesus. Only at a later stage does the reader realize the resemblance between the apocalyptic John and the apocalyptic Jesus.

John Dominic Crossan and Howard Clark Kee argue that Mark's citation of scripture is not representative of ignorance or editorial sloppiness, but rather represents combinations and alterations of scripture texts that cohere with Mark's intent to create a new story to communicate his own point of view.

== Contra Mark as only compiling "Jesus tradition" ==
Mark did not hesitate to use the Old Testament out of context, therefore it is probable that he did the same with the "Jesus tradition" he received. This underscores the argument that he retold tradition for his own purposes. By doing this Mark created a new text from other texts, traces of which can be seen in his text.

Mark was not a conservative redactor; he not only reshaped his story of Jesus by retelling the story for the sake of a particular situation, he also told it from his own perspective. However, whether Mark transmitted tradition conservatively or creatively is of little significance, even eyewitnesses shape their messages for their own purposes. Jan Vansina (1985:5) observes:

[M]ediation of perception by memory and emotional state shapes an account. Memory typically selects certain features from the successive perceptions and interprets them according to expectation, previous knowledge or the logic of 'what must have happened', and fills the gaps in perception.

This is all the more true of the Jesus tradition which has been shaped by putative eyewitnesses as well as those who retold the tradition for their own purposes and in their own circumstances. That is already clear from the different versions of the same stories of and about Jesus in the canonical gospels. First of all we do not have any eyewitness reports; furthermore, the retelling of the Jesus tradition was done in different circumstances for different purposes. This is, for instance, confirmed by the 'same' version of the 'same' parable in different contexts in the different gospels. Retelling of the 'same' event or word of a specific person involves creativity. Bart Ehrman argues that an understanding of how memory—especially memory in oral cultures— works is crucial to understanding the production of the Gospel of Mark.

== Sources ==
This article incorporates text from a free content work. Licensed under Creative Commons Attribution 4.0 International (CC BY 4.0) (license statement/permission). Text taken from The production of the Gospel of Mark: An essay on intertextuality, Willem S. Vorster, HTS Teologiese Studies.

This article incorporates text from a free content work. Licensed under Creative Commons Attribution 4.0 International (CC BY 4.0) (license statement/permission). Text taken from How and Why the Gospel of Mark Used Scripture — a review of Writing with Scripture, part 1, Neil Godfrey.

- Adamczewski, Bartosz (2014). The Gospel of Mark: A Hypertextual Commentary. Peter Lang Edition. ISBN 9783631647158.
- Botha, P J J 1989. Die dissipels in die Markusevangelie. DD-proefskrif, Universiteit van Pretoria.
- Brandenburger, E 1984. Markus 13 und die Apokaliptik. Göttingen: Vandenhoeck.
- Breytenbach, C 1992. MNHMONEYEIN: Das 'sich-erinnern in der urchristlichen Uberlieferung: Die Bethanienepisode (Mk 14:3-9/Jn 12:1-8) als Beispiel, in Denaux, A (ed), John and the synoptics, 548–557. Leuven: Peeters.
- Crossan, J D 1988. The cross that spoke: The origins of the passion narrative. San Francisco: Harper & Row.
- Dibelius, M 1971. Die Formgeschichte des Evangeliums. 6.Aufl. Tübingen: Mohr.
- Draisma, S (ed) 1989. Intertextuality in biblical writings: Essays in honour of Bas van Iersel. Kampen: Kok.
- Güttgemanns, G 1970. Offene Fragen zur Formgeschichte des Evangeliums: Eine methodologische Skizze der Grundlagenproblematik der Form und Redaktionsgeschichte. Minchen: Kaiser.
- Hahn, F (Hrsg) 1985. Zur Formgeshichte des Evangeliums. Darmstadt: Wissenschaftliche Buchgesellschaft.
- Koester, H 1990. Ancient Chnstian Gospels: Their history and development. London: SCM.
- Kuhn, H-W 1971. Altere Sammlungen im Markusevangelium. Göttingen: Vandenhoeck.
- Mack, B L 1987. The kingdom sayings in Mark. Foundations & Facets Forum 3, 347.
- --- 1988. A myth of innocence: Mark and Christian origins. Philadelphia: Fortress.
- Marxsen, W 1959. Der Evangelist Markus: Studien zur Redaktionsgeschichte des Evangeliums. 2.Aufl. Göttingen: Vandenhoeck.
- Metzger, Bruce M. (1994). Textual Commentary on the Greek New Testament (2nd ed.). Deutsche Bibelgesellschaft. ISBN 3-438-06010-8.
- Miller, D & Miller, P 1990. The Gospel of Mark as midrash: On earlier Jewish and New Testament literature. Lewiston: Mellen.
- Moore, S D 1989. Literary criticism and the gospels: The theoretical challenge. New Haven: Yale University Press.
- Neirynck, F 1991. Recent developments tn the study of Q, in Neirynck, F (ed) Evangelica II: 1982-1991: Collected essays, 409–464. Leuven: Peters.
- Neirynck, F et al. 1992 (compls). The Gospel of Mark: Accumulative bibliography 1950-1990. Leuven: Peters.
- Peabody, D B 1987. Mark as composer. Macon: Mercer.
- Pesch, R 1976. Das Markusevangelium, Vol 2/1. Freiburg: Herder.
- Phillips, G A 1991. Sign/text/différence. The contribution of intertextual theory to biblical criticism, in Plett, H F (ed), Intertextuality. Berlin: De Gruyter.
- Roth, W 1988. Hebrew gospel: Cracking the code of Mark. Oak Park: Meyer-Stone Books.
- Sanders, E P & Davies, M D 1989. Studying the synoptic gospels. London: SCM.
- Schmidt, K L 1923. Die Stellung der Evangelien in der allgemeinen Literaturgeschichte, in H EUCHARISTERION: Studien zur Religion und Literatur des Alten und Neuen Testaments. H Gunkel Festschrift, 50–134. Göttingen: Vandenhoeck.
- Vansina, J 1985. Oral tradition as history. London: James Currey.
- Vette, Nathanael (June 2020). "Kenaz: A figure created out of the scriptures?". Journal for the Study of the Pseudepigrapha. 29 (4): 245–259. doi:10.1177/0951820720929685. S2CID 220909896.
- Vette, Nathanel (2022). Writing with scripture: scripturalized narrative in the Gospel of Mark. London; New York. ISBN 978-0-5677-0466-5.
- Vielhauer, P 1975. Geschichte der urchnistlichen Literatur. Berlin: De Gruyter.
- Vorster, W S 1980. Mark: Collector, redactor, author, narrator? JTSA 31, 46–61.
- --- 1981. The function of the use of the Old Testament in Mark. Neotestamentica 14, 62–72.
- --- 1987. Literary reflections on Mark 13:5-37: A narrated speech of Jesus. Neotestamentica 21, 203–224.
- --- 1990. Bilingualism and the Greek of the New Testament: Semitic interference in the Gospel of Mark. Neotestamentica 24, 215–228.
- --- 1991. Om te vertel dat Jesus Christus die lydende Seun van God is: Oor Markus en sy teologie, in Roberts, J H et al. (reds), Teologie in konteks, 32–61. Halfway House: Orion.
- --- 1992. The growth and making of John 21, in Van Segbroeck, F et al. (eds), The four gospels: Festschrift Frans Neirynck, 2207–2221. Leuven: Peeters.
- — (1993). "The Production of the Gospel of Mark: An essay on intertextuality". HTS Teologiese Studies / Theological Studies. 49 (3): 385–396. doi:10.4102/hts.v49i3.2499.
- Wrede, W 1969. Das Messiasgeheimnis in den Evangelien: Zugleich ein Beitrag zum Verstandnis des Markusevangeliums. 4.Aufl. Göttingen: Vandenhoeck.
- Zwick, R 1989. Montage im Markusevangelium: Studien zur narrativen Organisation der altesten Jesustiberlieferung. Stuttgart: Katholisches Bibelwerk.
