= Gospel of Mark =

Book of the New Testament

- ← Gospel of Matthew Gospel of Luke →
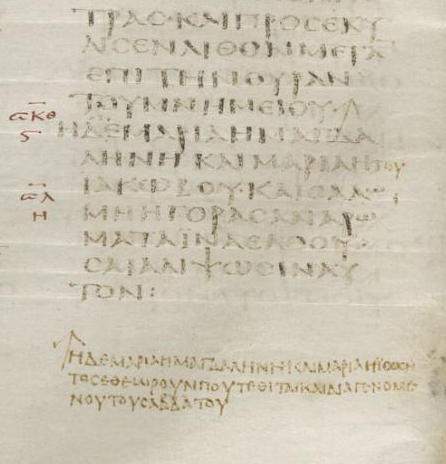
- The end of Mark 15 (excluding verse 47), along with Mark 16:1 in Codex Sinaiticus (c. 350 AD)

Information
- Religion: Christianity
- Author: Traditionally Mark the Evangelist
- Language: Koinē Greek
- Period: c. 70 AD
- Chapters: 16
- Verses: 678

Full text
- Gospel of Mark at Greek Wikisource
- Gospel of Mark at English Wikisource

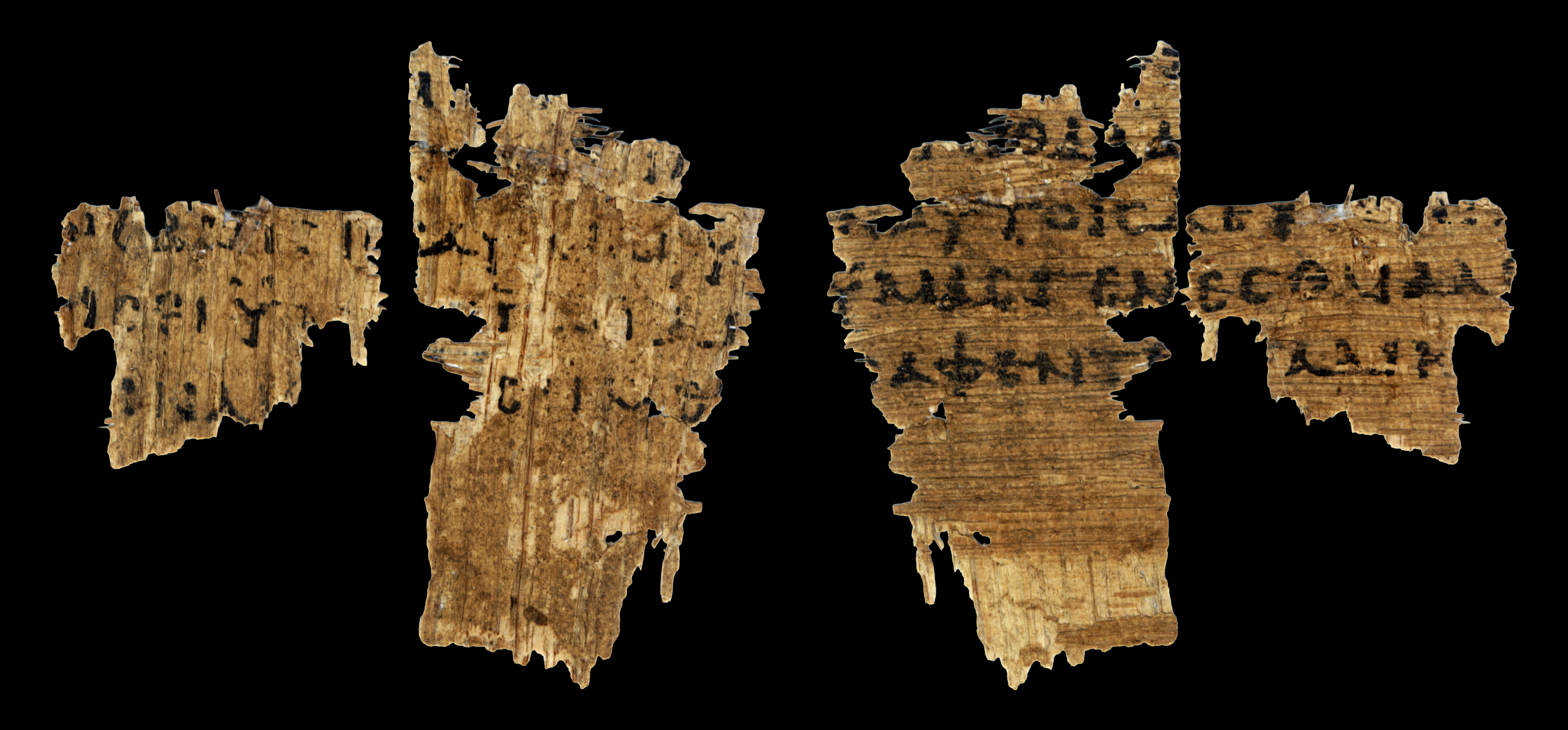
Mark 1:7–9, 16–18 on Papyrus 137 (recto and verso; c. 200 AD)

The Gospel of Mark (Note: The book is sometimes called the Gospel according to Mark (Ancient Greek: Εὐαγγέλιον κατὰ Μᾶρκον, romanized: Euangélion katà Mârkon), or simply Mark (which is also its most common form of abbreviation).) is the second of the four canonical Gospels and one of the three Synoptic Gospels. It narrates the ministry of Jesus from his baptism by John the Baptist to his crucifixion, his burial, and the discovery of his empty tomb. It portrays Jesus as a teacher, an exorcist, a healer, and a miracle worker.

Jesus refers to himself as the Son of Man and is called the Son of God, though he keeps his messianic nature secret and even his own disciples fail to understand him. This is consistent with the Christian interpretation of prophecy, which is believed to foretell the fate of the Messiah as a suffering servant.

The gospel is traditionally attributed to Mark the Evangelist, a companion of the Apostle Peter. The author is not named, and scholars debate the identity of the author. It is dated to around 70 CE and was likely written in Rome for a Gentile audience. It is classified as an ancient biography that was intended to strengthen the existing faith of its intended audience rather than to evangelize.

Most scholars believe that Mark is the earliest gospel and was used by Matthew, Luke, and John; some scholars have regarded Mark as the most reliable gospel, though this view is debated. Many scholars argue that Mark portrays Jesus as divine Lord. There is no universal agreement on the structure of Mark, but a break at Mark 8:26–31 is widely recognized. Mark 16:8, which ends with a resurrection announcement, was the original ending.

== Composition ==
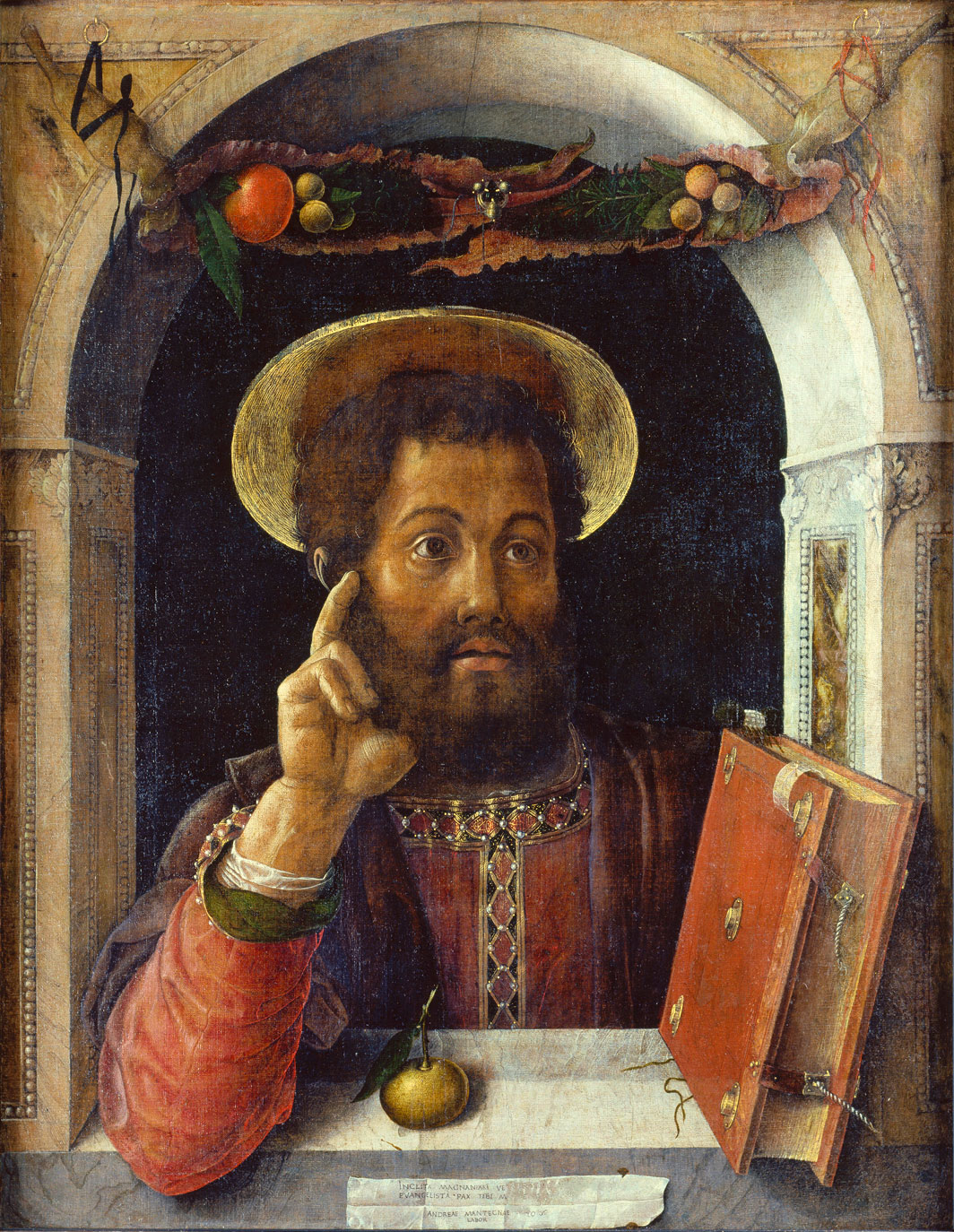
Andrea Mantegna's St. Mark, 1448

=== Authorship and date ===
An early Christian tradition recorded by Papias of Hierapolis (c. 60 – c. 130 AD), an Apostolic Father who had met 'the Elder' and the daughters of Philip the Evangelist, regards the Gospel as being based on the preaching of Saint Peter, as recorded by John Mark, a companion and interpreter of Peter. The author is not named in the text, as was common for bioi of the time; biographies by Plutarch and Suetonius also did not name themselves within the text. (Note: Authorship: Ehrman (2004, pp. 58–59): "Proto-orthodox Christians of the second century, some decades after most of the New Testament books had been written, claimed that their favorite Gospels had been penned by two of Jesus' disciples—Matthew, the tax collector, and John, the beloved disciple—and by two friends of the apostles—Mark, the secretary of Peter, and Luke, the traveling companion of Paul. Scholars today, however, find it difficult to accept this tradition for several reasons.; Watts Henderson (2018, p. 1431): "Though the author's identity is unknown, scholars find clues about its author in the Gospel itself. For example, its awkward style suggests that Greek was not the author's first language. Other details, such as the imprecise citation of Jewish scripture (1.2), the over-generalised portrait of Jewish practice (7.3–4), and problematic geographical details (5.1,13) suggest that the evangelist was a Hellenised Jew who lived outside of Palestine.) The practice also has literary counterparts with the Hebrew Bible and Near Eastern historiography. Surviving manuscripts of the Gospel carry the superscription εὐαγγέλιον κατὰ Μάρκον ("The Gospel according to Mark") or its shorter equivalent κατὰ Μάρκον, without variance, unlike more disputed works such as the Epistle to the Hebrews. Some scholars such as Hengel argue that such uniformity indicates the title was attached at an early stage of the text's transmission. There remains much debate among scholars, with some denying that the gospel was written by anyone named Mark, others accepting the view that John Mark was the author. Some, such as Theissen and Moloney, argue the gospel was written by a Mark not mentioned in the Bible or connected to Peter.

The Gospel is usually dated through the eschatological discourse in Mark 13, which scholars interpret as pointing to the First Jewish–Roman War (66–74 AD)—a war that led to the destruction of the Second Temple in 70 AD. This would place the composition of Mark either immediately after the destruction or during the years immediately prior. (Note: Leander 2013, p. 167 refers to Hengel 1985, pp. 7–28 and Collins 2007, pp. 11–14 as arguing for a dating immediately before 70 AD, and to Theissen 1992, pp. 258–262, Incigneri 2003, pp. 116–155, Head 2004 and Kloppenborg 2005 as arguing for a dating immediately after 70 AD. Leander also refers to the minority position of Crossley 2004, who proposed a much earlier c. 35–45 AD dating, listing reviews that point out the problems with Crossley's argument.) According to Rafael Rodriguez, most scholars place Mark during the buildup of the First Jewish–Roman War (65–70 AD), while a plurality date it shortly afterwards (71–75 AD). According to Helen Bond, there is a "growing consensus" that Mark was written in the early to mid-70s. The dating around 70 AD is not dependent on the naturalistic argument that Jesus could not have made an accurate prophecy; scholars like Michael Barber and Amy-Jill Levine argue the historical Jesus predicted the destruction of the Temple. According to Bas van Os, whether the Gospel was composed before or after 70 AD, that it was written within the lifetime of various eyewitnesses (including members of Jesus' own family) is likely. Markus Bockmuehl finds this structure of lifetime memory in various early Christian traditions.

Recent scholarship has turned against source criticism of the Gospels; a pre-Markan passion narrative has remained the most persistent, though Bond notes the lack of agreement in scholarship regarding its nature alerts to its lack of existence. Since the 19th century, most scholars have held to Marcan priority, in which Mark was the first gospel written and used by Matthew, Luke, and John.

=== Setting ===
The Gospel of Mark was written in Greek for a primarily non-Jewish audience. Rome, attested to by Clement of Alexandria, is the setting most often posited by scholars, though a growing number favor locations in Syria such as Antioch; a Galilean provenance for the gospel has been forwarded but not widely accepted. Theologian and former Archbishop of Canterbury Rowan Williams proposed that Libya was a possible setting, as it was the location of Cyrene and there is a long-held Arabic tradition of Mark's residence there.

The consensus among modern scholars is that the Gospels are a subset of the genre of bios (ancient biography). Ancient biographies were typically written shortly after the subject's death and included substantial historical material. They aimed to provide readers with examples to emulate, to preserve and promote the subject's reputation and memory, and to convey moral and rhetorical content. The gospels were written to strengthen the faith of those who already believed, rather than as tracts for missionary conversion. Christian churches were small communities of believers, often based on households (an autocratic patriarch with his extended family, slaves, freedmen, and other clients). Aune argues that the evangelists wrote on two levels: a "historical" presentation of Jesus and a layer addressing the concerns of the author's own day; other scholars have challenged two-level readings of the fourth gospel.

Christianity began within Judaism, with a Christian "church" (ἐκκλησία, ekklesia, meaning 'assembly') that arose shortly after Jesus's death when some of his followers claimed to have witnessed him risen from the dead. Christians depended heavily on Jewish literature, supporting their convictions through the Jewish scriptures. Those convictions involved a nucleus of key concepts: the messiah, the son of God and the son of man, the suffering servant, the Day of the Lord, and the kingdom of God. These ideas were linked by apocalyptic expectation: Jews and Christians alike believed that God would punish their enemies, establish his rule, and place them at the centre of his plan. Christians read the Jewish scripture as a figure or type of Jesus so that the goal of Christian literature became an experience of the living Christ. The movement spread around the eastern Mediterranean and to Rome and further west and assumed a distinct identity, although the groups within it remained diverse.

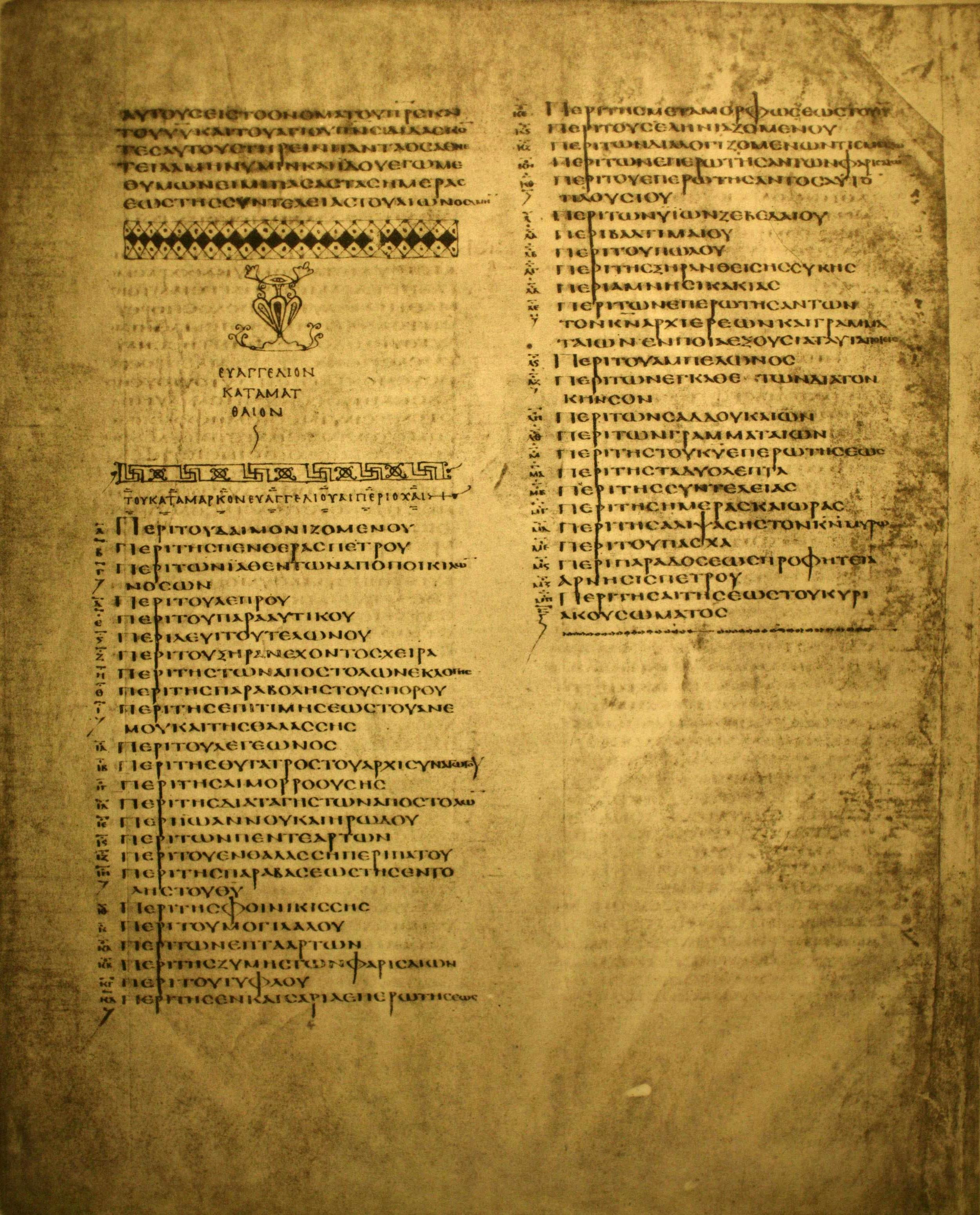
List of kephalaia (chapters) in the Gospel of Mark, placed after the colophon of the Gospel of Matthew and before the Gospel of Mark, in the Codex Alexandrinus (400–440 AD)

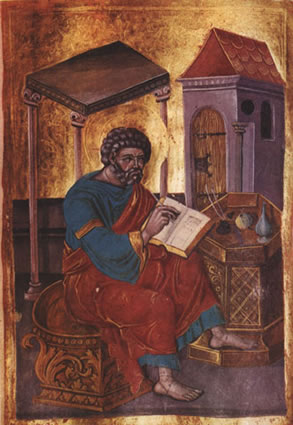
Mark the Evangelist, 16th-century Russian icon

=== Historicity ===
The idea of Marcan priority gained widespread acceptance in the 19th century. From this perspective, Mark was generally regarded as the most reliable of the four Gospels for information about the historical Jesus, owing to its early provenance. However, the view that Mark could be used to reconstruct the historical Jesus was significantly undermined in the early 20th century. Firstly, in 1901 William Wrede put forward an argument that the "Messianic Secret" motif within Mark had actually been a creation of the early church instead of a reflection of the historical Jesus. In 1919, Karl Ludwig Schmidt argued that the links between episodes in Mark were a literary invention of the author, meaning that the text could not be used as evidence in attempts to reconstruct the chronology of Jesus' mission. However, efforts to cast Mark as a literary invention have struggled to explain details such as Mark 15:21, which casts Simon's sons as children of an eyewitness who could affirm their father's testimony. The author likely knew Alexander and Rufus. By the mid-1990s, scholars broadly agreed that the gospels represented ancient biographies of Jesus rather than sui generis works or theological treatises. Nonetheless, Mark was generally seen as the most reliable of the four gospels at the end of the 20th century in its overall description of Jesus' life and ministry.

Michael Patrick Barber has challenged the prevailing view, arguing that Matthew's portrayal offers a historically plausible account of the historical Jesus. Dale Allison had already argued that the Gospel of Matthew is more accurate than Mark in several regards, but was finally convinced by Barber's work to no longer regard the "uniquely Matthean" materials as ahistorical, declaring that the historical Jesus "is not buried beneath Matthew but stares at us from its surface". Matthew Thiessen wholeheartedly agrees as well, finding no fault in Barber's work. (Note: Thiessen: "Barber concludes that the Gospel of Matthew provides a historically plausible depiction of Jesus, regardless of the historical veracity of this or that precise detail. This remembered Jesus, the only Jesus we have access to [...] was a temple-pious Jew [...]it is this Jesus who makes sense of the various shapes that the early Jesus movement took")

== Structure and content ==
Detailed content of Mark

1. Galilean ministry

John the Baptist (1:1–8)

Baptism of Jesus (1:9–11)

Temptation of Jesus (1:12–13)

Return to Galilee (1:14)

Good News (1:15)

First disciples (1:16–20)

Capernaum's synagogue (1:21–28)

Peter's mother-in-law (1:29–31)

Exorcising at sunset (1:32–34)

A leper (1:35–45)

A paralytic (2:1–2:12)

Calling of Matthew (2:13–17)

Fasting and wineskins (2:18–22)

Lord of the Sabbath (2:23–28)

Man with withered hand (3:1–6)

Withdrawing to the sea (3:7–3:12)

Commissioning the Twelve (3:13–19)

Blind mute (3:20–26)

Strong man (3:27)

Eternal sin (3:28–30)

Jesus' true relatives (3:31–35)

Parable of the Sower (4:1–9, 4:13–20)

Purpose of parables (4:10–12,33–34)

Lamp under a bushel (4:21–23)

Mote and Beam (4:24–25)

Growing seed and Mustard seed (4:26–32)

Calming the storm (4:35–41)

Demon named Legion (5:1–20)

Daughter of Jairus (5:21–43)

Hometown rejection (6:1–6)

Instructions for the Twelve (6:7–13)

Beheading of John (6:14–29)

Feeding the 5000 (6:30–44)

Walking on water (6:45–52)

Fringe of his cloak heals (6:53–56)

Discourse on Defilement (7:1–23)

Canaanite woman's daughter (7:24–30)

Deaf mute (7:31–37)

Feeding the 4000 (8:1–9)

No sign will be given (8:10–21)

Healing with spit (8:22–26)

Peter's confession (8:27–30)

Jesus predicts his death (8:31–33, 9:30–32, 10:32–34)

Instructions for followers (8:34–9:1)

Transfiguration (9:2–13)

Possessed boy (9:14–29)

Teaching in Capernaum (9:33–50)

2. Journey to Jerusalem

Entering Judea and Transjordan (10:1)

On divorce (10:2–12)

Little children (10:13–16)

Rich young man (10:17–31)

Son of man came to serve (10:35–45)

Blind Bartimaeus (10:46–52)

3. Events in Jerusalem

Entering Jerusalem (11:1–11)

Cursing the fig tree (11:12–14,20–24)

Temple incident (11:15–19)

Prayer for forgiveness (11:25–26)

Authority questioned (11:27–33)

Wicked husbandman (12:1–12)

Render unto Caesar... (12:13–17)

Resurrection of the Dead (12:18–27)

Great Commandment (12:28–34)

Is the Messiah the son of David? (12:35–40)

Widow's mite (12:41–44)

Olivet Discourse (13)

Plot to kill Jesus (14:1–2)

Anointing (14:3–9)

Bargain of Judas (14:10–11)

Last Supper (14:12–26)

Denial of Peter (14:27–31,66–72)

Agony in the Garden (14:32–42)

Kiss of Judas (14:43–45)

Arrest (14:46–52)

Before the High Priest (14:53–65)

Pilate's court (15:1–15)

Soldiers mock Jesus (15:16–20)

Simon of Cyrene (15:21)

Crucifixion (15:22–41)

Entombment (15:42–47)

Empty tomb (16:1–8)

The Longer Ending (16:9–20)

Post-resurrection appearances (16:9–13)

Great Commission (16:14–18)

Ascension (16:19)

Dispersion of the Apostles (16:20)

=== Structure ===
There is currently no agreement on the structure of Mark. There is, however, a widely recognized break at Mark 8:26–31: before 8:26 there are numerous miracle stories, the action is in Galilee, and Jesus preaches to the crowds, while after 8:31 there are hardly any miracles, the action shifts from Galilee to gentile areas or hostile Judea, and Jesus teaches the disciples. Peter's confession at Mark 8:27–30 that Jesus is the messiah thus forms the watershed to the whole gospel. A further generally recognised turning point comes at the end of chapter 10, when Jesus and his followers arrive in Jerusalem and the foreseen confrontation with the Temple authorities begins, leading R.T. France to characterise Mark as a three-act drama. A four-act drama acknowledges a further turning point at 6.1, with divisions at 1.21, 6.1, 8.27 and 11.1. This scheme identifies Four Series of Seven Days, where the Series are arranged as a classic chiasm, ABB'A' and the Days in each Series are arranged as in Homer's Iliad ABB'-X-ABB'. James Edwards in his 2002 commentary points out that the gospel can be seen as a series of questions asking first who Jesus is (the answer being that he is the messiah), then what form his mission takes (a mission of suffering culminating in the crucifixion and resurrection, events only to be understood when the questions are answered), while another scholar, C. Myers, has made what Edwards calls a "compelling case" for recognising the incidents of Jesus' baptism, transfiguration and crucifixion, at the beginning, middle and end of the gospel, as three key moments, each with common elements, and each portrayed in an apocalyptic light. Stephen H. Smith has made the point that the structure of Mark is similar to the structure of a Greek tragedy.

=== Content ===
- Jesus is first announced as the Messiah and then later as the Son of God; he is baptised by John and a heavenly voice announces him as the Son of God; he is tested in the wilderness by Satan; John is arrested, and Jesus begins to preach the good news of the kingdom of God.
- Jesus gathers his disciples; he begins teaching, driving out demons, healing the sick, cleansing lepers, raising the dead, feeding the hungry, and giving sight to the blind; he delivers a long discourse in parables to the crowd, intended for the disciples, but they fail to understand; he performs mighty works, calming the storm and walking on water, but while God and demons recognise him, neither the crowds nor the disciples grasp his identity. He also has several run-ins with Jewish law keepers, especially in chapters 2–3.
- Jesus asks the disciples who people say he is, and then, "but you, who do you say I am?" Peter answers that he is the Christ, and Jesus commands him to silence; Jesus explains that the Son of Man must go to Jerusalem and be killed, but will rise again; Moses and Elijah appear with Jesus and God tells the disciples, "This is my son," but they remain uncomprehending.
- Jesus goes to Jerusalem, where he is hailed as one who "comes in the name of the Lord" and will inaugurate the "kingdom of David"; he drives those who buy and sell animals from the Temple and debates with the Jewish authorities; on the Mount of Olives he announces the coming destruction of the Temple, the persecution of his followers, and the coming of the Son of Man in power and glory.
- A woman perfumes Jesus' head with oil, and Jesus explains that this is a sign of his coming death; Jesus celebrates Passover with the disciples, declares the bread and wine to be his body and blood, and goes with them to Gethsemane to pray; there Judas betrays him to the Jewish authorities. Interrogated by the high priest, Jesus says that he is the Christ, the Son of God, and will return as Son of Man at God's right hand. The Jewish leaders turn him over to Pilate, who has him crucified as one who claims to be "king of the Jews"; Jesus, abandoned by the disciples, is buried in a rock tomb by a sympathetic member of the Jewish council.
- The women who have followed Jesus come to the tomb on Sunday morning; they find it empty, and are told by a young man in a white robe to go and tell the others that Jesus has risen and has gone before them to Galilee; "but they said nothing to anyone, for they were afraid".

=== Ending ===
The earliest extant Greek manuscripts of Mark, codices Vaticanus (which contains a large blank space in the column after 16:8) and Sinaiticus, end at Mark 16:8, with the women fleeing in fear from the empty tomb. The majority of recent scholars believe this to be the original ending, and that this is supported by statements from the early Church Fathers Eusebius and Jerome. The "shorter ending", found in a small number of manuscripts, tells how the women told "those around Peter" all that the angel had commanded and how the message of eternal life (or "proclamation of eternal salvation") was then sent out by Jesus himself. This differs from the rest of Mark both in style and in its understanding of Jesus and is almost universally considered a spurious addition; the overwhelming majority of manuscripts have the "longer ending", with accounts of the resurrected Jesus, the commissioning of the disciples to proclaim the gospel, and Christ's ascension. In deference to its importance within the manuscript tradition, the New Testament critical editors enclose the longer ending in brackets.

== Theology ==
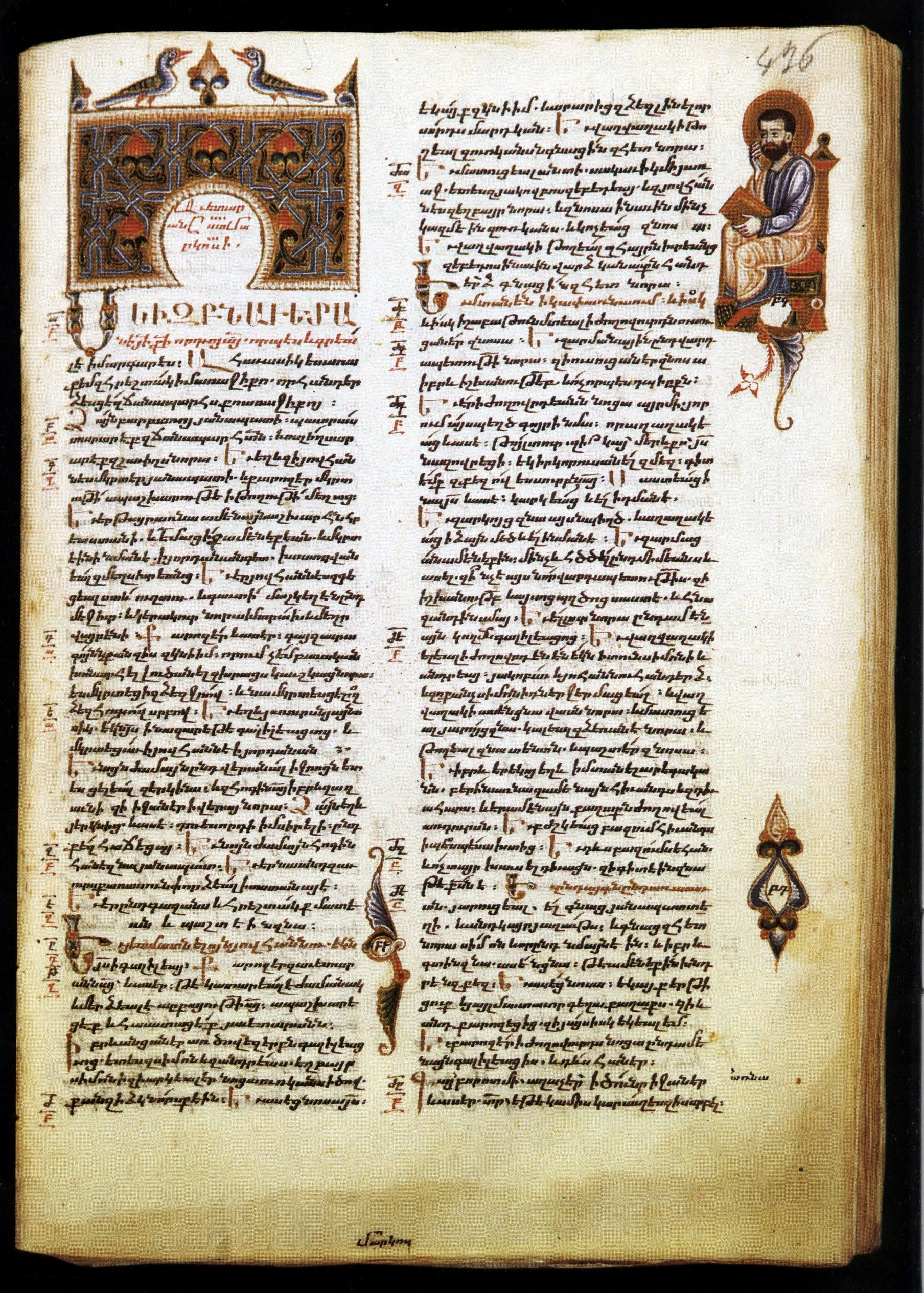
First page of the Gospel of Mark: "The beginning of the gospel of Jesus Christ, the Son of God", by Sargis Pitsak (14th century)

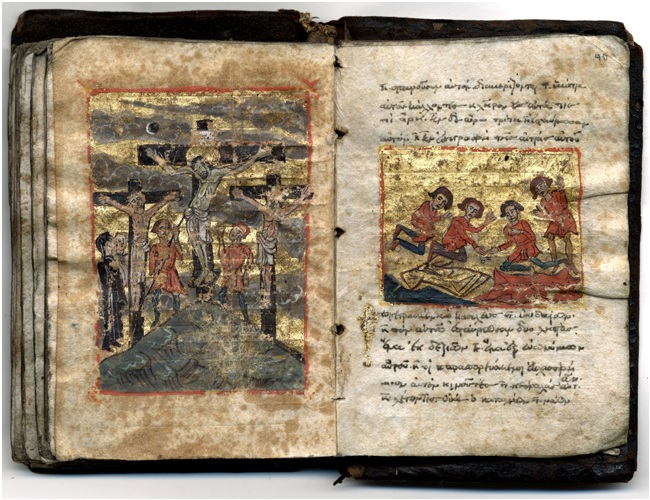
Minuscule 2427 – "Archaic Mark"

=== Gospel ===
The author introduces his work as "gospel", meaning "good news", a literal translation of the Greek "evangelion" – he uses the word more often than any other writer in the New Testament except Paul. Paul uses it to mean "the good news (of the saving significance of the death and resurrection) of Christ"; Mark extends it to the career of Christ as well as his death and resurrection. Like the other gospels, Mark was written to confirm the identity of Jesus as eschatological deliverer – the purpose of terms such as "messiah" and "son of God". As in all the gospels, the messianic identity of Jesus is supported by a number of themes, including: (1) the depiction of his disciples as obtuse, fearful and uncomprehending; (2) the refutation of the charge made by Jesus' enemies that he was a magician; (3) secrecy surrounding his true identity (this last is missing from John).

=== The failure of the disciples ===
Mark has been viewed as portraying the disciples of Jesus in a negative light, although recent studies largely argue that Mark is not as negative towards Peter as a previous generation of scholars thought. Mark, the disciples, especially the Twelve, move from lack of perception of Jesus to rejection of the "way of suffering" to flight and denial – even the women who received the first proclamation of his resurrection can be seen as failures for not reporting the good news. There is much discussion of this theme among scholars. Some argue that the author of Mark was using the disciples to correct "erroneous" views in his own community concerning the reality of the suffering messiah, others that it is an attack on the Jerusalem branch of the church for resisting the extension of the gospel to the gentiles, or a mirror of the convert's usual experience of the initial enthusiasm followed by growing awareness of the necessity for suffering. It certainly reflects the strong theme in Mark of Jesus as the "suffering just one" portrayed in so many of the books of the Jewish scriptures, from Jeremiah to Job and the Psalms, but especially in the "Suffering Servant" passages in Isaiah. It also reflects the Jewish scripture theme of God's love being met by infidelity and failure, only to be renewed by God. The failure of the disciples and Jesus' denial by Peter himself would have been powerful symbols of faith, hope and reconciliation for Christians.

=== The performance of miracles called magic ===
Mark contains twenty accounts of miracles and healings, accounting for almost a third of the gospel and half of the first ten chapters, more, proportionally, than in any other gospel. In the gospels as a whole, Jesus' miracles, prophecies, etc., are presented as evidence of God's rule, but Mark's descriptions of Jesus' healings are a partial exception to this, as his methods, using spittle to heal blindness and words or phrases that act like magic formulae, were those of a magician. The charge the Jewish religious leaders bring against Jesus is based upon this similarity: they say he is performing exorcisms with the aid of an evil spirit and calling up the spirit of John the Baptist. "There was [...] no period in the history of the [Roman] empire in which the magician was not considered an enemy of society," subject to penalties ranging from exile to death, says Classical scholar Ramsay MacMullen. All the gospels defend Jesus against this charge, which, if true, would contradict their ultimate claims for him. The point of the Beelzebub incident in Mark is to set forth Jesus' claims to be an instrument of God, not Satan.

=== Messianic Secret ===
In 1901, William Wrede identified the "Messianic Secret" – Jesus' secrecy about his identity as the messiah – as one of Mark's central themes. Wrede argued that the elements of the secret – Jesus' silencing of the demons, the obtuseness of the disciples regarding his identity, and the concealment of the truth inside parables – were fictions and arose from the tension between the Church's post-resurrection messianic belief and the historical reality of Jesus. There remains continuing debate over how far the "secret" originated with Mark and how far he got it from tradition, and how far, if at all, it represents the self-understanding and practices of the historical Jesus.

=== Christology ===
Christology means a doctrine or understanding concerning the person or nature of Christ. In the New Testament writings it is frequently conveyed through the titles applied to Jesus. Most scholars agree that "Son of God" is the most important of these titles in Mark. It appears on the lips of God himself at the baptism and the transfiguration, and is Jesus' own self-designation. These and other instances provide reliable evidence of how the evangelist perceived Jesus, but it is not clear just what the title meant to Mark and his 1st-century audience. The term "Son of God" had certain meanings in the Hebrew Scriptures and among Jews, including referring to an angel, the nation of Israel as God's people, a suffering righteous man, simply a man, or an earthly king adopted by God as his son at his enthronement, legitimizing his rule over Israel. Some earlier scholarship attempted to use the concept of a "divine man" to argue the gospels were 'aretalogies', or narrative accounts of the deeds of a hero or god such as Hercules or the Egyptian pharaohs. However, Helen Bond notes that apart from the problematic notion of a 'divine man', there is little evidence that aretalogy represented a distinct genre. Ulrich Luz and Armin Baum find the four gospels to be biographies of Jesus in the style of the Hebrew Bible and rabbinic works with relatively little Greco-Roman influence. A connection with the Elijah-Elisha narrative in 1 and 2 Kings has been posited, though most scholars view this narrative as a background for Mark rather than a direct model or source.

Mark does not explicitly state what he means by "Son of God", nor when the sonship was conferred. According to Burkett, Mark conceived of Jesus becoming God's son at his baptism, while "Son of God" referred to the relationship then established for him by God. However, other scholars dispute this interpretation and instead hold that Jesus is already presented as God's son even before his baptism in Mark.

Boring argues Mark does not mention a miraculous birth nor any doctrine of pre-existence, while Winn and Wilhite find a divine Christology present in the gospel.

Mark also calls Jesus "christos" (Christ), translating the Hebrew "messiah" (anointed person). In the Old Testament the term messiah described prophets, priests and kings. By the time of Jesus, with the kingdom long vanished, it had come to mean an eschatological king far greater than all God's previous messengers, endowed with miraculous powers, free from sin, ruling in justice and glory who would appear at the end of the age to usher in an earthly kingdom. The earliest Jewish Christian community saw Jesus as a messiah in this Jewish sense as a divinely appointed regent; but they also believed in Jesus' resurrection and exaltation to heaven, and an emerging consensus places the advent of high Christology with the earliest disciples in Jerusalem. The most important occurrences are in the context of Jesus' death and suffering, suggesting that, for Mark, Jesus can only be fully understood in that context.

A third important title, "Son of Man", has its roots in Ezekiel, the Book of Enoch, (a popular Jewish apocalyptic work of the period), and especially in Daniel 7:13–14, where the Son of Man is assigned royal roles of dominion, kingship and glory. Mark 14:62 combines more scriptural allusions: before he comes on clouds the Son of Man will be seated on the right hand of God. In the Old Testament, the cloud is the garment or dwelling-place of deity, the symbol of its presence in the midst of the people. Isaiah 19:1 lauds the "Lord riding upon a soft cloud"; at the transfiguration, the cloud was the sign of God's presence on the mountain (Matt 17:5 and parallels); and on the day of his ascension, Jesus was taken up in a cloud. The equivalence of these three titles, Christ, Son of God, Son of Man, the common element being the reference to kingly power.

== Comparison with other writings ==
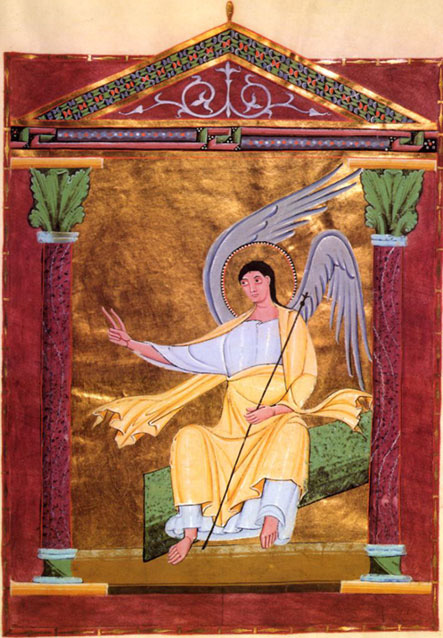
"Entering into the sepulchre, they saw a young man sitting on the right side, clothed in a long white garment" – Mark's description of the discovery of the empty tomb (from the Pericopes of Henry II)

=== Mark and the New Testament ===
All four gospels tell a story in which Jesus' death and resurrection are the crucial redemptive events. Unlike Matthew and Luke, the author does not mention a virgin birth or indicate whether Jesus had a normal human parentage and makes no attempt to trace Jesus' ancestry back to King David or Adam with a genealogy; subsequent evangelists continually added more details to the life of Jesus. Whilst not as overt as John, scholars have found that the Synoptic gospels portray Jesus as divine in various ways, both as a divinity in a general sense and as a manifestation of the God of Israel. Many commentators argue that Mark portrays Jesus as the divine Lord in his preface.

Many scholars find a conditional understanding of eschatology in the gospels, with the date of the parousia (also known as the Second Coming) being dependent on Israel's repentance rather than being fixed, and the expectation is reflected in the Pauline Epistles, the Epistle of James, the Epistle to the Hebrews and in the Book of Revelation. According to Burkett, the return failed and early Christians revised their understanding, while according to Christopher Hays, Dale Allison, and Craig Keener, the delay of the parousia is consistent with the way ancient Jewish prophecy was understood contingently. Some acknowledged that the Second Coming had been delayed, but still expected it; others redefined the focus of the promise, the Gospel of John spoke of "eternal life" as something available in the present; while still others concluded that Jesus would not return at all (the Second Epistle of Peter argues against those who held the view that Jesus would not return at all). Other scholars, however, contend that all four gospels show an eschatology wherein many of the eschatological topics concern the destruction of the Jewish Temple, the transfiguration and resurrection of Jesus, whereas his return is a promise for an undisclosed time in the future which people should always be ready for. Other scholars, like those of the Jesus Seminar, believe that the apocalyptic language in Mark and the rest of the gospels are inventions of the gospel writers and the early Christians for theological and cultural purposes.

Luke and Matthew use Mark more conservatively than other ancient historians such as Diodorus Siculus or Josephus, though parallels and variations of the Synoptic gospels are typical of ancient historical biographies. Later gospels add more positive allusions to the resurrection and submission to God's will to Mark's despairing death of Jesus.

=== Content unique to Mark ===
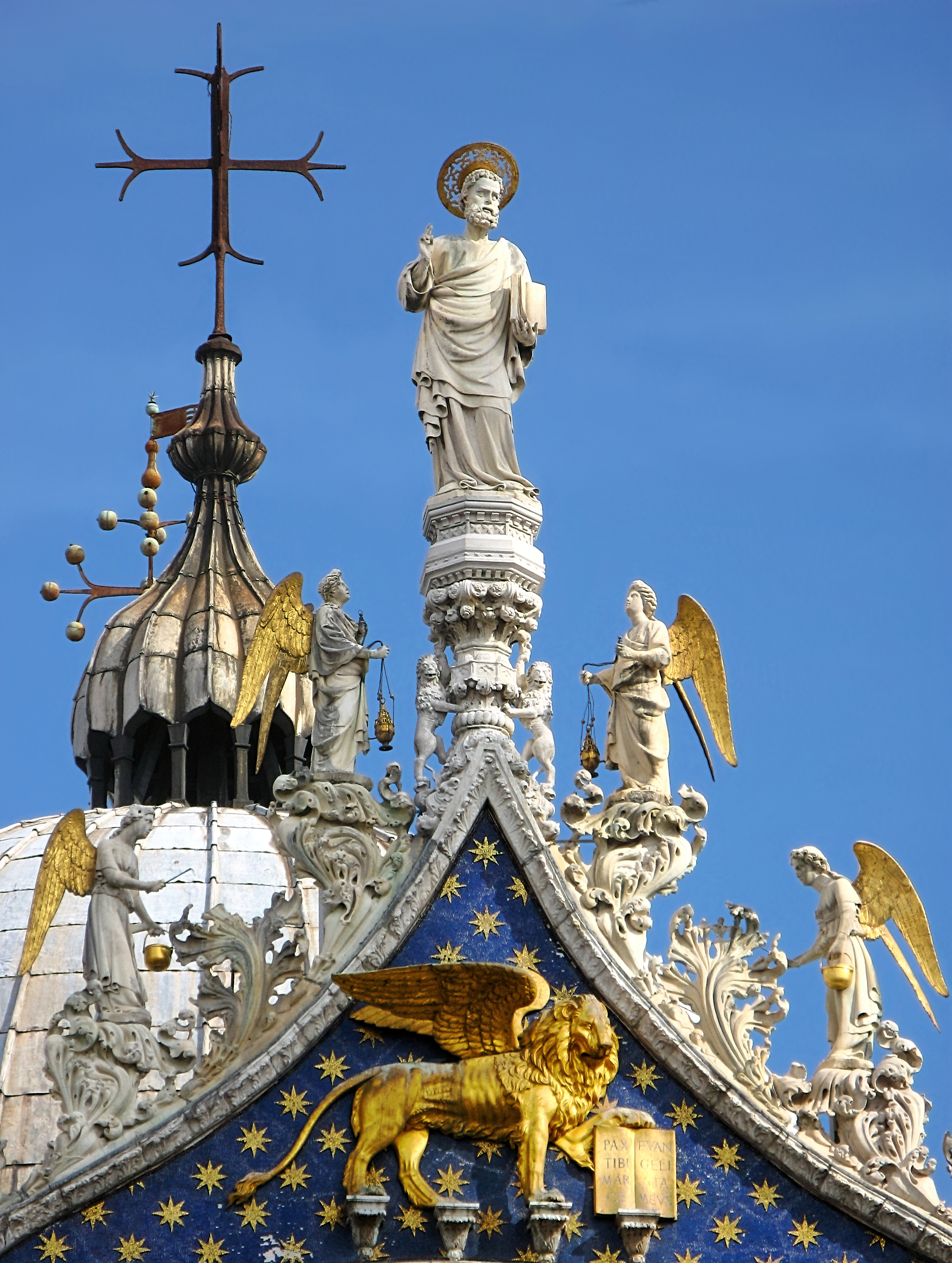
St. Mark with angels, holding his gospel. His symbol, the winged lion, also appears with him. Detail from St Mark's Basilica, Venice.

- The Sabbath was made for man, not man for the Sabbath. Mark 2:27 (Note: Similar to a rabbinical saying from the 2nd century BC, "The Sabbath is given over to you ["the son of man"], and not you to the Sabbath." (Kohler 1905)) Not present in either Matthew 12:1–8 or Luke 6:1–5. This is also a so-called "Western non-interpolation". The passage is not found in the Western text of Mark.
- People were saying, "[Jesus] has gone out of his mind", see also Rejection of Jesus.
- Mark is the only gospel with the combination of verses in Mark 4:24–25: the other gospels split them up, Mark 4:24 being found in Luke 6:38 and Matthew 7:2, Mark 4:25 in Matthew 13:12 and Matthew 25:29, Luke 8:18 and Luke 19:26.
- The Parable of the Growing Seed.
- Only Mark counts the possessed swine; there are about two thousand.
- Two consecutive healing stories of women; both make use of the number twelve.
- Only Mark gives healing commands of Jesus in the (presumably original) Aramaic: Talitha koum, Ephphatha. See Aramaic of Jesus.
- Only place in the New Testament where Jesus is referred to as "the son of Mary".
- Mark is the only gospel where Jesus himself is called a carpenter; in Matthew he is called a carpenter's son.
- Only place that both names his brothers and mentions his sisters; Matthew has a slightly different name for one brother.
- The taking of a staff and sandals is permitted in Mark 6:8–9 but prohibited in Matthew 10:9–10 and Luke 9:3.
- Only Mark refers to Herod Antipas as a king; Matthew and Luke refer to him (more properly) as an Herodian tetrarch.
- The longest version of the story of Herodias' daughter's dance and the beheading of John the Baptist.
- Mark's literary cycles:

- 6:30–44 – Feeding of the five thousand;
- 6:45–56 – Crossing of the lake;
- 7:1–13 – Dispute with the Pharisees;
- 7:14–23 – Discourse on Defilement
Then:
- 8:1–9 – Feeding of the four thousand;
- 8:10 – Crossing of the lake;
- 8:11–13 – Dispute with the Pharisees;
- 8:14–21 – Incident of no bread and discourse about the leaven of the Pharisees.

- Customs that at that time were unique to Jews are explained (hand, produce, and utensil washing): Mark 7:3–4.
- "Thus he declared all foods clean". (Note: The verb katharizo means both "to declare to be clean" and "to purify." The Scholars Version has: "This is how everything we eat is purified", Gaus' Unvarnished New Testament has: "purging all that is eaten.") Mark 7:19 NRSVue, not found in the Matthean parallel Matthew 15:15–20.
- There is no mention of Samaritans.
- Jesus heals using his fingers and spit at the same time: 7:33; cf. 8:23, Luke 11:20, John 9:6, Matthew 8:16.
- Jesus lays his hands on a blind man twice in curing him: 8:23–25; cf. 5:23, 16:18, Acts 6:6, Acts 9:17, Acts 28:8, laying on of hands.
- Jesus cites the Shema Yisrael: "Hear O Israel ..."; in the parallels of Matt 22:37–38 and Luke 10:27 the first part of the Shema is absent.
- Mark points out that the Mount of Olives is across from the Temple.
- When Jesus is arrested, a naked young man flees. A young man in a robe also appears in Mark 16:5–7.
- Mark does not name the High Priest.
- Witness testimony against Jesus does not agree.
- The cock crows "twice" as predicted. See also Fayyum Fragment. The other Gospels simply record, "the cock crew". Early codices 01, W, and most Western texts have the simpler version.
- Pilate's position (Governor) is not specified.
- Simon of Cyrene's sons are named.
- A summoned centurion is questioned.
- The women ask each other who will roll away the stone.
- A young man sits on the "right side".
- Mark is the only canonical gospel with significant various alternative endings. (Note: See Mark 16 § Alternate endings) Most of the contents of the traditional "Longer Ending" (Mark 16:9–20) are found in other New Testament texts and are not unique to Mark, see Mark 16 § Longer ending, the one significant exception being Mark 16:18b ("and if they drink any deadly thing, it shall not hurt them"), which is unique to Mark.

== See also ==
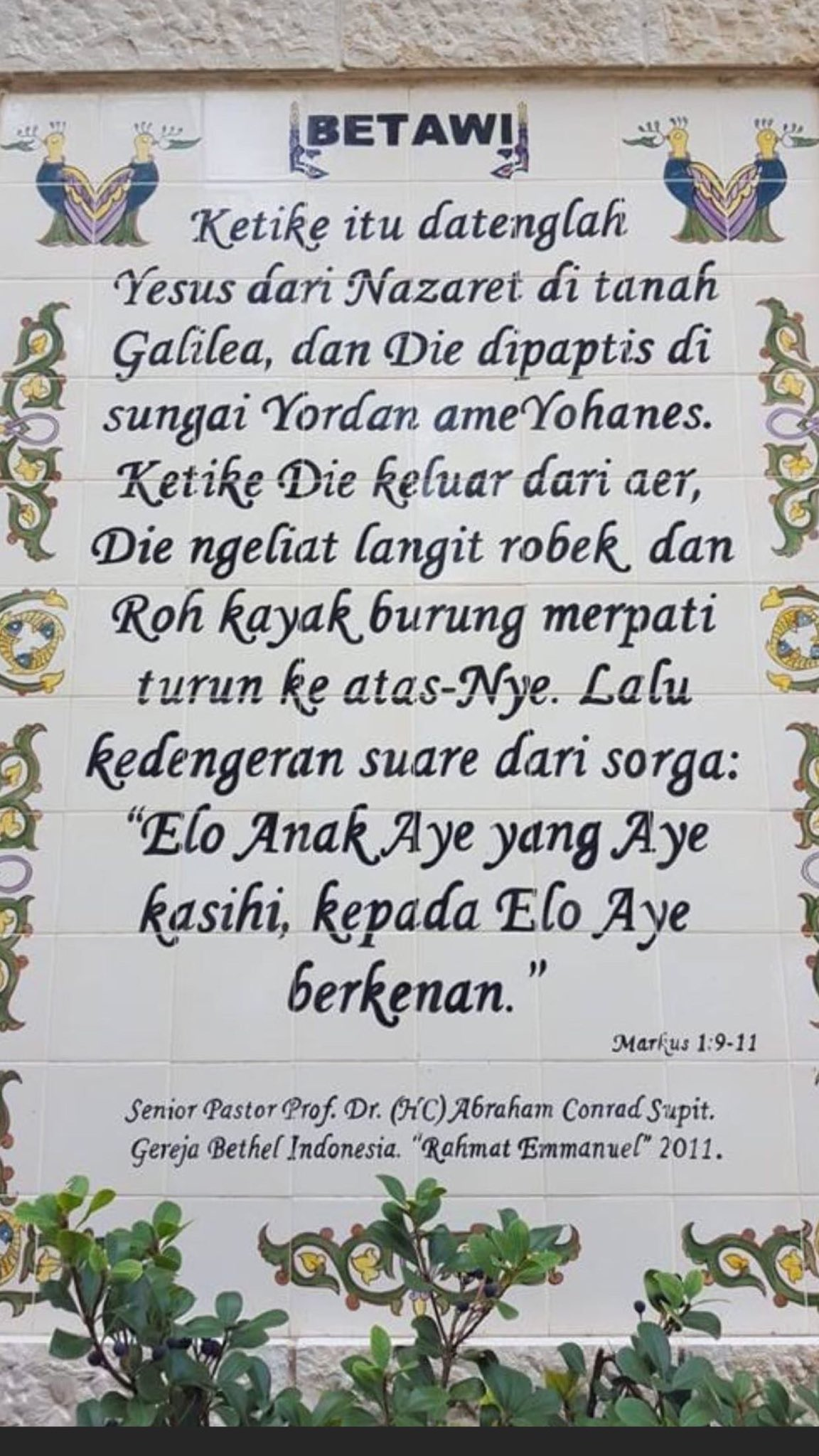
Gospel of Mark 1:9–11 in Jakartan Malay creole

- Acts of the Apostles (genre)
- Apocalyptic literature
- Gospel harmony
- Gospel of Mark (intertextuality)
- List of Gospels
- List of omitted Bible verses
- Sanhedrin Trial of Jesus (reference to Mark)
- Secret Gospel of Mark
- Textual variants in the Gospel of Mark
- Two-source hypothesis

== Sources ==
- Aune, David E. (1987). The New Testament in its Literary Environment. Westminster John Knox Press. ISBN 978-0-664-25018-8.
- Boring, M. Eugene (2006). Mark: A Commentary. Presbyterian Publishing Corp. ISBN 978-0-664-22107-2.
- Brown, Raymond E. (1997). An Introduction to the New Testament. Doubleday. ISBN 978-0-385-24767-2.
- Burkett, Delbert (2002). An introduction to the New Testament and the origins of Christianity. Cambridge University Press. ISBN 978-0-521-00720-7.
- Charlesworth, James (2013). The Tomb of Jesus and His Family?: Exploring Ancient Jewish Tombs Near Jerusalem's Walls. Wm. B. Eerdmans Publishing. ISBN 978-0-8028-6745-2.
- Cole, R. Alan (1989). The Gospel According to Mark: An Introduction and Commentary (2 ed.). Wm. B. Eerdmans Publishing. ISBN 978-0-8028-0481-5.
- Collins, Adela Yarbro (2000). Cosmology and Eschatology in Jewish and Christian Apocalypticism. Brill. ISBN 978-90-04-11927-7.
- Collins, Adela Yarbro (2007). Mark: A Commentary. Minneapolis: Fortress Press. ISBN 978-0-8006-6078-9.
- Cross, Frank L.; Livingstone, Elizabeth A., eds. (2005) [1997]. "Messianic Secret". The Oxford Dictionary of the Christian Church (3 ed.). Oxford University Press. p. 1083. ISBN 978-0-19-280290-3.
- Crossley, James G. (2004). The Date of Mark's Gospel: Insight from the Law in Earliest Christianity (The Library of New Testament Studies). T & T Clark International. ISBN 978-0567081957.
- Donahue, John R. (2005) [2002]. The Gospel of Mark. Liturgical Press. ISBN 978-0-8146-5965-6.
- Dunn, James D.G. (2003). Jesus Remembered. Wm. B. Eerdmans Publishing. ISBN 978-0-8028-3931-2.
- Dunn, James D.G. (2005). "The Tradition". In Dunn, James D.G.; McKnight, Scot (eds.). The Historical Jesus in Recent Research. Eisenbrauns. ISBN 978-1-57506-100-9.
- Edwards, James (2002). The Gospel According to Mark. Wm. B. Eerdmans Publishing. ISBN 978-0-85111-778-2.
- Ehrman, Bart D. (1993). The Orthodox Corruption of Scripture: The Effect of Early Christological Controversies on the Text of the New Testament. Oxford University Press. ISBN 978-0-19-510279-6.
- Ehrman, Bart D. (2004). The New Testament. Oxford University Press, USA. ISBN 0-19-515462-2.
- Ehrman, Bart D. (2006). Peter, Paul and Mary Magdalene: The Followers of Jesus in History and Legend. Oxford University Press. pp. 6–10. ISBN 978-0-19-974113-7.
- Ehrman, Bart D. (2005). Lost Christianities: The Battles for Scripture and the Faiths We Never Knew. Oxford University Press. p. 235. ISBN 978-0-19-975668-1. "Most scholars today have abandoned these identifications..."
- Elliott, Neil (2014). "Messianic Secret". In Evans, Craig A. (ed.). The Routledge Encyclopedia of the Historical Jesus. Routledge. ISBN 9781317722243.
- France, R.T. (2002). The Gospel of Mark: A Commentary on the Greek text. Wm. B. Eerdmans Publishing. ISBN 978-0-8028-2446-2.
- Gamble, Harry Y. (1995). Books and Readers in the Early Church: A History of Early Christian Texts. Yale University Press. ISBN 978-0-300-06918-1.
- Goodacre, Mark (September 2021). Lawrence, Louise (ed.). "How Empty Was the Tomb?". Journal for the Study of the New Testament. 44 (1). SAGE Publications: 134–148. doi:10.1177/0142064X211023714. ISSN 1745-5294. S2CID 236233486.
- Grossman, Maxine (14 March 2011) [1997]. "Son of Man". In Berlin, Adele (ed.). The Oxford Dictionary of the Jewish Religion (2nd ed.). New York: Oxford University Press, USA. doi:10.1093/acref/9780199730049.001.0001. ISBN 978-0-19-973004-9.
- Head, Ivan (2004). "Mark as a Roman Document from the Year 69: Testing Martin Hengel's Thesis". Journal of Religious History. 28 (3): 240–259. doi:10.1111/j.1467-9809.2004.00242.x.
- Hengel, Martin (1985). Studies in the Gospel of Mark. London: SCM.
- Horsely, Richard A. (2007). "Mark". In Coogan, Michael David; Brettler, Marc Zvi; Newsom, Carol Ann (eds.). The New Oxford Annotated Bible with the Apocryphal/Deuterocanonical Books: New Revised Standard Version. Oxford University Press. pp. 56–92 New Testament. ISBN 978-0-19-528881-0.
- Hurtado, Larry W. (2005) [2003]. Lord Jesus Christ: Devotion to Jesus in Earliest Christianity. Wm. B. Eerdmans Publishing. ISBN 978-0-8028-3167-5.
- Hurtado, Larry W. (2021). "Mark's Presentation of Jesus". In Kirk, J. R. Daniel; Winn, Adam; Huebenthal, Sandra; Hurtado, L. W. (eds.). Christology in Mark's Gospel: Four Views. Zondervan Academic. p. 96. ISBN 978-0-310-53872-1.
- Incigneri, Brian J. (2003). The Gospel to the Romans: The Setting and Rhetoric of Mark's Gospel. Biblical Interpretation Series. Vol. 65. Leiden: Brill.
- Iverson, Kelly R. (2011). "Wherever the Gospel Is Preached': The Paradox of Secrecy in the Gospel of Mark". In Iverson, Kelly R.; Skinner, Christopher W. (eds.). Mark as Story: Retrospect and Prospect. SBL. ISBN 9781589835481.
- Kee, Howard Clark (1993). "Magic and Divination". In Coogan, Michael David; Metzger, Bruce M. (eds.). The Oxford Companion to the Bible. Oxford University Press. pp. 483–84. ISBN 978-0-19-504645-8.
- Keith, Chris (2016). "The Pericope Adulterae: A theory of attentive insertion". In Black, David Alan; Cerone, Jacob N. (eds.). The Pericope of the Adulteress in Contemporary Research. The Library of New Testament Studies. Bloomsbury Publishing. p. 92. ISBN 978-0-567-66580-5.
- Kloppenborg, John S. (2005). "Evocatio deorum and the Date of Mark". Journal of Biblical Literature. 124 (3): 419–450. doi:10.2307/30041033. JSTOR 30041033.
- Koester, Helmut (2000) [1982]. Introduction to the New Testament: History and literature of early Christianity (2 ed.). Walter de Gruyter. ISBN 978-0-567-16561-9.
- Kohler, Kaufmann (1905). "New Testament". In Singer, Isidore; et al. (eds.). The Jewish Encyclopedia. Vol. 9. New York: Funk & Wagnalls. p. 246-254.
- Leander, Hans (2013). Discourses of Empire: The Gospel of Mark from a Postcolonial Perspective. Atlanta: Society of Biblical Literature. ISBN 978-1-58983-889-5.
- Levine, Amy-Jill; Brettler, Marc Z. (3 November 2011). The Jewish Annotated New Testament. Oxford: OUP USA. ISBN 978-0-19-529770-6.
- Lincoln, Andrew (2004). "Reading John". In Porter, Stanley E. (ed.). Reading the Gospels Today. Eerdmans. ISBN 978-0-8028-0517-1.
- Lössl, Josef (2010). The Early Church: History and Memory. Continuum. ISBN 978-0-567-16561-9.
- Marcus, Joel (2000). Eerdmans Dictionary of the Bible. Eerdmans. ISBN 978-90-5356-503-2.
- Metzger, Bruce M. (2000). A Textual Commentary on the Greek New Testament (2nd ed.). Germany: United Bible Societies. ISBN 3-438-06010-8.
- Morris, Leon (1990) [1986]. New Testament Theology. Zondervan. ISBN 978-0-310-45571-4.
- Moyise, Steve (2013). Introduction to Biblical Studies. Bloomsbury. ISBN 978-0-567-18926-4.
- Perkins, Pheme (1998). "The Synoptic Gospels and the Acts of the Apostles: Telling the Christian Story". In Barton, John (ed.). The Cambridge companion to biblical interpretation. Westminster John Knox Press. pp. 241–58. ISBN 978-0-521-48593-7.
- Perkins, Pheme (2007). Introduction to the Synoptic Gospels. Wm. B. Eerdmans Publishing. ISBN 978-0-8028-6553-3.
- Powell, Mark Allan (1998). Jesus as a Figure in History: How Modern Historians View the Man from Galilee. Wm. B. Eerdmans Publishing. ISBN 978-0-664-25703-3.
- Reddish, Mitchell (2011). An Introduction to The Gospels. Abingdon Press, 2011. ISBN 978-1-4267-5008-3.
- Roskam, H.N. (2004). The purpose of the Gospel of Mark in its historical and social context. Brill. ISBN 978-90-474-1394-3.
- Sanders, E. P. (1995). The Historical Figure of Jesus. Penguin UK. ISBN 9780141928227.
- Schröter, Jens [in German] (2010). "The Gospel of Mark". In Aune, David E. (ed.). The Historical Jesus: A Comprehensive Guide. Wiley–Blackwell. pp. 272–95. ISBN 978-1-4051-0825-6.
- Smith, Stephen H. (1995). "A Divine Tragedy: Some Observations on the Dramatic Structure of Mark's Gospel". Novum Testamentum. 37 (3). E.J. Brill, Leiden: 209–31. doi:10.1163/1568536952662709. JSTOR 1561221.
- Strauss, Mark L. (2014). Mark. Zondervan Exegetical Commentary on the New Testament. Vol. 2. Grand Rapids, MI: Zondervan. ISBN 978-0-310-24358-8. OCLC 863695341.
- Strecker, Georg [in German] (2000). Theology of the New Testament. Walter de Gruyter. ISBN 978-0-664-22336-6.
- Telford, William R. (1999). The Theology of the Gospel of Mark. Cambridge University Press. ISBN 978-0-521-43977-0.
- Theissen, Gerd (1992). The Gospels in Context: Social and Political History in the Synoptic Tradition. Edinburgh: T&T Clark.
- Twelftree, Graham H. (1999). Jesus the miracle worker: a historical & theological study. InterVarsity Press. ISBN 978-0-8308-1596-8.
- Watts Henderson, Suzanne (2018). "The Gospel according to Mark". In Coogan, Michael; Brettler, Marc; Newsom, Carol; Perkins, Pheme (eds.). The New Oxford Annotated Bible: New Revised Standard Version. Oxford University Press. ISBN 978-0-19-027605-8.
- Welch, John W. (2006). "Miracles, Maleficium, and Maiestas in the Trial of Jesus". In Charlesworth, James H. (ed.). Jesus and Archaeology. Wm. B. Eerdmans Publishing. ISBN 978-0-8028-4880-2.
- Williams, Guy J. (March 2013). Lawrence, Louise (ed.). "Narrative Space, Angelic Revelation, and the End of Mark's Gospel". Journal for the Study of the New Testament. 35 (3). SAGE Publications: 263–284. doi:10.1177/0142064X12472118. ISSN 1745-5294. S2CID 171065040.
- Williamson, Lamar (1983). Mark. John Knox Press. ISBN 978-0-664-23760-8.
- Winn, Adam (2008). The purpose of Mark's gospel. Mohr Siebeck. ISBN 978-3-16-149635-6.
- Witherington, Ben (2001). The Gospel of Mark: A Socio-rhetorical Commentary. Wm. B. Eerdmans Publishing. ISBN 978-0-8028-4503-0.

Gospel of Mark Synoptic Gospel
Preceded by Gospel of Matthew	New Testament; Books of the Bible	Succeeded by Gospel of Luke
