= Clearing the Channel =

Studio album by Sinch
- Released: March 22, 2005
- Genre: Post-grunge, alternative rock, progressive rock
- Length: 46:09
- Label: Rock Ridge Music
- Producer: Drew Mazurek

Sinch chronology
Sinch (2002)	Clearing the Channel (2005)	Live Cuts (EP) (2005)

Professional ratings
Review scores
Source	Rating
411Mania	(9/10)
AllMusic	3/5 stars
Legends Magazine	(average)

Clearing the Channel is Sinch's follow-up to their 2002 self-titled album. The band signed up with independent rock label Rock Ridge Music for this release, after their contract with Roadrunner Records wasn't renewed.

== Track listing ==
No.	Title	Length
1.	"Silence Broken"	5:24
2.	"All That's Left Behind"	3:28
3.	"Identity Theft"	3:34
4.	"The Last Scene"	4:20
5.	"Dead Sentinels"	3:24
6.	"Sails"	4:03
7.	"Vanishing Act"	3:25
8.	"The Power Of Suggestion"	3:57
9.	"What They Mean When They Say"	4:33
10.	"One In The Same"	4:01
11.	"Hydroplane"	5:50
