= Garett Jones =

American economist and author (born 1970)

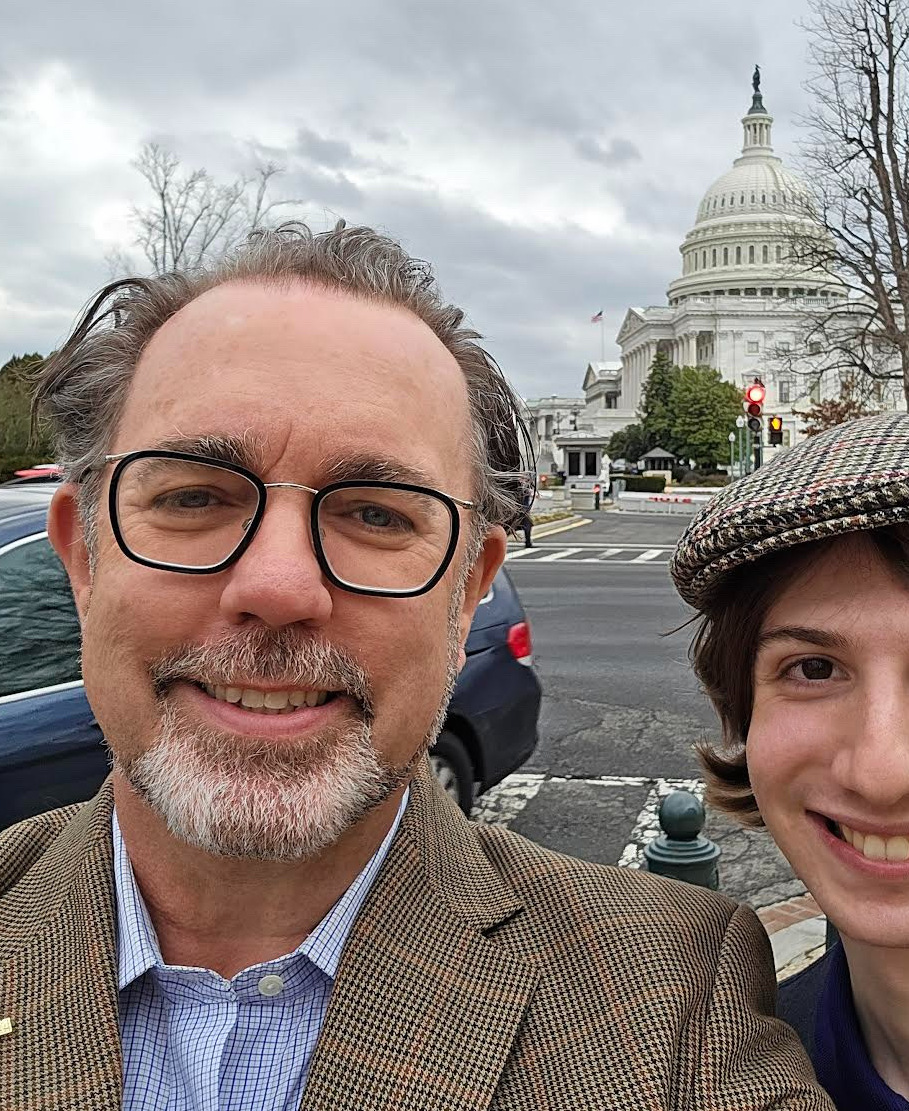
- Jones in 2024
- Born: April 6, 1970 (age 56)

Academic work
- Discipline: Economics
- Website: Official website

Garett Jones (born April 6, 1970) is an American economist and author. His research pertains to the fields of macroeconomics, monetary policy, IQ in relation to productivity, short-term business cycles, and economic development. He is a professor at George Mason University and has held the BB&T Professorship for the Study of Capitalism at the Mercatus Center.

== Early life and education ==
Jones has written that he was raised as a Mormon but left the church as a young adult. His grandmother was Jewish. He completed a B.A. in history with a minor in sociology from Brigham Young University in 1992. He did an M.P.A. in public affairs at Cornell University in 1993, followed by an M.A. in political science at the University of California, Berkeley in 1994. Jones completed a Ph.D. in economics at the University of California, San Diego in 2000.

== Academic career ==
After holding a number of visiting scholar and other academic positions, Jones joined the faculty of George Mason University in 2007. In 2026, he became a visiting fellow at the Hoover Institution.

He served on the editorial board of the Journal of Neuroscience, Psychology, and Economics from 2011 to 2018.

=== Research on IQ and its role in productivity and economic growth ===
In a 2006 paper with W. Joel Schneider, Jones reported that national average IQ was a statistically significant explanatory variable in cross-country regressions of economic growth, using data from Richard Lynn and Tatu Vanhanen's IQ and the Wealth of Nations. In Hive Mind, Jones contrasted the modest association between individual IQ and earnings with the much larger association between national average IQ and prosperity.

Jones' further research has been on identifying the causal mechanisms by which IQ might affect productivity and economic growth at a national level. One mechanism posited by Jones is that smarter groups tend to be better at arriving at and enforcing norms of cooperation. Jones has used a meta-analysis of repeated prisoner's dilemma experiments, combined with universities' average SAT scores, to offer support for this hypothesis. In a repeated stag hunt experiment, Jones and his coauthors found that patience predicted coordination and payoffs, while cognitive ability had no statistically significant effect on outcomes.

Jones has argued that, in his model, certain sectors requiring very high quality work and with very low error-tolerance depend on high-skilled workers, because in such sectors, it is not possible to replace a single highly skilled worker with multiple less-skilled workers and achieve the same output. Building on O-ring theory, Jones calls such sectors "O-Ring sectors", in contrast to "foolproof sectors", where a larger workforce of people with lower productivity can produce the same output as a smaller workforce of people with high productivity.

Jones offers a summary of his and others' research on the relationship between IQ and national productivity in an article for The New Palgrave Dictionary of Economics.

=== Research on money ===
Some of Jones' research has focused on the role of money and monetary policy. He has also proposed "speed bankruptcy", involving debt-to-equity conversions to recapitalize failing financial institutions.

== Books ==
Jones wrote the book Hive Mind: How Your Nation's IQ Matters So Much More Than Your Own, which builds on his research on the relationship between IQ and national productivity. It was released in November 2015 by Stanford University Press. Reviewing the book in Governance, Fred Thompson praised its clarity but criticized its limited treatment of social segregation and migration.

He was the editor of the book Banking Crises: Perspectives from The New Palgrave Dictionary of Economics (2015; e-book 2016), produced for The New Palgrave Dictionary of Economics.

In 2015, Jones gave a presentation titled 10% Less Democracy: How Less Voting Could Mean Better Governance. His book 10% Less Democracy: Why You Should Trust Elites a Little More and the Masses a Little Less was published in February 2020.

In November 2022, Jones published The Culture Transplant: How Migrants Make the Economies They Move to a Lot Like the Ones They Left. His books Hive Mind, 10% Less Democracy, and The Culture Transplant form his "Singapore Trilogy".

== Media appearances ==
Jones was a guest blogger for EconLog from September 2012 to April 2013. He has given his opinion on macroeconomic policy and financial crises on CNBC and in other media.
