= Coalescence =

Coalesce, coalescence or coalescent can refer to:

== Chemistry and physics ==
- Coalescence (chemistry), the process by which two or more separate masses of miscible substances seem to "pull" each other together should they make the slightest contact
- Coalescence (physics), the merging of two or more droplets, bubbles or particles into one
- Coalescer, device which induces coalescence in a medium

== Computer science ==
- Coalescence (computer science), the act of merging adjacent free blocks of memory to fill gaps caused by memory deallocation
- COALESCE, an SQL function that selects the first non-null from a range of values
- Null coalescing operator, a binary operator that is part of the syntax for a basic conditional expression in several programming languages
- Coalesced hashing, a strategy of hash collision resolution in computing
- Interrupt coalescing, a technique where events which would normally trigger a hardware interrupt are held back until either a certain amount of work is pending or a timeout timer triggers
- Timer coalescing, an energy-saving technique for processors

== Other fields of science ==
- Coalescence (genetics) or the coalescent theory, the merging of genetic lineages backwards to a most recent common ancestor, in other words a model of how alleles sampled from a population may have originated from a common ancestor
- Coalescence (linguistics), also known as fusion (phonetics) or vowel coalescence, a sound change where two or more phonological segments with distinctive features merge into a single segment
- In geography, the process by which urban sprawl produces a linear conurbation
- Microvoid coalescence (materials science), a high energy microscopic fracture mechanism observed in the majority of metallic alloys and in some engineering plastics

== Popular culture ==
- Coalesce (band), a metalcore band from Kansas City, Missouri, active from 1994 to 1999, 2005–
  - Coalesce discography, a list of Coalesce's albums and songs
  - Coalesce / Boysetsfire, a split music album released in 2000, by the bands Boysetsfire and Coalesce covering each other
- Coalescence (Whit Dickey album), a 2004 jazz album
- Coalescence (Andre Canniere album), a 2013 jazz album
- Coalescent, a 2003 science-fiction novel
- Coalescence (song), a song by Chris Christodoulou for the 2013 game Risk of Rain

== See also ==
- Coalition, when people temporarily work together to achieve a common goal
- Coalesse, a U.S. based furniture company
- Mind coalescence, a term related to collective intelligence
