= Hive Mind (book) =

2015 book by Garett Jones

- First edition
- Author: Garett Jones
- Language: English
- Published: 2015
- Publisher: Stanford University Press
- Pages: 224
- ISBN: 978-0-8047-8596-9

Hive Mind: How Your Nation's IQ Matters So Much More Than Your Own is a book by Garett Jones, published in 2015 by Stanford University Press. It explores the relationship between individual IQ, national average IQ and economic prosperity. The book argues that a nation's average IQ is more strongly associated with the nation's prosperity than an individual's IQ is with their income. Jones argues that higher average IQ improves a country's fortunes via multiple channels, such as better institutions.

== Synopsis ==
Jones argues that cognitive skills produce benefits beyond the individual through saving, cooperation, political decision-making, teamwork and social influence. Drawing on the O-ring theory of economic development, he describes how small differences in workers' skills can produce large differences in team productivity when tasks are interdependent. He also discusses the Flynn effect and the potential for health, nutrition and education to raise cognitive skills, while acknowledging uncertainty about how best to achieve lasting improvements.

=== Da Vinci effect ===
The book relates personal intelligence to group intelligence with a concept the author calls the da Vinci effect. This concept describes the tendency of an individual performing well on one cognitive task to perform well on others, relating it to general intelligence. Jones also applies the concept to national average test scores.

== Reception ==
The book was reviewed by Scott Alexander on Slate Star Codex and Stuart Ritchie.

Alexander praised the book's readability and discussion of research, but questioned whether its evidence established that higher national IQ causes prosperity, rather than prosperity raising IQ.

Writing in Governance, Fred Thompson praised the book's clarity and described it as possibly the year's most important economics book. He argued, however, that it neglected how social segregation might limit the benefits of imitation, and found its explanations of wage differences and international migration insufficiently developed.

The book won the gold medal in the Finance/Investment/Economics category of the 2016 Independent Publisher Book Awards.
