= Cinch =

Cinch may refer to:

- A cinch, (alternate spelling sinch) a type of saddle girth (tack)
- A belay device for sport climbing
- RCA connector, which is sometimes known as a CINCH/AV connector
- Cinch (card game), an American card game in the All Fours family, related to Pitch/Setup and Pedro
- Cinch (company)

== See also ==
- Waist cincher
- Sinch (disambiguation)
