= Discourse on Defilement =

Account of the teaching of Jesus

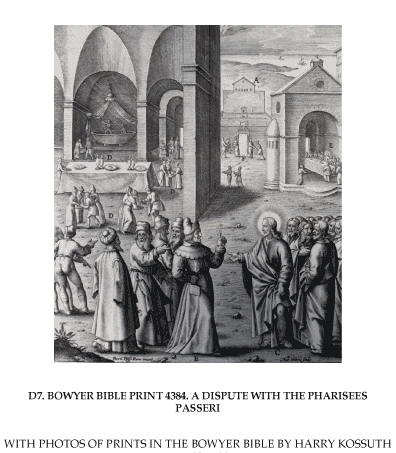
Jesus disputes with the Pharisees over cleanliness, from the Bowyer Bible, 19th century.

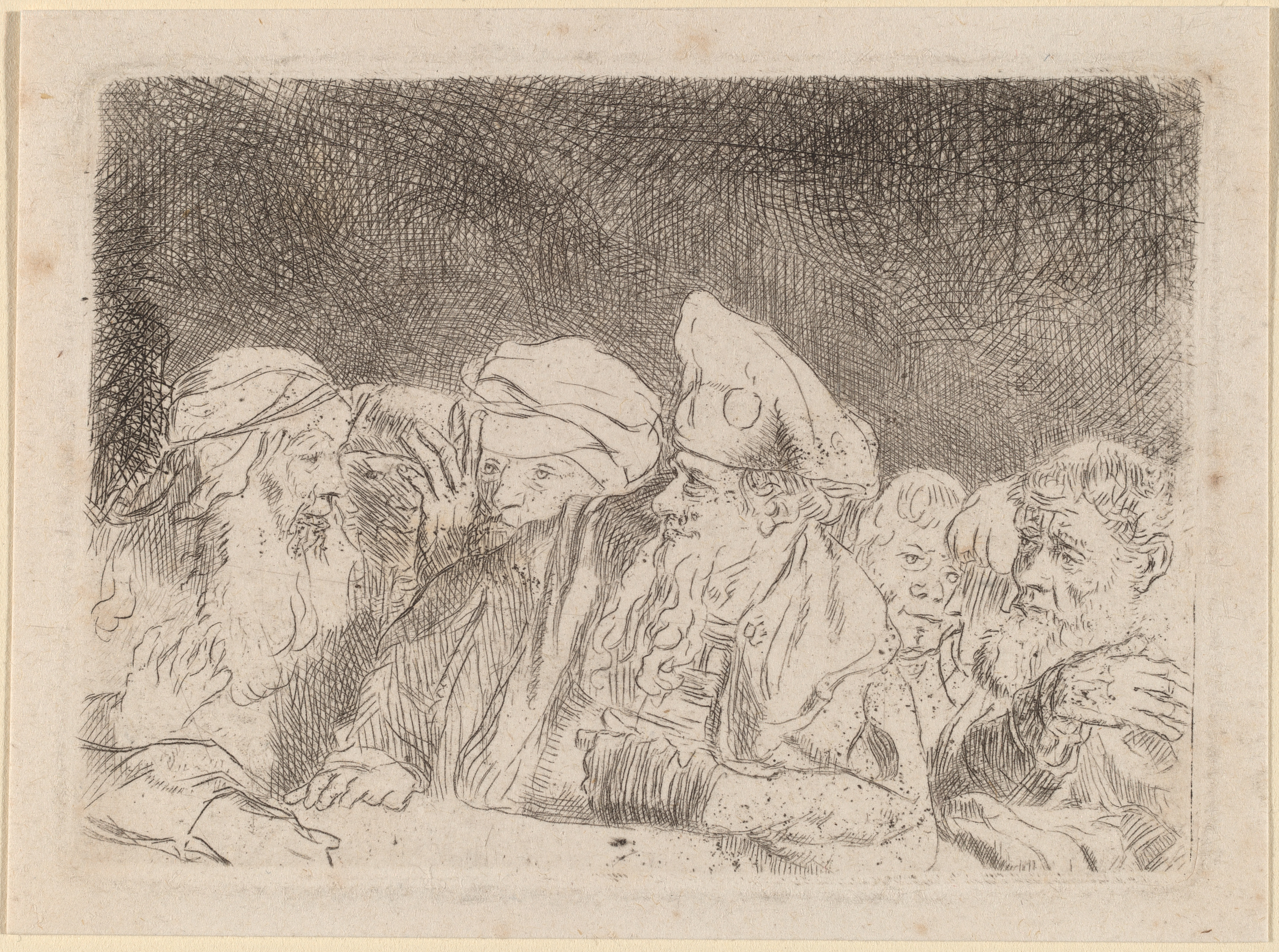
Rembrandt van Rijn and William Baillie, The Pharisees Debating (Fragment from the Hundred Guilder Print), c. 1649

The Discourse on Defilement is an account of the teaching of Jesus recorded in the New Testament in the Gospel of Matthew 15:1–20 and the Gospel of Mark 7:1–23.

In the account in the Gospel of Matthew, the Pharisees complain to Jesus that his disciples break the tradition of the elders because they do not wash their hands before eating. Jesus responds:

Listen and understand. What goes into a man's mouth does not make him 'unclean', but what comes out of his mouth, that is what makes him 'unclean.'

Matthew uses the occasion to identify other Pharasaic teachings which Jesus says annul the commandment of God, to quote further from the prophecies of Isaiah which are repeatedly referenced by Matthew, to note, without concern, that the Pharisees were offended by Jesus' reply to them (Matthew 15:12), and to refer again to the disciples' lack of understanding highlighted by the apostle Peter's request for an explanation: "Explain this parable to us" (Matthew 15:15).

The Cambridge Bible for Schools and Colleges treats this interchange as evidence of the influence of the Pharisees at the time of Jesus: "the disciples believed that Christ would be concerned to have offended those who stood so high in popular favour".

The Gospel of Mark has a similar account, in which Jesus explains how a man is defiled by evil that comes out of him:

What comes out of a man is what makes him 'unclean.' For from within, out of men's hearts, come evil thoughts, sexual immorality, theft, murder, adultery, greed, malice, deceit, lewdness, envy, slander, arrogance and folly. All these evils come from inside and make a man 'unclean.'

== See also ==
- Chronology of Jesus
- Gospel harmony
