= HiveMind =

Proposed real life simulation video game

- Developer: HiveMind
- Designer: Will Wright
- Genre: Simulation
- Modes: Single-player, multiplayer

HiveMind was a proposed real life simulation designed by Will Wright's company of the same name.

== History ==
Wright called it "personal gaming", in which the player's interests affect the content of the game, saying, "Rather than craft a game like FarmVille for players to learn and play, we learn about you and your routines and incorporate that into a form of game play". The game was designed to harvest data about the players in order to create content. It would not initiate this process, but would be permitted to do so by players. It was described as "an immersive game that uses real-world information about a user to develop a unique in-game experience tailored to each player".

It was announced in early June 2012 that the entire project was on hold due to ongoing legal disputes between company executives. Said Wright, "Hivemind is still a company. But it has no money. No nothing. It's just sitting there because of the litigation. It is frozen. It's so complex and there's quite a bit of disappointment... We have to find out where this is going in the near term". On October 26, Wright and HiveMind co-founder Jawad Ansari stated they had settled their disagreements regarding the company. Wright said, "We are pleased to have reached a friendly and respectful resolution. Jawad's entrepreneurial energy, passion for the expansion of the online game industry and tenacious execution brought the necessary elements together to build Hive Mind to where the operating team can take the Company forward".

A release date for the game was never announced, and the project was shut down following the settlement in 2012.
