= O-ring theory of economic development =

Model of economic development

The O-ring theory of economic development is a model of economic development put forward by Michael Kremer in 1993, which proposes that tasks of production must be executed proficiently together in order for any of them to be of high value. The key feature of this model is positive assortative matching, whereby people with similar skill levels work together.

The theory seeks to explain why rich countries produce more complicated products, have larger firms and much higher worker productivity than poor countries.

The name is a reference to the 1986 Challenger shuttle disaster, a catastrophe caused by the failure of O-rings.

== Model ==
The model assumes that firms are risk-neutral, labor markets are competitive, workers supply labor inelastically, multiple low-skill workers cannot substitute for one high-skill worker within a production chain, and there is a sufficient complementarity of tasks.

Production is broken down into $n$ tasks. Laborers can use a multitude of techniques of varying efficiency to carry out these tasks depending on their skill. Skill is denoted by $q$, where $0 \le q \le 1$. Here $q$ is the expected fraction of maximum product value retained after a worker performs a task. It could represent the probability of a worker successfully completing a task, the quality of task completion expressed as a percentage, or the quality of task completion with the condition of a margin of error that could reduce quality. Kremer's original production function includes capital:

$$\operatorname{E}(Y)=k^{\alpha}nB\prod_{i=1}^{n}q_i,$$

where $k$ is capital, $\alpha$ its output elasticity, and $B$ output per worker with one unit of capital when all tasks are performed perfectly. Mistakes by different workers are assumed to be independent. For two tasks, holding capital fixed and absorbing the capital and scale terms into a constant $B$, the simplified production function is:

F(q_{i}, q_{j}) = Bq_{i}q_{j}

The important implication of this production function is positive assortative matching. This can be seen in a hypothetical four-person economy with two low skill workers (q_{L}) and two high skill workers (q_{H}). This equation dictates the productive efficiency of skill matching:

q_{H}^{2} + q_{L}^{2} ≥ 2q_{H}q_{L}

By this equation total product is maximized by pairing those with similar skill levels. The inequality follows from $(q_H-q_L)^2\geq0$. In competitive equilibrium, firms with more skilled coworkers can offer more for another skilled worker because the marginal return to that worker's skill is higher.

== Implications ==
There are several implications that can be derived from the model:

1. Workers performing the same task earn higher wages in a high-skill firm than in a low-skill firm;
2. Wages will be more than proportionately higher in developed countries than would be assumed by measurements of skill levels;
3. Workers will consider human capital investments in light of similar investments by those around them;
4. The effects of local bottlenecks are magnified which also reduces the expected returns to skill;
5. O-ring effects across firms can create national low-production traps.

When skill is imperfectly observed, matching can be imperfect. In Kremer's extension, this can lead to underinvestment in education: a worker's incentive to acquire skills increases with the expected skill of coworkers. Strong enough complementarity can generate multiple equilibria in human-capital investment.

This model offers an explanation for brain drain and international economic disparity. As Kremer puts it, "If strategic complementarity is sufficiently strong, microeconomically identical nations or groups within nations could settle into equilibria with different levels of human capital".

== Extensions ==
Kremer also considers sequential production in which defects can be detected between stages. In this version, higher-skilled workers are assigned to later stages because mistakes there destroy more valuable intermediate inputs.

Garett Jones (2013) builds upon Kremer's O-ring theory to model how differences in worker skills can be associated with large differences in international productivity levels alongside modest differences in wages within a country. For this purpose, he distinguishes between O-ring jobs—jobs featuring high strategic complementarities in terms of skill—and foolproof jobs—modeled with a Cobb–Douglas production function with diminishing returns to labor and workers' skills aggregated linearly—and assumes both production technologies to be available to all countries. In his benchmark equilibrium, small international variations in average worker skill per country can produce large international productivity differences but modest within-country wage differences. This result requires sufficiently few low-skilled workers that some high-skilled workers also enter the foolproof sector; the paper also examines cases with larger wage gaps.
