= Paek Se-yun =

North Korean politician

- Hangul: 백세윤
- Hanja: 白世允
- RR: Baek Seyun
- MR: Paek Seyun

Paek Se-yun, sometimes written Paek Se-yoon, is the president of North Korea's Korea Computer Company. He has served in that capacity since 2000. In the same year, he was awarded the Order of Kim Il Sung. Paek has also been an alternate member of the Central Committee of the Workers' Party of Korea since 1988. He was a delegate to the ninth Supreme People's Assembly, 1990–1998.

== Works ==
- Paek Se-yun (January 1989). "Let Us Rapidly Develop the Machine Tool Industry and the Electronic, Automation Industry To Forcefully Accelerate the Modernization of the People's Economy" (PDF). Kulloja. OCLC 9516938.

== See also ==
- Politics of North Korea
