= Sinch (band) =

American rock band

- Origin: Doylestown, Pennsylvania, U.S.
- Genres: Alternative metal, alternative rock, post-grunge, progressive rock
- Years active: 1994–2012
- Labels: Rock Ridge Music; Roadrunner Records
- Members: Jamie Stem; Tony Lannutti; Mike Abramson; Dan McFarland; Jay Smith
- Website: Sinch.net

Sinch is an American alternative rock band formed in 1994 in Doylestown, Pennsylvania.

== History ==
The alternative rock quartet, Sinch formed in 1994 while its members were attending different high schools in Doylestown and Willow Grove. To the dismay of parents and the bemusement of friends, the members of Sinch made a pact that upon leaving school they would dedicate themselves to the band rather than pursue college or the military.

In 1996 the band self-produced its first album titled, The Strychnine, earning it regular live slots along the East Coast. Two years later, Sinch released its second record titled, Diatribe, which gained them further notoriety and won them supporting slots with major label artists including KoЯn, Rob Zombie, Linkin Park and Chevelle.

This exposure was sufficient to garner the band a major label deal. In 2001, they signed with Roadrunner Records and produced their self-titled Sinch album with producer Malcolm Springer. The first single from the album was "Something More". It was released to radio stations worldwide and became one of the Top 100 active rock singles of 2002. Sinch's self-titled album became one of Roadrunner's highest selling debut releases, and ultimately went on to sell over 100,000 copies worldwide.

Sinch were released from Roadrunner Records mid-2004, after the label decided to pass up the option of renewing the band's contract. Their second major album titled, Clearing the Channel, was released on March 22, 2005 via independent label Rock Ridge Music.

At the start of 2009, Sinch started work on a fan-funded album project. They began recording in June of the same year, but due to the band members also holding down full-time jobs recording would take around two years to complete. By August 2011, the album was in the mixing stage and the release was being planned. The album, Hive Mind, was released as a digital download, available to those that contributed to the making of the album, on March 20, 2012.

Jay Smith was forced to withdraw from the band when he was diagnosed with ALS in 2014; the band has since released two tracks for Smith's benefit: "One Way Mirror" on July 31, 2015, and "You and Me" On September 8, 2018. In a blogpost, McFarland has also stated that going forward, all proceeds from Sinch's sale will go directly to Smith's "90 Days for a Cure" awareness campaign.

== The "Ocular Noise Machine" ==
During the height of their career, Sinch became known for their use of the "Ocular Noise Machine" or "Viditar", a guitar-shaped VJing control surface made of transparent lucite (acrylic glass) which is operated by the band's fifth member, Jay Smith. The device feeds computerized footage on to projector screens, and edits it in real-time during the band's live performances. The footage is edited via buttons on the machine's neck and knobs and sliders on its body. Used in conjunction with a PowerBook, the buttons allow the operator to select video files to display, whilst employing knobs and sliders to manipulate and apply special effects to the images. Fearing the device would be copied by another band or, worse, a corporation, Smith applied to have the device patented. Smith is also the founder of Livid Instruments, where he creates and sells his own line of video instruments.

== Band members ==
Current

- Jamie Stem – vocals (1994–present)
- Tony Lannutti – guitar (1994–present)
- Mike Abramson – bass, organ (1994–present)
- Dan McFarland – drums, percussion (1994–present)

Former

- Jay Smith – ocular noise machine, viditar (2001-2011)

== Discography ==
=== Studio albums ===
- The Strychnine (1996)
- Diatribe (1998)
- Sinch (2002)
- Clearing the Channel (2005)
- Hive Mind (2012)

=== Other releases ===
- Sinch (Demo) (1995)
- Project: Bluebird EP (2000)
- Imitating the Screen EP (2002)
- Live Cuts EP (2005)
- Subdivisions (EP) (2006)
