= Hive Mind (Sinch album) =

- Cover art

Studio album by Sinch
- Released: March 20, 2012
- Recorded: June 2009 – October 2011
- Genre: Rock
- Length: 61:17
- Label: Self-Distributed
- Producer: Rob Fisher, Sinch

Hive Mind is the third studio album by rock band Sinch, released on March 20, 2012.

== Background ==
At the start of 2009, Sinch started work on a fan-funded album, since they were no longer supported by a record label. They began recording in June of the same year, but due to the band members also holding down full-time jobs recording would take around 2 years to complete. By August 2011 the album was in the mixing stage and the release was being planned. The album finally saw the light of day as a digital download, available to those that contributed to the making of the album, on March 20, 2012, with a physical version planned to be available before the end of that month.

== Track listing ==
No.	Title	Length
1.	"Cause and Effect"	4:45
2.	"Targets on the Range"	4:14
3.	"Vessels"	3:36
4.	"Mapless"	4:41
5.	"State of Affairs"	3:06
6.	"Gods and Profits"	5:07
7.	"Easier Said Than Done"	4:30
8.	"Overmedication"	3:43
9.	"Speaking in Code"	5:39
10.	"Greenlight"	4:50
11.	"The Observer"	4:55
12.	"Jack's Heart"	3:39
13.	"Instructions (How to Die)"	4:48
14.	"We Are Still Alive"	3:44

== Personnel ==
Credits are adapted from the band's Bandcamp website.

Sinch

- Jamie Stem - vocals, lyrics
- Tony Lannutti - guitar, sound design
- Dan McFarland - drums
- Mike Abramson - bass

Credits

- Produced by Sinch and Rob Fisher (rfisheraudio.com)
- Recorded, mixed and engineered by Rob Fisher
- Additional production and engineering by John Fachet
- Additional production by Tony Lannutti
- Mix Consultant - Drew Mazurek (drewmazurek.com)
- Mastered by Drew Mazurek
- Recorded at Sweet Creek Studios (sweetcreekstudios.com)
- Artwork by Jónas Valtýsson (jonasval.com)
