= Seyoon Kim =

American theologian

- Born: 30 September 1946 (age 80); South Korea
- Title: Professor of New Testament at Fuller Theological Seminary

Academic background
- Education: University of Tübingen
- Alma mater: University of Manchester

Academic work
- Discipline: Biblical scholar

Korean name
- Hangul: 김세윤
- RR: Gim Seyun
- MR: Kim Seyun

Seyoon Kim (Korean: 김세윤; born 30 September 1946) is a biblical scholar, associate dean for the Korean Doctor of Ministry program and professor of New Testament at Fuller Theological Seminary.

== Biography ==
He was born in Chonbuk, South Korea, and was educated at the University of Tübingen and the University of Manchester. He specializes in Jesus studies, Pauline studies, New Testament Christology, Jesus and Paul. He studied with F. F. Bruce.

== Contribution ==
Seyoon Kim is best known for The Origin of Paul's Gospel, in which he argues that all of Paul's identity and theology come from his experience on the Damascus Road. For example, when Jesus said, "Saul, Saul, why do you persecute me?", the way Jesus identifies with his people leads to the idea of union with Christ.

== Selected works ==
=== Thesis ===
- Kim, Seyoon (1977). The Origin of Paul's Gospel (Ph.D.). Manchester: University of Manchester.

=== Books ===
- ——— (1981). The Origin of Paul's Gospel. Wissenschaftliche Untersuchungen zum Neuen Testament 2. Vol. 4. Tübingen: J.C.B. Mohr. ISBN 9783161420214. OCLC 7740523. - Revision of the author's 1977 Ph.D. thesis
- ——— (1981). Salvation in Christ. Seoul.
- ——— (1983). "The 'Son of Man'" as the Son of God. Wissenschaftliche Untersuchungen zum Neuen Testament. Vol. 30. Tübingen: Mohr. ISBN 9783161447051. OCLC 10468363.
- ——— (2000). The Lord's Prayer Expounded.
- ——— (2002). Paul and the New Perspective: Second Thoughts on the Origin of Paul's Gospel. Grand Rapids, MI: Eerdmans. ISBN 9780802849748. OCLC 47666615.
- ——— (2003). What is the Gospel?. Seoul: Tyrannus.
- ——— (2004). Women Created and Redeemed by God. Seoul: Tyrannus.
- ——— (2004). Philippians Expounded. Seoul: Tyrannus.
- ——— (2004). The Gospel of John Expounded. Seoul: Tyrannus.
- ——— (2007). 1 Corinthians Expounded. Seoul: Tyrannus.
- ——— (2008). Christ and Caesar: The Gospel and the Roman Empire in the Writings of Paul and Luke. Grand Rapids, MI: Eerdmans. ISBN 9780802860088. OCLC 488377998.
- ——— (2008). How Are We to Read the New Testament?. Seoul: Scripture Union.
- ———; Bruce, F. F. (2012). 1 & 2 Thessalonians. Word Biblical Commentary. Vol. 45. Thomas Nelson. ISBN 9780785250210. OCLC 939557583. - revision of the original by F. F. Bruce
