= Karl Ludwig Schmidt =

German Protestant theologian

Karl Schmidt
- Born: 5 February 1891; Frankfurt am Main, Kingdom of Prussia
- Died: 10 January 1956 (aged 64); Basel, Switzerland
- Occupation: Protestant theologian

Karl Ludwig Schmidt (5 February 1891 – 10 January 1956) was a German Protestant theologian and professor of New Testament studies at the University of Basel. He taught that the accounts of the New Testament were to be regarded as fixed written versions of oral Gospel tradition. In 1919, his book Der Rahmen der Geschichte Jesu ("The Framework of the Story of Jesus") showed that Mark's chronology is the invention of the evangelist. Using form criticism, Schmidt showed that an editor had assembled the narrative out of individual scenes that did not originally have a chronological order. This finding challenged historians' ability to discern a historical Jesus and helped bring about a decades-long collapse in interest in the topic.

He was professor of New Testament Studies from 1921 to 1925 in Giessen; 1925 to 1929 in Jena; from 1929 to 1933 in Bonn. He was dismissed from his position as a professor at Bonn in September 1933 by the Nazi regime due to his resistance to the Aryan paragraph. He was involved in church administration from 1933 to 1935 in Switzerland. From 1935 to 1953 he was a professor of New Testament in Basel. From 1922 to 1937 he was an editor of Theologische Blätter and from 1945 to 1953 he was an editor of Theologische Zeitschrift. He wrote the article on the meaning of the Greek word ekklesia (church) for the Theological Dictionary of the New Testament. In 1959, Karl Barth wrote this about him after his death: "K. L. Schmidt, far superior to me in both learning and pugnacity, but always so stimulating."

== Published works ==
- Schmidt, Karl Ludwig (1919). Der Rahmen der Geschichte Jesu: literarkritische Untersuchungen zur ältesten Jesusüberlieferung (in German). Trowitzsch.
  - Schmidt, Karl Ludwig (2021-04-14). The Framework of the Story of Jesus: Literary-Critical Investigations of the Earliest Jesus Tradition. Wipf and Stock Publishers. ISBN 978-1-5326-7557-7.
