= Sinch (album) =

Studio album by Sinch
- Released: July 30, 2002
- Genre: Alternative Metal
- Length: 48:50
- Label: Roadrunner
- Producer: Malcolm Springer

Sinch chronology
Diatribe (1998)	Sinch (2002)	Clearing the Channel (2005)

Professional ratings
Review scores
Source	Rating
AllMusic	3/5 stars

Sinch is the first major label release created by the American alternative metal group Sinch, which the band made shortly after being signed to Roadrunner Records.

Featuring a deliberately abrasive yet also melodic sound, the album notably includes "Something More", the band's first major single.

== Background and inspiration ==
The album was produced by Malcolm Springer. He had previously done producing work for bands such as Full Devil Jacket, Matchbox 20, and Collective Soul in the 2000s and late 1990s. Springer also contributed to the album in other ways such as making string arrangements and playing a Wurlitzer.

== Reviews and reception ==
Music critic Jason D. Taylor, writing for the Allmusic, gave the release a mixed to positive review. He argued, "Sinch experiments with hidden samples and awkward vocal tricks to keep the listener unprepared for the next leap into the unknown, and they do a satisfiable job at holding one's attention throughout the remainder of the album." He added that, while seeming "unfocused" and somewhat weak in certain areas, their alternative rock influenced sound can rise beyond contemporaries such as Creed and Default, particularly praising the single "Something More" as a "goldmine".

== Track listing ==
All tracks written and performed by Sinch.

No.	Title	Length
1.	"To Die in Fall"	4:14
2.	"433 (Hypothetical Situation)"	4:03
3.	"Tabula Rasa"	3:38
4.	"Something More"	3:45
5.	"Passive Resistor"	3:55
6.	"The Arctic Ocean"	3:52
7.	"Seven"	4:02
8.	"Plasma"	5:00
9.	"The Silent Acquiescence Of Millions"	8:44
10.	"Bitmap"	4:42
11.	"Armslength"	2:56

== See also ==
- 2002 in music
