= Jarrett (surname) =

The surname Jarrett is thought to be a variant of Garrett, from either of two Germanic personal names introduced to Britain by the Normans: Gerard, composed of the elements gar, ger 'spear', 'lance' + hard 'hardy', 'brave', 'strong'; and Gerald, composed of the elements gar, ger 'spear', 'lance' + wald 'rule'. Variants include Jarratt, Jarret and Jarrott.

Notable people with the names include:

== Notable people with the surname "Jarrett" include ==
=== A ===
- Aisling Jarrett-Gavin (born 1989/1990), English actress
- Albert Jarrett (born 1984), Sierra Leonean footballer
- Andrew Jarrett (born 1958), English tennis player
- Art Jarrett (1907–1987), American singer
- Arthur Jarrett (disambiguation), multiple people

=== B ===
- Beaumont Jarrett (1855–1905), English footballer
- Bede Jarrett (1881–1934), English priest
- Bella Jarrett (1926–2007), American actress and author
- Benjamin Jarrett (1881–1944), American politician
- Berrie H. Jarrett (1894–1927), American naval officer
- Bryan L. Jarrett, American attorney

=== C ===
- Clifford Jarrett (1909–1995), British civil servant
- Cole Jarrett (born 1983), Canadian ice hockey player
- Craig Jarrett (born 1979), American football player

=== D ===
- Dale Jarrett (born 1956), American auto racing driver
- Daniel Jarrett (1886–1938), American screenwriter
- David Jarrett (born 1952), English teacher
- Derek Jarrett (1928–2004), English historian and author
- Doug Jarrett (1944–2014), Canadian ice hockey player
- Dwayne Jarrett (born 1986), American football player

=== F ===
- Fred Jarrett, American politician

=== G ===
- Gary Jarrett (born 1942), Canadian ice hockey player
- Gene Andrew Jarrett (born 1975), American professor
- Geoffrey Jarrett (born 1937), Australian bishop
- Glenn Jarrett (born 1950), American auto racing driver
- Grady Jarrett (born 1993), American football player
- Graham Jarrett (1937–2004), English cricketer
- Greg Jarrett (radio personality) (born 1952), American radio host
- Gregg Jarrett (born 1955), American news commentator

=== H ===
- Hal Jarrett (1907–1983), South African cricketer
- Hanson Jarrett (1837–1890), English soldier
- Harry B. Jarrett (1898–1974), American admiral
- H. Marshall Jarrett (born 1945), American lawyer

=== I ===
- Ilisha Jarrett (born 1977), American basketball player

=== J ===
- Jaiquawn Jarrett (born 1989), American football player
- James H. Jarrett (1832–1922), American politician and physician
- James Henry Jarrett (1895–1943), British colonial administrator
- Jason Jarrett (disambiguation), multiple people
- Jeff Jarrett (born 1967), American professional wrestler
- Jeffrey D. Jarrett, American politician
- Jerry Jarrett (1942–2023), American professional wrestler and promoter
- Jim Jarrett (1937–2025), American athletic administrator
- John Jarrett (born 1970), American skier
- Jovanee Jarrett (born 1983), Jamaican long jumper

=== K ===
- Karen Jarrett (born 1972), American professional wrestling manager
- Keith Jarrett (born 1945), American pianist and composer
- Keith Jarrett (rugby) (born 1948), Welsh rugby union footballer
- Kemar Jarrett (born 1982), Jamaican criminal
- Kyshoen Jarrett (born 1993), American football player

=== L ===
- Laureen Jarrett (born 1938), Canadian teacher
- Len Jarrett (1921–2017), English civil servant
- Link Jarrett (born 1972), American baseball coach
- Luther M. Jarrett (1804–1854), American politician

=== M ===
- Madonna Jarrett, Australian politician
- Major Jarrett (??–1839), Jamaican criminal
- Marilyn Jarrett (1939–2006), American businesswoman and politician
- Martin L. Jarrett (1841–1920), American politician and physician
- Martyn Jarrett (born 1944), English bishop
- Mary Cromwell Jarrett (1877–1961), American social worker
- Michael Jarrett (cricketer) (born 1972), English doctor and cricketer
- Michael Jarrett (archaeologist) (1934–1994), British archaeologist

=== N ===
- Ned Jarrett (1932–2026), American auto racing driver

=== P ===
- Patrick Jarrett (born 1972), Jamaican sprinter
- Paul Jarrett (born 1981), American entrepreneur
- Philip Jarrett, English author and aviation historian

=== R ===
- Rakim Jarrett (born 2001), American football player
- Rebecca Jarrett (1846–1928), British activist
- Red Jarrett (1907–1962), American football player
- Renne Jarrett (born 1946), American actress
- Rianna Jarrett (born 1994), Irish footballer
- Richard Jarrett (1870–??), Welsh footballer
- Ryan Jarrett (born 1983), American cowboy

=== S ===
- Sean Jarrett (born 1984), American baseball player
- Stanford Jarrett (born 1977), Montserratian footballer

=== T ===
- Ted Jarrett (1925–2009), American singer-songwriter
- Thelma Eileen Jarrett (1905–1987), Australian volunteer
- Thomas Jarrett (1805–1882), English religious figure
- T. J. Jarrett, American writer
- Todd Jarrett, American competitive shooter
- Tony Jarrett (born 1968), English sprinter
- Tristan Jarrett (born 1998), American basketball player
- Tyrique Jarrett (born 1994), American football player

=== V ===
- Valerie Jarrett (born 1956), American businesswoman
- Vernon Jarrett (1918–2004), American journalist

=== W ===
- Wayne Jarrett (born 1956), Jamaican musician
- William Jarrett (disambiguation), multiple people
- Winston Jarrett (born 1940), Jamaican singer

== Jarratt ==
- Alex Jarratt (1924–2019), British businessman
- George Jarratt (1891–1917), English soldier
- Grahame Jarratt (1929–2011), New Zealand rower
- Jan Jarratt (born 1958), Australian politician
- John Jarratt (born 1951), Australian actor
- Melynda Jarratt (born 1961), Canadian historian
- Steve Jarratt, British journalist
- Susan Jarratt, American professor
- Wayne Jarratt (1957–1988), Australian actor

== Jarret ==
- Gabriel Jarret (born 1970), American actor

== Jarrott ==
- Alan Jarrott (born 1956), Australian rules footballer
- Charles Jarrott (1927–2011), English film director
- Charles Jarrott (racing driver) (1877–1944), English racing driver

== Fictional characters ==
- Melissa Jarrett, a fictional character in the soap opera Neighbours

== See also ==
- Jarrett (given name), a page for people with the given name "Jarrett"
- Jarrett (disambiguation), a disambiguation page for "Jarrett"
