= Jaret =

Jaret is a given name. Notable people with the name include:

- Jaret Anderson-Dolan (born 1999), Canadian ice hockey player
- Jaret Gibbons (born 1980), American politician
- Jaret Holmes (born 1976), American football player
- Jaret Patterson (born 1999), American football player
- Jaret Wright (born 1975), American baseball player

== See also ==
- Jarett
- Jarret (disambiguation)
- Jarrett (disambiguation)
