= Jarrett (given name) =

Origin
- Origin: Old English

Other names
- Related names: Jared, Garrett, Jarret

The given name Jarrett is a variant of the name Gerard, and has an English origin meaning Spear Brave.

== Notable people with the given names "Jarrett" or "Jarret" include ==
- Jarrett Allen (born 1998), American basketball player
- Jarrett Barrios (born 1968), American politician
- Jarrett Bellini (born 1978), American writer
- Jarrett Boykin (born 1989), American football player
- Jarret Brachman, American policy advisor
- Jarrett Brown (born 1987), American football player
- Jarrett Burton (born 1990), Canadian ice hockey player
- Jarrett Bush (born 1984), American football player
- Jarrett Byers (born 1985), American football player
- Jarrett Campbell, Canadian comedian
- Jarrett Coleman (born 1990), American politician
- Jarrett Culver (born 1999), American basketball player
- Jarret DeHart (born 1994), American baseball coach
- Jarrett Deuling (born 1974), Canadian ice hockey player
- Jarrett Durham (born 1949), American basketball player
- Jarret Eaton (born 1989), American track athlete
- Jarrett Guarantano (born 1997), American football player
- Jarrett Grube (born 1981), American baseball player
- Jarrett Hart (born 1980), British basketball player
- Jarrett Hicks (born 1984), American football player
- Jarrett Hoffpauir (born 1983), American baseball player
- Jarrett Hurd (born 1990), American boxer
- Jarrett Irons, American football player
- Jarrett Jack (born 1983), American basketball player
- Jarret Johnson (born 1981), American football player
- Jarrrett Kaplan (born 1997), American-Israeli basketball player
- Jarrett Keohokalole (born 1983), American politician
- Jarrett Kingston (born 1999), American football player
- Jarrett J. Krosoczka (born 1977), American author
- Jarrett Lee (born 1989), American football player
- Jarrett Maier (born 1998), American actor
- Jarret Myer (born 1973), American entrepreneur
- Jarrett Parker (born 1989), American baseball player
- Jaret Patterson (born 1999), American football player
- Jarrett Patterson (born 1999), American football player
- Jarrett Payton (born 1980), American football player
- Jarrett Perry, American para-swimmer
- Jarrett Rivers (born 1993), English footballer
- Jarrett Schaefer (born 1979), American film director
- Jarrett Stidham (born 1996), American football player
- Jarret Stoll (born 1982), Canadian ice hockey player
- Jarrett Subloo (born 2000), Australian rugby league footballer
- Jarret Thomas (born 1981), American snowboarder
- Jarrett Walker (born 1962), American transit consultant
- Jarrett Williams (born 1984), American comic book writer
- Jarret Zukiwsky (born 1972), Canadian ice hockey player

== See also ==
- Jarrett (disambiguation), a disambiguation page for "Jarrett"
- Jarrett (surname), a page for people with the surname "Jarrett"
