= ROFLMAO =

ROFLMAO may refer to:

- Internet slang (Rolling On the Floor Laughing My Ass Off) related to LOL
- ROFLMAO productions, producer of the mockumentary Pure Pwnage
