= Jarett =

Jarett is a given name. Notable people with the name include:

- Jarett Andretti (born 1992), an American racing driver from Charlotte, North Carolina
- Jarett Cale, plays Jeremy in Pure Pwnage, an Internet-distributed, mockumentary series
- Jarett Dillard (born 1985), American football wide receiver for the Jacksonville Jaguars
- Jarett Gandolfo, American politician
- Jarett Park (born 1982), professional lacrosse player from Otisco, New York

== See also ==
- Charette (disambiguation)
- Charrette
- Garett
- Garrett (disambiguation)
- Jarrett (disambiguation)
