= Northeastern State RiverHawks =

- University: Northeastern State University
- Nickname: RiverHawks
- NCAA: Division II
- Conference: The MIAA
- Athletic director: John Sisemore
- Location: Tahlequah, Oklahoma
- Varsity teams: 14
- Football stadium: Doc Wadley Stadium
- Basketball arena: NSU Event Center
- Colors: Green and white
- Mascot: Rowdy the RiverHawk
- Fight song: "Northeastern, Northeastern"
- Website: goriverhawksgo.com
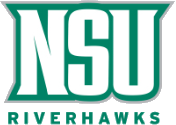

The Northeastern State RiverHawks are the athletic teams that represent Northeastern State University, located in Tahlequah, Oklahoma, in intercollegiate sports as a member of the Division II ranks of the National Collegiate Athletic Association (NCAA), primarily competing in the Mid-America Intercollegiate Athletics Association (MIAA) for most of its sports since the 2012–13 academic year; while its men's soccer team competes in the Great American Conference (GAC). The RiverHawks previously competed as an NCAA D-II Independent during the 2011–12 school year; in the D-II Lone Star Conference (LSC) from 1997–98 to 2010–11; and in the Oklahoma Intercollegiate Conference (OIC) of the National Association of Intercollegiate Athletics (NAIA) from 1974–75 to 1996–97.

== Name change ==
Northeastern State University announced on May 23, 2006, that it would be dropping "Redmen" and selecting a new mascot. The change was made proactively in response to the 2005 NCAA Native American mascot decision. The university announced its new athletic name as the RiverHawks on November 14, 2006.

== Varsity teams ==
NSU competes in 14 intercollegiate sports: Men's sports include baseball, basketball, football, golf, soccer, tennis, and wrestling; while women's sports include basketball, golf, soccer, softball, tennis, volleyball, and wrestling.

Men's sports	Women's sports
Baseball	Basketball
Basketball	Golf
Football	Soccer
Golf	Softball
Soccer	Tennis
Tennis	Volleyball
Wrestling	Wrestling

On June 30, 2025, NSU announced it would add seven varsity teams over the next two years. Men's and women's wrestling, along with volleyball, will debut as varsity sports in the 2026–27 academic year, and men's and women's indoor and outdoor track and field, as well as men's and women's cross country, will be added for the 2027–28 academic year. On June 25, 2026, it was announced a varsity rodeo program will, pending approval, begin intercollegiate competition in 2027. Previously, in March 2025, NSU announced the revival of the men's tennis program following a 24-year absence, which started competition in the 2025 fall season. In total, NSU will add 11 additional programs eligible for national championship opportunities for student-athletes.

=== Men's basketball ===
In 2003, the men's basketball team won the NCAA Division II National Championship, beating Kentucky Wesleyan 75–64.

== Spirit Squads ==
The university also offers participation in spirit squads at athletic and other school sponsored events.

- Pom Squad
- Cheerleading

=== Cheerleading ===
The Squad last competed in National Cheerleaders Association collegiate nationals in 2013, placing 3rd in the Intermediate Coed Division II category.

=== Pom Squad ===
The Northeastern State University pom squad is currently coached by Lauren Perez.

== Notable alumni ==
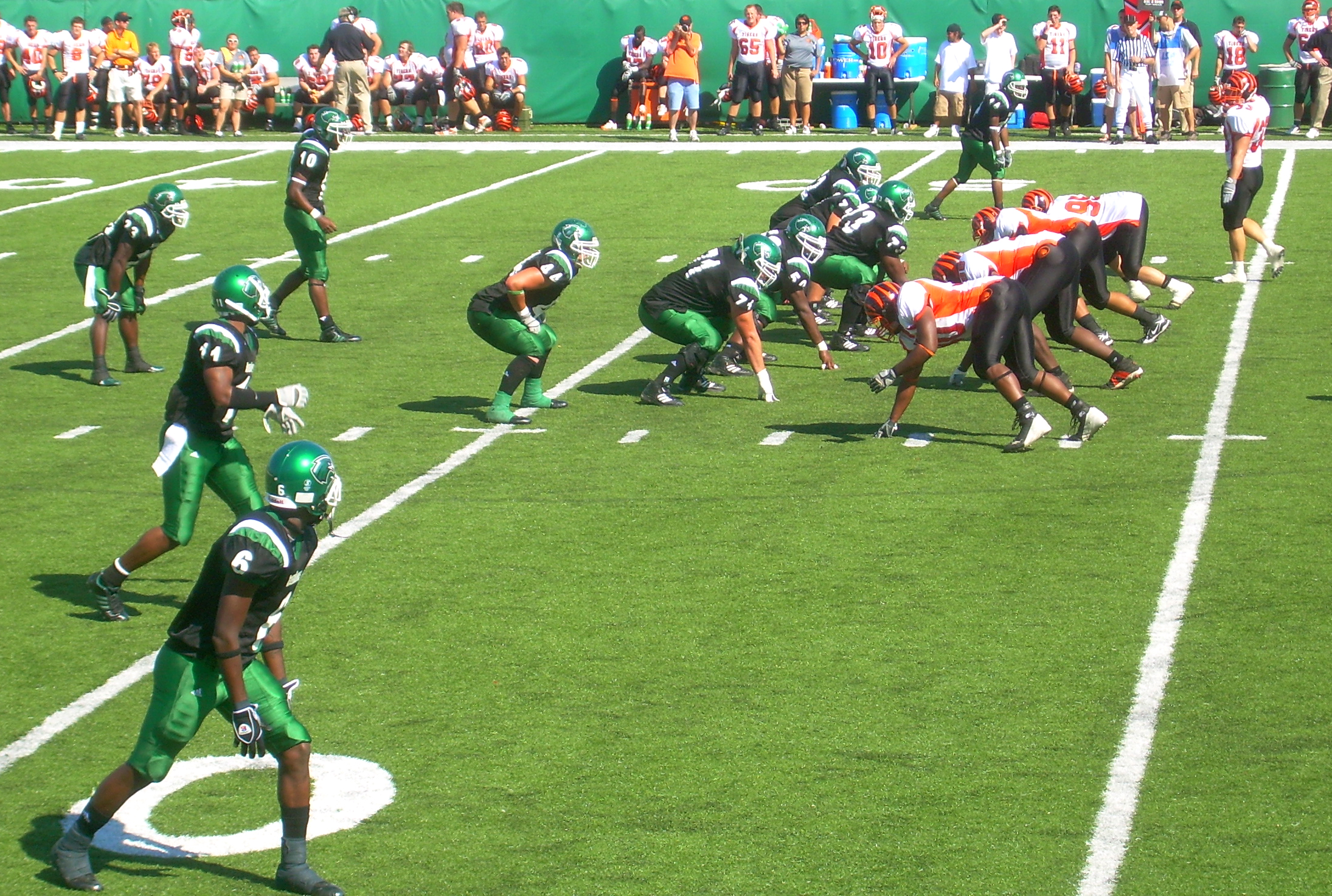
NSU's 2007 Homecoming Game

- Carrie Underwood, American Idol winner and country music singer
- Billy Bock, late baseball coach for four high schools winning nine state titles
- Jarrett Byers, former St. Louis Rams wide receiver
- Larry Coker, former head coach at the University of Miami
- Bob Hudson, former NFL player
- Ronnie Jones, American football coach
- Derrick Moore, former NFL player
- Ryan Helsley, All-Star relief pitcher for the St. Louis Cardinals
