= Stanford Jarrett =

Montserratian footballer

Personal information
- Date of birth: 9 August 1977 (age 49)
- Position: Midfielder

International career^{‡}
Years	Team	Apps	(Gls)
2010–	Montserrat	3	(0)
- ‡ National team caps and goals as of 26 June 2011

Stanford Jarrett (born 9 August 1977) is a Montserratian international footballer who plays as a midfielder.

== Career ==
Jarrett made his international debut for Montserrat on 6 October 2010. He has three caps to date.
