= Derek Jarrett =

English schoolteacher, historian, and writer

John Derek Jarrett (18 March 1928 – 28 March 2004) was an English schoolteacher, historian, and writer. He was born at Whyteleafe, Surrey and served in the RAF during World War II before studying history at Keble College, Oxford. He is best known for his edition of Horace Walpole's Memoirs of the Reign of King George III, and perhaps for his sometimes acerbic reviews in the New York Review of Books.

Jarrett taught at Sherborne School in Dorset until the mid-1960s, then at Goldsmiths College of the University of London for the remainder of his academic career. Around 1990 he retired to Cornwall to complete work on his Walpole masterpiece, which was published in 1999. He died at Truro in Cornwall.

== Works ==
- Britain 1688–1815 (1965)
- The Begetters of Revolution: England's Involvement with France, 1759–1789 (1973)
- Pitt the Younger (1974)
- The Ingenious Mr. Hogarth (1976)
- England in the Age of Hogarth (1976)
- The Sleep of Reason: Fantasy and Reality from the Victorian Age to the First World War (1988).
- Horace Walpole's Memoirs of the Reign of King George III, 4 volumes, editor (1999)
