= USS Jarrett =

American guided missile frigate

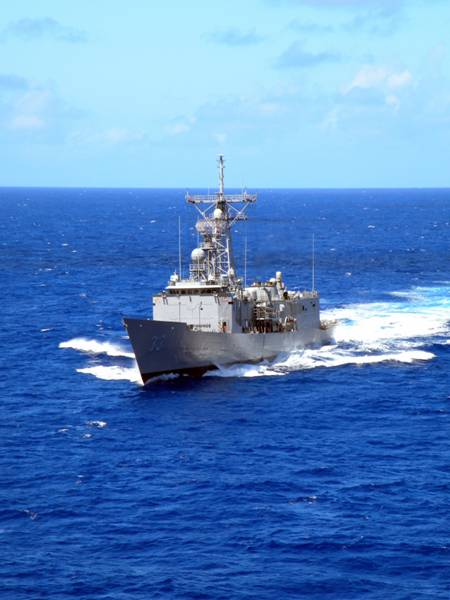
- USS Jarrett (FFG-33)

History

United States
- Name: Jarrett
- Namesake: Vice Admiral Harry B. Jarrett
- Ordered: 23 January 1978
- Builder: Todd Pacific Shipyards, Los Angeles Division, San Pedro, California
- Laid down: 11 February 1981
- Launched: 17 October 1981
- Sponsored by: Mrs. Mary W. D. Jarrett, widow of the late Vice Adm. Jarrett
- Acquired: 27 May 1983
- Commissioned: 2 July 1983
- Decommissioned: 26 May 2011
- Stricken: 26 May 2011
- Home port: Naval Base San Diego
- Identification: Hull symbol:FFG-33; Code letters:NRCD
- Motto: Valens Et Egregius; (Able and Excellent)
- Fate: Arrived under tow for scrapping at Sulphur, Louisiana 18 June 2015,
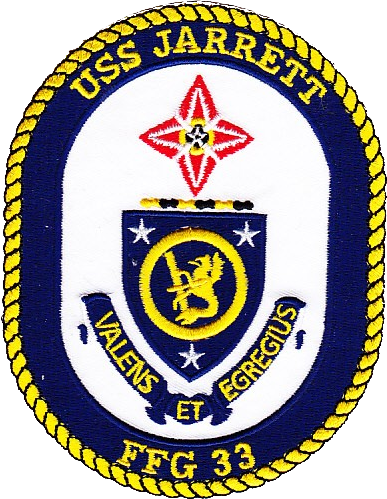
- Badge

General characteristics
- Class & type: Oliver Hazard Perry-class frigate
- Displacement: 4,100 long tons (4,200 t), full load
- Length: 453 feet (138 m), overall
- Beam: 45 feet (14 m)
- Draught: 22 feet (6.7 m)
- Propulsion: 2 × General Electric LM2500-30 gas turbines generating 41,000 shp (31 MW) through a single shaft and variable pitch propeller; 2 × Auxiliary Propulsion Units, 350 hp (260 kW) retractable electric azimuth thrusters for maneuvering and docking.
- Speed: over 29 knots (54 km/h)
- Range: 5,000 nautical miles at 18 knots (9,300 km at 33 km/h)
- Complement: 15 officers and 190 enlisted, plus SH-60 LAMPS detachment of roughly six officer pilots and 15 enlisted maintainers
- Sensors & processing systems: AN/SPS-49 air-search radar; AN/SPS-55 surface-search radar; CAS and STIR fire-control radar; AN/SQS-56 sonar.
- Electronic warfare & decoys: AN/SLQ-32
- Armament: As built: 1 × OTO Melara Mk 75 76 mm/62 caliber naval gun; 2 × Mk 32 triple-tube (324 mm) launchers for Mark 46 torpedoes; 1 × Vulcan Phalanx CIWS; 4 × .50-cal (12.7 mm) machine guns.; 1 × Mk 13 Mod 4 single-arm launcher for Harpoon anti-ship missiles and SM-1MR Standard anti-ship/air missiles (40 round magazine); Note: As of 2004, Mk 13 systems removed from all active US vessels of this class.
- Aircraft carried: 2 × SH-60 LAMPS III helicopters

USS Jarrett (FFG-33), was the twenty-fifth ship of the Oliver Hazard Perry-class guided missile frigates, was named for Vice Admiral Harry B. Jarrett (1898–1974).

Ordered from Todd Pacific Shipyards, Los Angeles Division, San Pedro, California on 23 January 1978 as part of the FY78 program, Jarrett was laid down on 11 February 1981, launched on 17 October 1981, commissioned on 2 July 1983, and decommissioned on 21 April 2011.

Jarrett was the first US Navy warship to be commanded by a woman, Commander Kathleen A. McGrath, from 18 December 1998 until 4 September 2000.

== Service history ==
=== 12 May – 12 November 1987 ===
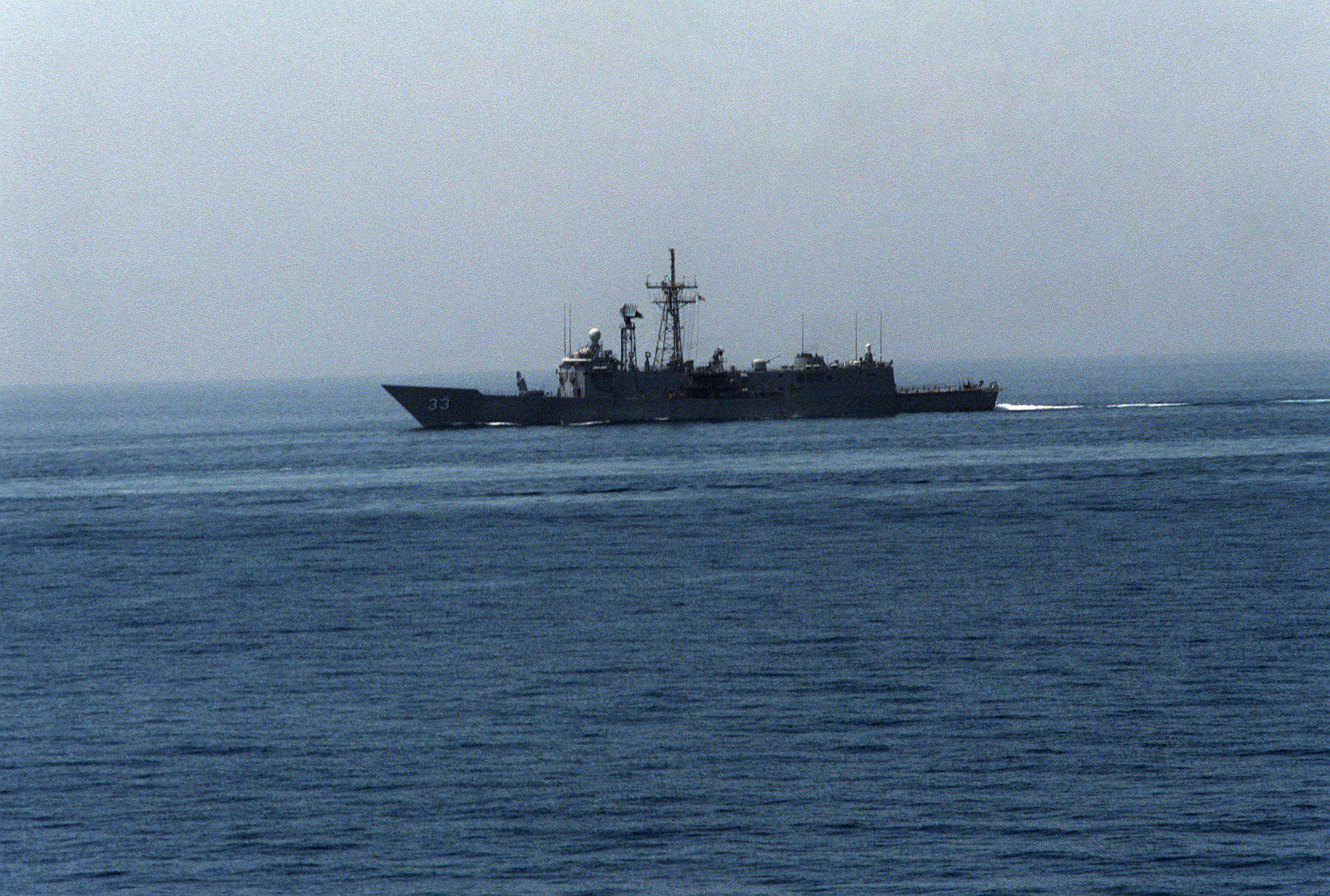
Jarett during her deployment to the Persian Gulf, 8 August 1987.

During a deployment to the Western Pacific, Indian Ocean, and Persian Gulf Jarrett took part in Operation Earnest Will, an operation to maintain freedom of navigation within the Persian Gulf, that included renaming and reflagging 11 Kuwaiti tankers.

In the "Tanker War" between the Iranians and Iraqis, the Iranians utilized 1,662 ton former South Korean roll-on, roll-off vessel Iran Ajr to lay mines to cut the sea lanes to Iraq. Iran Ajr stopped overnight on 21 September 1987, at a two-towered rig named Rashadat in the Rastam gas-oil separation platform (GOSP) complex, 120 miles east of Bahrain. The rig had been shut down for almost two years following Iraqi discovery that the Iranians used Rashadat for radar tracking of ships and for launching small boats. Iran Ajr turned toward the tanker routes, but just before midnight three Army helicopters, consisting of a Boeing MH-6 "Little Bird" and a pair of AH-6 "Sea Bats" of the 160th Special Operations Aviation Regiment (Airborne), at least one of the helos flew from Jarrett, surprised the minelayer 50 miles northeast of Bahrain.

President Ronald W. Reagan later announced that Iran Ajr posed "a direct threat to the safety of U.S. warships and other U.S.-flag vessels." The Iranian ship began to lay mines in an area where Middle East Force (MEF) flagship La Salle sailed, and when reporters afterwards queried Rear Admiral Harold J. Bernsen, Commander MEF, about the Iranians' intent to sink the flagship he replied, "Absolutely." At 2302 therefore, the Army helos announced "inbound hot" and attacked the Iranian ship into the mid-watch, damaging her with 2.75 in (70 mm) rockets and 7.62 mm (0.30 in) M134 Minigun fire, and killing at least four crewmen.

La Salle, amphibious assault ship Guadalcanal, guided-missile cruisers Reeves and William H. Standley, guided-missile destroyer Kidd, and guided-missile frigates Flatley and Jarrett made for the area. Men of Sea, Air, Land (SEAL) Team 2 backed-up by two Marine helos, boarded and captured the ship from a landing craft during the morning watch. The boarders gathered 24 survivors on board or from the water (one later died), impounded the minelayer, photographed evidence, and located at least nine remaining mines. The prisoners were later returned to Iran.

=== 7 December 1990 – 6 June 1991 ===
During a deployment to the Western Pacific, Indian Ocean, and Persian Gulf, Jarrett, with two Sikorsky SH-60B Seahawks of Helicopter Antisubmarine Squadron (Light) (HSL)-45 Detachment 2 embarked took part in the Persian Gulf War I. During the coalition air attacks in Operation Desert Storm, many Iraqi jets fled to Iran. Following Jarrett's arrival in the Persian Gulf on 25 January 1991, she consequently operated as an antiair picket off the Iranian coast (3–11 February).

The ship then embarked two Army Bell OH-58D "Kiowas" and 13 soldiers of B Troop, 4th Squadron, 17th Cavalry Regiment (Air) (Reconnaissance), 18th Aviation Brigade (Corps) (Airborne). On 16 February 1991, the "Kiowas" flew a night coastal reconnaissance flight, and Jarrett re-directed them approximately 40 miles north to assess bomb damage on an Iraqi HY-2G "Silkworm" (CSS-C-2 Sea Eagle-2) surface-to-surface missile site. Navy Grumman A-6E "Intruders" bombed the site, but the helos discovered that the "Intruders" failed to destroy the Silkworms, and carrier jets bombed them again.

The two helicopters refueled on board Jarrett and lifted off, equipped with AGM-114 Hellfire air-to-ground missiles. Battleship Missouri operated an AAI RQ-2 Pioneer remotely piloted vehicle (RPV) subsequently designated an unmanned aerial vehicle (UAV) that helped the battleship direct her naval gunfire support of the troops fighting ashore. Crewmen launched the Pioneer with the assistance of a rocket-powered booster and recovered the aircraft by utilizing a net strung between two cables on the fantail. The vehicle transmitted images to shipboard TV monitors that enabled men to "walk" rounds onto their targets. The Pioneer revealed that at least one Iraqi missile survived the second bombing, and one of the "Kiowas" launched a Hellfire that destroyed the Silkworm.

Jarrett passed through areas swept clear of mines off the Kuwaiti coast and joined British destroyer Gloucester and frigate London while they protected Missouri as the battleship shelled enemy troops ashore. An Iraqi battery at al-Finţās fired two Silkworms at the formation of allied ships, at 0452 on 25 February 1991. One of the Silkworms misfired and crashed into the sea shortly after the Iraqis launched it, but the other missile hurtled toward Missouri at 605 knots and a height of 375 feet above the water. The U.S. and British ships tracked the incoming missile on their radar. From the bridge of the Jarrett, Lt. Craig Isaacson ordered chaff, torchs, and decoys to be launched to confound the missile's guidance. Missouri also fired its SRBOC chaff at this time. The Phalanx CIWS system on Jarrett, operating in the automatic target-acquisition mode, fixed on Missouri's chaff, releasing a burst of rounds. From this burst, four rounds hit Missouri which was 2–3 miles (3.2–4.8 km) from Jarrett at the time. There were no injuries. Gloucester shot down the missile with two Sea Dart surface-to-air missiles.

Later, Missouri launched a Pioneer RPV that discovered the Iraqi Silkworm battery and the battleship fired 30 16-inch rounds and knocked out the battery. After the cease-fire, Jarrett escorted merchant ships through "mine danger areas" (1 March–14 April).

=== 31 January 2000 ===
Alaska Airlines Flight 261, a McDonnell Douglas MD-83 airliner, crashed into the Pacific north of Anacapa Island, California, killing all 88 people on board, on 31 January 2000. A Lockheed NP-3D Orion from Point Mugu, California, two Sikorsky HH-60H Seahawks from Helicopter Sea Combat Squadron (HCS) 5 from Point Mugu, and Coast Guard helos and a Lockheed HC-130H Hercules responded. Aircraft carrier Abraham Lincoln supported rescue crews, and Navy mapping with underwater side scanning sonar and video enabled the searchers to recover pieces of wreckage. Reinforcements included amphibious transport dock Cleveland, destroyer Fife and Jarrett, these ships embarked HH-60 and SH-60 Seahawks, and a Lockheed S-3B Viking from Naval Air Station North Island.

The ship may have been assigned to a Destroyer squadron that formed part of Carrier Strike Group Three after 2004.

=== 11 May–19 October 2009 ===
The ship, with HSL-49 Detachment 3 and Pacific Tactical Law Enforcement Detachment 101 embarked (followed by 107), sailed on a counter-narcotics deployment to the Eastern Pacific. Her operations resulted in the seizure or disruption of the smuggling of over nine tons of narcotics with an estimated street value of $266 million.

== Fate ==
On 21 April 2011, Jarrett was decommissioned at Naval Base San Diego after 15 deployments, and was transported to the Puget Sound Naval Shipyard as its final destination, becoming part of the Mothball Fleet. The ship's most recent deployment was a six-month counter-illicit trafficking deployment, supporting U.S. Naval Forces Southern Command. In 2015, this ship was scrapped.

Jarrett was the first ship of that name in the US Navy.
