= Kemar Jarrett =

Jamaican criminal

Kemar "Natty Patch" Jarrett
- Born: 1982 (age 43–44)
- Other name: Craig Orlando Kelly
- Occupation: Yardie gang member
- Status: Imprisoned
- Penalty: deported from the United Kingdom

Kemar "Natty Patch" Jarrett (born 1982) is a gang member of the Yardies who, in 2002, was listed by the Jamaica Constabulary Force as the number one criminal on the top ten most wanted list of criminals in the country before fleeing to the United Kingdom. He was one of six most wanted by the Jamaica Constabulary Force to take up residence in the UK, Jarrett being one of an estimated 500 Jamaican Yardies living in the country according to the Jamaican authorities.

== Disappearance and capture ==
He was listed at number three the following year, behind Joel Andem and Donnovan "Bulbie" Bennett until his capture immediately after he landing at the Norman Manley International Airport in Kingston on 18 February 2004 after being deported from the United Kingdom on drug related charges. Taken into custody by special branch detectives, Jarrett was charged with three counts of murder during 2001, on 6 June, 31 July and 16 December, as well as weapons charges. He was also wanted on additional charges including murder, assault and rape.

== See also ==
- List of fugitives from justice who disappeared
