= Harry B. Jarrett =

United States Navy Vice admiral

Harry Bean Jarrett
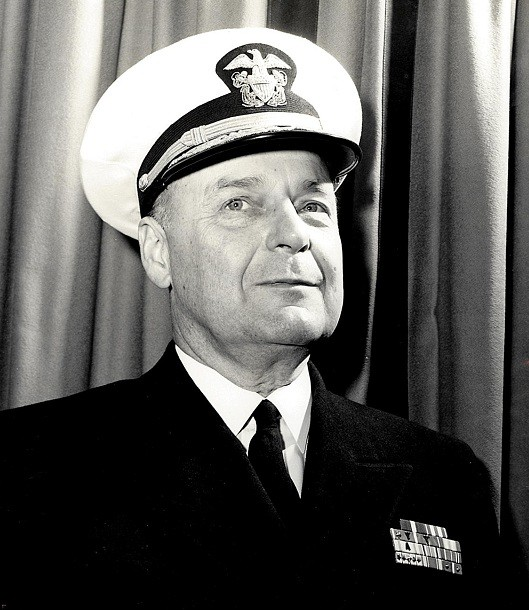
- RADM Harry B. Jarrett, USN
- Born: 12 October 1898; Valley Forge, Pennsylvania, US
- Died: 9 April 1974 (aged 75); San Diego, California, US
- Burial place: United States Naval Academy Cemetery
- Military career
- Allegiance: United States
- Branch: United States Navy
- Service years: 1922–1954
- Rank: Vice Admiral
- Service number: 57619
- Commands: Cruiser Division 4 Destroyer Flotilla 4 USS Astoria; Destroyer Squadron 53; USS Morris
- Conflicts: World War I World War II: Battle of the Coral Sea; Battle of Midway; Battle of Kwajalein; Battle of Saipan; Battle of Tinian; Battle of Guam; Battle of Leyte Gulf; Battle of Okinawa
- Awards: Navy Cross; Silver Star; Legion of Merit (2); Bronze Star Medal

Harry Bean Jarrett (12 October 1898 – 9 April 1974) was a highly decorated officer in the United States Navy with the rank of vice admiral. A veteran of several campaigns in Pacific during World War II, he distinguished himself during the Battle of the Coral Sea in May 1942, while commanding destroyer Morris and received the Navy Cross, the second highest decoration of the United States military.

Jarrett rose to the admiral's rank following the war and held several important assignments including commander, Cruiser Division 4; Commander, Destroyer Flotilla 4; and as the first U.S. Senior Military Attaché, Formosa (Taiwan). He retired in November 1954, while serving as Deputy Naval Inspector General. He was the namesake of Guided missile frigate USS Jarrett (FFG-33).

== Early career ==
Harry Bean Jarrett was born on 12 October 1898 in Valley Forge, Pennsylvania, the son of merchant Winfield Scott and May Rowan Jarrett. He completed Valley Forge Grammar School and entered the Phoenixville High School, both in Pennsylvania and upon graduation, he attended the Wilmer and Chew Preparatory School in Washington, D.C. Jarrett was able to secure an appointed to the United States Naval Academy at Annapolis, Maryland, by Representative Edward Cooper and entered the academy in summer 1918. While at the academy, he was active in baseball and soccer, and was a member of the Hop Committee, organizing the regimental hops (dances) and June Ball.

Jarrett graduated with Bachelor of Science degree on 2 June 1922 and was commissioned ensign on that date. He was then assigned to heavy cruiser Rochester, which served as flagship of commander, Destroyer Squadrons, Atlantic Fleet under Rear Admiral Ashley H. Robertson. Jarrett took part in a six-month voyage along the Honduran coast during a revolution that imperiled Americans in that country in early 1923.

In January 1925, Jarrett was ordered to the Naval Submarine Base New London, Connecticut, for submarine instruction, which he completed in June that year. He was subsequently promoted to Lieutenant (junior grade) and ordered to Pearl Harbor, Hawaii, where he joined the submarine R-19 as her Engineer officer. Following a one year of patrols in the Pacific Ocean, Jarrett was ordered back to the United States Naval Academy at Annapolis, Maryland, and entered the instruction in diesel engineering at the Naval Postgraduate School there.

Upon graduation one year later, Jarrett was ordered to the Columbia University in New York City, where he earned Master's degree in engineering in October 1929. He was then sent to the Portsmouth Naval Shipyard, New Hampshire, for duty in connection with fitting out of new V-boat submarine Narwhal. Jarrett served as ship's engineer officer under lieutenant commander John H. Brown Jr. and participated in the sea trials off the Boon Island in Gulf of Maine. His ship dived to 332 Feet and remained there for 45 minutes, breaking the Navy record for depth. Jarrett was promoted to lieutenant on 5 March 1930.

In June 1932, Jarrett was appointed engineer and repair officer of the Submarine Base at Coco Solo, Panama Canal Zone. He remained in Panama until October 1934, when he was given command of submarine S-14, which he took for decommissioning to Philadelphia Navy Yard. Jarrett was then assigned to the heavy cruiser Northampton as Assistant engineer under Captain Harry E. Shoemaker, participating in the naval exercises off the coast of Hawaii.

Jarrett was ordered to United States Naval Academy at Annapolis, Maryland, in June 1937 and assumed duty as a discipline officer on the staff of Superintendent, Rear admiral David F. Sellers. While in that capacity, he also took part in a midshipman cruise on board battleship New York to European waters during the summer of 1938. During his service at the academy, Jarrett was promoted to lieutenant commander on 23 June 1938 and also completed correspondence course in international law at the Naval War College in Newport, Rhode Island.

== World War II ==
=== Coral Sea and Midway ===
In December 1939, Jarrett was ordered to the Norfolk Navy Yard for duty in connection with fitting out of destroyer Morris. The ship was commissioned on 5 March 1940 and he assumed her command. Morris was designated the flagship of Destroyer Squadron 2 under Captain Walden L. Ainsworth, participating in the neutrality patrols with the Atlantic Fleet. At the time of Japanese attack on Pearl Harbor and the United States entry into World War II, Jarrett's Morris was still located in the Atlantic. He immediately received orders to sail for Pearl Harbor, Hawaii, to join Task Force 17 under vice admiral Frank J. Fletcher and was promoted to the temporary rank of commander on 1 January 1942.

Following the Japanese capture of Tulagi in the Solomon Islands on 3 May 1942, Fletcher's task force was ordered to intercept Japanese ships sent to capture Port Moresby on New Guinea. Jarrett's ship served as a screen for aircraft carriers Yorktown and Lexington and participated in the engagement with Imperial Japanese Navy ships in the Coral Sea on 4–8 May 1942. The aircraft carrier Lexington was badly damaged by enemy bombs and torpedoes on 8 May and after several explosions inside the hull, it began sinking. In constant danger of subsequent attacks by enemy Japanese aircraft, Jarrett placed his ship alongside the stricken aircraft carrier and took aboard over 500 survivors of its crew.

Morris then embarked for Hawaii for repair of damage sustained in the Coral Sea and returned to Southwest Pacific one month later. Jarrett led Morris during the Battle of Midway on 4–7 June 1942 and following the sinking of Yorktown, he rescued over 500 of her survivors. For his service in the Coral Sea, he was decorated with the Navy Cross, the second highest decoration of the United States military.

=== Late service in Pacific ===
Jarrett returned to the United States by the end of June that year and assumed duty as a discipline officer on the staff of Superintendent of the United States Naval Academy at Annapolis, Maryland, Rear admiral John R. Beardall. While in this capacity, he was promoted to the temporary rank of captain on 1 April 1943.

He was transferred back to Southwest Pacific area in December 1943 and assumed command of Destroyer Squadron 53, consisting of destroyers Colahan, Murray, and Harrison. His unit screened battleships New Mexico and Mississippi during the bombardment of Enubuj and Kwajalein Islands on 31 January 1944 and also covered transports carrying invasion forces to Eniwetok, in the Marshall Islands. For his service during the campaign, Jarrett was decorated with the Legion of Merit with Combat "V".

Jarrett later served as destroyer screen commander for convoy escort and shore bombardment during the Mariana Islands campaign, participating in the assaults on Saipan, Tinian, and Guam in June–August 1944 and received a Gold star in lieu of second Legion of Merit with Combat "V" for distinguished service.

In September and October 1944, Jarrett and his squadron participated successively in the operations against enemy in Palau; Luzon; and in the Ryukyu Islands and Formosa, providing a screen of heavy anti-aircraft fire for allied aircraft carriers and repulsed three determined enemy aircraft attacks without damage to the Fast Carrier Task Force. He was decorated with Silver Star for this service. Jarrett then led his reinforced squadron of nine Fletcher-class destroyers during the battles in the vicinity of Ryukyu Islands and Tokyo and received Bronze Star Medal with Combat "V".

== Postwar service ==
Jarrett returned to the United States in June 1945 and joined the Underway Training Unit at San Diego, California, remaining there until November 1946. He was then appointed commanding officer of light cruiser Astoria and participated in the patrol cruises with the Pacific Fleet in Central Pacific off Guam and Saipan. Jarrett was transferred to Norfolk Navy Yard in October 1947 and assumed duty as Chief of staff and aide on the staff of Commander Training Command, Atlantic Fleet under Rear admiral Carl F. Holden. While in this capacity, he was co-responsible for the planning and administration of Atlantic Fleet operational training until July 1949, when he was promoted to the rank of rear admiral.

He was subsequently ordered to Washington, D.C., where he reported to the Office of the Chief of Naval Operations as Plans and policy officer, Naval Reserve Section. Jarrett served consecutively under admirals Louis E. Denfeld, Forrest P. Sherman, and William M. Fechteler, before assumed duty as the first U.S. Senior Military Attaché, Formosa (Taiwan) in July 1950. He was stationed in Taipei after the embassy moved to Taiwan from its original chancery in Mainland China. Jarrett remained in that capacity until November 1951, when he was recalled to the United States and received Collar Order of the Cloud and Banner by the Government of Republic of China for his service.

Upon his return, Jarrett assumed command of Destroyer Flotilla 4, which he held until April 1952, when he was appointed commander, Cruiser Division 4, operating with the Atlantic Fleet. He served in this capacity until February 1953, when he was ordered back to Washington, D.C., and assumed duty as Deputy Naval Inspector General under Rear admiral J. Cary Jones.

== Retirement ==
Jarrett retired from active duty on 1 November 1954 after 32 years of commissioned service and was advanced to the rank of vice admiral on the retired list for having been specially commended in combat. He settled in Washington and worked for Burton, Dana & Co., a member of the New York Stock Exchange. Jarrett later moved to San Diego, California, where he died on 9 April 1974, aged 75. Vice admiral Harry B. Jarrett was buried with full military honors at the United States Naval Academy Cemetery at Annapolis, Maryland. He was survived by his wife Mary Ward Dunn Jarrett (1904 – 1982).

== Decorations ==
Here is the ribbon bar of Vice admiral Jarrett:

Submarine Warfare insignia
1st Row	Navy Cross		
2nd Row	Silver Star	Legion of Merit with Combat "V" and one 5/16" Gold Star	Bronze Star Medal with Combat "V"
3rd Row	World War I Victory Medal (While Midshipman)	American Defense Service Medal with "A" Device	American Campaign Medal
4th Row	European–African–Middle Eastern Campaign Medal	Asiatic–Pacific Campaign Medal with one silver and four bronze 3/16 inch service stars	World War II Victory Medal
5th Row	National Defense Service Medal	Philippine Liberation Medal with two stars	Order of the Cloud and Banner, 5th Class (Republic of China)

== See also ==
- USS Jarrett (FFG-33)
