= Arthur Jarrett =

Arthur Jarrett may refer to:

- Arthur L. Jarrett (1884–1960), American screenwriter and film actor
- Art Jarrett (1907–1987), his son, American singer, actor and bandleader
- Arthur William Jarrett (1874–1942), pioneer radio broadcaster in South Australia
- Arthur Jarrett, a fictional character from Monty Python and the Meaning of Life
