= Jason Jarrett =

Jason Jarrett may refer to:

- Jason Jarrett (racing driver) (born 1975), racer in NASCAR and in the ARCA RE/MAX Series
- Jason Jarrett (footballer) (born 1979), English professional footballer
