= Jarrett =

Jarrett, Jarratt, Jarrott or Jarret may refer to:

== People ==
- Jarrett (name), a page for people with the name "Jarrett"

== Places ==
=== United States ===
- Jarratt, Virginia
- Jarrett, Minnesota
- Jarrett, West Virginia
- Jarrettsville, Maryland

=== France ===
- Jarret, Hautes-Pyrénées, commune

== Other ==
- Jarrett (film), a 1973 TV movie
- USS Jarrett (FFG-33), a U.S. guided-missile frigate
- Jarrett Tibbs, a character in Cyberbully (2011 film)

== See also ==
- Planet Jarrett, a professional wrestling stable
