= William Jarrett =

William Jarrett may refer to:

- William Paul Jarrett, delegate to the U.S. House of Representatives from Hawaii Territory
- William Fleming Hoggan Jarrett, British pathologist
- William Joseph Jarrett, British politician and trade unionist
