= Michael Jarrett (cricketer) =

English cricketer (born 1972)

Personal information
- Full name: Michael Eugene Dominic Jarrett
- Born: 18 September 1972 (age 54); Lambeth, London, England
- Batting: Right-handed
- Bowling: Right-arm medium
- Role: Wicket-keeper

Domestic team information
- Years: Team
- 1992–1993: Cambridge University
- 1995–1996: Oxford University

Career statistics
Competition	First-class
Matches	31
Runs scored	602
Batting average	13.30
100s/50s	–/2
Top score	51
Balls bowled	12
Wickets	0
Bowling average	–
5 wickets in innings	–
10 wickets in match	–
Best bowling	–
Catches/stumpings	17/1
- Source: Cricinfo, 18 May 2020

Michael Eugene Dominic Jarrett FRCS (born 18 September 1972) is an English medical doctor and former first-class cricketer.

Jarrett was born at Lambeth in September 1972. He was educated at Harrow School, before going up to Girton College, Cambridge, where he studied medicine. While studying at Cambridge, he played first-class cricket for Cambridge University, making his debut against Leicestershire at Fenner's in 1992. He played first-class cricket for Cambridge until 1993, making a total of seventeen appearances. He scored 383 runs in his seventeen matches for Cambridge, at an average of 16.65 and a high score of 51. After Cambridge, Jarrett undertook further studies in medicine at Worcester College at the University of Oxford. He played further first-class matches for Oxford University in 1995 and 1996, making fourteen appearances. He scored 219 runs in these matches, at an average of 19.90 and a high score of 50 not out. While playing for Oxford, Jarrett also undertook wicket-keeping duties, taking 12 catches and making a single stumping.

A fellow of the Fellowship of the Royal Colleges of Surgeons, Jarrett became a colorectal surgeon.
