= Jarrett Byers =

American football player (born 1985)

Jarett Byers
No. 82
- Position: Wide receiver

Personal information
- Born: August 30, 1985 (age 41); Kansas City, Kansas, U.S.
- Listed height: 5 ft 11 in (1.80 m)
- Listed weight: 190 lb (86 kg)

Career information
- College: Northeastern State
- NFL draft: 2009: undrafted

Career history
- St. Louis Rams (2009)*; Tulsa Talons (2010)*
- * Offseason or practice squad member only

Awards and highlights
- Little All-American (2008); Lone Star Conference North Division Receiver of the Year (2006); First-team Lone Star Conference North Division selection (2006); Second-team Lone Star Conference North Division selection (2005)

Jarrett Byers (born August 3, 1985) is an American former football wide receiver. He was signed by the St. Louis Rams as an undrafted free agent in 2009. He played college football at Northeastern State.

== College career ==
Byers, from Kansas City, Kansas, is a three-year starter and 2008 Little All-America choice in football. He transferred from Coffeyville Community College to Northeastern State University in 2005. He finished 2008 with 57 catches for 699 yards and eight touchdowns. It was his skills as a kick returner that emerged in 2008 as he returned nine kickoffs for 338 yards and two touchdowns. An injury cut short his senior season in 2007. However, he bypassed an opportunity to enter the NFL draft a year ago after receiving a medical hardship waiver and was granted an additional season. Byers came back to Northeastern State where he broke school career records for receptions (165), receiving yards (2,545) and touchdowns (28). In 2006, he was selected as the Lone Star Conference North Division Receiver of the Year and to the First-team All-LSC-North. Recorded 51 receptions for 844 yards and 11 touchdowns and averaged 16.5 yards per catch. Byers also rushed for 182 yards on 14 carries and one touchdown, and returned six kickoffs for 113 yards. In 2005 had 43 receptions for 896 yards and nine touchdowns. Averaged 20.8 yards per catch and 99.6 yards per game while earning Second-team All-LSC-North.

== Professional career ==
=== St. Louis Rams ===
On April 26, 2009, Byers was signed as an undrafted free agent by the St. Louis Rams. He was waived on September 1.

=== Tulsa Talons ===
Byers spent the 2010 off-season with the Tulsa Talons of the Arena Football League. He was released by the Talons on March 27, 2010.
