= Pure Pwnage =

- Title screen
- Genre: Mockumentary; Comedy
- Created by: Jarett Cale; Geoff Lapaire
- Starring: Jarett Cale; Geoff Lapaire; Joel Gardiner
- Country of origin: Canada
- Original language: English
- No. of seasons: 2 (web series); 1 (TV series)
- No. of episodes: 18 (web series); 8 (TV series) (list of episodes)

Production
- Executive producers: Derek Harvie; Catherine Tait; Ron Mann
- Producers: Jarett Cale; Geoff Lapaire
- Production locations: Toronto, Ontario
- Running time: 10–50 minutes (web series); 22 minutes (TV series)

Original release
- Network: Showcase (TV series)
- Release: Web series: May 11, 2004 – August 23, 2008; Television series: March 12, 2010 – April 30, 2010

Pure Pwnage (pronounced "pure ownage") is a Canadian Internet-distributed mockumentary series from ROFLMAO Productions. The fictional series purports to chronicle the life and adventures of Jeremy (played by Jarett Cale), a Canadian and self-proclaimed "pro gamer". In 2010, an adaptation of the web series began airing on Showcase, a Canadian cable television channel, but the series failed to be picked up for a second season.

== Premise ==
Pure Pwnage is a web series that follows the life of Jeremy, a skilled gamer who struggles with social interactions due to his self-centered and lazy nature. The show focuses on Jeremy's interactions within the gaming community and with non-gamers. Jeremy's brother Kyle documents his experiences, creating a documentary-style narrative.

Jeremy (played by Jarett Cale) is 26 years old[1] and is a stereotypical gamer. He lives in Toronto, Ontario, Canada with his younger brother, Kyle. Jeremy spends the vast majority of his time playing video games and "pwning n00bs", using the online handle teh_pwnerer. He has been playing games since the age of two, when he used to "toaly pwn Pong". Due to Jeremy's profound immersion in video game culture, his social skills have atrophied. Because Jeremy has lived in his basement for most of his life, he has had very little conversation with any other person and has therefore taught himself how to speak. His accent is slurred, full of interjections such as "like" and "'n' stuff," and employs Leetspeak. However, he has also developed the ability to quickly master any video game, and can play competitively against extremely skilled opponents. Jeremy often makes narcissistic comments about himself.

== Episodes ==
There are currently eighteen web episodes available to the public and eight TV episodes.

=== Series overview ===
List of Pure Pwnage episodes
Series	Season	Episodes	Originally released		DVD release date
Series	Season	Episodes	First released	Last released	DVD release date
Web series	1	12	May 11, 2004	November 6, 2006	May 23, 2007
Web series	2	6	May 4, 2007	August 23, 2008	—N/a
Television series	1	8	March 12, 2010	April 30, 2010	March 3, 2011 (Region 4); April 16, 2011 (Worldwide)

=== Web series ===
==== Season 1 (2004–06) ====
The first season was released between 2004 and 2006. Twelve episodes were released at irregular intervals online, and are still available for streaming on the official website. The later episodes had premiere screenings. The first season is available on a 4 disc DVD box set, which includes all 12 episodes in DVD quality, commentary tracks, subtitles in 12 languages, cast interviews, bloopers, outtakes, extra scenes, E3 Special and more.

No. overall	No. in season	Title	Directed by	Written by	Original release date	Running time
1	1	"The Life of a Pro Gamer"	Geoff Lapaire	Geoff Lapaire & Jarett Cale	May 11, 2004	11:36 (Note: Runtime of initial release was 13:14)
The first episode of Pure Pwnage, introducing Jeremy and Kyle. Jeremy explains why he is making this show, and how he lives. By making this show, he believes that he can help any given person be more like him, and less of a "noob". After this introduction, Jeremy visits an Internet forum and replies to posts he sees as unreasonable, or foolish. After going out for a meal, he comments on a "Free Tibet" protest, using RTS terminology. Finally, Jeremy resumes playing video games, and introduces his pelvic thrust victory posture.
2	2	"Girls"	Geoff Lapaire	Geoff Lapaire & Jarett Cale	June 22, 2004	16:08
This episode is interspersed with interviews of females displaying their knowledge and opinions of games and gaming terminology. After learning that Kyle had a girlfriend, Jeremy is challenged to prove that he can also attract women. He attempts to attract them with various techniques, which usually have something to do with gaming skills and strategies. After a misunderstanding with a homosexual man, the concept of which was later revisited in episode 18, he makes one last try and leaves. Back home, he claims to have met a girl who actually kissed him. The viewers find out later (in episode 6) that he did actually kiss a girl, Anastasia a.k.a. Tagi. Music: "Teh n00b song"
3	3	"FPS Doug"	Geoff Lapaire	Geoff Lapaire & Jarett Cale	July 19, 2004	12:00
Jeremy begins by visiting two friends that are from "Europia or whatever" who translate messages for all the "Germanic" and "Hollandaise" fans of the show. Jeremy complains about EA, the company that develops and produces his favorite game, Command & Conquer: Generals – Zero Hour. Jeremy expresses his disappointment that EA discontinued support for Zero Hour. Afterward, Jeremy comes across his old friend Doug (a.k.a. "FPS Doug") in a parking lot, who is fending off imaginary adversaries. Jeremy explains the story of their childhood friendship, and their subsequent falling out. As a "behind the scenes" featurette, Dave (Dawei) is shown for the first time, as the crew member who held a lamp in Jeremy’s room in episode 2.
4	4	"Pwn or Be Pwned"	Geoff Lapaire	Geoff Lapaire & Jarett Cale	September 14, 2004	20:57
The episode starts off with a spoof of the machinima Red vs. Blue using Command & Conquer: Generals – Zero Hour. After this, Jeremy loses to a "noob" in Zero Hour and must then visit the mysterious master gamer known as Teh_Masterer. Teh_Masterer provides Jeremy the next level training, in which the student learns a valuable lesson: "If one wants to truly pwn, one must pwn in all games". A parody of Kill Bill ensues and the episode reaches its climax with an epic micro battle. This is a turning point in Jeremy’s pro gamer life, and his T-shirt message is mysteriously upgraded from "Übergamer" to "i pwn n00bs". At the very end, Jeremy is seen walking into EB to purchase Half-Life 2. Music: "Feel Like Pwning Noobs"
5	5	"M8s"	Geoff Lapaire	Geoff Lapaire & Jarett Cale	December 6, 2004	14:55
Jeremy "graciously" lets Kyle show a short film he made in film school, titled "Strong Man, Angry Man". After viewing the short film, Jeremy laughs and sarcastically mentions to Kyle that the film was "pretty good". Next, Jeremy insults Kyle’s camera skills, and claims that Kyle’s films will never pwn. They end up having an argument, causing Kyle to depart with his camera. He decides to start filming Doug instead, but Doug loses, due to lag, and develops a tantrum. Escaping Doug’s somewhat psychotic behaviour, Kyle walks away to consider his dispute with Jeremy. Kyle realizes that their friendship is more important than creative differences, and they remain friends, or "mates" as the title implies.
6	6	"Imapwnu of Azeroth"	Geoff Lapaire	Geoff Lapaire & Jarett Cale	March 25, 2005	20:24
Jeremy's computer has been confiscated by his mother, so he has intentions to spend the night playing Counter-Strike: Source at Dave’s place. However, Kyle wants him to meet up with Anastasia, a girl who also likes to play video games, before going to Dave’s. Once he meets her, he realizes that she is the girl who kissed him in Episode 2, although Kyle did not believe him at the time. After their second encounter, Jeremy has a strong desire to see Anastasia again. Despite his strong disliking of Warcraft and MMORPGs, he decides to buy World of Warcraft in order to meet up with her in the game world. Jeremy uses Dave’s computer to play, and soon falls in love with both Anastasia and WoW. Music: "World of Warcraft Is a Feeling"
7	7	"MMO Grrl"	Geoff Lapaire	Geoff Lapaire & Jarett Cale	June 30, 2005	15:32
Jeremy has been admitted to the Centre for Addiction and Mental Health in a comatose state, believing himself to still be in the game (WoW). He has flashbacks of his experience playing WoW with Anastasia. Jeremy has a gaming-related epiphany and awakes from the coma. At the end, the Pure Pwnage friends innocently hold a barbecue, and all seems well. However, a mysterious man, who has been secretly following Jeremy throughout the series, sends a troubling e-mail, ordering an unnamed receiver to send "deathstriker6666" after Jeremy.
8	8	"Lanageddon"	Geoff Lapaire	Geoff Lapaire & Jarett Cale	September 19, 2005	22:33
Jeremy and Doug have started to play video games together again, just like they have before their feud. Jeremy receives an ominous phone call, foreshadowing events to come. Faced with the approach of LANageddon, Jeremy and Doug teach each other about their respective mastered game genres: Jeremy instructs Doug about RTS games while Doug returns the favour by informing Jeremy about FPS games. Eventually, they arrive at LANageddon where they sign up for the CS:S tournament. The two easily win each game, and are destined to meet each other at the finals. However, they encounter a confident, loud-mouthed adversary known as "deathstriker6666", whom they discover very quickly to be no "noob". Music: "I'm a Gamer" and "Building a Computer (for Teh_Pwnerer)"
9	9	"The Story of Dave"	Geoff Lapaire	Geoff Lapaire & Jarett Cale	December 9, 2005 (Live Screening); December 10, 2005 (Online)	25:47
The beginning of the episode is a Call of Duty 2 machinima, featuring FPS Doug and Jeremy playing as soldiers. They make a reference to Pulp Fiction; Doug says "Man, I hope you don't have a watch up your ass". After the skit, Kyle decides to do an episode solely centering around Dave, because of his online popularity. The next scene involves FPS Doug receiving a new weapon from a friend of Teh_Masterer, and it parodies several scenes from the film Taxi Driver. Back to Jeremy and Dave, they encounter Anastasia, who is with a guy who is a jock, which aggravates Jeremy. After a heated exchange, Jeremy storms off, clearly very angry. After a while, the trio are confronted by a crowd of unknown micro warriors, who attack them. During the middle of the battle, the action cuts off to an important flashback of Dave’s past in China, revealing his gaming history. Suddenly he breaks, and comes to the rescue, helping to drive away the attackers. Jeremy, Dave, and Kyle immediately consult Teh_Masterer, who orders Jeremy to find more pro-gamers. Upon arriving home, Jeremy finds a sad note left by Dave on the table, indicating his apologies and exit from the show.
10	10	"Teh Best Day Ever"	Geoff Lapaire	Geoff Lapaire & Jarett Cale	March 11, 2006 (Live Screening); March 16, 2006 (Online)	27:26
Jeremy begins the show with a homage to Strong Bad E-Mails from the Homestar Runner Internet series. Jeremy and Kyle have moved out of their mother's house, and are living in their own spartan apartment. Jeremy has been unable to play video games, due to the lack of a powerful PC or a television for console gaming. Instead, Jeremy focuses on improving his RL skills, such as cooking and holding a job, though he fails at each endeavour. Doug comes over as an attempt to cheer Jeremy up, but their fun is short-lived as Anastasia arrives and gets into an argument with Jeremy. Jeremy becomes depressed and joins MySpace and claims he doesn't want to work on the show anymore. But when a touching e-mail reminds him of the many lives that find inspiration in Pure Pwnage, he realizes the futility of his self-defeating attitude. He eventually steals his powerful PC from his mother and makes up with Anastasia with a kiss. Music: "Get outta myspace"
11	11	"i <3 u in rl"	Geoff Lapaire	Geoff Lapaire & Jarett Cale	June 18, 2006 (Live Screening); June 21, 2006 (Online)	21:36
After reconciling, Jeremy and Anastasia spend most of their time together playing separate games in Jeremy's apartment. Later, en route to meeting Doug, Jeremy must flee from a group of enthusiastic Pure Pwnage fans. Doug reveals that he is carrying his Sega Master Light Phaser, and displays that it is functional in RL. Suddenly, Teh_Masterer calls Jeremy from a nearby pay phone, telling him to go to the Netherlands. Immediately, the scene switches to a council of mysterious people who discuss Teh_Masterer's training scheme. Jeremy and Kyle visit the Netherlands using the money from the eBay auction of Jeremy's hair, where Jeremy engages in more micro training. This dangerous trip infuriates Jeremy, but pleases Teh_Masterer. An unrelated footage follows the episode where Jeremy makes fun of sheep by imitating "lol" (pronounced "lawl") like a sheep at forum user Skrie's farm.
12	12	"Game Over"	Geoff Lapaire	Geoff Lapaire & Jarett Cale	October 28, 2006 (Live Screening); November 6, 2006 (Online)	48:23
Jeremy and Kyle are invited by local TV station executives to discuss the possibility of bringing the Pure Pwnage show to television. Jeremy, much to Kyle’s dismay, quickly ruins the proposition by taunting the TV executives and getting dismissed. The two then go to visit Anastasia. Along the way, a little dog begins to follow them. Anastasia greets the two at her door, and, seeing Jeremy in his suit from his earlier meeting with the TV executives, assumes that he remembered that today is their anniversary. Anastasia produces a gift for Jeremy, a Nintendo DS Lite, and Jeremy, in panic, offers her the dog that followed him and Kyle, naming him "Dick" in the process. Jeremy and Anastasia go into town for a date, with Kyle tagging along for camera duty. They drink heavily, downing multiple Jägermeister shots, at the restaurant where Jeremy and Anastasia first formally met. On their way home, they meet Doug, who needs a place to stay for the night; Jeremy reluctantly allows him to stay in his apartment. After a few days, Jeremy and Anastasia understandably grow weary of Doug’s presence in their bed. Jeremy finally informs Doug that he and Anastasia would like some time alone. Doug walks away offended and smashes a large CRT television he was carrying on his shoulder. In the next segment, Jeremy offers a few parting words to his viewers while sitting with Anastasia, thanking his audience for watching the show. After the screen fades to black, Jeremy dreams that he is in the world of Azeroth with Anastasia, where she is ambushed by two Horde characters. Waking up, Jeremy finds a message on Anastasia’s pillow that states that she had been kidnapped. Jeremy goes to rescue Anastasia from the mysterious building where she is held captive by the Big Bad. After defeating the Spy, deathstriker6666, and the Power Glove Man with superior micro skills, Jeremy faces the Big Bad and delivers a micro onslaught. Jeremy’s attack is useless against the powerful Big Bad, who absorbs Jeremy's attack with his hand and mockingly proceeds to eat a grapefruit. Jeremy, however, is confident that help is on its way in the form of Teh_Masterer and his gamer army. Big Bad tells him he has "No chance to survive; Make your time," a reference to the internet meme "All Your Base Are Belong To Us". Just then, Doug arrives on the scene. Jeremy does a celebratory dance, boasting how The Big Bad will now get pwned. But the traitorous Doug, who had joined forces with the Big Bad, points his Sega Master Light Phaser at Jeremy’s head. The Big Bad allows Anastasia to escape with Kyle. As the two reach safety and look back, a micro battle ensues. Kyle faces Anastasia and lowers his camera, revealing his face for the first time in the series. On April 29, 2007, Kyle posted an article on the front page indicating that there was extra content added to the beginning of Episode 12. This extra content appears after the Tetris fight. The new extended intro showed an extra James Bond style opening.

==== Season 2 (2007–08) ====
The second season was released between 2007 and 2008, with 6 episodes currently released. The second season was put on hold due to the death of cast member Troy Dixon (T-Bag). In January 2011, a forum post by Jarett Cale explained, "After struggling to continue the web series myself, I've now placed it on indefinite hold. While this doesn't mean it's officially 'dead', that is unfortunately the most likely outcome."

No. overall	No. in season	Title	Directed by	Written by	Original release date	Running time
13	1	"Old Habits"	Geoff Lapaire	Geoff Lapaire & Jarett Cale	April 14, 2007 (Live Screening); May 4, 2007 (Online)	32:06
This episode is shot in reverse order. It begins with Jeremy's younger self playing with a NES Controller and meeting Doug who is playing with a NES Zapper. The scene is set previous to the pilot episode with Jeremy wearing his old ubergamer shirt. Kyle needs some footage for his University course and makes a deal with Jeremy to be filmed for one day, saying at the end "Nothing bad will come of it". A montage, reminiscent of the Lost intro, showing the season's previous greatest moments ends with Jeremy awake in his bed the same way he did in episode one. He talks about waking up after his "near-pwned experience"—a reference to the cliffhanger ending the previous episode. Due to his gaming skill, Jeremy quickly finds himself in the possession of an Xbox 360 and a Wii; however he seems to lose interest in this after receiving a package from EA with the latest installment of the Command & Conquer series, Tiberium Wars. After playing Tiberium Wars, he gives a monologue on how he would have never survived without his friends and Dave appears behind him saying "Hey guys, stew's done, just the way you like it". The episode then continues from the end of Episode 12, with Dave appearing to save Jeremy from The Big Bad. When Dave uses his micro on Doug, his blaster pistol fires, killing or incapacitating Big Bad with a headshot. However, Jeremy was hit by a micro blast from The Big Bad and is carried out by Dave.
14	2	"Lifestyles"	Geoff Lapaire	Geoff Lapaire & Jarett Cale	July 14, 2007 (Live Screening); July 25, 2007 (Online)	30:24
The episode begins with Jeremy getting up early to eat the breakfast that Dave has made. Shortly after, Jeremy initiates Dave's "training" by playing Dead or Alive 4. Kyle argues that they are not doing anything meaningful for the show, so they reluctantly go outside to play Frisbee. Later on, as Jeremy and Kyle walk in the streets, they find themselves in a Gay Pride parade during Pride Week. That night, Anastasia, Jeremy, and Kyle go out for dinner and are met by Dan from the TV studio and his girlfriend, Jacky. Jacky and Anastasia have a heated argument over the usefulness of games. The couple leave and Kyle remarks that "she's like [his] ex-girlfriend"; Anastasia then notices a woman who is alone and convinces Kyle to approach her, although her partner soon rejoins her. After a short conversation, Kyle returns to Anastasia and Jeremy and states he is going out with the two and that he needs to take the camera. The next day, Jeremy, Dave, and Anastasia play Tiberium Wars, DOA4, and The Burning Crusade respectively at the "LANapalooza" gamer event in Aurora, Ontario. Upon returning home, Jeremy and Anastasia argue about how Anastasia takes WoW too seriously; in almost a role reversal, Jeremy says games are "supposed to be fun" and that Anastasia is "freaking out" too much and should log out for five minutes. Anastasia angrily storms out of the room with her account still logged in. Jeremy then goes over to her computer and contemplatively deletes Anastasia's level 70 Human Warrior (full tier 5). There is also a small segment at the end featuring Dave. It is aptly named "Pro at Cooking with Dave", and shows Dave cooking a stew.
15	3	"T-Bag"	Geoff Lapaire	Geoff Lapaire & Jarett Cale	November 3, 2007 (Live Screening); November 10, 2007 (Online)	25:24
The episode opens with a machinima of Team Fortress 2. After this, Jeremy, Kyle and Dave attend a Gamer Army lecture by Teh_Masterer, which Jeremy finds boring. Jeremy and Kyle then visit Anastasia. Though Jeremy deleted her character, Anastasia has assumed her account was hacked, and thus is not mad – on the contrary, the time away from WoW has changed her attitude completely. Later, Jeremy excitedly prepares for the release of Halo 3 in his apartment. When purchasing the game, he encounters Terrence "T-Bag" Brown, a professional Halo player, who invites Jeremy to his weekend launch party. The episode then segues into a music video featuring T-Bag and Jeremy before heading the launch party. There, Jeremy finds Doug, and challenges him to a Halo 3 duel. Following an altercation between the two, Jeremy leaves the party. In a narrow hallway with numerous identical doors, two government agents unlock a weapon, the Menacer, to give to Doug, claiming that he has the power to prevent the war Teh_Masterer is preparing the Gamer Army for. Doug walks towards the camera saying "its headshot time!". Back in the apartment, Jeremy enthusiastically plays TF2 and appears to have forgotten about Halo 3.
16	4	"Duty Calls"	Geoff Lapaire	Geoff Lapaire & Jarett Cale	March 1, 2008 (Live Screening); March 8, 2008 (Online)	27:47
As a prologue, the episode begins with a homage to Back to the Future and Jeremy playing Rock Band. In order to make some money, Jeremy goes to a local computer shop and sells the parts that he has earned in tournaments—a practice that Teh_Masterer frowns upon. After selling the prizes, the pair go out for breakfast, where Kyle tries to lecture Jeremy on the value of money. On the way to T-Bag's house, Jeremy encounters a man and in a dream sequence, and they battle with Guitar Hero and Rock Band controllers. At T-Bag's fitness room, the two awkwardly discuss different matters, including Doug's camaraderie. Ultimately, T-Bag advises Jeremy about his lack of sponsors, telling him that he should stick to a single game in order to earn money. Jeremy cites Teh_Masterer's quote, "If one wants to truly pwn, one must pwn at all games," but T-Bag ridicules it and insists that Jeremy should get sponsors. The next scene is a machinima short of Call of Duty 4 featuring Jeremy and Doug in a showdown. Afterward, Jeremy returns to his apartment and has a surprise birthday party with Kyle, Tagi, Dave and T-Bag, who all give him presents. When Jeremy and Kyle are the last two left in the apartment, Jeremy gets a surprise visit from Doug. The two reaffirm their friendship and work together playing COD4 on the same team, dominating the server they play on.
17	5	"Just the Guys (Part 1)"	Geoff Lapaire	Geoff Lapaire & Jarett Cale	August 9, 2008 (Live Screening); August 14, 2008 (Online)	23:37
The episode opens with a short parody of Zero Punctuation called "Zero Coordination – on the n00b effect". The real episode begins with Doug and Dave mysteriously negotiating. Shifting one week back to Sunday where Jeremy and Dave are playing Super Smash Bros. Brawl, Dave's student sits and watches. Jeremy mentions that Teh_Masterer has created an 'Exchange Program' where pros come over and are assigned to uber-pros, with the purpose of becoming a better gamer, or "more pro," in Jeremy's own words. Dave's student is ridiculed by the two and when Jeremy wins again, he makes a racial stereotype, asking if Dave knows the score now since he is Chinese and good at math. Dave ejects a white disc in fury, breaking the game. Dave then makes the suggestion of getting ice cream. Jeremy teaches the audience gaming tips, and suggests browsing message boards and playing higher skilled opponents. Shortly after, Jeremy and Doug go out and mention the future games coming out and, much to Kyle's discomfort, about having their n00blets (their potential offspring) together. Jeremy and Doug (along with Kyle, filming) make plans to go to Chinatown for Dim sum. The three later notice Dave heading their way and try to hide to avoid being noticed. Dave then talks to Kyle and Jeremy comes out of hiding and greets Dave. Dave invites Jeremy over for lunch, but Jeremy refuses his offer. Jeremy then walks with Dave with Doug trailing them stealthily. Jeremy attempts to tell Dave about him and Doug being friends again, but Jeremy is not too good with words. Dave splits up, and Doug reappears. Doug and Jeremy finally go for Dim sum. The next day, Jeremy walks up to Anastasia's house hoping to hang out and play. Anastasia mentions that she can't spend time with Jeremy because she has plans later that evening, a girls' night out. She reminds Jeremy that he would have known this if he attended her graduation. Jeremy responds that he was busy and couldn't attend the graduation – he and Doug were just playing Call of Duty 4. Anastasia invites Jeremy to come in, but Jeremy makes up a story on the spot that he forgot today was a guys' night out. Jeremy is shown on his apartment balcony, calling his best buddies to try to make plans to go out that evening. Jeremy gets rejected by Doug and Dave, so Jeremy phones Terence and he accepts. Terence and Jeremy are at a bar having a beer, then Jeremy pulls out two Nintendo DS'. Terence laughs it off, saying he wants Jeremy to do something different than video games for once, so they go to a club. At the club Jeremy spots Anastasia dancing with a guy and grinding on him. After seeing this, Jeremy leaves with Terence. Anastasia spots Jeremy leaving, then runs outside and gets Jeremy's attention. She explains that she was just grinding, and didn't even know the guy. Jeremy goes ballistic and calls her a slut. This infuriates Anastasia; Terence asks the two to calm down and talk about the conflict tomorrow. Anastasia then says there is nothing more to talk about and ends their relationship on the spot. Terence is seen shaking his head and turns towards Jeremy as Jeremy just stands there, considering his future options.
18	6	"Just the Guys (Part 2)"	Geoff Lapaire	Geoff Lapaire & Jarett Cale	August 9, 2008 (Live Screening); August 23, 2008 (Online)	24:33
Jeremy is in bed looking depressed. He doesn't get up and tells Kyle to "fuck off". The next day Jeremy is now under the bed covers and Kyle is trying to force Jeremy awake to make the show. Jeremy refuses at first but he says that he will only do the show under the bed covers. Kyle goes under the bed covers to film Jeremy and Jeremy farts, making Kyle disgusted. He finally gets up and checks his messages. The three messages are all from where Jeremy works to see why he hasn't been coming into work. He ignores all the messages and instead decides to play various games and killing his character in the games. As a result of this, Jeremy is fired from his job. The next day, Jeremy is on his computer erasing or modifying all the pictures of Anastasia on his computer and on Facebook. Kyle suggests they should do something different today so Jeremy could move on. Jeremy pretends that he has forgotten her entirely and that she is now just a girl that he used to date. Terence phones Jeremy to "hang out", he accepts and heads out. Jeremy then mentions that his life is totally awesome now because he has no girlfriend and has no job and has all the time to play games and do whatever he wants. Later on, when Jeremy meets up with Terence, he asks Jeremy whats the situation between Anastasia and him. Jeremy replies that he's done with girls and Terence, concerned about Jeremy's orientation, laughs it off and tells Jeremy that the cure for girl trouble is "more girls". Terence suggests that they should go buy some new clothes and "stuff" for Jeremy. Jeremy gets his shirt changed to a gold lettered "I pwn n00bs" shirt and a gold necklace and sunglasses. Terence implies that Jeremy is now ready to get some girls. The two then see two girls in front of a store and Terence tests Jeremy to see if he could pick them up. Jeremy as usual fails to do so because of his gamer personality, and he begins to doubt his true feelings about women. Terence goes in and manages to get both of them. The girls introduce themselves to Jeremy and Terence and shortly after they go to Terence's yacht where they get to know them more. Jeremy tells Terence that he doesn't like either of them and then they decide to leave the girls and head to Dave's house for a BBQ. The next day Jeremy is playing his Nintendo DS when he gets a phone call from Anastasia to meet. Jeremy accepts thinking that Anastasia wants to reconcile. When Jeremy meets up with Anastasia, she asks Kyle to walk away for a moment since it was a private conversation. Kyle then secretly puts a sound recording device in his own bag and leaves it with them so he could hear the conversation. Jeremy and Anastasia talk about their situation. The main reason Anastasia was there was to give herself reassurance that she wants to end the relationship. Anastasia leaves soon afterward. Kyle walks back to Jeremy to see how it went and Jeremy mentions that it didn't go well and comments that guys make way better friends. Jeremy then walks up the street in depression, taking his gold necklace off. Much later at night, Jeremy and Doug are playing Mario Kart Wii. Jeremy suggests that they should play some Xbox. Kyle says he's going to bed since he has gotten enough footage for today. When opening the disc tray, Jeremy finds a movie disc and Kyle screams to not touch play. Jeremy presses play anyway and it's revealed to be a porn movie that Kyle was making. Jeremy and Doug laugh so hard they spill their drinks. They then begin to take their soaked clothes off when Dave comes and sees what they're doing, he then quietly leaves. The next day, the introduction of Episode 17 is revisited, with Dave and Doug mysteriously negotiating. Jeremy and Terence are also at the table and it's revealed that the four are actually playing poker. Later on, Jeremy is typing his life plans. The list contains the following: 1. MEET MIYAM0T0, 2. MAKE LIEK $50000, 3. BY C&C FRUM EA N GIV 2 BLIZZ, 4. VASECT0MY, 5. LRN 2 B > TEH_MASTERER @ GAMES, 6. M0VE 2 K0RIA, 7. LIV IN TUBE. Kyle asks how Jeremy is going to do all this, and asks him about the vasectomy. Jeremy tells him the game he is making is called that. A knock is then heard, he opens the door, and a girl walks in and sits in Jeremy's chair. Jeremy is surprised thinking that it was one of the girls Terence sent, but the girl reveals herself as Chris (Kris) the 'best of all the young pros' which Teh_Masterer assigned to Jeremy for training.

==== Featurettes ====
Various Pure Pwnage shorts/featurettes can be found on the official website by clicking the "Shorts" menu tab.

=== Television series ===
==== Season 1 (2010) ====
On August 6, 2009, it was announced that a Pure Pwnage TV series had been commissioned by Showcase. All cast members from the web series return for the TV series with the exceptions of Dave Lee (Dave) and Miranda Plant (Anastasia). The TV series sees the addition of new cast member Melanie Scrofano, who plays October. Ten production blog web shorts were released online prior to the show's premiere on television. The show airs on Friday at 10:30 pm ET/PT (previously 10:00 pm) on Showcase. It has now been distributed internationally in countries such as the United States and Australia.

No.	Title	Directed by	Written by	Original release date
1	"The Life of a Pro Gamer"	Michael Kennedy	Jarett Cale & Geoff Lapaire & Mark Steinberg	March 12, 2010
Re-introducing Jeremy and Kyle for the television audience, Jeremy prepares for a ladders match. He soon finds himself without internet as the scheduled match approaches, after his mom cancels the internet and kicks him out. FPS Doug is also re-introduced along with new characters; October, Simon, Doug's Mom and Jeremy's Mom.
2	"Jobs"	Michael Kennedy	Jarett Cale & Geoff Lapaire & Mark Steinberg	March 19, 2010
Living out of a tent in his mom's front yard, Jeremy explores his job options. Meanwhile, October takes action when she is demoted from raid leader to a regular guild member. Kenny Hotz from Kenny vs. Spenny guest stars.
3	"Girls"	Samir Rehem	Jarett Cale & Geoff Lapaire	March 26, 2010
October's signals continue to go unreceived, while Kyle makes a bet with Jeremy that he can't get a girl to have sex with him in one week. FPS Doug takes to a more comfortable fashion and expands his recreational repertoire.
4	"Rock On"	Samir Rehem	Jarett Cale & Geoff Lapaire	April 2, 2010
A look behind the scenes of the Rock Band "the_pwnerers." Tension forms amongst the band, when Jeremy's focus remains on the score, rather than the music. Steve Kudlow guest stars.
5	"Who's Afraid of the Big Bad Doug?"	Ian MacDonald	Jarett Cale & Geoff Lapaire	April 9, 2010
Doug is mistakenly arrested on charges of mugging a lady in the park. Jeremy becomes addicted to an MMO and Kyle and October attempt to help him.
6	"The Day the LAN Centre Stood Still"	Ian MacDonald	Jarett Cale & Geoff Lapaire	April 16, 2010
To show support for Doug as he begins his sentence of six weeks without gaming, October organizes a challenge as to who can last 24-hours without gaming which leads to high levels of boredom and Jeremy and Doug on a streak of vandalism.
7	"Losing to a n00b"	Graeme Lynch	Jarett Cale & Geoff Lapaire	April 23, 2010
Jeremy loses a StarCraft match to a "n00b" and therefore concludes that he has become a "n00b" himself and decides to live a normal life. Meanwhile, Tyrel falls in love with a girl whom he meets online, stirring interest at The Mouse and Pad. Billy Mitchell guest stars.
8	"Pwnageddon"	Graeme Lynch	Jarett Cale & Geoff Lapaire & Mark Steinberg	April 30, 2010
The gang attends the annual "Pwnageddon" gaming convention. Jeremy must defend his consecutive first place title after suffering an injury from a scheming competitor. Meanwhile, Doug joins the army.

== History ==
Pure Pwnage was created by Geoff Lapaire and Jarett Cale who also play the show's main protagonists. Originating in 2004, eighteen Internet-distributed episodes of the series have been released to date. In 2007, the series creators estimated their current viewer base to be over three million. The series is filmed primarily in Toronto, Ontario, but has also included scenes filmed in Calgary, Alberta; Montreal, Quebec; Aurora, Ontario; Hamilton, Ontario; and the Netherlands.

During an interview, director Geoff Lapaire (although as "Kyle"; Lapaire maintained his "Kyle" identity among fans and media) insisted that all of the characters on the show are not acting. He suggested that the personalities on Pure Pwnage display their true-to-life abilities and eccentricities. The characters took great pains to maintain that the Pure Pwnage world is simply an extension of the real world. Lapaire has finally admitted that they are, in fact, actors. The sixth fanchat with the crew was out-of-character, where the fact that the characters within Pure Pwnage are exaggerated versions of the actors was confirmed.

On August 6, 2009, it was announced that a Pure Pwnage TV series had been commissioned by Showcase. Upon the announcement, many members of the Pure Pwnage fan community raised concerns. The main complaints were that the series was only announced to be airing in Canada, and the assumption that it would be changed in order to appeal to viewers not familiar with internet culture. Jarett Cale, who writes the show and plays Jeremy, tried to quell the complaints on the Pure Pwnage forums, saying "We're doing our best to get it broadcast in the USA, UK, Australia, etc., but it's really up to each country's respective broadcasters. [...] Geoff and I are still the main creative force – we're producers and writers. We've also brought on many new people with experience in traditional television to help us out both story-wise and production-wise. FPS Doug will still be there, and he will still be played by Joel Gardiner." In response to a user asking if the TV series meant there would be no more web episodes, he said "Nope, it only means there's a new TV series."

Despite this, the future of the web series was uncertain. Geoff Lapaire, director of all previous episodes of Pure Pwnage, left the show in September 2008 to focus on the then-unannounced TV series, and Troy Dixon, who played T-Bag in the series, died in a car accident on December 6, 2008. Jarett Cale announced in January 2009 that work on the next web episode had begun, with him as the director, however, the episode has not been released.

In a short Livestream cast on March 15, 2010, a user posted a comment regarding the web series and Jarett replied that the web series is back in production and is in progress. He has not given out an ETA.

On January 19, 2011, Jarett announced on the Pure Pwnage forums that the TV series had not been picked up for a second season. Additionally, the web series has been put on indefinite hold. In his own words: "My hope that Pure Pwnage will see a proper ending to its illustrious web series has nearly vanished. I've let Geoff know that should he be willing at any time to resume some of his traditional, critical roles on the web series I will fly home to Toronto in a heartbeat to help make it happen."

On September 18, 2012 The Pure Pwnage YouTube channel uploaded a video titled "010100100100010101010100010101010101001001001110" which is a binary encoding of the word "Return", signalling the return of the Pure Pwnage.

== Pure Pwnage Teh Movie ==
On September 19, 2012, an official crowd funding campaign was announced to aid in the funding of a Pure Pwnage movie. The $75,000 goal was raised in just over 24 hours, due to overwhelming support from fans all over the world. At the end of the campaign, a total of $211,300 was raised.

On November 22, 2015, the official trailer was released. The movie premiered in Toronto on January 23, 2016, at the Bloor Cinema. Further screenings took place around the US and in the UK.

On May 7, 2016, Pure Pwnage Teh Movie was released for streaming and digital download via Vimeo.

=== Reception and awards ===
Pure Pwnage Teh Movie received the Canadian Comedy Awards 2016 award for best feature film. The film was well-received by general audiences.

== Spin-offs ==
=== TV series ===
On August 6, 2009, it was announced that a Pure Pwnage TV series had been commissioned by Showcase. The announcement was made in the form of a mini-episode where Kyle tries to convince Jeremy to stop playing on his Nintendo DS Lite and make the announcement. The series had been teased for several months under the name "Project X". The TV series premiered on Showcase March 12, 2010, and premiered on Australia's ABC2 on October 4, 2010. According to creator Jarett Cale, the TV series itself takes place in a fictional world within the Pure Pwnage universe (webseries) where Kyle ironically got a TV series, thus explaining the lack of consistency between shows.

=== Jeremy's Mail Sac ===
Starting in March 2010, the Pure Pwnage website began letting fans send Jeremy questions via e-mail. Jeremy then answered the fan questions in video segments posted on the website titled Jeremy's Mail Sac.

=== Pro at Cooking ===
Starring Dave (Dawei) as himself, Pro at Cooking is a spin-off of Pure Pwnage. A cooking show for gamers with Dave hosting as the main chef. When his female assistants do not perform as expected, Dave constantly fires each one of them usually after every episode. Directed by Davin, it has only aired seven 5- to 10-minute episodes. No other characters from Pure Pwnage, excluding Dave, Davin, and Geoff, appear on the show.

=== Pure Pwnage: The Comic ===
From February 28, 2006 to March 7, 2007, the Pure Pwnage website featured a regularly issued comic, of which a new page was released once every two to three weeks. Apparently set in the "real world" rather than in the fictional world of Pure Pwnage, the comic breaks most of the fourth wall of the show. For example, Dave said in the show that he was leaving it due to unfinished business in China, the comic claims that the real reason was that he had found a new job in Vancouver.

However, both the show and comic clearly contain elements that are either symbolic representations of reality (for example, pwning an opponent with "micro balls" as a possible metaphor for pwning them in an actual video game) or are not based in reality whatsoever.

=== Pure Pwnage: Teh Movie ===
In September 2012, series creators Jarett Cale and Geoff Lapaire announced an indiegogo campaign to raise funds for a Pure Pwnage feature-length film. Within 24 hours of the campaign being launched, the project had received its goal of $75,000, and by the end of the campaign, they had reached a total of $211,300. Despite this being a relatively small film budget, Jarett Cale and Geoff Lapaire have said that with their experience of making the web series with an extremely limited amount of funds, they are confident that they would be able to make a quality film shot in countries across the world, mentioning hopes of filming in South Korea. Pre-production began in earnest in early 2013, with weekly twitch.tv live streams in which Lapaire, Cale, and guests such as Joel Gardiner (fps_doug) and Miranda Plant (Tagi) discuss the film and interact with fans.

The film also featured Nathan Adams as an Accounting Associate, Ajay Fry as himself, and actors Gwenlyn Cumyn, Thomas Finn, and Alberta Mayne

The film premiered on January 23, 2016, in Toronto, Ontario. Following this, Cale and Lapaire took the film to the road, screening the project around the world in a touring limited release.

On May 7, 2016, Pure Pwnage Teh Movie was released for streaming and digital download on Vimeo.
