= Skegby =

Village in Nottinghamshire, England

Coordinates: 53.1440°N 1.2636°W

- Village
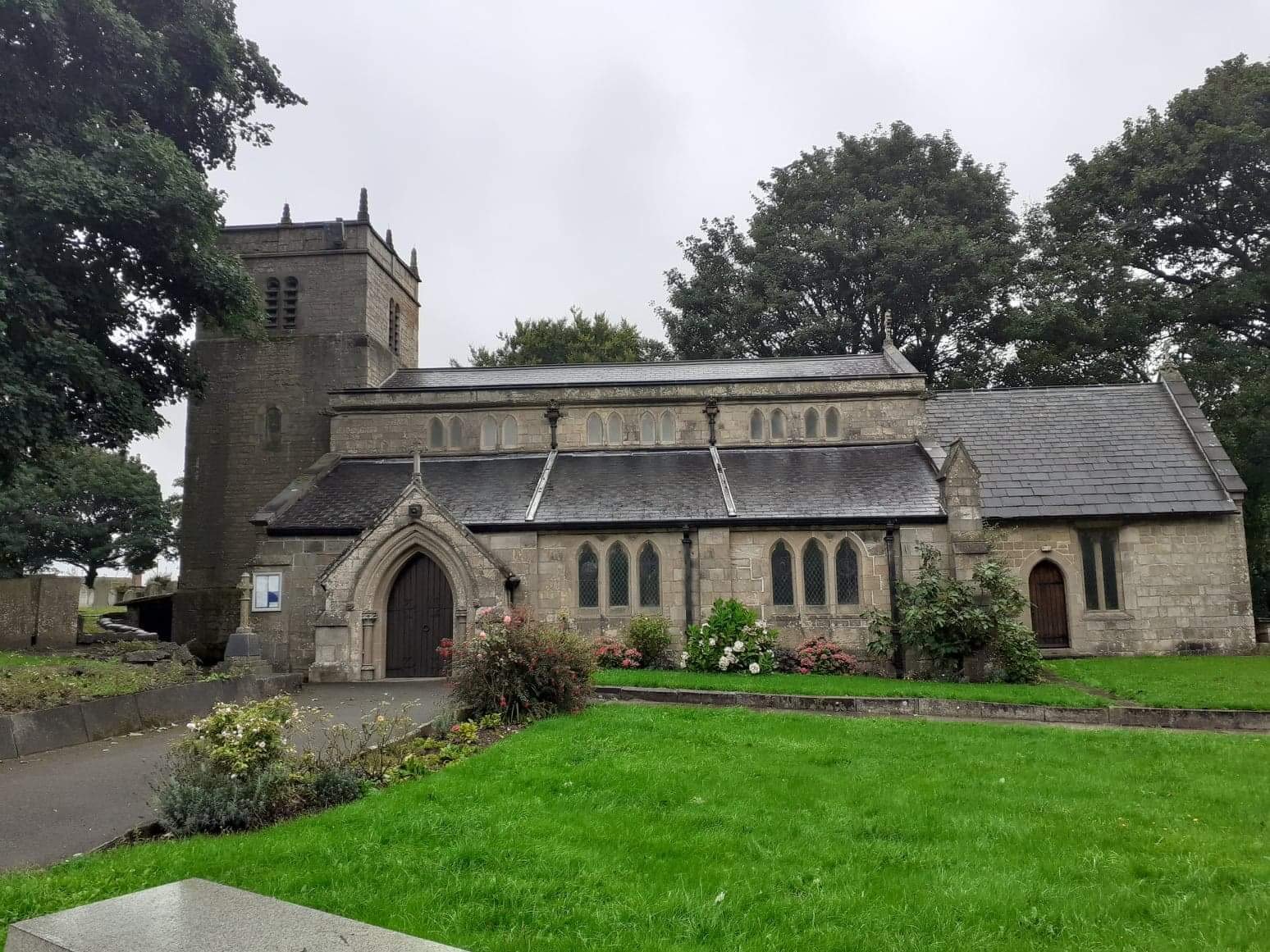
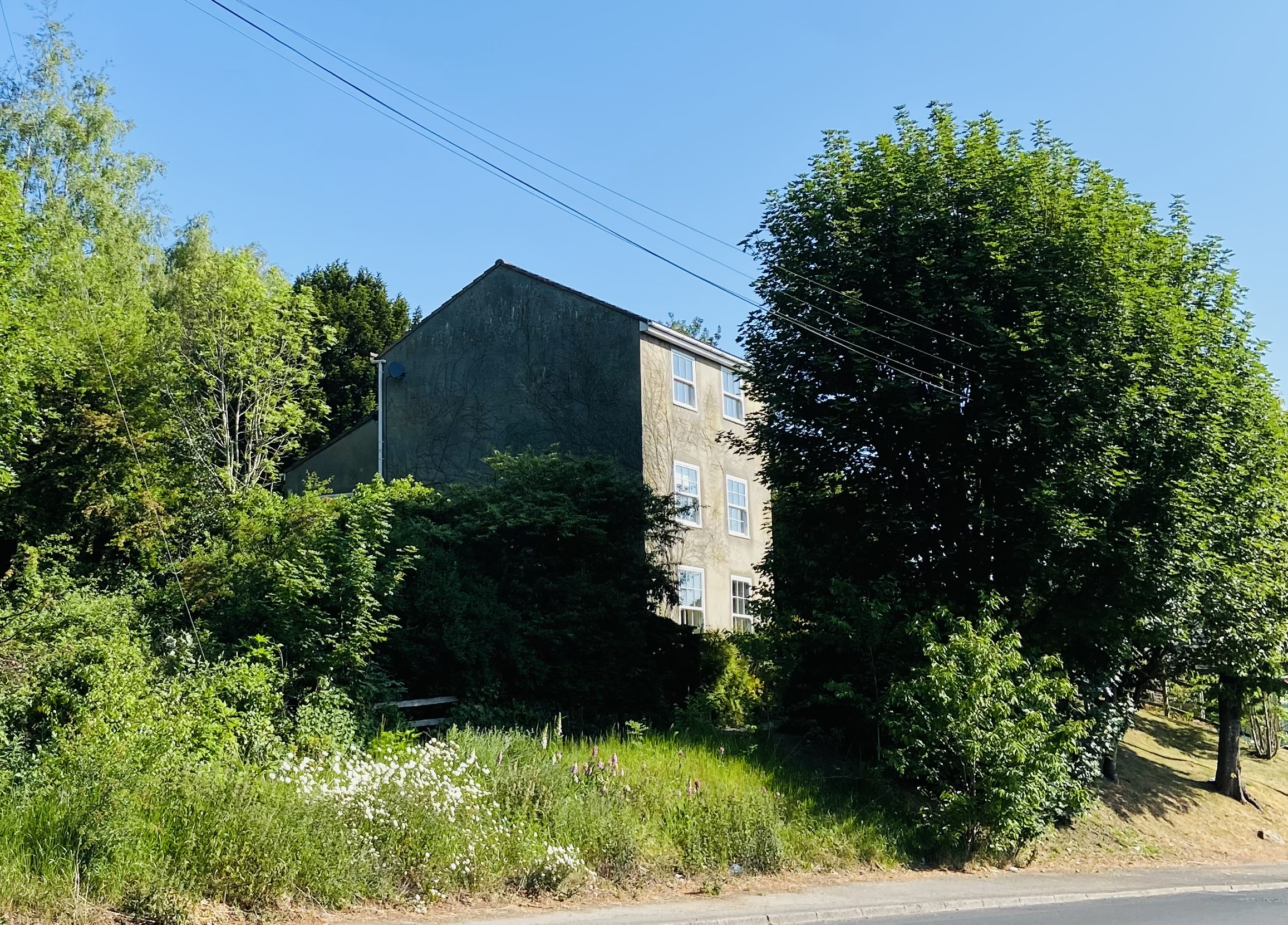
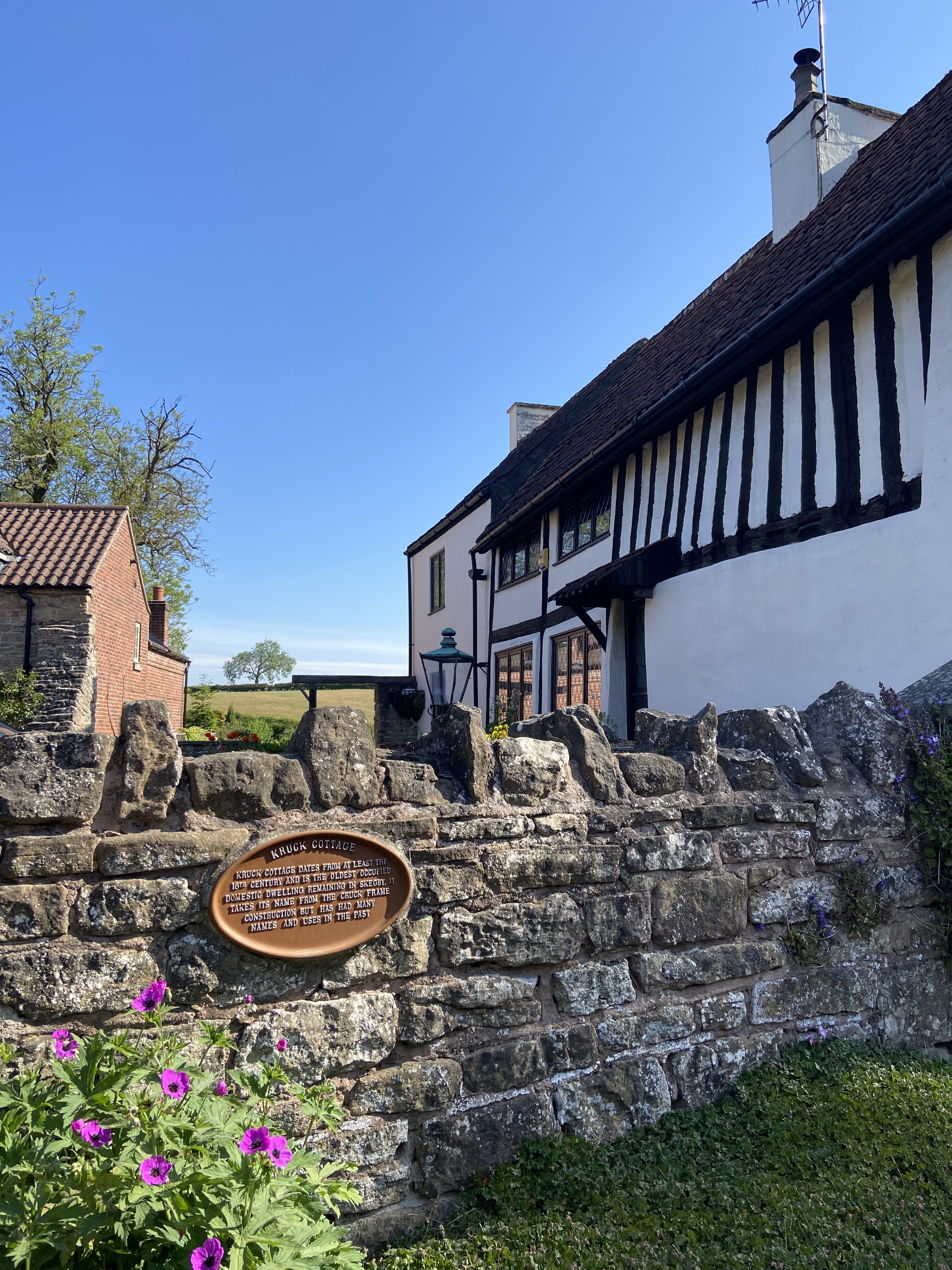
- St Andrew’s Church Quaker House Kruck Cottage

- Location within Nottinghamshire
- OS grid reference: SK492610
- District: Ashfield
- Shire county: Nottinghamshire
- Region: East Midlands
- Country: England
- Sovereign state: United Kingdom
- Post town: Sutton-in-Ashfield
- Postcode district: NG17
- Dialling code: 01623
- Police: Nottinghamshire
- Fire: Nottinghamshire
- Ambulance: East Midlands
- UK Parliament: Ashfield

Skegby is a village in the Ashfield district of Nottinghamshire, England. It lies on the B6014 road, two miles west of Mansfield and one mile north of Sutton-in-Ashfield, close to Stanton Hill. Skegby sits on both sides of a deep valley near the source of the River Meden.

== Toponymy ==
Skegby took the name of 'Skeggi' which was the name of a Viking settler. His name means the ("bearded one"). The second element of the name is Danish and can mean a farmstead or village.

== History ==
Skegby is an ancient parish. It covered about 1,433 acres and included the then hamlet of Stanton Hill. In 1931 the parish had a population of 6,519. It was in Skegby Rural District. On 1 April 1935 the parish was abolished and merged with Sutton in Ashfield and became part of Sutton in Ashfield Urban District. Sutton in Ashfield Urban District was in turn abolished in 1974 to become part of the new district of Ashfield.

Skegby is mentioned in the Domesday Book in 1086 as the Wapentake of Broxtow. It was the land of Roger of Bully and a "a berewick of the King's manor at Mansfield". Skegby like Mansfield and Sutton in Ashfield were in the land of Edward the Confessor and later William the Conqueror in 1066.

=== Skegby Manor House ===
Skegby manor house (which is now in ruins) is located on Mansfield Road. In 1223 Godfrey Spigurnal became Lord of the Manor of Skegby. His descendants held the estate until 1334 when Elizabeth Spigurnal, who married Thomas Gobion, disposed of it to Richard Pensax. His descendant passed it to Percival Lindley in 1450 which was the beginning of the three hundred-year tenure of the Lindley family as Lords of the Manor. The estate passed to John Dodsley in 1820 and the Dodsley family remained in Skegby until the 1930s.

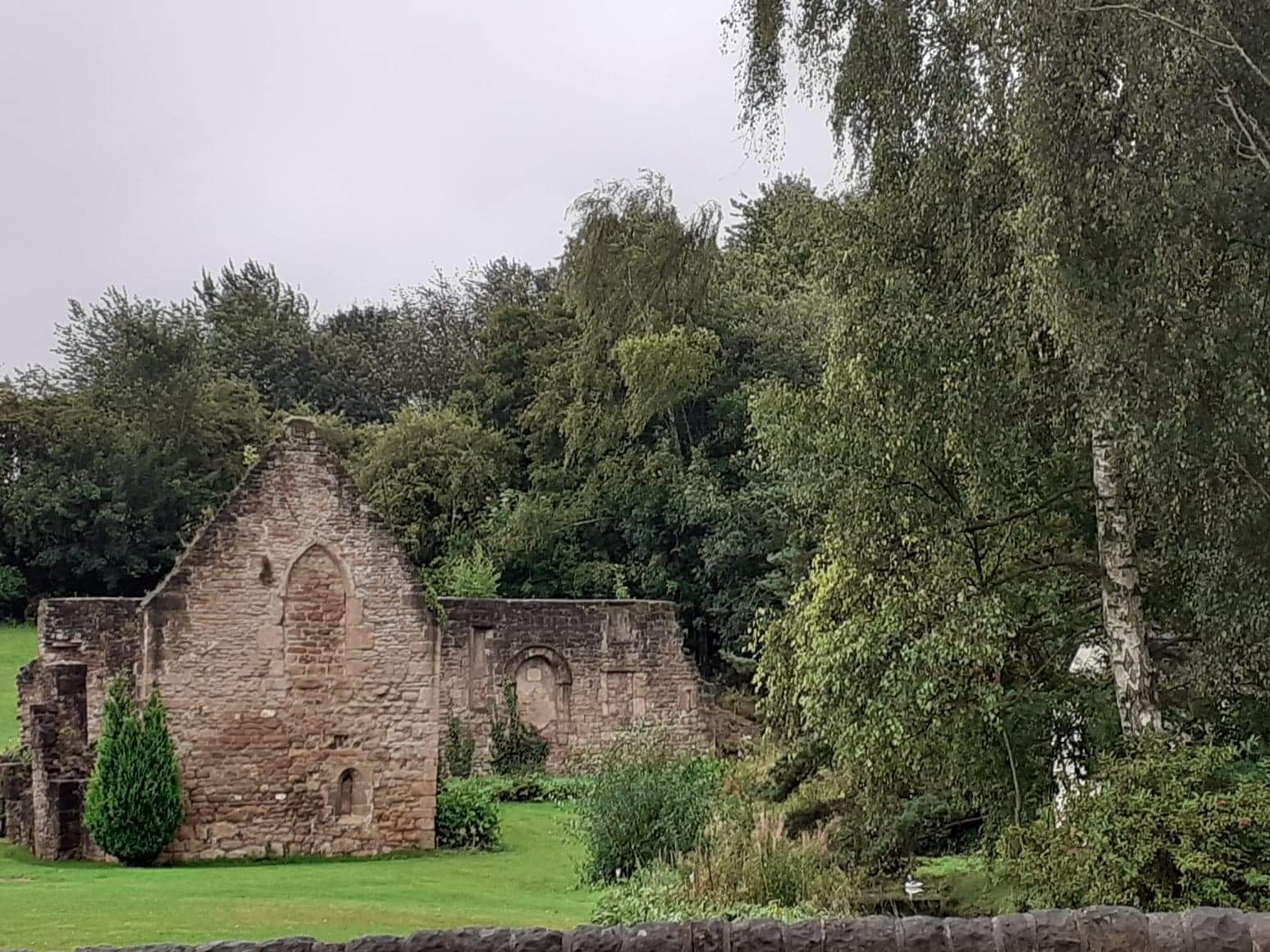
The Old Manor, Skegby

=== Quaker House ===
The Quaker House was the home of Elizabeth Hooton, one of earliest preachers of the Quakers movement in the United Kingdom. It is here that Elizabeth met George Fox founder of the Quakers in 1647. Elizabeth is mentioned in George Fox’s journal as being the first convert and preacher of Quakerism. She was also the first woman Quaker. George Fox stated in his journal ‘then it was upon me that we should have a meeting at Skegby at Elizabeth Hooton’s house and we had her there’. George was referring to a woman who needed heeling.

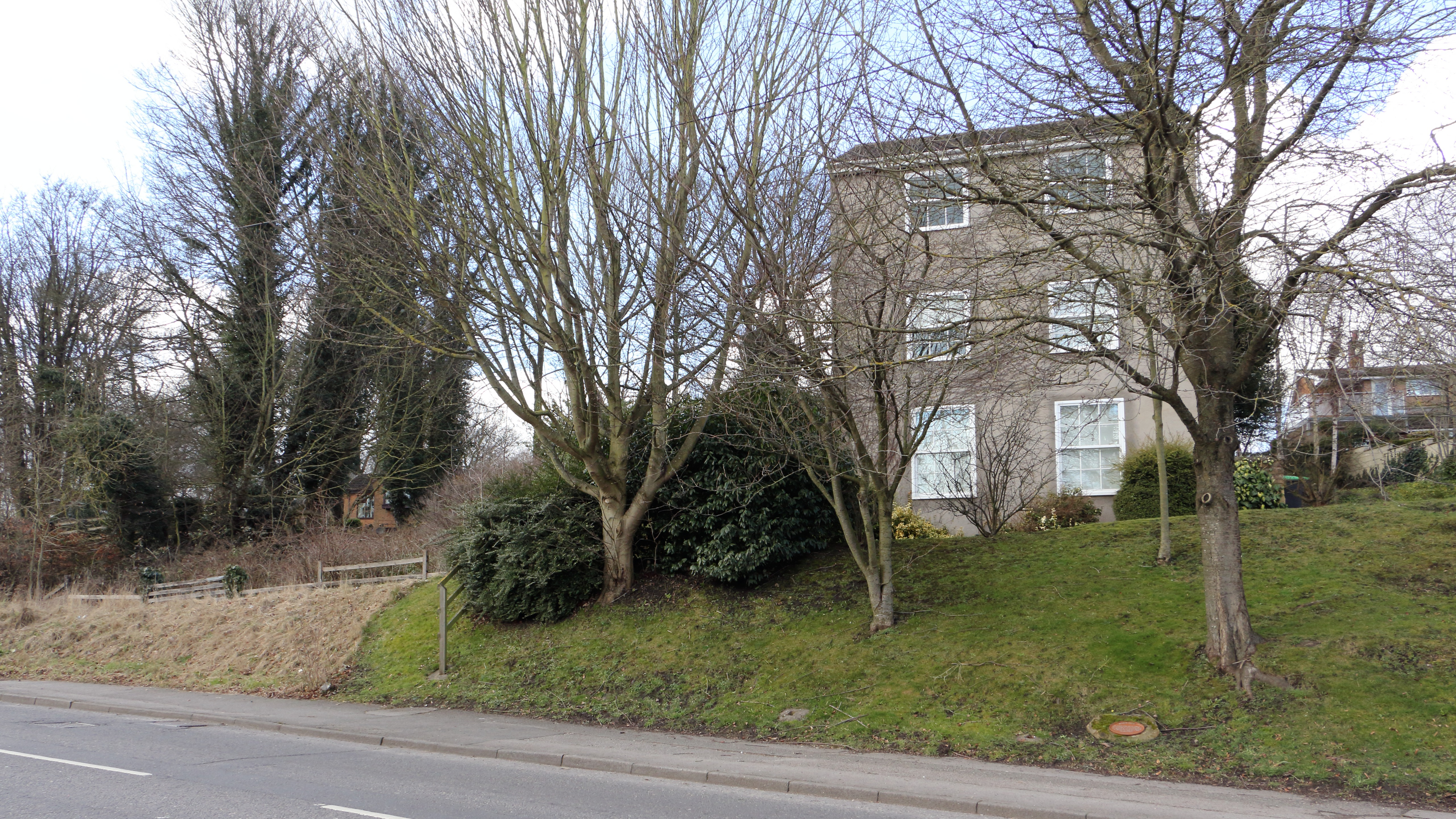
Quaker House, the former home of Elizabeth Hooton

=== St Andrew’s Church ===
The Anglican church was built in the Norman period, prior to 1571 and was formerly a chapelry to Mansfield. The church was restored and enlarged in 1870. In 1844 a Wesleyan Methodist chapel was built, with a "Free Church" being built in 1863. In 1865 a National School for both boys and girls was built in Skegby village and a Baptist chapel was built in 1877.

=== Skegby Hall ===
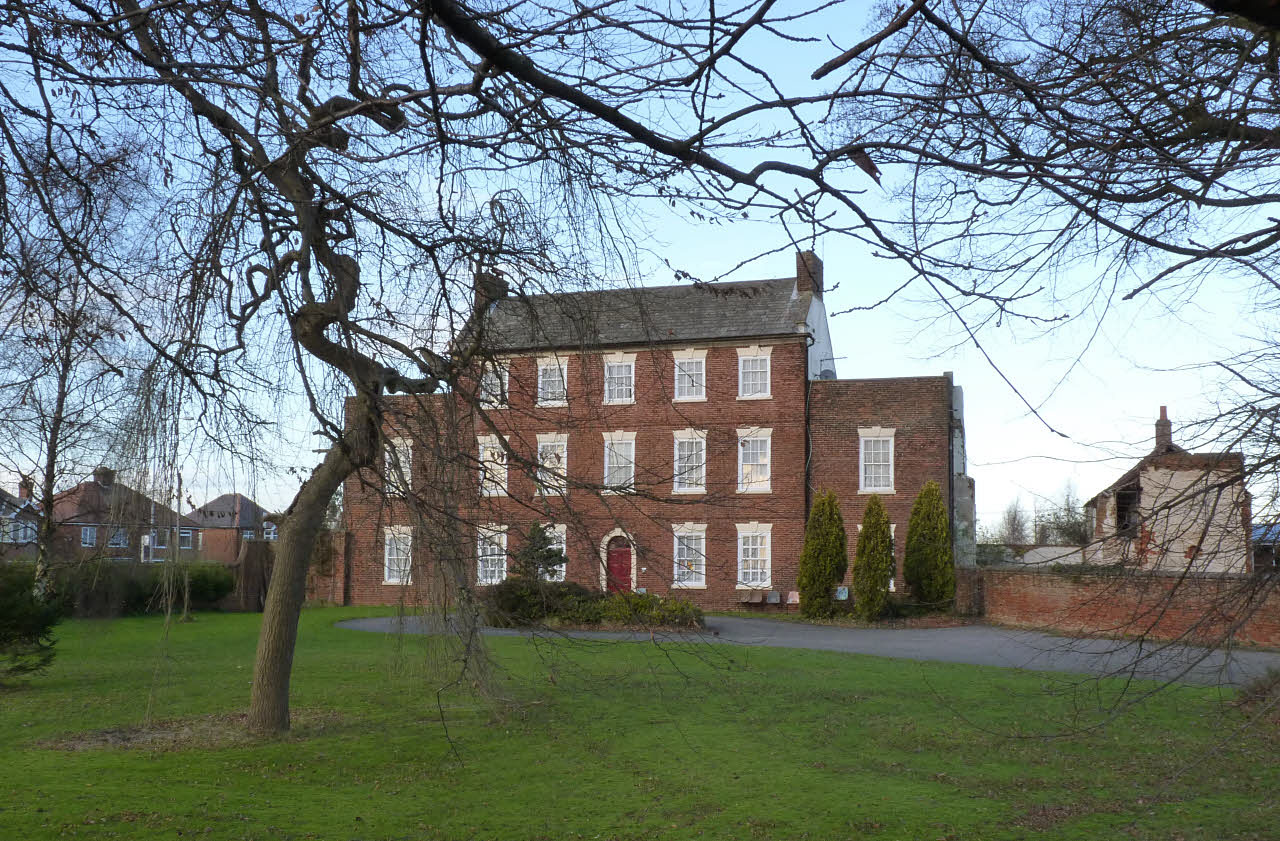
Skegby Hall

Skegby Hall was built for the Lindley family in 1720. It was Grade II listed in 1988. After private residential ownership, it was used from the late 1940s as an approved school for boys, later becoming a care home with education. It was converted into residential flatlets in 1992. It gained notoriety in the 2000s after multiple allegations of child abuse, with police investigations Daybreak, launched in 2010, followed by Xeres in 2014.

The last Manorial Court was held in Skegby Hall on 25 April 1924. The current Lord of the Manor is Dominic Vernon Dodsley Williams, who currently resides in Carmarthenshire.

Francis White's "Directory of Nottinghamshire," of 1853 tells us that Skegby had "an extensive coal mine, and several limestone quarries and kilns" and that in the 1800s "stocking-making was a common occupation." According to White, Skegby celebrated its Village Feast on the Sunday after 10 July.

== Areas of interest ==
Several old buildings and features can be found in Skegby:

- The Pinfold on Mansfield Road, which dates from the 18th century.
- The Troughs on Old Road, which are thought to be over 200 years old.
- The 17th century Quaker House on Mansfield Road.
- The 16th century Kruck Cottage.
- Skegby Hall, which was built in 1720 on the site of a much earlier dwelling.
- The Skegby Heritage Trail, (not to be confused with the Skegby Trail), which takes in places of historical interest around the village of Skegby, including Skegby Hall Gardens (currently under restoration), and the Manor House, was launched in October 2009 by the Skegby Appreciation Society. The heritage trail included nine sites in Skegby, such as the 13th Century Skegby Manor House, 16th Century Kruck Cottage and the 17th Century Quaker House.

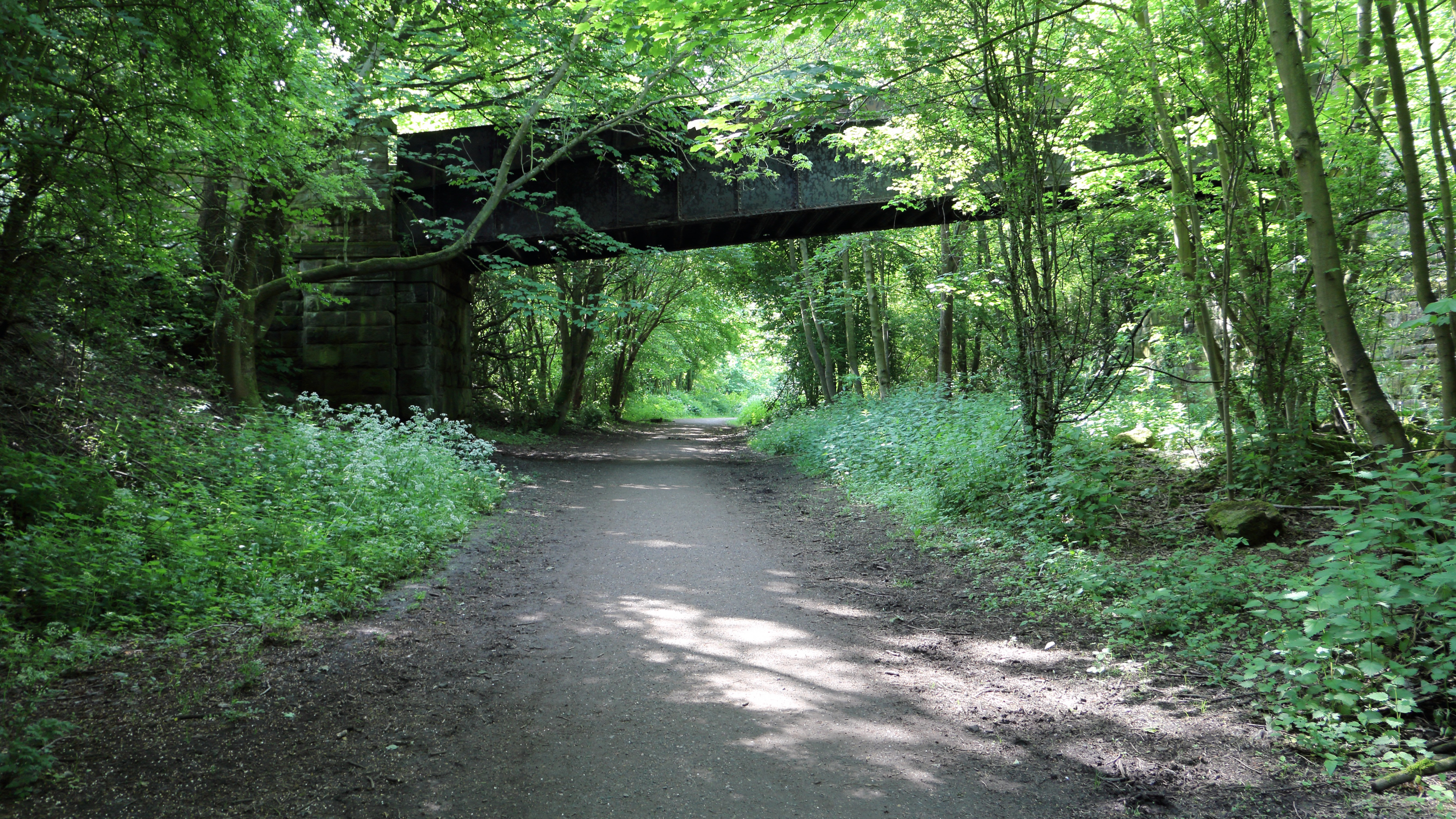
Skegby Trail

- The Teversal, Skegby and Silverhill Trails are former railway tracks used by cyclists as an off-road track and as a nature trail by walkers which can be accessed from Buttery Lane in Skegby and ends at Chesterfield Road in Pleasley. From this trail the Teversal Trails, which form part of the Pleasley Trails Network may be accessed via the Link Trail between Skegby and Teversal.

== Modern Skegby ==
Skegby has a number of small shops, off-licences, take away food outlets, hair salons and a petrol station. Other amenities which can be found in Skegby include a small library which is shared with the nearby village of Stanton Hill and Skegby Family Surgery and Pharmacy.

There are three public houses in Skegby: the Forest Tavern and the Rifle Volunteer, both on Forest Road and the Fox & Crown on Dalestorth Road. The Maypole on Dawgates Lane closed in June 2023 and the new owners plan to convert it into a residential dwelling. The Triple S Snooker and Social Club is on Mansfield Road.

== Schools ==
Skegby has three primary schools: Healdswood Infant and Nursery School on Barker Avenue, Skegby Junior Academy on Ash Grove and St. Andrew's C of E Primary School on Mansfield Road. St. Andrew's C of E Primary School was originally a National School built in 1865 on land donated by Lady Carnarvon and that year had 95 pupils under the tutelage of one schoolmaster.

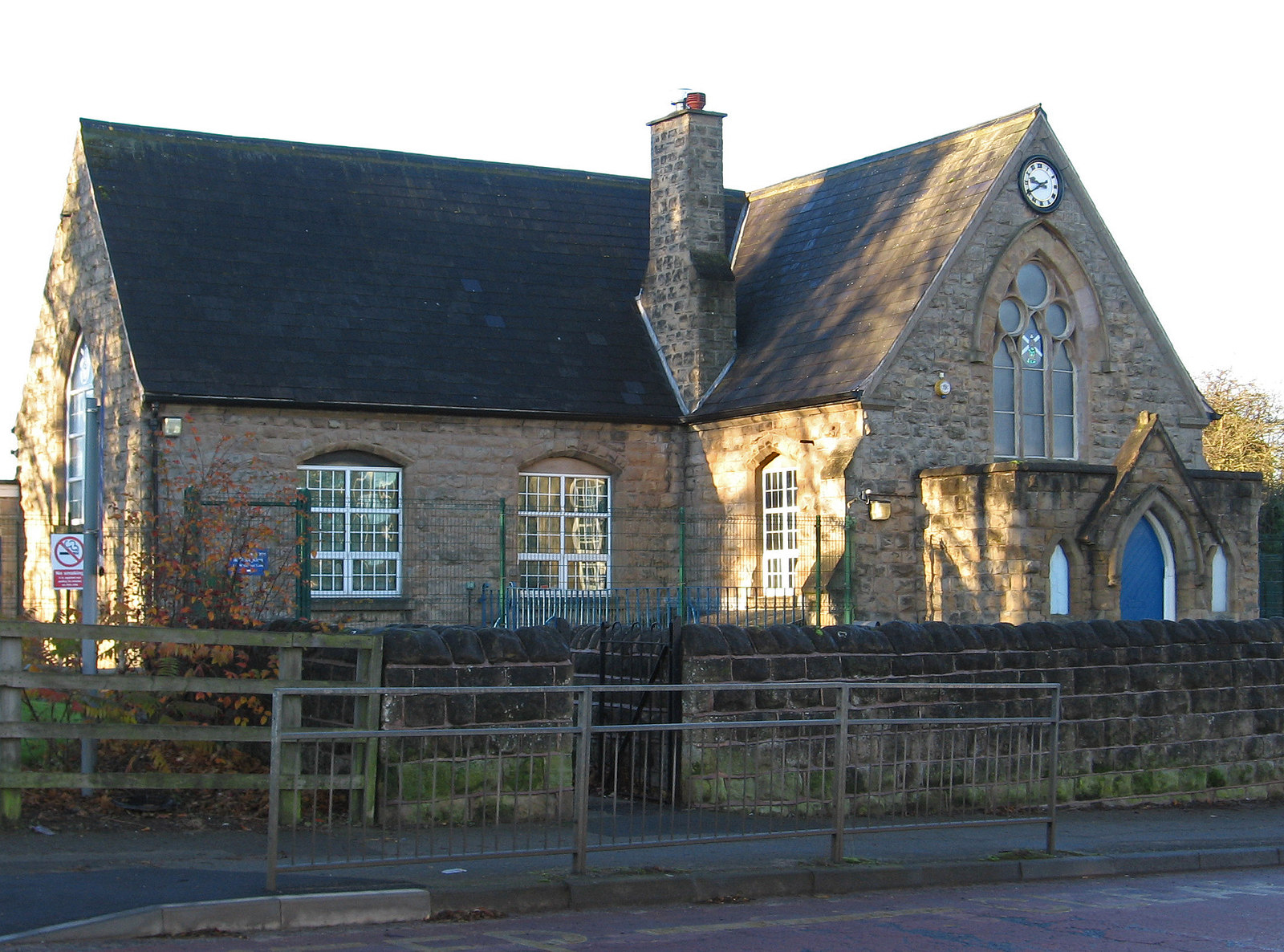
St Andrews C of E School

== Churches ==
St Andrew's Church is the Church of England parish church. Skegby Methodist Church is on Mansfield Road.

== See also ==
- Listed buildings in Skegby
