= Listed buildings in Skegby =

Skegby is a village in the Ashfield district of Nottinghamshire, England. The village and its surrounding area contain ten listed buildings that are recorded in the National Heritage List for England. All the listed buildings are designated at Grade II, the lowest of the three grades, which is applied to "buildings of national importance and special interest". The listed buildings consist of houses, a church, a pinfold, and two war memorials.

== Buildings ==
Name and location	Photograph	Date	Notes	Grade
St Andrew's Church; 53.14368°N 1.26510°W		13th century	The oldest part of the church is the tower, the body of the church having been restored or rebuilt, partly because of subsidence. It is built in stone with roofs of lead and slate, and consists of a nave with a clerestory, north and south aisles, a south porch, a chancel, a vestry and a west tower. The tower has two stages, it is unbuttressed, and has a chamfered string course, an eaves band, and a coped parapet with the remains of eight pinnacles. In the bottom stage are round-headed windows, and the upper stage has four round-headed bell openings.	II
Skegby Manor House; 53.14352°N 1.25991°W		1207	The manor house which has been altered through the centuries is now a ruin. It is in stone, and parts of the walls have survived. The north wall has a gable, and contains chamfered windows, a round-headed doorway with shafts, imposts and a hood mould, another doorway and a slit opening.	II
Kruck Cottage; 53.14387°N 1.25760°W		16th century	A farmhouse, later a private house, it is timber framed with some close studding, partly exposed and partly rendered, and it has a pantile roof. There are two storeys and four unequal bays. The doorway has a pantiled hood, the windows are mainly casements, and at the rear is a gabled dormer.	II
Manor Farm Cottage; 53.14383°N 1.25467°W		Late 17th century	A farmhouse, later a private house, it is in stone on a chamfered plinth, and has a pantile roof with coped gables, kneelers and finials. There are two storeys and attics, and three bays. In the centre is a doorway, and the windows are mullioned casements, most with hood moulds, continuous in the ground floor.	II
Skegby Hall; 53.14282°N 1.26376°W		1720	A country house, later extended and used for other purposes, it is in brick on a chamfered plinth, with stone dressings, rusticated quoins, an eaves band, and a coped parapet. There are two storeys and attics, a square plan with fronts of five bays, and later additions. Semicircular steps lead to a doorway that has a pediment, and the windows are sashes with rusticated lintels and keystones.	II
Skegby Pinfold; 53.14381°N 1.26150°W		Mid 18th century	The pinfold is an irregular square area enclosed by stone walls with flat coping, measuring about 5 metres (16 ft) on each side. On the west side is a large opening, the south side has a plaque, and the east side is on a buttressed plinth.	II
215 Mansfield Road; 53.14117°N 1.25237°W	—	Late 18th century	The house is in sandstone with a moulded eaves band, and a slate roof with coped gables. There are two storeys and three bays. The central doorway has pilasters, a fanlight, and an entablature hood. The windows are sashes, and at the rear is a tall stair window.	II
Dalestorth House, service wing and wall 53.14001°N 1.24305°W		Late 18th century	The house is in brick and stone, partly rendered, with stone dressings, floor bands, moulded stone and dentilled brick eaves, a coped parapet, and a roof of slate, tile, pantile and stone, with coped gables. There are three storeys, five bays, and flanking two-storey single-bay wings. In the centre is a round-arched doorway with a keystone. The windows on the front are sashes with splayed lintels and keystones. To the right is a coped brick boundary wall, a two-storey service wing, a two-storey three-bay stable, and a three-storey stair tower.	II
Stanton Hill War Memorial; 53.14204°N 1.27644°W		1920	The war memorial in the churchyard of All Saints' Church, Stanton Hill, to the south of the church, is in granite. It consists of an encircled cross on a tapering shaft on a plinth, base, and a platform. There is an octagonal plan, and the memorial is about 4 metres (13 ft) high. On the front of the shaft is a Christogram, and on the sides of the plinth are an inscription and the names of those lost in the First World War. In front of the base is a plaque with an inscription and the names of those lost in the Second World War.	II
Skegby war memorial 53.14358°N 1.26518°W		1922	The war memorial is in the churchyard of St Andrew's Church. It is in sandstone, and consists of a hexagonal, carved cross with wheel, on a square tapered plinth, on a two-stepped base and a raised platform. On the plinth are slate tablets with inscriptions and the names of those lost in the First World War.	II
