= St Andrew's Church, Skegby =

Coordinates: 53°08′37″N 01°15′54″W

St. Andrew's Church, Skegby
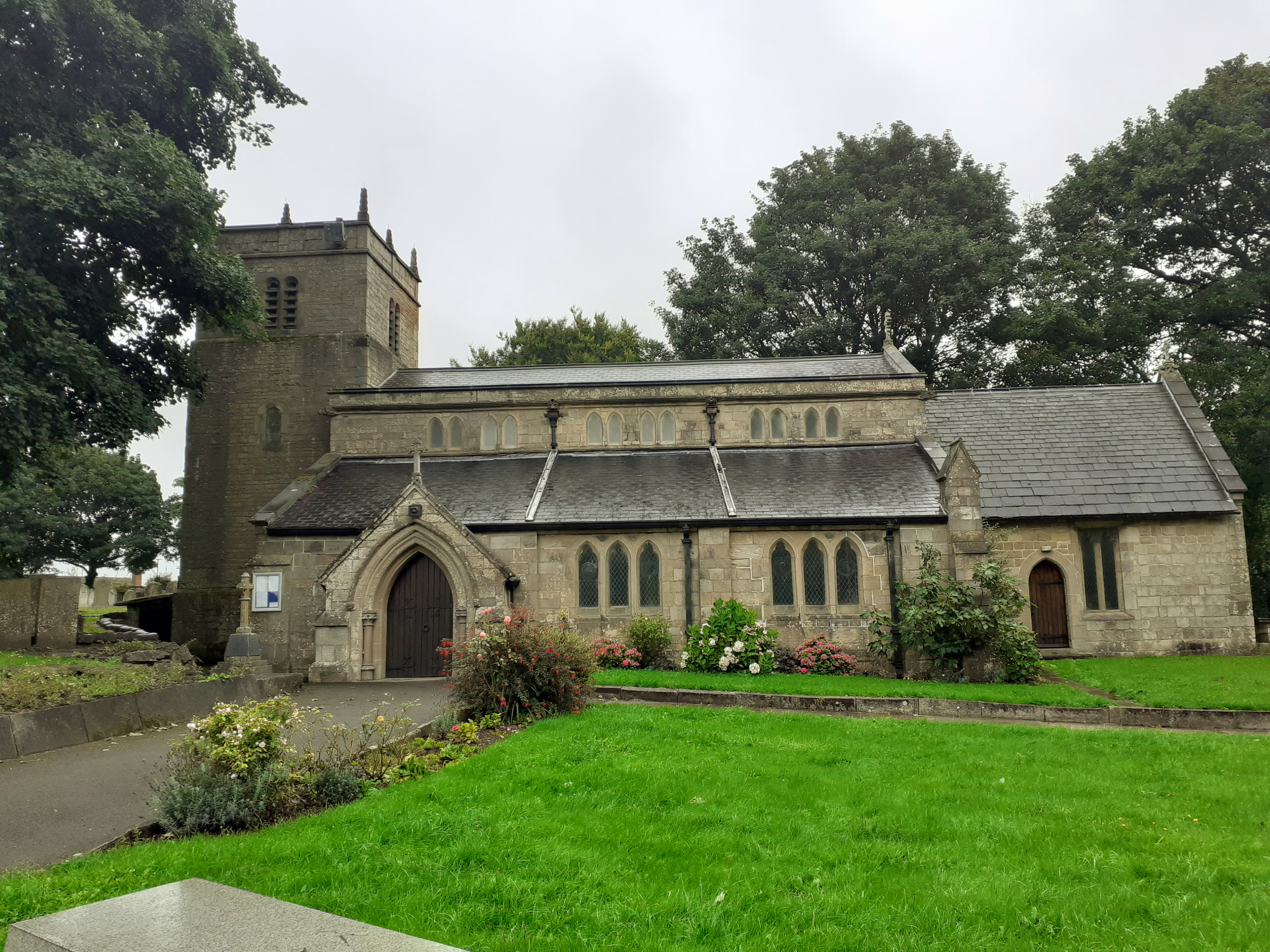
- St. Andrew's Church, Skegby
- Denomination: Church of England
- Churchmanship: Evangelical

History
- Dedication: St. Andrew

Administration
- Province: York
- Diocese: Southwell and Nottingham
- Parish: Skegby

Clergy
- Rector: Revd Dr Richard Kellett

St. Andrew's Church is a parish church in the Church of England in Skegby, Nottinghamshire. The church is Grade II listed by the Department for Digital, Culture, Media and Sport as it is a building of special architectural or historic interest.

The Skegby War Memorial, to the left of the entrance to the Church, is Grade II listed by the Department for Digital, Culture, Media and Sport as it is of special architectural or historic interest.

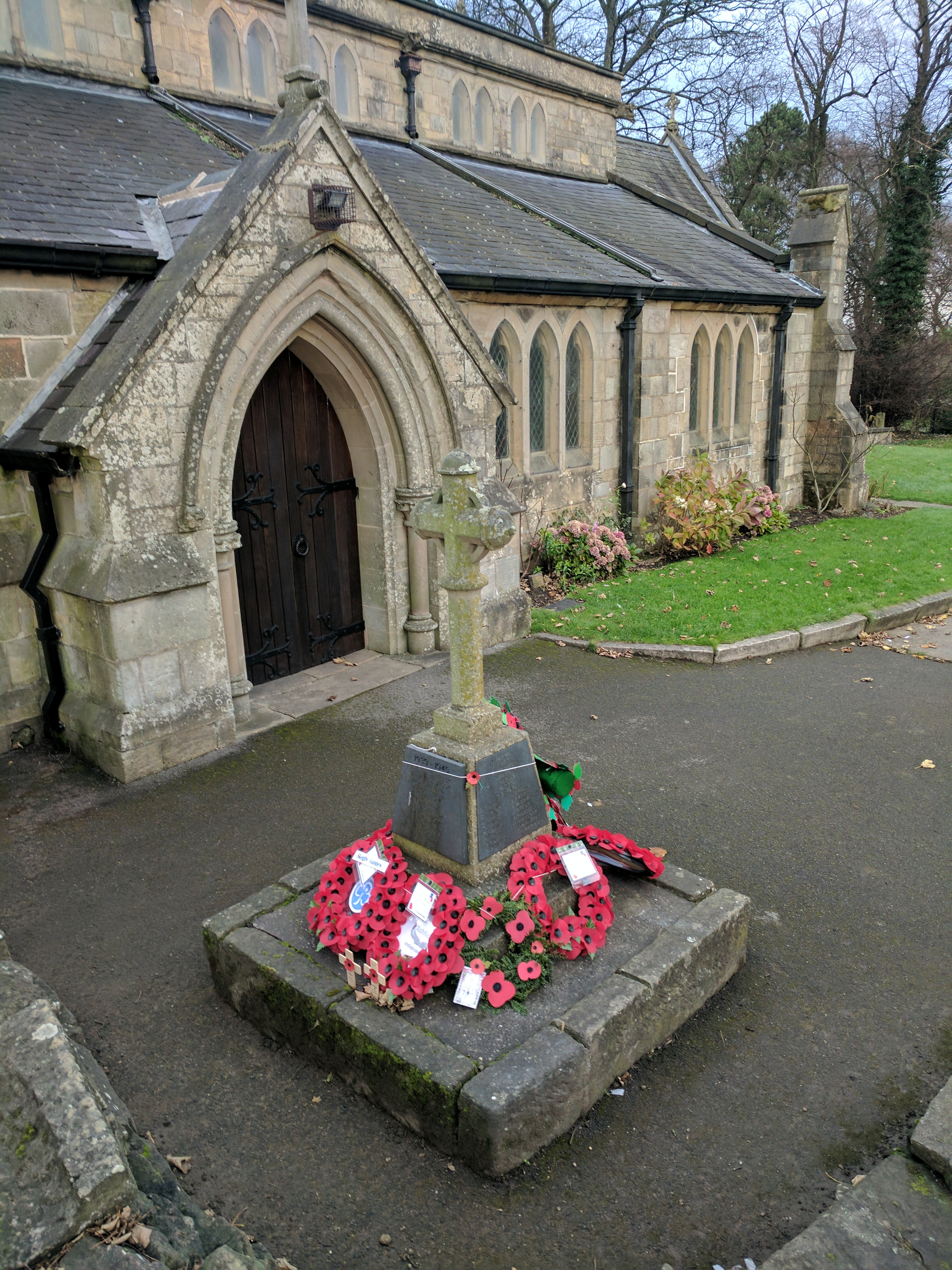
Skegby War Memorial, Near entrance to St Andrews Church (Grade II listed)

== History ==
The church is medieval, the north arcade dating from the 13th century It is set on a hill overlooking the village and is mentioned in the Domesday Book.

== Parish Structure ==
The church is in a group of parishes which includes

- St. Andrew's Church, Skegby
- All Saints' Church, Stanton on the Hill
- St. Katherine's Church, Teversal

== See also ==
- Listed buildings in Skegby

== Gallery ==
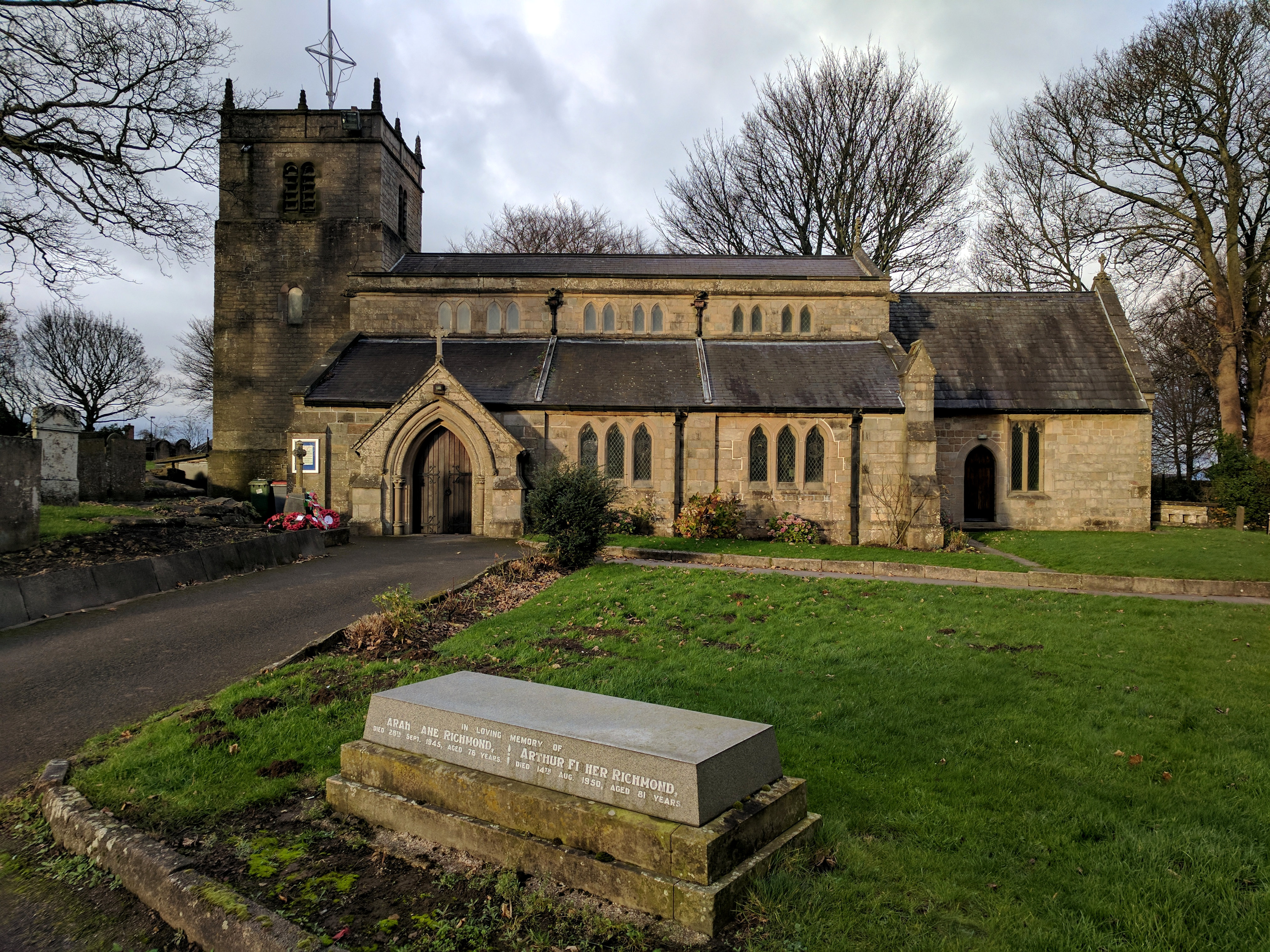
St. Andrew's Church, Skegby

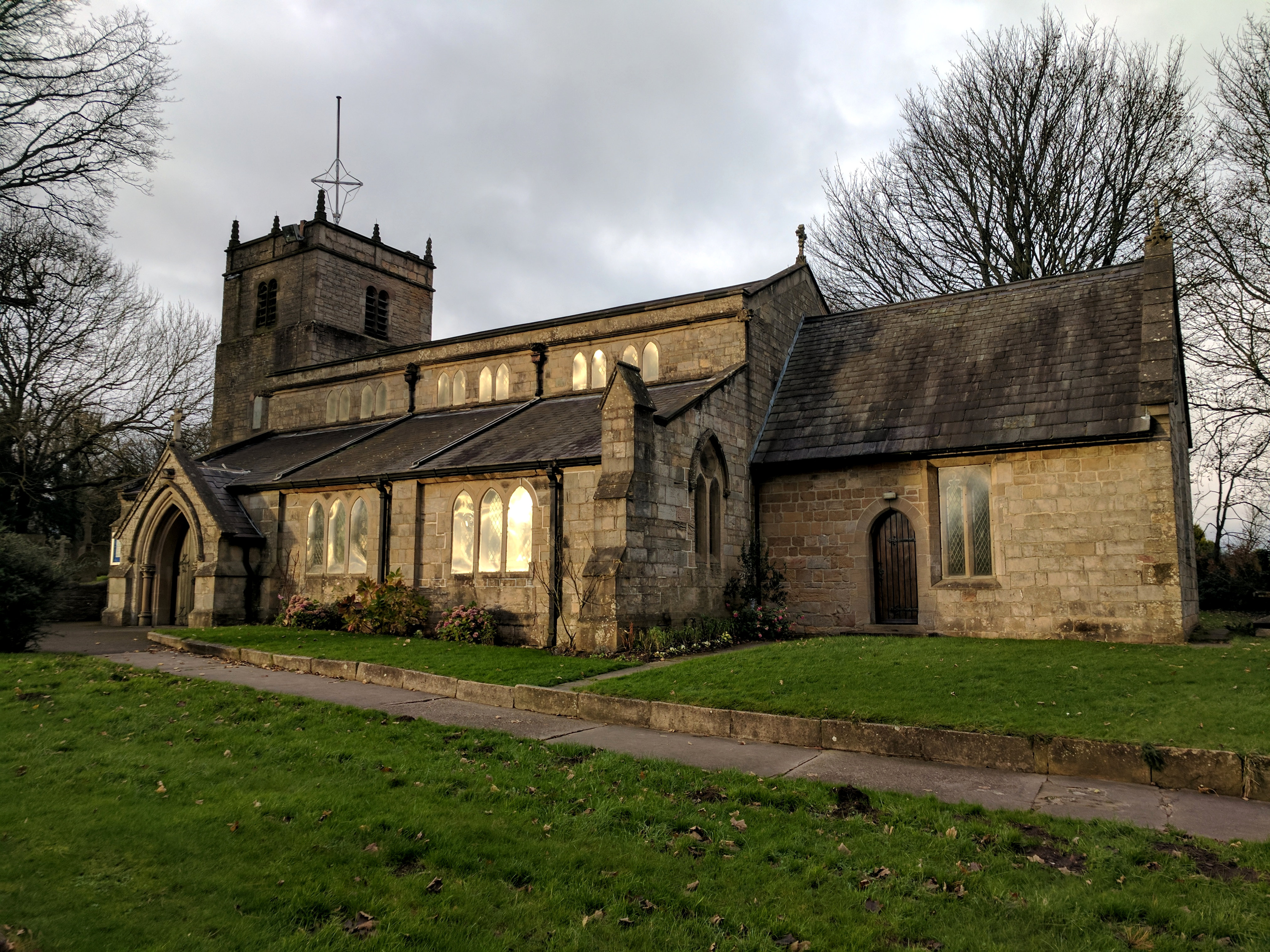
St. Andrew's Church, Skegby

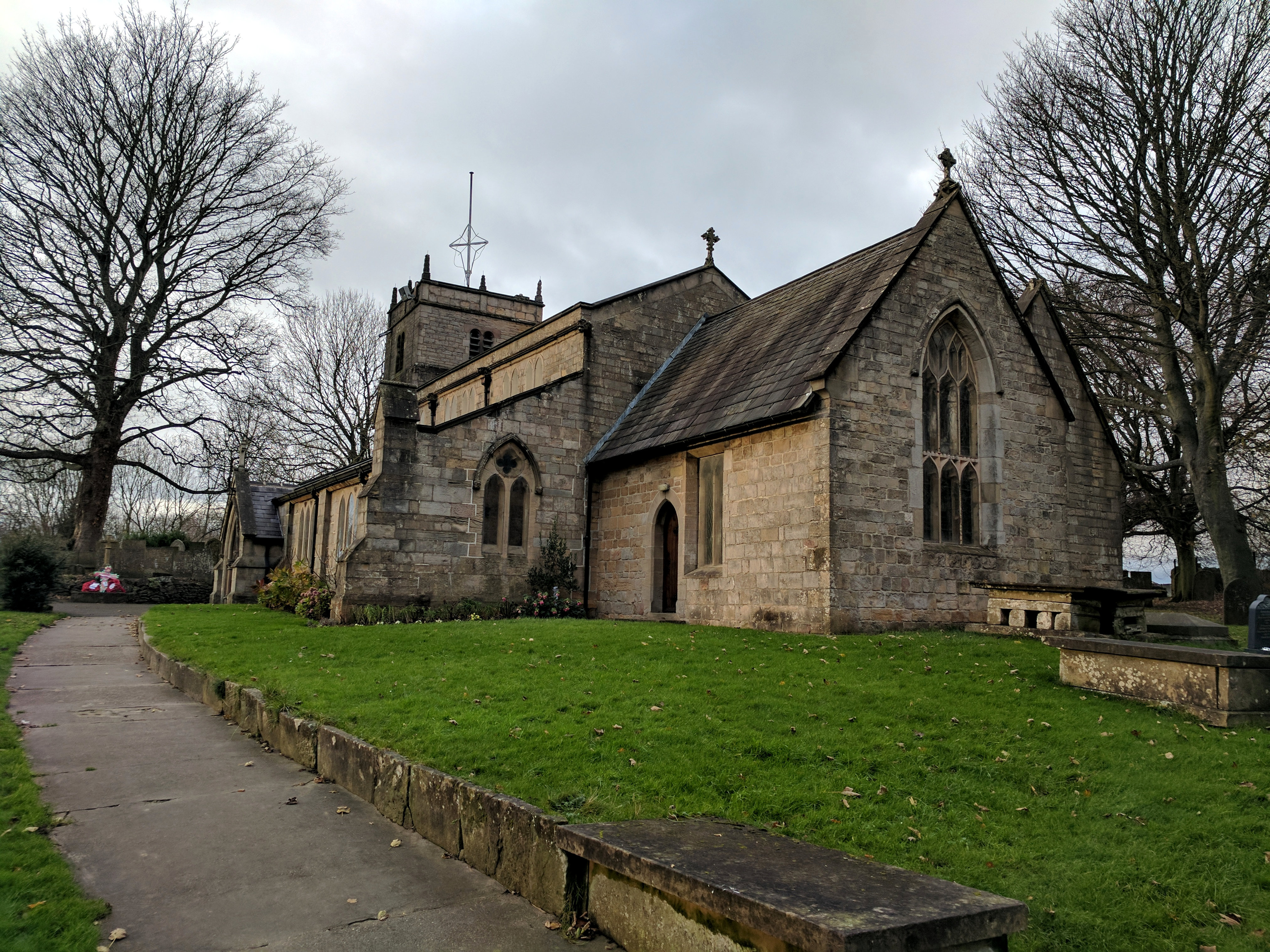
St. Andrew's Church, Skegby

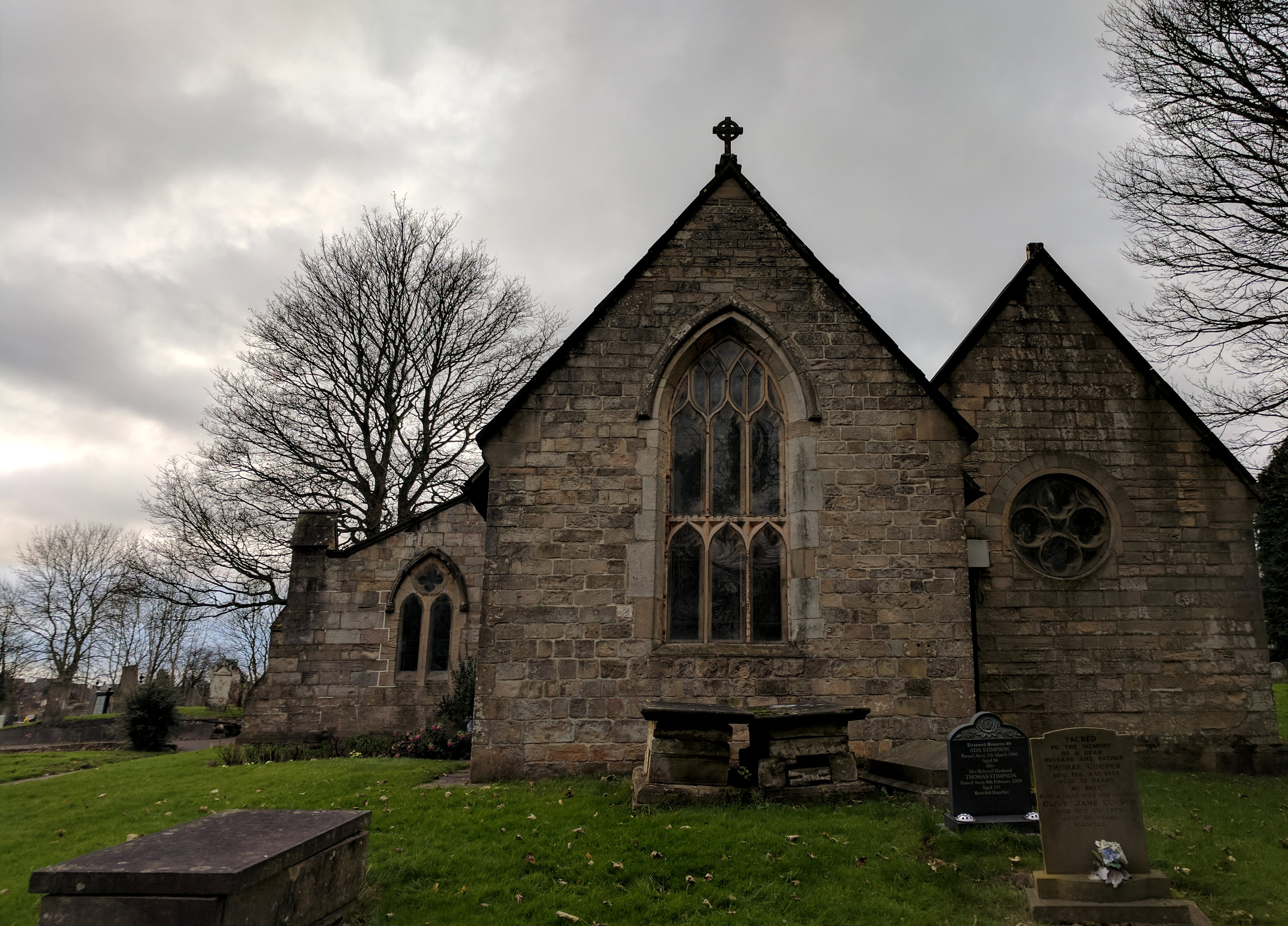
St. Andrew's Church, Skegby

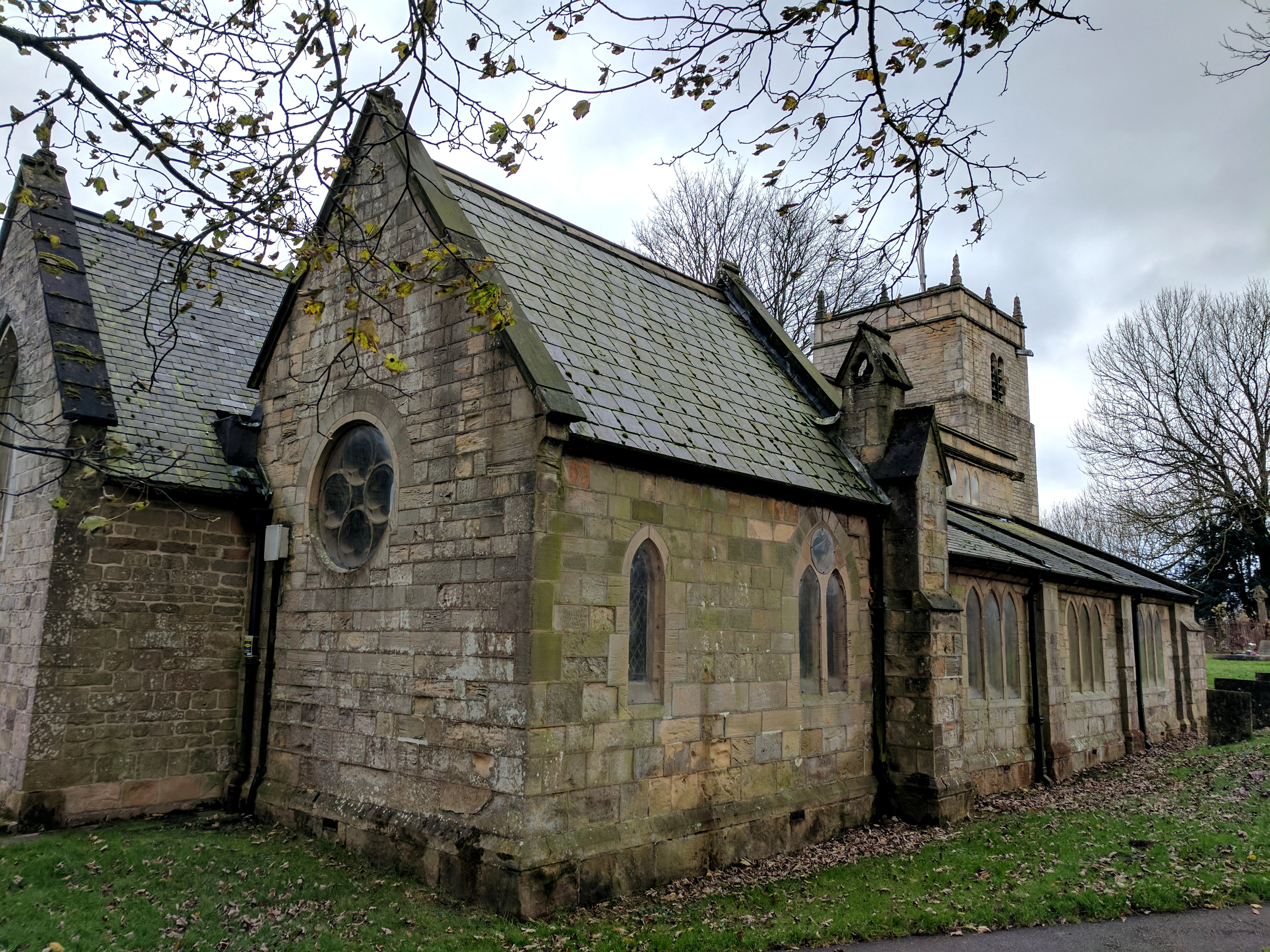
St. Andrew's Church, Skegby

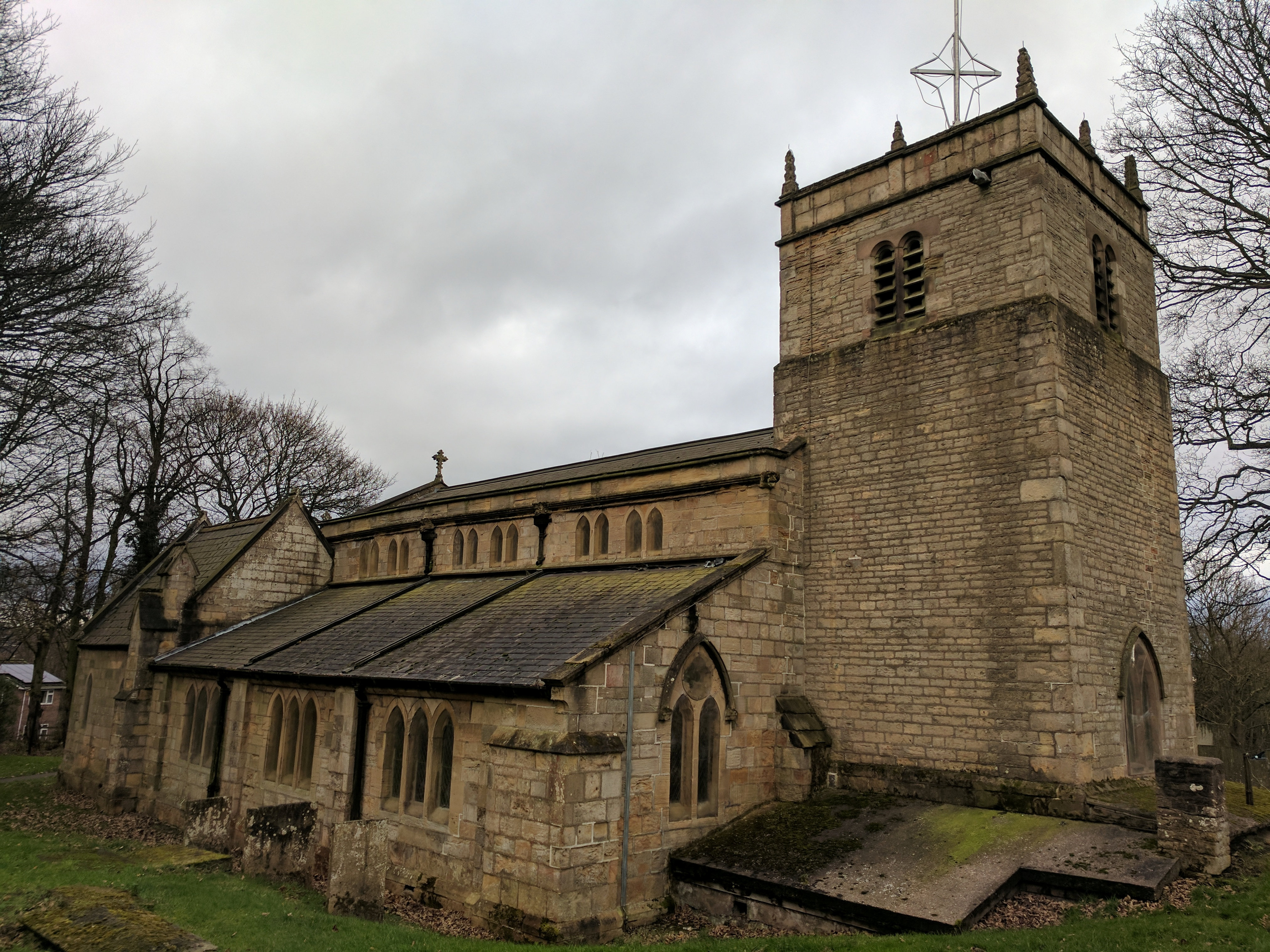
St. Andrew's Church, Skegby

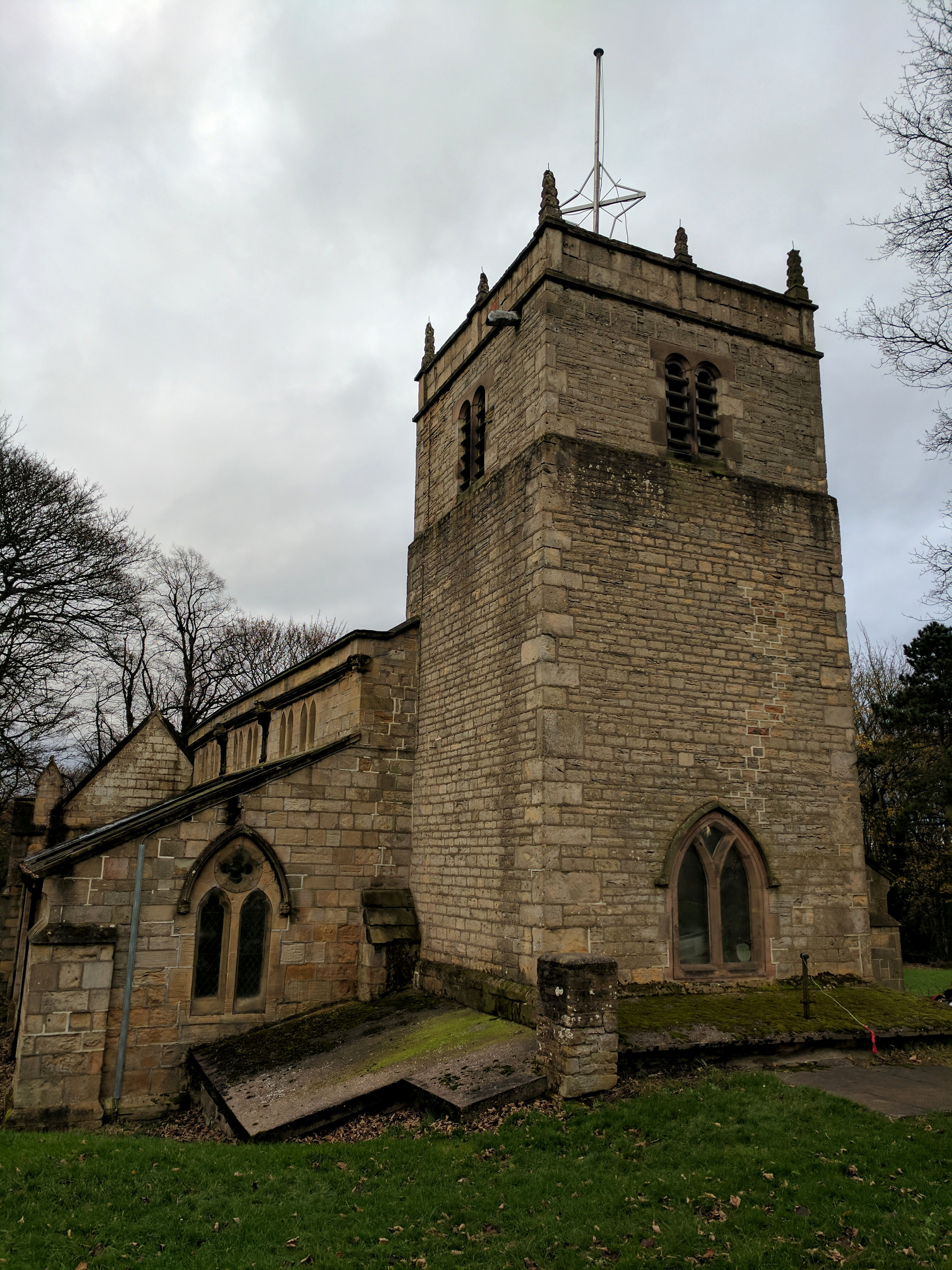
St. Andrew's Church, Skegby

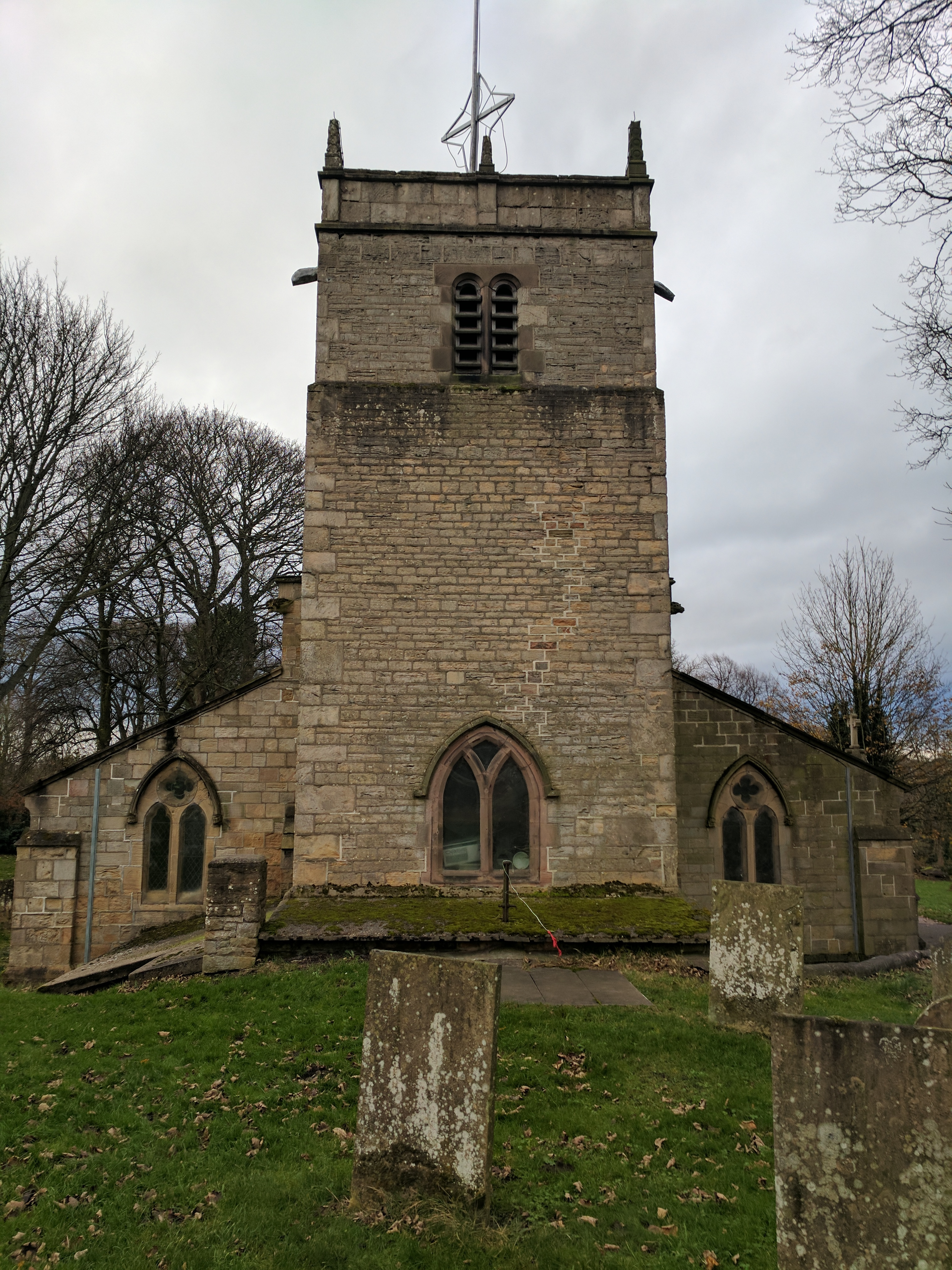
St. Andrew's Church, Skegby

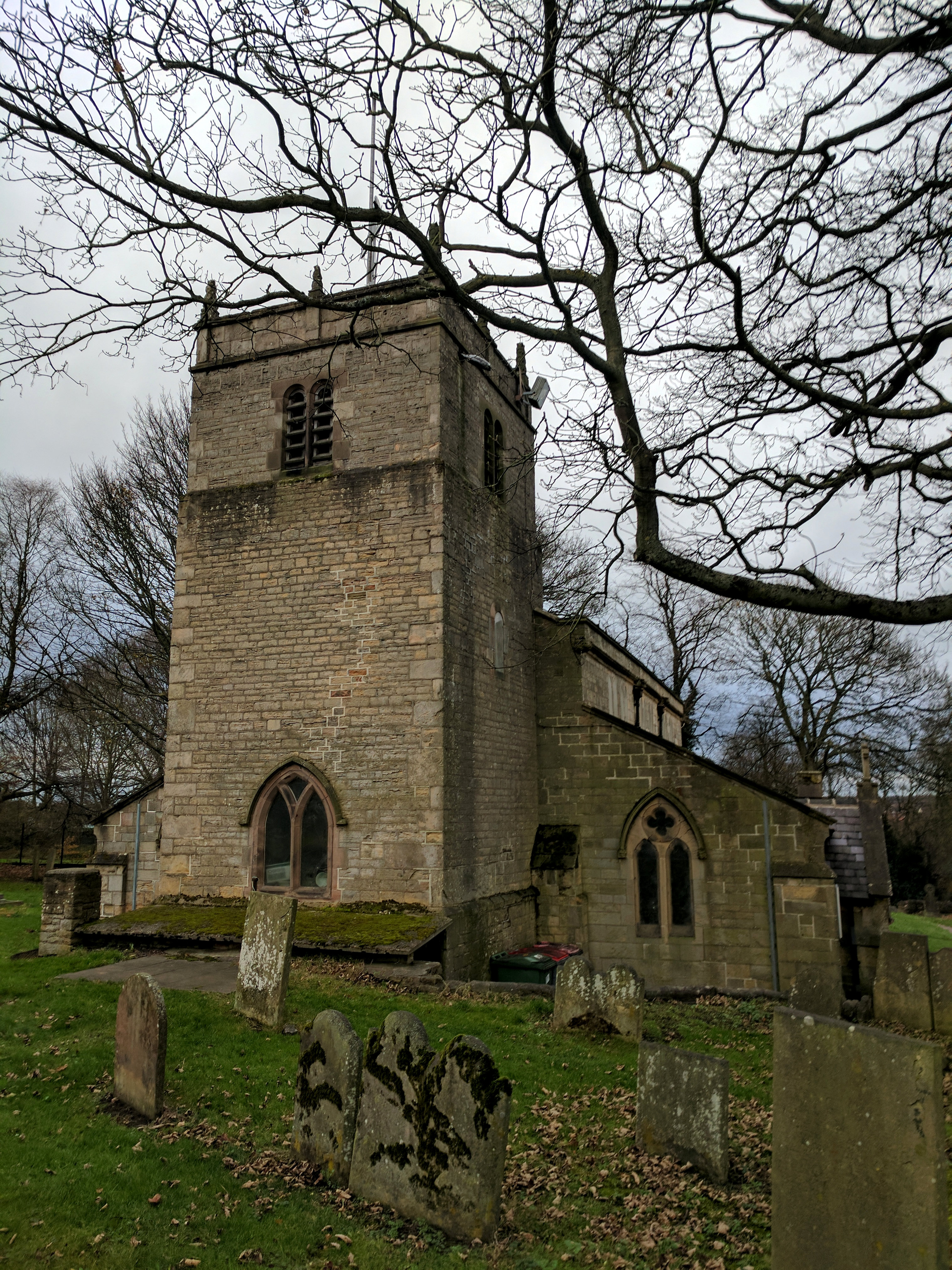
St. Andrew's Church, Skegby

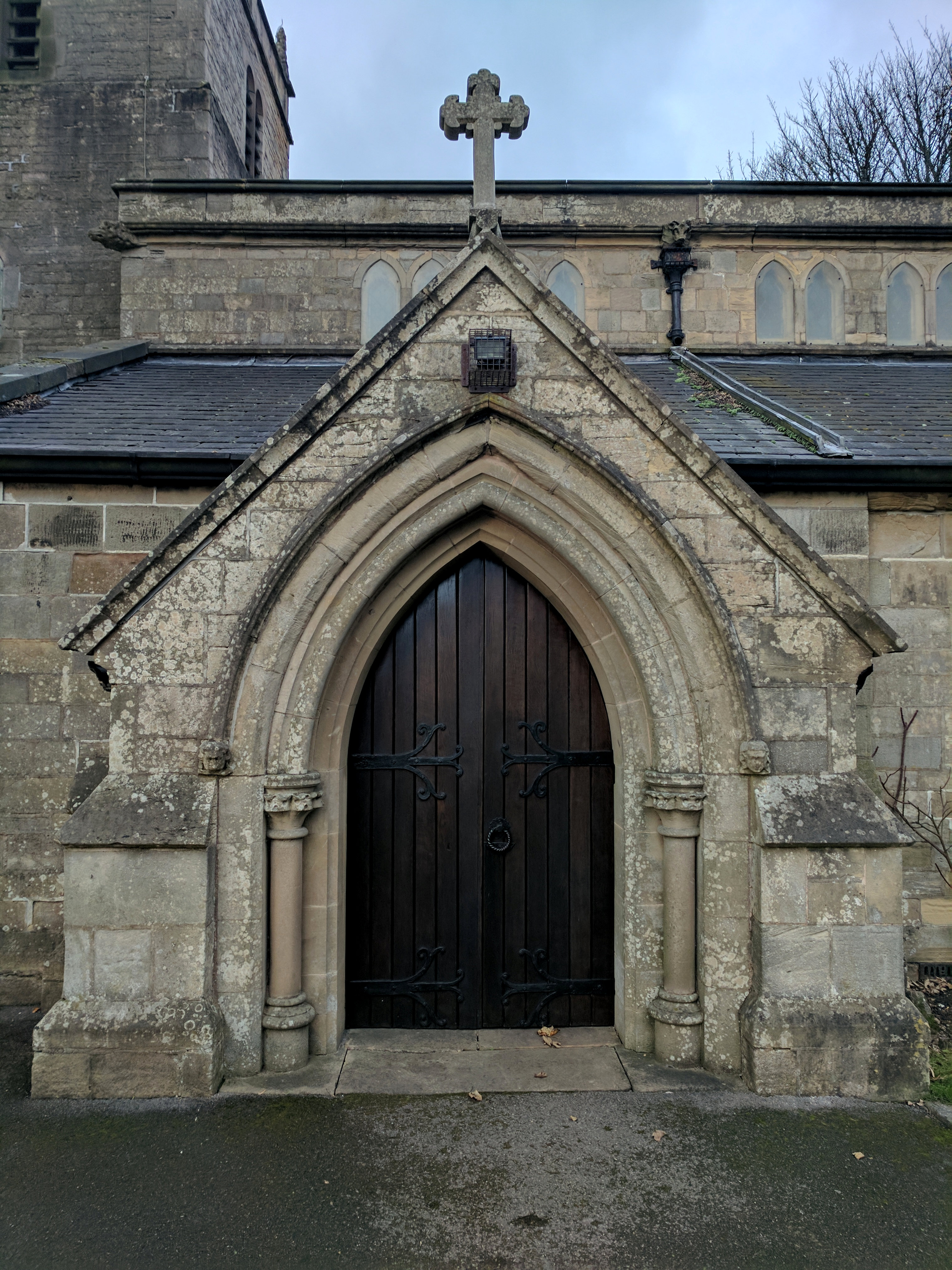
Entrance St. Andrew's Church, Skegby

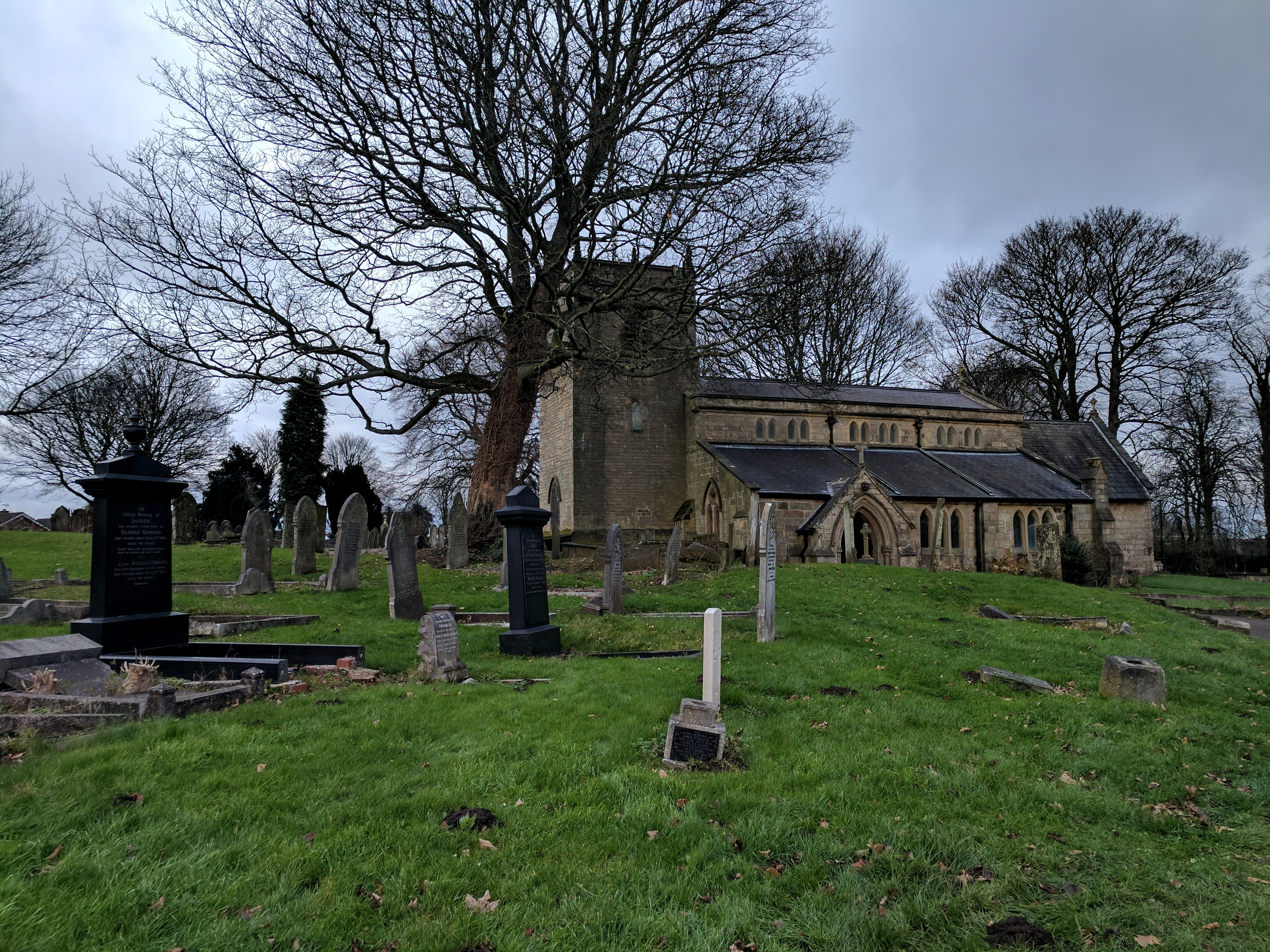
Churchyard of St. Andrew's Church, Skegby

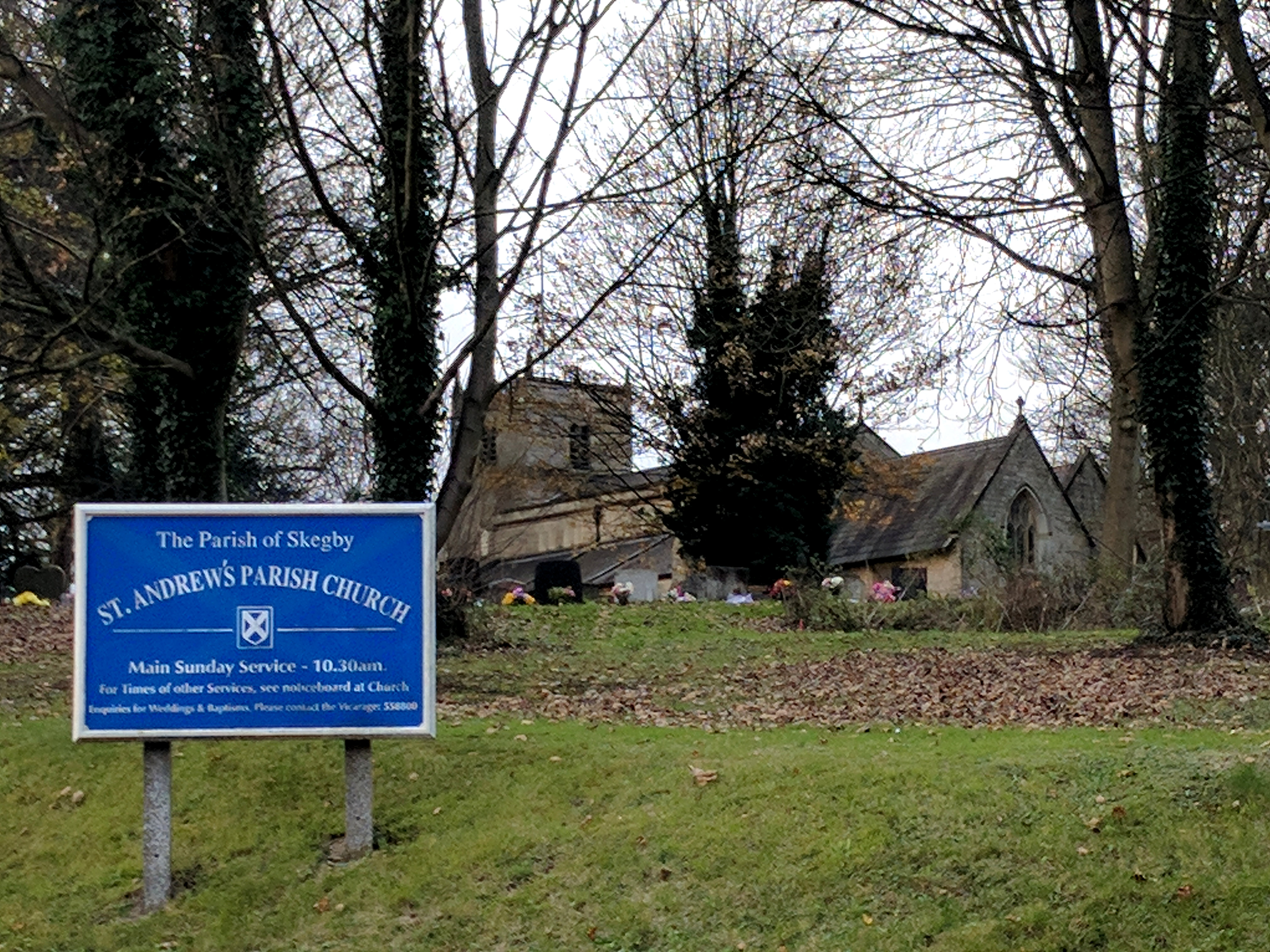
Church sign of St. Andrew's Church, Skegby

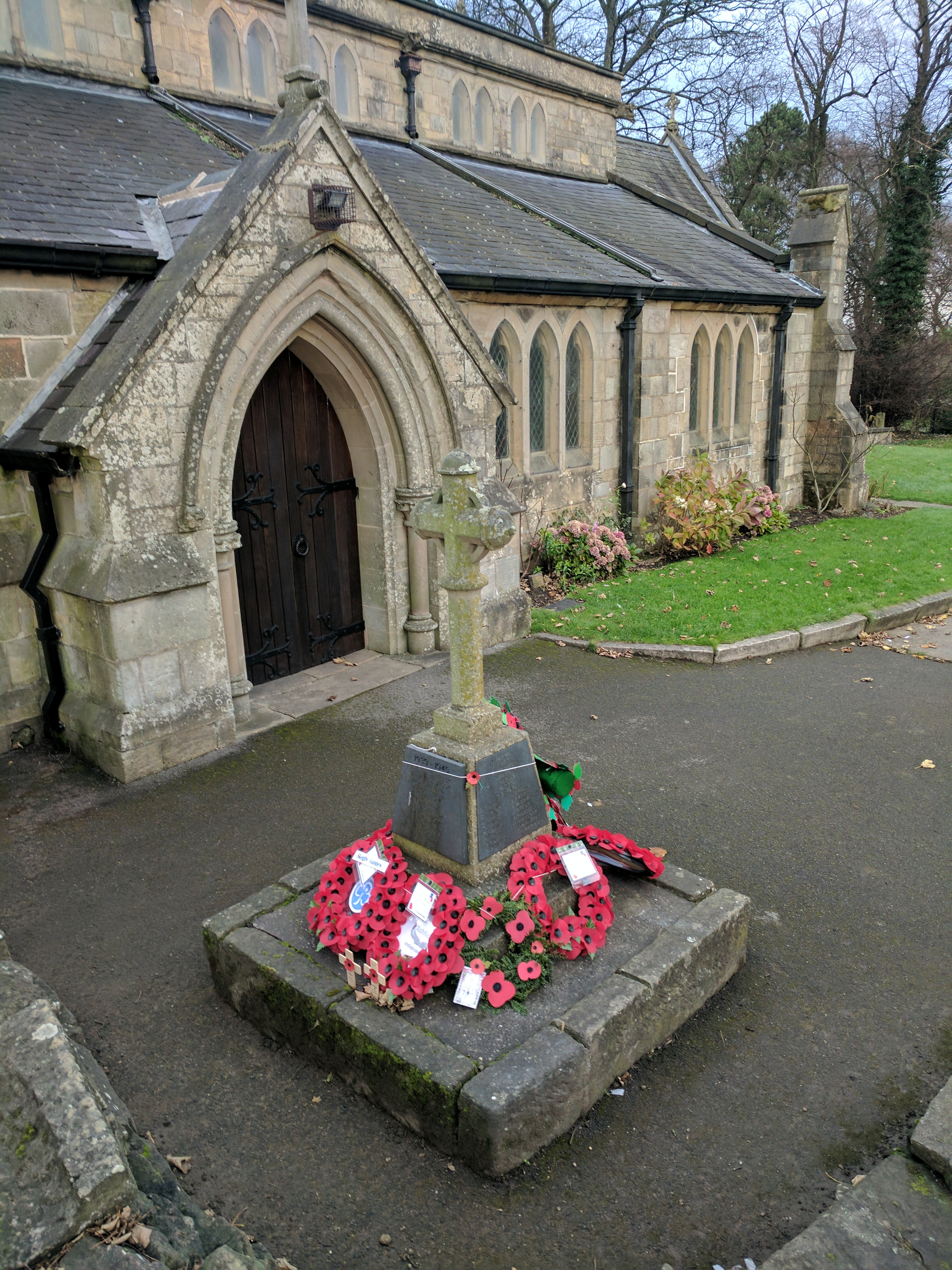
Skegby War Memorial, Near entrance to St Andrews Church

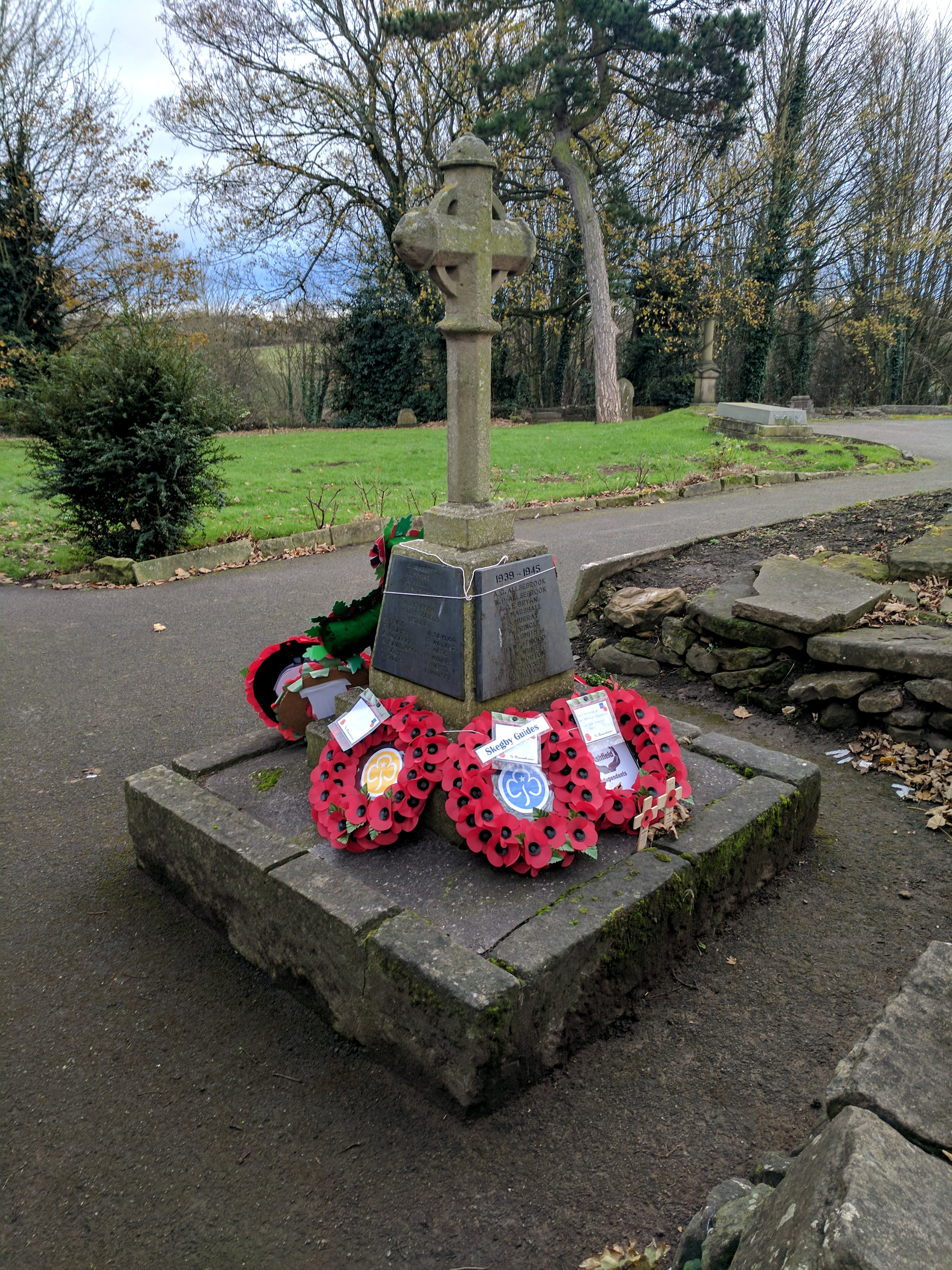
Skegby War Memorial, Near entrance to St Andrews Church

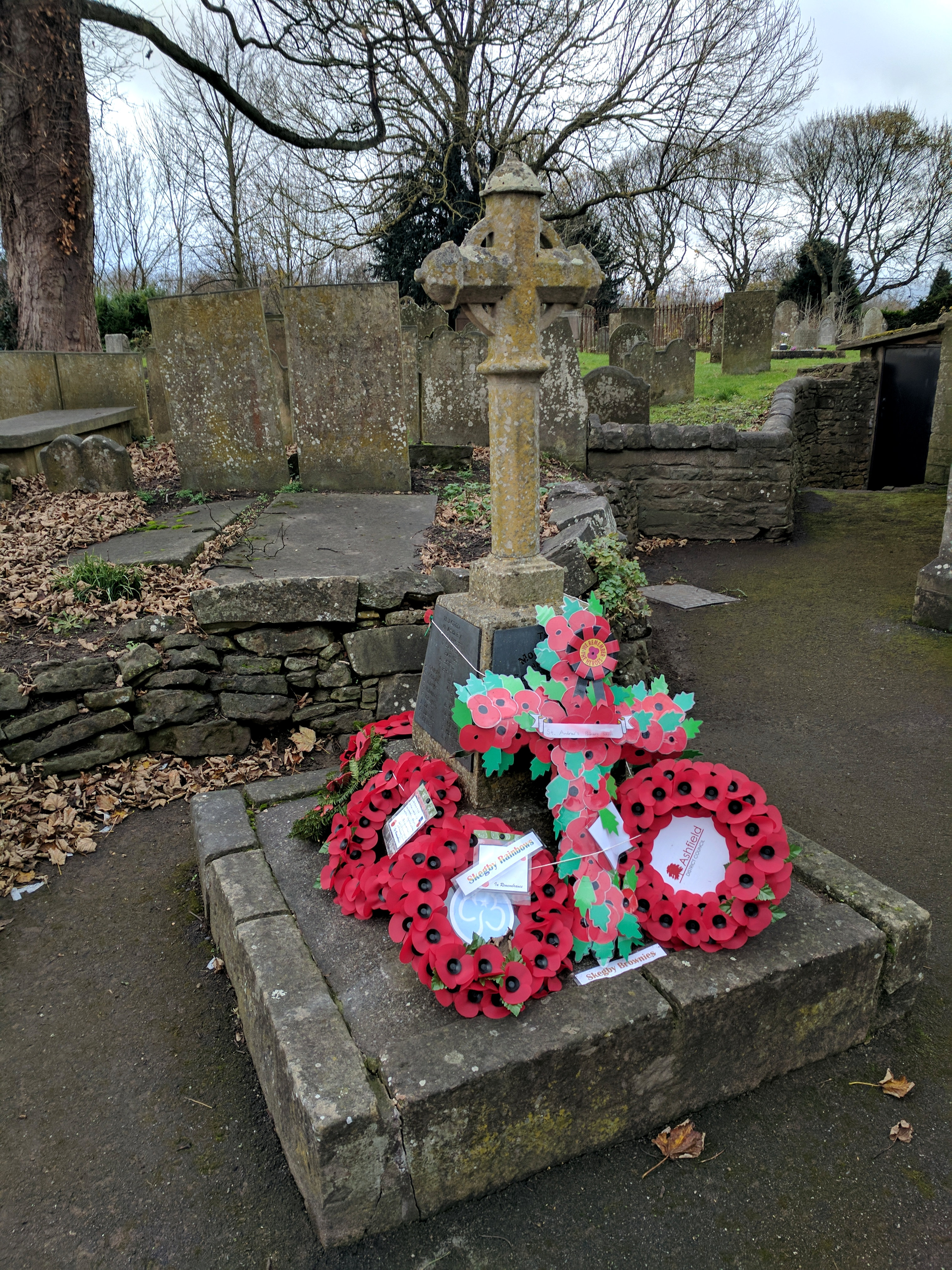
Skegby War Memorial, Near entrance to St Andrews Church

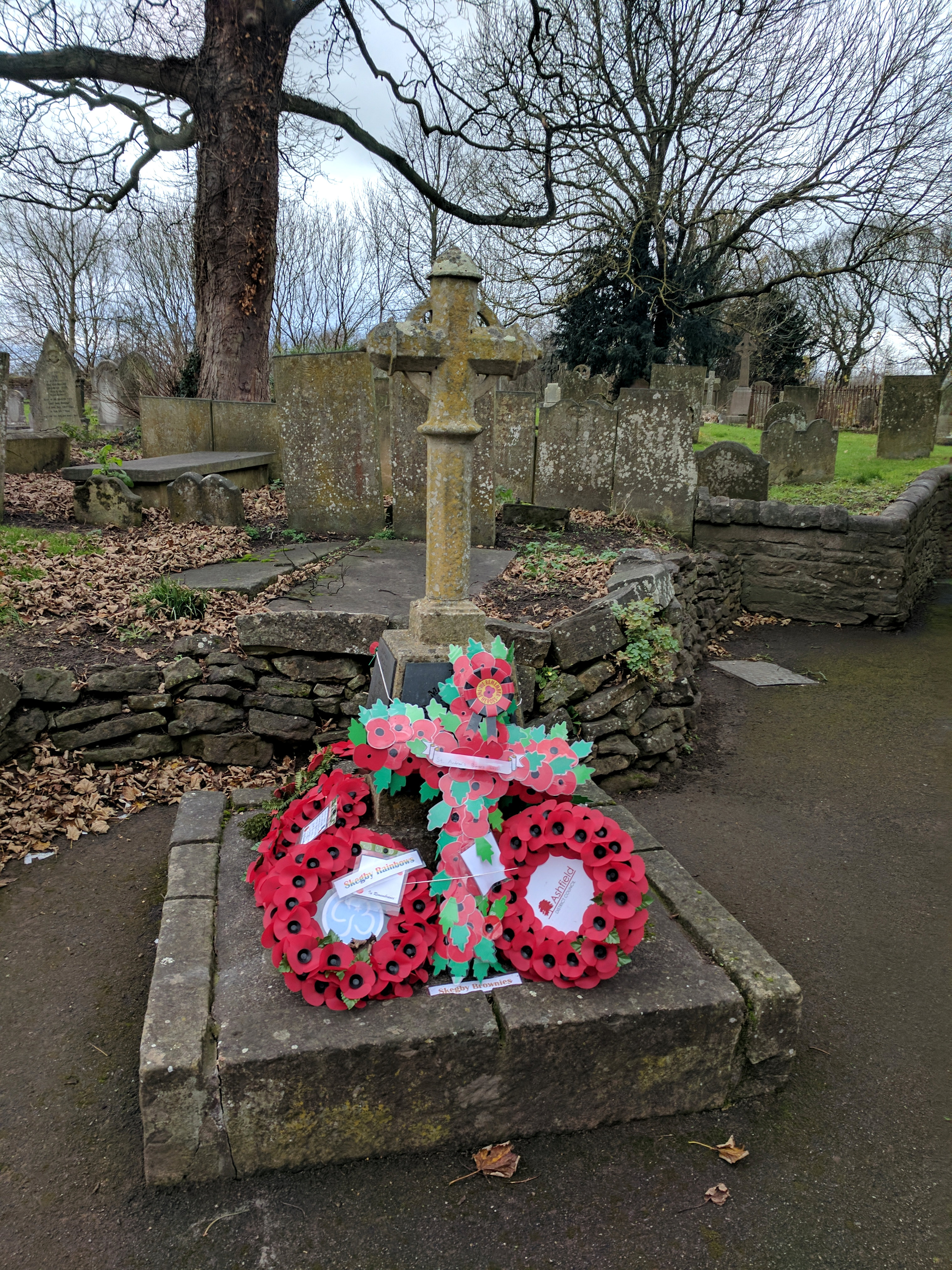
Skegby War Memorial, Near entrance to St Andrews Church
