= Elizabeth Hooton =

English dissenter (1600–1672)

- Church: Religious Society of Friends (Quakers)

Personal details
- Born: 1600 Nottingham, England
- Died: 8 January 1672 (aged 71–72) Jamaica
- Denomination: Quaker
- Residence: Skegby Nottinghamshire
- Spouse: Oliver Hooton
- Occupation: Early Quaker convert

Elizabeth Hooton (née Snowden) (1603 – January 8, 1672) was an English Dissenter and one of the earliest preachers in the Religious Society of Friends, also known as the Quakers. She was born in Nottingham, England. She was beaten and imprisoned for propagating her beliefs; she was the first woman to become a Quaker minister. She is considered one of the Valiant Sixty, a group of celebrated Friends preachers. Her surname is sometimes spelled Hooten.

== Introduction to George Fox ==
Hooton was among the first, perhaps the very first, to be convinced by the teachings of George Fox. Some sources indicate, however, that Fox actually clarified some of his beliefs from Hooton's mentoring of him. She was a middle-aged, married woman when she met Fox in 1647 at her home in Skegby, Sutton in Ashfield, Nottinghamshire, and was already a Nonconformist - specifically, a Baptist.

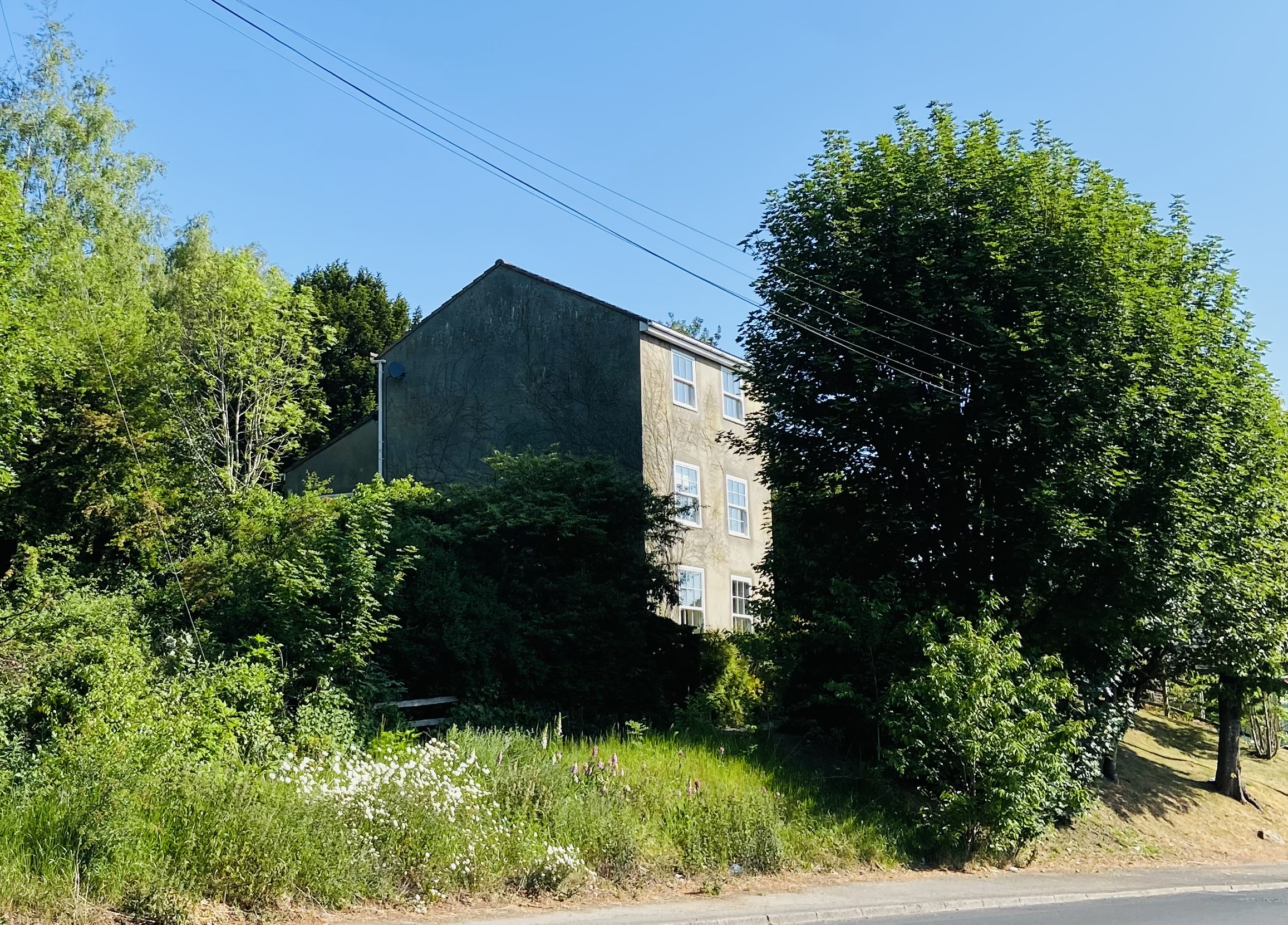
Quaker House, the former home of Elizabeth Hooton

== Ministry and persecution ==
She believed that God called her to preach, which led her to leave her family, because her husband was not at first sympathetic to Quaker ideas. Like other early Quakers she was imprisoned and beaten for her outspoken preaching, which went against the established church.

In 1651, she was imprisoned in Derby for reproving a priest; the following year she was put in prison at York Castle for preaching to a congregation at the end of the service. She was assaulted in 1660 by a church minister in Selston, who passed her on the street and knew that she was a Quaker.

She was once captured in Dedham, Massachusetts and received 10 lashes from a whip. She was then put on horseback, brought out into the wilderness, and left to die.

She and her friend Joan Brocksop travelled to Boston, Massachusetts, in 1662, where they were taken on a two-week walk into the woods and abandoned; they followed wolf tracks to a settlement, travelled to Rhode Island and then sailed back to England by way of Barbados.

Back home, she discovered that some of her cattle had been confiscated. She petitioned King Charles II for justice, and used the opportunity to preach to him and inform him of the religious intolerance occurring in the Massachusetts Bay Colony. He gave her a letter authorizing her to settle anywhere she liked in the American colonies and to set up a safe house for Quakers. She first went to Boston and was expelled. Then she went to Cambridge, Massachusetts. The authorities there gave no respect to the letter either, and ordered her whipped. Afterwards, she was again abandoned in the woods, but she made her way back to England.

Hooton was undeterred by the persecutions she suffered. In 1664, she was imprisoned in Lincoln for five months for disturbing a congregation.

== Final journey ==
Hooton embarked on her final voyage in 1670, joining George Fox on a trip to the West Indies and the American continent. The purpose of the trip was to encourage Friends in the New World. A week after arriving in Jamaica in 1672, Hooton died peacefully of natural causes.

George Fox wrote about her death, "... Elizabeth Hooton, a woman of great age, who had travelled much in Truth's service, and suffered much for it, departed this life. She was well the day before she died, and departed in peace, like a lamb, bearing testimony to Truth at her departure."

Hooton is memorialized in a panel of the Quaker Tapestry (panel B2), along with Mary Fisher, as an example of the Publishers of Truth, who were the earliest proponents of Quakerism.
