= Pilgrim house =

Pilgrim house may refer to:

- Baháʼí World Centre buildings#Pilgrim Houses
- Pilgrim House, Sydney
- Pilgrim Haus
- Russian Pilgrim's House (Jordan)

== See also ==
- Pilgrim (disambiguation)
