= List of World Heritage Sites in Jordan =

Location of World Heritage Sites in Jordan.

The United Nations Educational, Scientific and Cultural Organization (UNESCO) designates World Heritage Sites of outstanding universal value to cultural or natural heritage which have been nominated by countries which are signatories to the UNESCO World Heritage Convention, established in 1972. Cultural heritage consists of monuments (such as architectural works, monumental sculptures, or inscriptions), groups of buildings, and sites (including archaeological sites). Natural heritage consists of natural features (physical and biological formations), geological and physiographical formations (including habitats of threatened species of animals and plants), and natural sites which are important from the point of view of science, conservation, or natural beauty. Jordan accepted the convention on 5 May 1975.

There are eight World Heritage Sites listed in Jordan, with a further 13 on the tentative list. The first two sites inscribed to the list were Petra and Qusayr 'Amra, both listed in 1985. The most recent inscription was the Aqaba Marine Reserve, listed in 2026. Six sites are listed for their cultural significance while the Aqaba Marine Reserve is listed for natural significance and Wadi Rum is listed for both. Jordan has served on the World Heritage Committee twice.

== World Heritage Sites ==
UNESCO lists sites under ten criteria; each entry must meet at least one of the criteria. Criteria i through vi are cultural, and vii through x are natural.

World Heritage Sites
Site	Image	Location (governorate)	Year listed	UNESCO data	Description
Petra	Entrance to the treasury, partially carved and partially built in red sandstone	Ma'an	1985	326; i, iii, iv (cultural)	The Nabataean city of Petra was a major trading hub between Arabia, Egypt, and Syria Phoenicia, with trade links extending as far as India and China. Inhabited already in the 4th millennium BCE, when people were mining copper, the city thrived between the 4th century BCE and 1st century CE. The architecture of the buildings, which are partially cut from red sandstone, reflects the influences of Hellenistic art and of the Roman Empire, as well as of the later periods, with structures dating to the Byzantine, Islamic, and Crusader periods. The remains of a water management system that enabled life in a desert setting have been preserved as well. Al-Khazneh, or the treasury, is pictured.
Quseir Amra	Castle ruins in a desert setting	Zarqa	1985	327; i, iii, iv (cultural)	The desert castle of Quseir Amra was built in the early 8th century, and served both as a fortress and an Umayyad royal palace, with a reception hall and a hammam. The castle is noted for its extensive frescoes, depicting secular scenes inspired by Byzantine art, and constituting an important and unique example of early Islamic art.
Um er-Rasas (Kastrom Mefa'a)	Extensive floor mosaic depicting floral patterns, ships, and stylized cities	Madaba	2005	1093; i, iv, vi (cultural)	Established as a Roman military camp, Um er-Rasas grew into a settlement by the 5th century, inhabited successively by Christian and Islamic communities. The largely unexcavated site contains ruins of Roman fortifications, numerous churches, and two towers which were identified as those of ascetic stylite monks. The Church of Saint Stephen has mosaic floors (pictured) illustrating several cities of the region.
Wadi Rum Protected Area	Desert landscape with hills and mountains	Aqaba	2011	1377; iii, v, vii (mixed)	Wadi Rum features a great variety of desert landforms, including sandstone valleys, natural arches, gorges, cliffs, landslides, and caverns. The site also contains extensive rock art, inscriptions in various languages of the region, and archaeological remains, bearing witness to more than 12,000 years of continuous human habitation.
Baptism Site "Bethany Beyond the Jordan" (Al-Maghtas)	A pond with some wooden structures, the supposed location of the Baptism of Jesus	Balqa	2015	1446; iii, iv (cultural)	Situated on the Jordan River, Al-Maghtas (pictured) is considered by most Christian denominations to be the location of the Baptism of Jesus by John the Baptist. It is a pilgrimage site with remains of Roman and Byzantine churches, chapels, a monastery, caves, and pools. A nearby tell, Al-Kharrar, is associated with the ascension of the Old Testament prophet Elijah.
As-Salt – The Place of Tolerance and Urban Hospitality	A view at a city from above	Balqa	2021	689rev; ii, iii (cultural)	As-Salt served as a cultural, commercial, and financial hub of the region, and reached its peak prosperity between the 1860s and 1920s. The city has no physical segregation between the Christian and Muslim communities, who also share several cultural traditions. Merchants and craftsmen from the Levant settled in As-Salt, creating a distinct city, built with yellow limestone, that had European Art Nouveau and Neo-Colonial styles combined with local traditions.
Umm Al-Jimāl	Archaeological site with ruins of a building with two arched windows	Mafraq	2024	1721; iii (cultural)	The settlement developed on the site of a Roman military camp in the 5th century and lasted until the 8th century. It represents a typical settlement of the Hauran region's agricultural communities of the Byzantine and early Islamic periods. There are also remains of an irrigation system. Numerous inscriptions in different languages found on site demonstrate the changing religious beliefs and cultural practices.
Aqaba Marine Reserve	Underwater scene with corals and reef fish	Aqaba	2026	1742; ix, x (natural)	Located in the Gulf of Aqaba, the marine reserve has rich communities of marine life, such as reef-building corals and fish, with several endemic species. It is home to the endangered dugong and four species of sea turtles, as well as sharks and dolphins. Habitats also include seagrass meadows, sandy beaches, and mudflats.

== Tentative list ==
In addition to sites inscribed on the World Heritage List, member states can maintain a list of tentative sites that they may consider for nomination. Nominations for the World Heritage List are only accepted if the site was previously listed on the tentative list. Jordan maintains 13 properties on its tentative list.

Tentative sites
Site	Image	Location (governorate)	Year listed	UNESCO criteria	Description
Al Qastal (Settlement)	Interior of a castle in ruins	Amman	2001	i, iii, iv (cultural)	Al Qastal is one of the oldest Umayyad settlements in the Near East. It continued to be used during the Abbasid period until being briefly abandoned. It was then resettled under the Mamluk Sultanate. The complex has a palace (pictured), a mosque, residential buildings, a bathhouse, cisterns, and water reservoirs. Early Islamic tombstones and remains of mosaics found on the site are now displayed at a museum in Madaba.
The Sanctuary of Agios Lot, At Deir 'Ain 'Abata	Church ruins and entrance to the cave	Karak	2001	i, iii, iv (cultural)	The archaeological site centres on the remains of a Byzantine church, dating from the 5th to 7th century. The church was built around a natural cave that was interpreted by early Christians to be the site where Lot and his daughters took refuge after the destruction of Sodom, as told in the Book of Genesis. There is a mosaic floor with Byzantine Greek inscriptions in the church. Older findings on the site include the remains of Nabataean pottery and Bronze Age burials.
Shaubak Castle (Montreal)	Castle ruins with a visitor centre with a flag of Jordan in front	Ma'an	2001	i, iii, iv (cultural)	The Crusader castle was built by Baldwin I of Jerusalem (who was personally involved with the construction) in 1115 to strengthen the control of the land and to control the desert road between the Red Sea and Syria. The castle was later besieged by Saladin, until it surrendered in 1189 to Al-Adil I. Later additions to the structure took place during the Ayyubid and Mamluk periods. The main structures that date to the Crusader period are the remains of two churches.
Qasr Bshir (a Roman Castellum)	Fortress ruins	Karak	2001	i, iii, iv (cultural)	The fortress, located at the fringes of the Roman Empire, was constructed under the tetrarchy during the period of Diocletian, as one of several fortresses in the region. It had a roughly square plan, with a side of 56 m (184 ft) with towers at the corners. It housed troops and horses as it was ideally positioned for cavalry patrols of the region.
Pella (Modern Tabaqat Fahil)	Remains of a Byzantine basilica with several standing columns	Irbid	2001	i, iii, iv (cultural)	Pella was continuously inhabited at least since the Neolithic. There are remains of Bronze Age settlements, and findings demonstrate that people had trade connections with the cultures of the eastern Mediterranean. Most of the remaining structures date from the Roman Empire, Byzantine, and Islamic periods. The remains of a Byzantine basilica are pictured.
Qasr Al-Mushatta	Museum display of elaborate stone facade of a palace	Amman	2001	i, iii, iv (cultural)	The palace was the largest and most ambitious of the Umayyad palaces in Jordan. It was probably commissioned by Al-Walid II in the mid-8th century. It was richly decorated with stone carvings, showcasing the skill of early Islamic stonework and plastic carving. However, most of the carvings were given away as a gift of the Ottoman Sultan Abdul Hamid II to the German Emperor Wilhelm II, and are now displayed in the Pergamon Museum in Berlin (exhibit pictured).
Abila City (Modern Qweilbeh)	Archaeological site with several standing columns	Irbid	2001	i, iii, iv (cultural)	The city of Abila was a member of the Decapolis, a group of ten important cities in the region. It was inhabited from at least the Bronze Age to the Umayyad period. Today, it is an archaeological site, with tombs from different periods, remains of city walls, aqueducts, and monumental columns (pictured) that remain of a building that was at one point converted into a Christian basilica.
Gadara (Modern Um Qeis or Qays)	Archaeological site with several standing columns	Irbid	2001	i, iii, iv (cultural)	Gadara was one of the leading members of the Decapolis, a group of ten important cities in the region. It reached its peak in the 1st century CE. Today, it is an archaeological site, with rock-cut tombs, two theatres, remains of city fortifications, a Roman mausoleum, and two Byzantine bath complexes. Large parts of the site have not yet been excavated.
Jerash Archaeological City (Ancient Meeting Place of East and West)	Archaeological site with several standing columns	Jerash	2004	iii, iv (cultural)	Jerash was a member of the Decapolis, a group of ten important cities in the region. It flourished in the 2nd and 3rd centuries CE. It was abandoned at some point after the 12th century and the ruins were rediscovered in 1806. The UNESCO nomination documentation provides no description.
Dana Biosphere Reserve	Mountainous desert landscape with rock formations	Tafilah	2007	iv, vii, viii, x (mixed)	The reserve comprises mountains and wadis, and is rich in biodiversity. Tree species include Juniperus phoenicea and Cupressus sempervirens, while animal species include the sand cat and the endangered Arabian wolf. There are numerous archaeological sites in the area, the most important being ancient copper mines.
Azraq	Wetland with high grasses	Zarqa	2007	iv, v, x (mixed)	The wetland is located in the middle of a desert and is thus an important area for migratory and resident birds. It is also home to the endemic fish Aphaniops sirhani. Due to water extraction, the surface water has essentially dried out by 1993, but an internationally backed project later restored a significant portion of the wetland. There are remains of Roman walls and Umayyad desert castles in the area.
Mujib Nature Reserve	A narrow canyon with a shallow river	Karak, Madaba	2007	vii, viii (natural)	The reserve comprises several rivers and wadis, and parts of it are considered wetlands. It is located along the Jordan Rift Valley, and borders the Dead Sea on the western side. The area is an important corridor for migratory birds. Some of the recorded bird species include the Egyptian vulture, Bonelli's eagle, and Eurasian griffon vulture; mammals include the golden jackal, honey badger, caracal, and Nubian ibex.
The Jordanian ḥarrah	Desert landscape with basalt stones	Mafraq	2019	iii, v (cultural)	The area is part of the Harrat al-Sham, a basalt desert that stretches from southern Syria to northern Saudi Arabia. It has been inhabited since prehistoric times. There are numerous rock inscriptions and graffiti dating from the 1st century BCE to the 4th century CE, which mention historical figures such as Herod the Great and several Roman emperors. They indicate that literacy was widely spread among the desert nomads of that period. There are also inscriptions from the early Islamic and later periods. The area around Jawa is pictured.

== See also ==
- List of Intangible Cultural Heritage elements in Jordan
- Tourism in Jordan
