= Aleppo Room =

Syrian paneling displayed in Berlin

- القاعة الحلبية (Arabic)
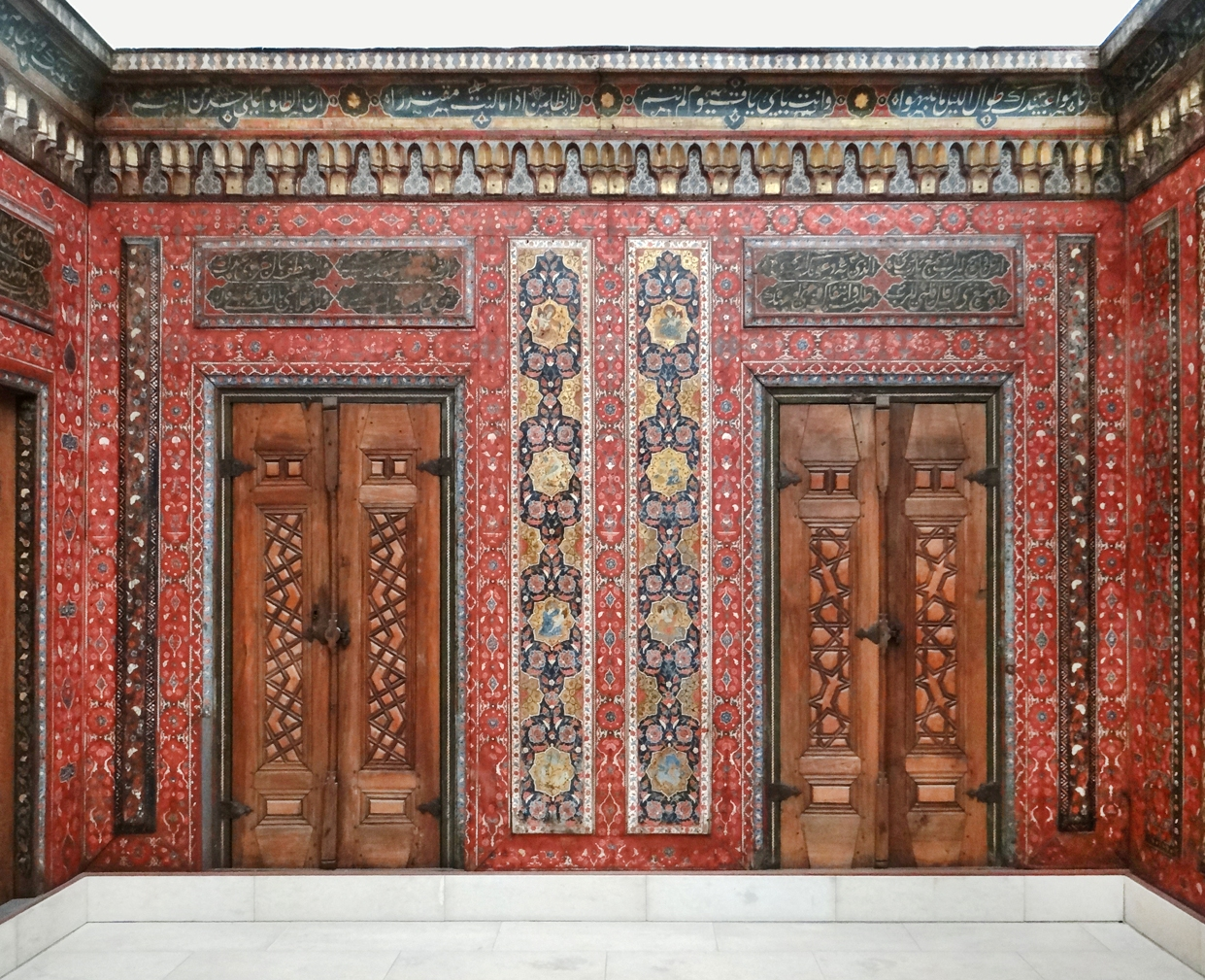
- Wooden wall paneling of the Aleppo Room
- Artist: Halab Shah ibn Isa
- Year: Hegira 1009 or 1012 / AD 1600–01 or 1603)
- Movement: Ottoman Syria
- Subject: Syrian Heritage: Christian and Islamic iconography on a Syrian room paneling
- Dimensions: 295 cm × 750 cm × 1100 cm (116 in × 300 in × 430 in)
- Location: Museum of Islamic Art, Berlin, Germany
- Website: Aleppo-Zimmer

The Aleppo Room (Arabic: الغرفة الحلبيَّة, romanized: al-Ġurfah al-Ḥalabiyyah) is the paneling of a reception room, or qa’a, from a residential building in Aleppo, Syria. The wooden panels now form part of the collections of the Museum of Islamic Art section of the Pergamon Museum, on Berlin's Museum Island.

The panels found their way to Germany after the Wakil family sold them in 1912 to Mrs. Mary Koch, who then donated them to the Pergamon Museum in Berlin. Currently, the panels are displayed in the "Aleppian Hall" in the Islamic section of the museum.

Bayt Wakil house is situated in Al-Jdayde quarter on Sissi Street in Aleppo. It includes two attached houses that are best known for this intricate wooden paneling. The Aleppo Room paneling were carved by a Persian artist in 1603, including painted depictions of Christian scenes featuring the Virgin Mary, Christ and his disciples.

== Description ==
The Aleppo Room's ornate woodwork belongs to Wakil House (Arabic: بيت وكيل / ALA-LC: Beit Wakil) in Al-Jdayde historic district in the Syrian city of Aleppo. The wood paneling covered the walls of the oldest hall in the house. The inscriptions written on them date them to the year (Hegira 1009 or 1012 / AD 1600–01 or 1603). According to this, these paintings are the oldest Syrian art from this category that still exist today. In addition, the images have a special value; in addition to the plant motifs that usually dominate Islamic decoration, these also include scenes with people and various scenes that also include animals.

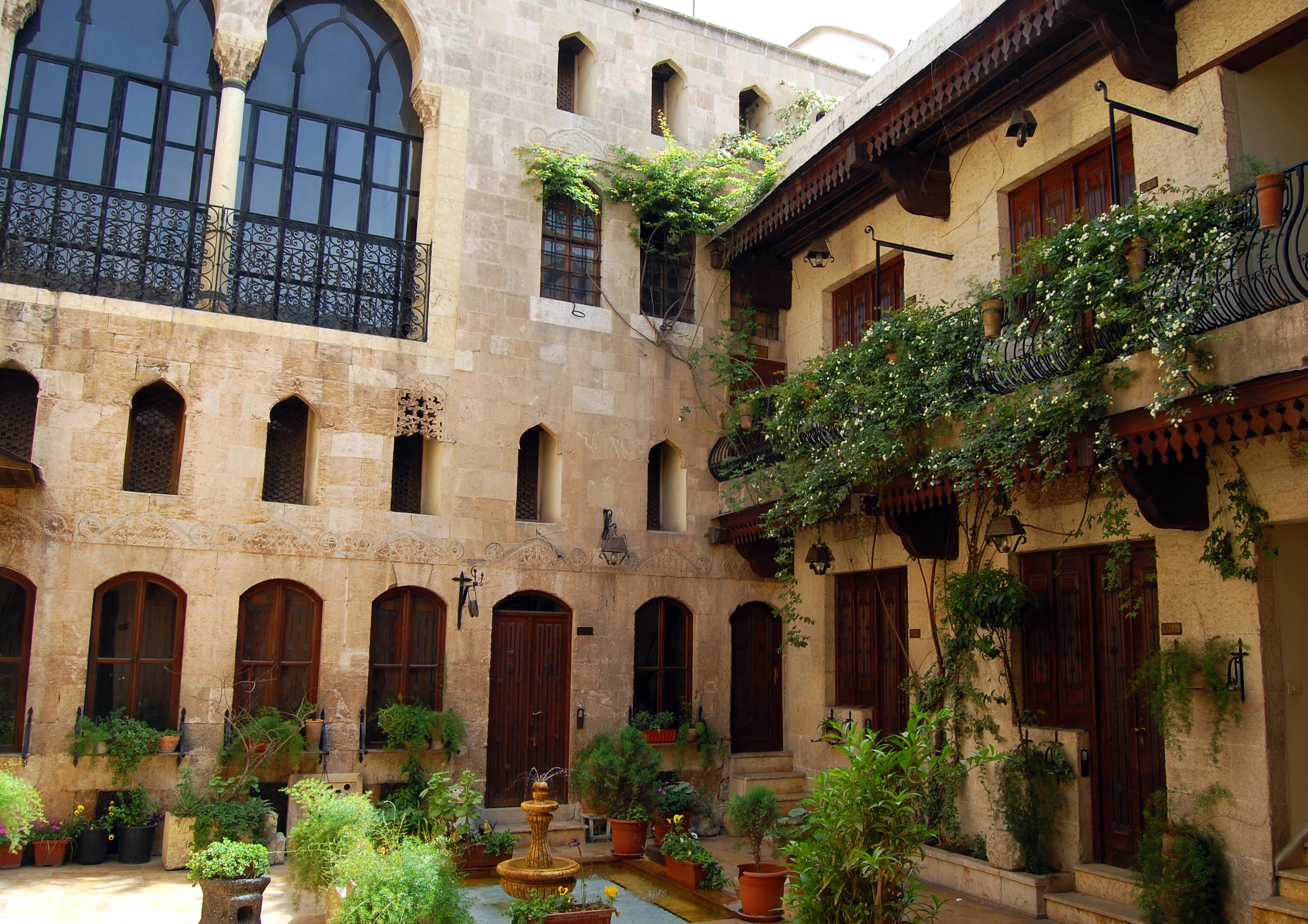
Beit Wakil in Al-Jdayde District in Aleppo, the first home of the Aleppo Room, 36.207696, 37.156238

== The Aleppo Room mobility ==
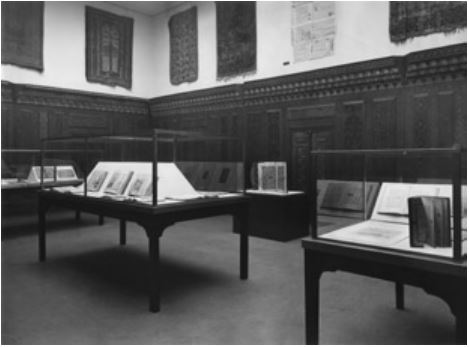
Display of the Aleppo Room about 1938. Photo: Museum für Islamische Kunst Berlin

The painted wooden wall panelling once furnished the reception hall of a wealthy broker's home, who was a Christian citizen in the Ottoman Empire at the beginning of the 17th century. In this room he welcomed visitors from other ethnic and religious backgrounds.

The panels found their way to Germany after the Wakil family sold them in 1912 to Mrs. Mary Koch, who then donated them to the Pergamon Museum in Berlin. The museum obtained them by purchase in 1912 AD for an amount of one thousand Ottoman liras at that time. They are housed in the Museum of Islamic Art.

Since the Aleppo Room came from Aleppo, Syria into the collection of the Museum für Islamische Kunst, its presentation has changed several times. All these changes are related to historical assumptions, museum concepts and didactic approaches. Soon after its arrival in Berlin, only some of the panels were shown in the Kaiser Friedrich Museum (originally called Kaiser - Friedrich - Museum by Emperor Frederick III of Germany), now known as the Bode Museum. Presumably the lack of space made this reduced presentation necessary, because the Islamic collection was only one department of the Kaiser Friedrich Museum. But it also reveals the founders’ intention at that time. The exhibition should represent a wide range of works of art from the Islamic lands with their different compositions of ornaments and patterns. Islamic Art changed at that time from a relatively strange and unknown to a popular subject with a growing public interest.

The display was first of all aimed at making this style descriptive and comprehensible to the visitors. In 1932 the collection moved into the then newly built Pergamon Museum, where it has remained until today. This was the chance for an extended exhibition. With more space available, the Aleppo Room was presented in a special space of its own, where the whole room could be viewed at once.

A historical photograph of 1938 shows the arrangement of the complete panelling in a rectangular form along the walls. It has been extended to a three-dimensional presentation. But the decorative panels of the Aleppo Room served more as a surrounding for a regular exhibition room with show-cases. The impression of its original intention and its relevance as a unique example of interior decoration was still barely noticeable. Also, the aim was to present the panels as objects of art rather than to convey their relevance to an architectural context. The room remained as such until the end of World War II. In order to protect the panels, they were dismantled and stored in boxes. Some of the panels were kept in storage in the Pergamon.

== Subjects in the Aleppo Room ==
There is a depiction of the Last Supper in which Jesus and his disciples sit on the floor, Oriental-style. Another one shows women with flaming halos surrounding their heads. The paintings on the walls of this salon have Christian symbolism. The wooden panels of this salon came from a wealthy Syrian merchant and date back to the 17th century, Isa ibn Butrus. The owner of the house in which these panels were found, had deliberately merged Christian and Islamic iconography in these images, selecting for the murals biblical figures who also play a role in the Quran. Unlike most of his business partners in Syria at that time, Isa ibn Butrus was a Christian.

Some of the themes in the Aleppo Room

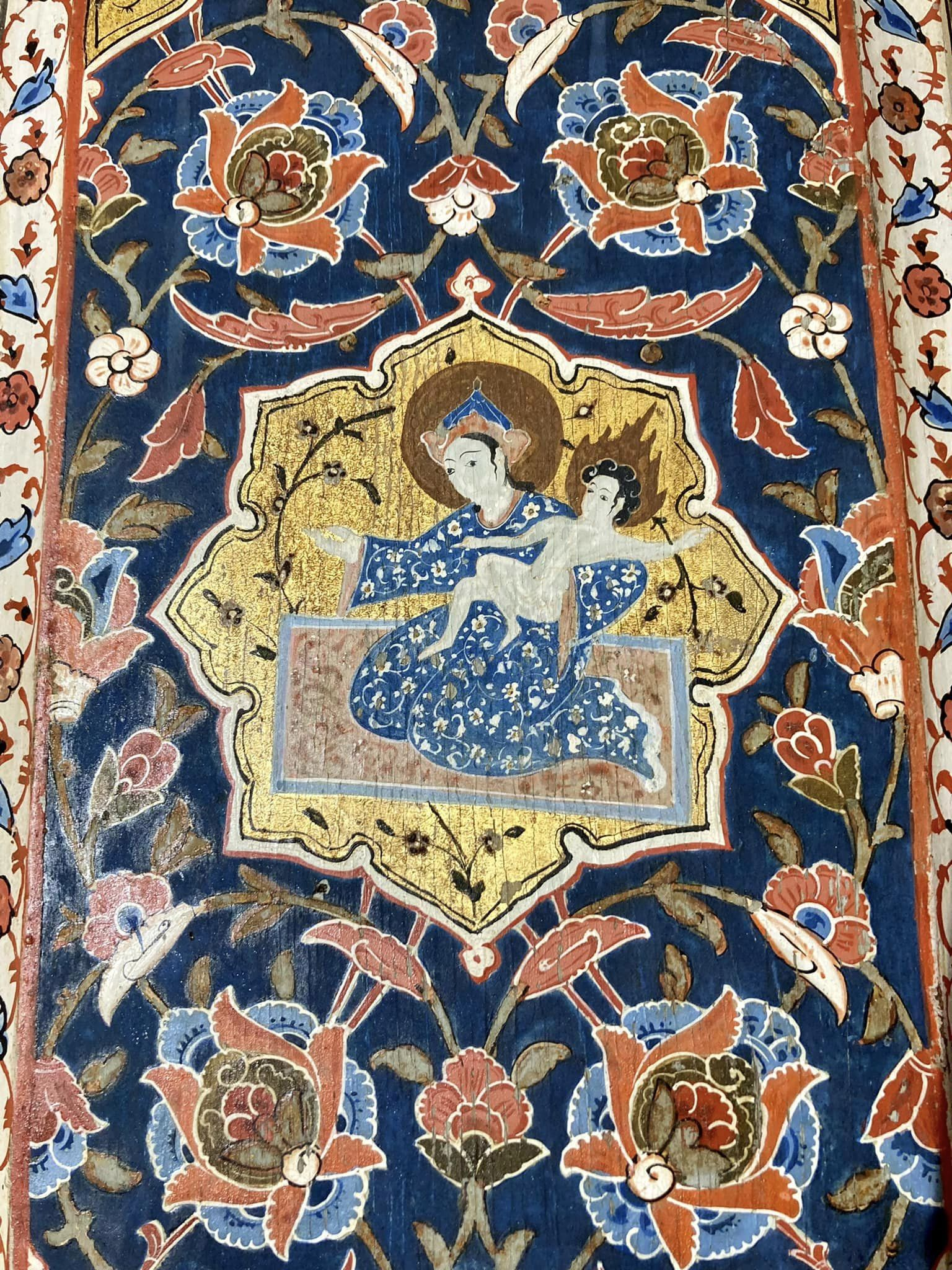
Virgin & child

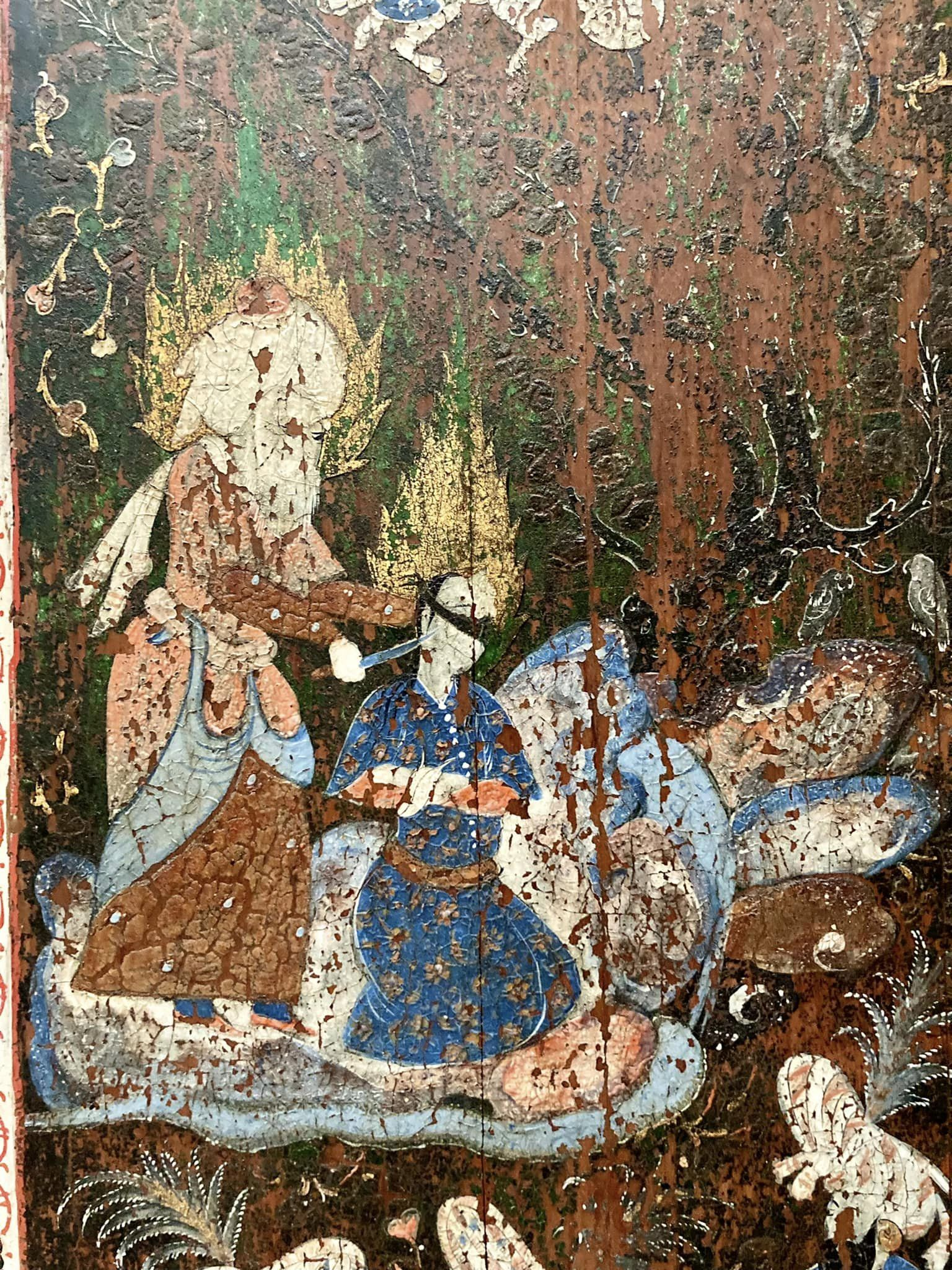
Sacrifice of Isaac

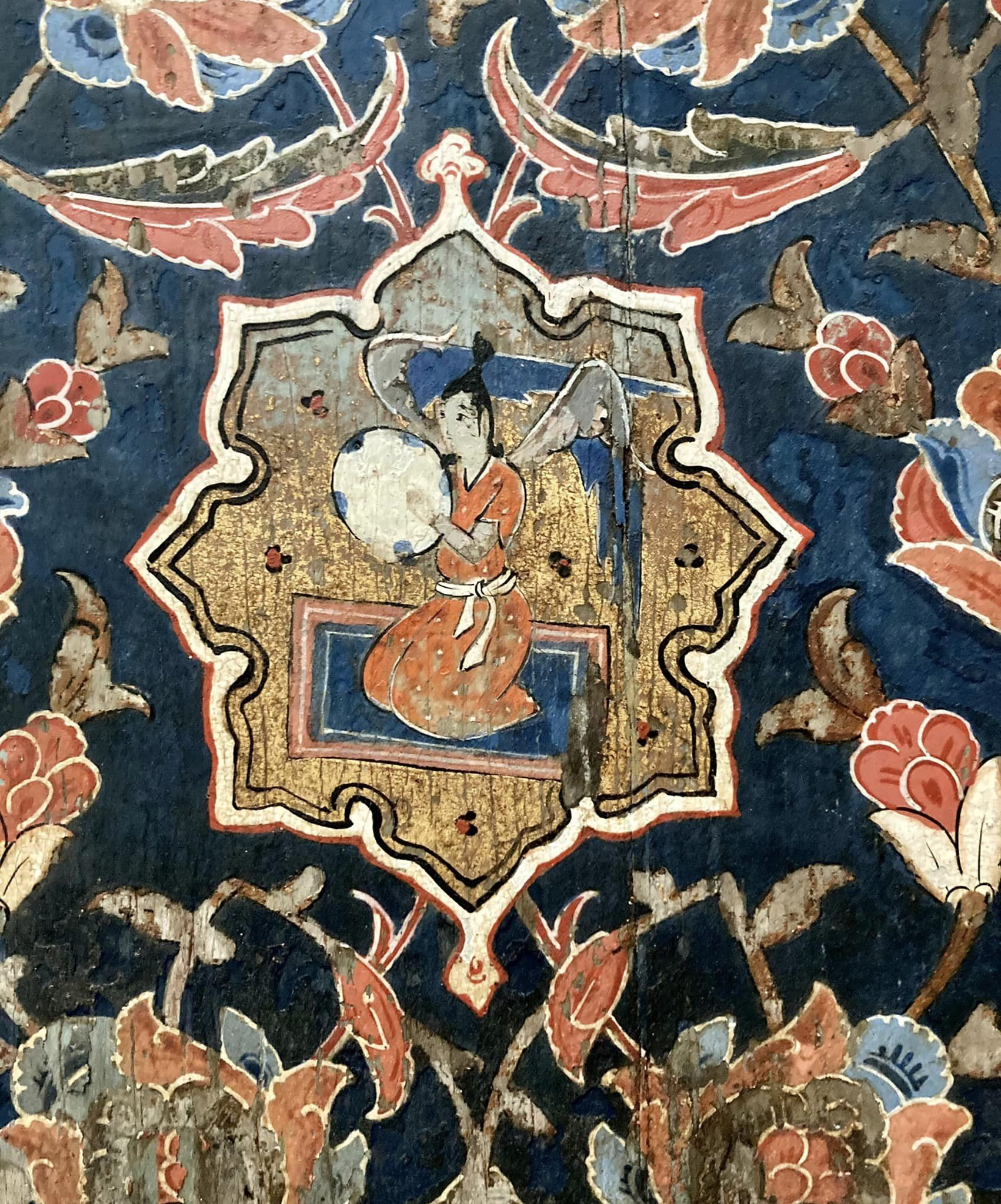
Angelic musician, Aleppo Room

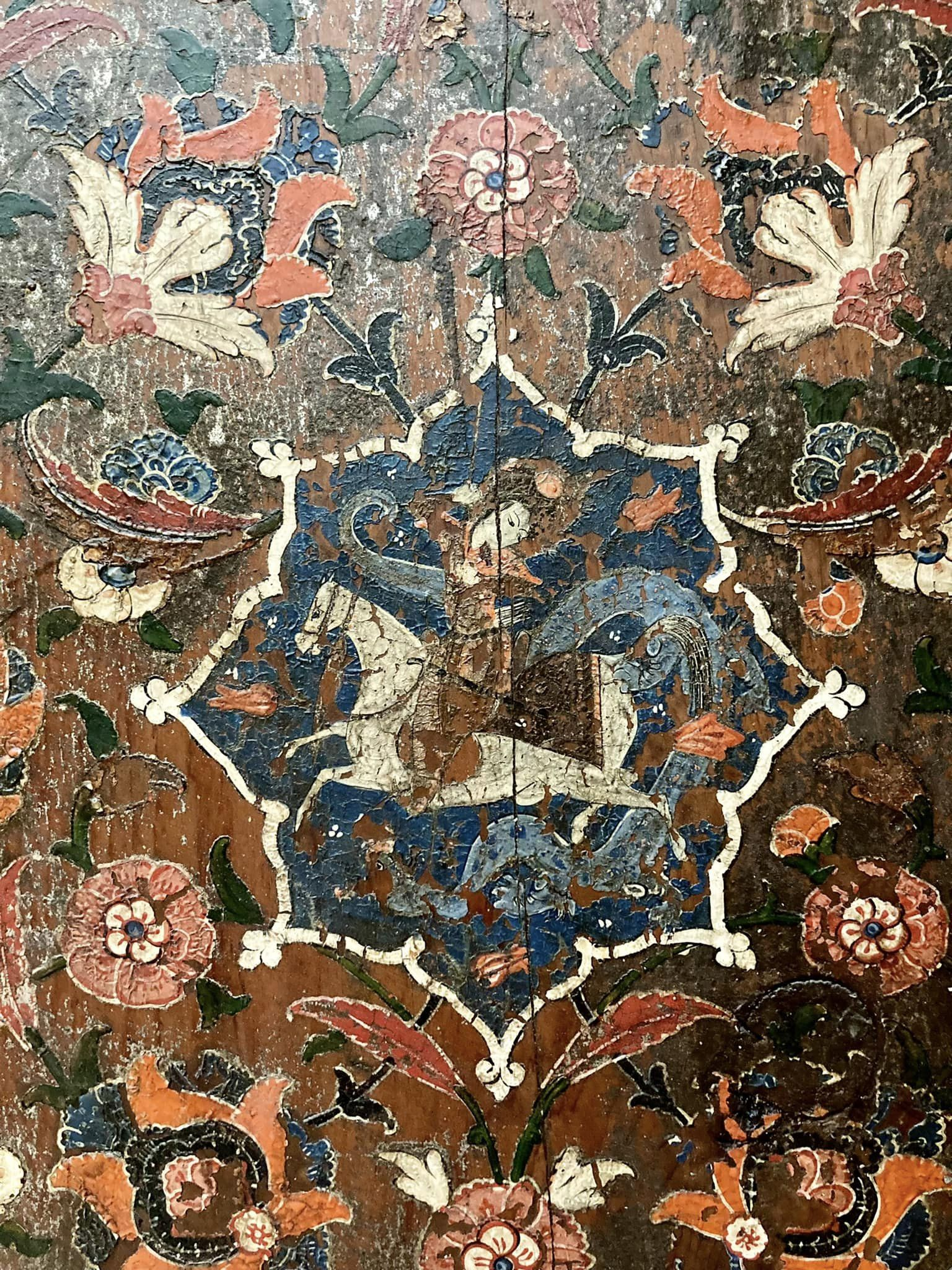
St. George slaying the dragon, the Aleppo Room

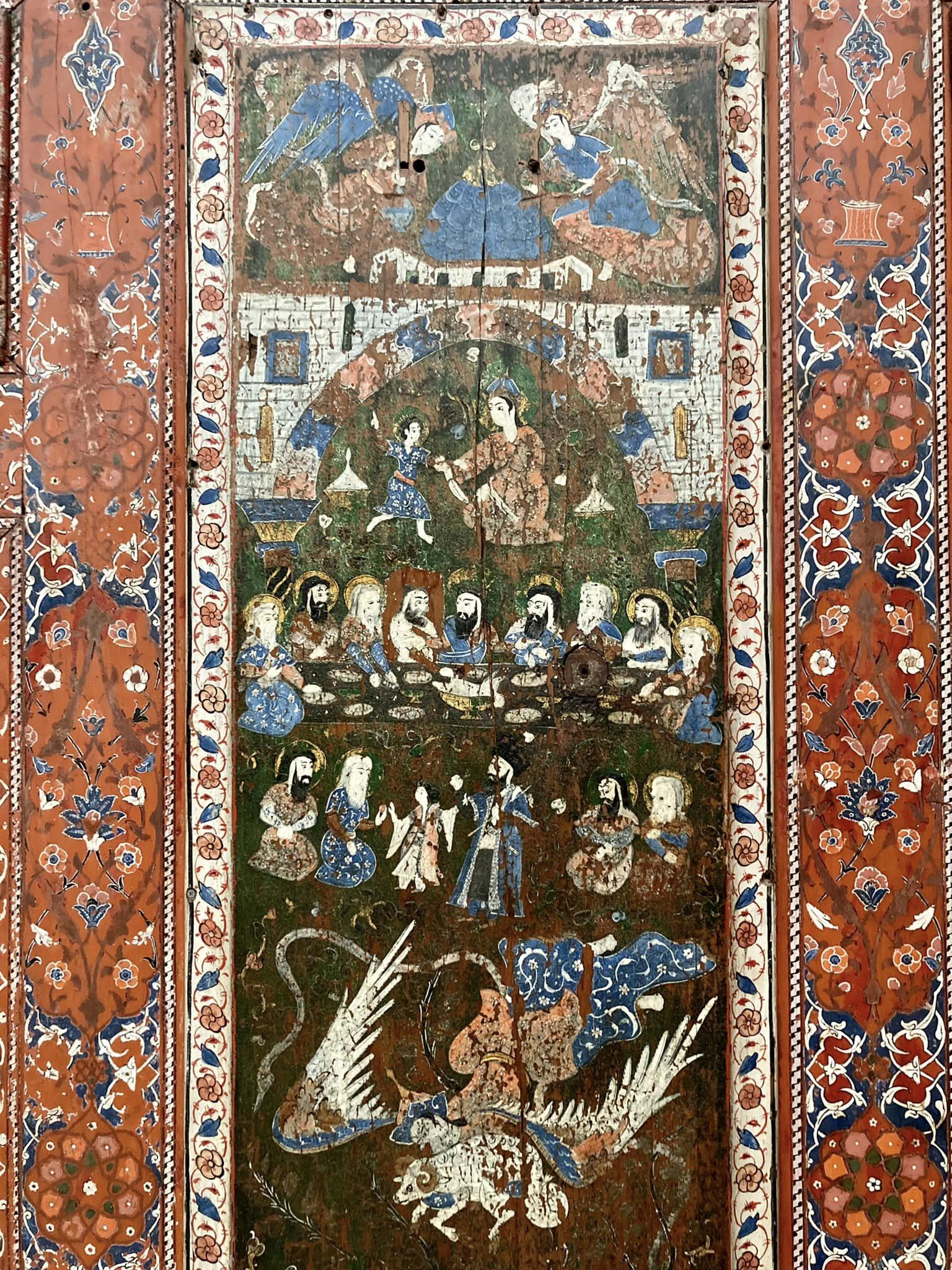
Jesus in the temple, Last Supper

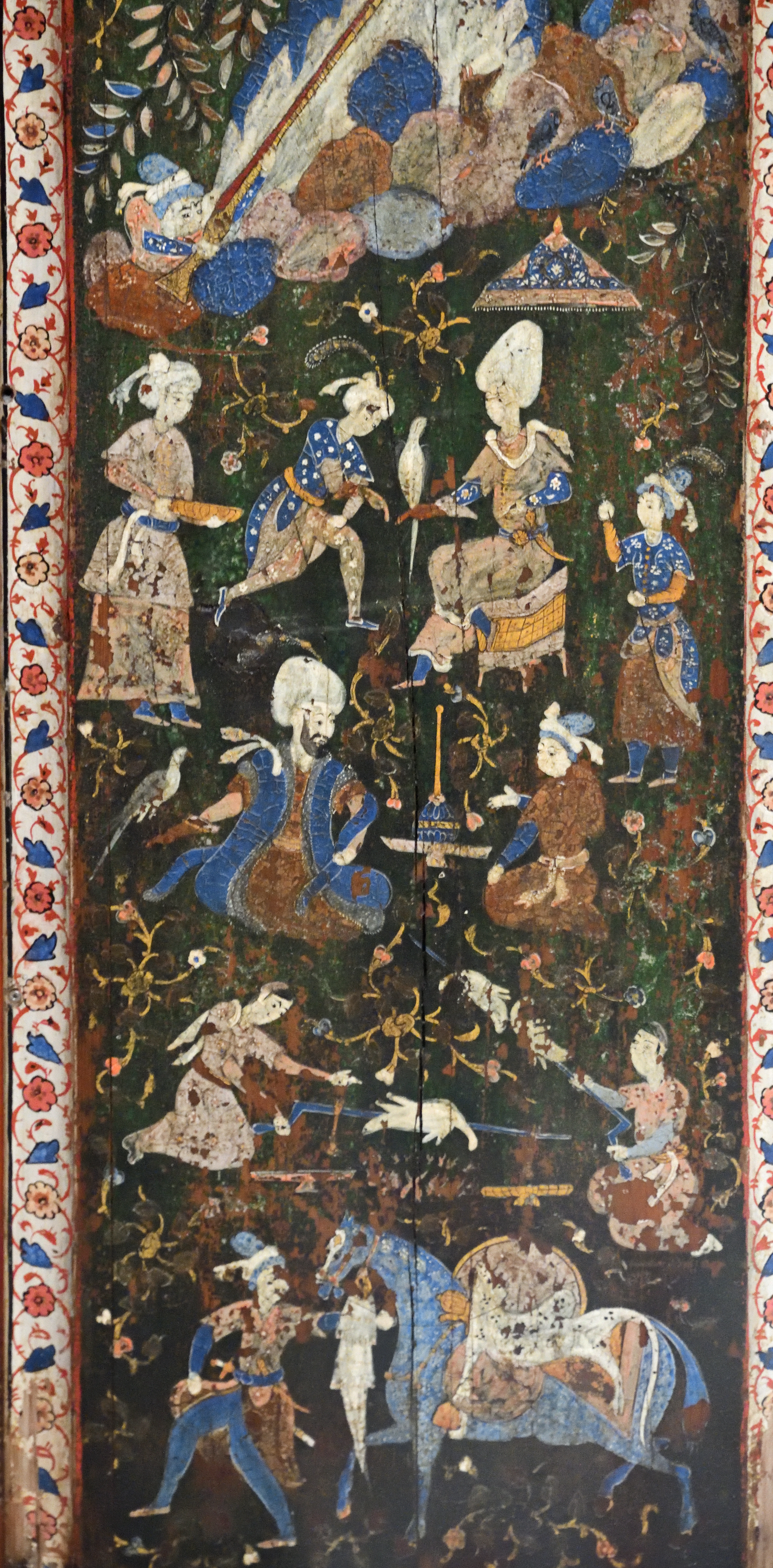
Scenes from Community life

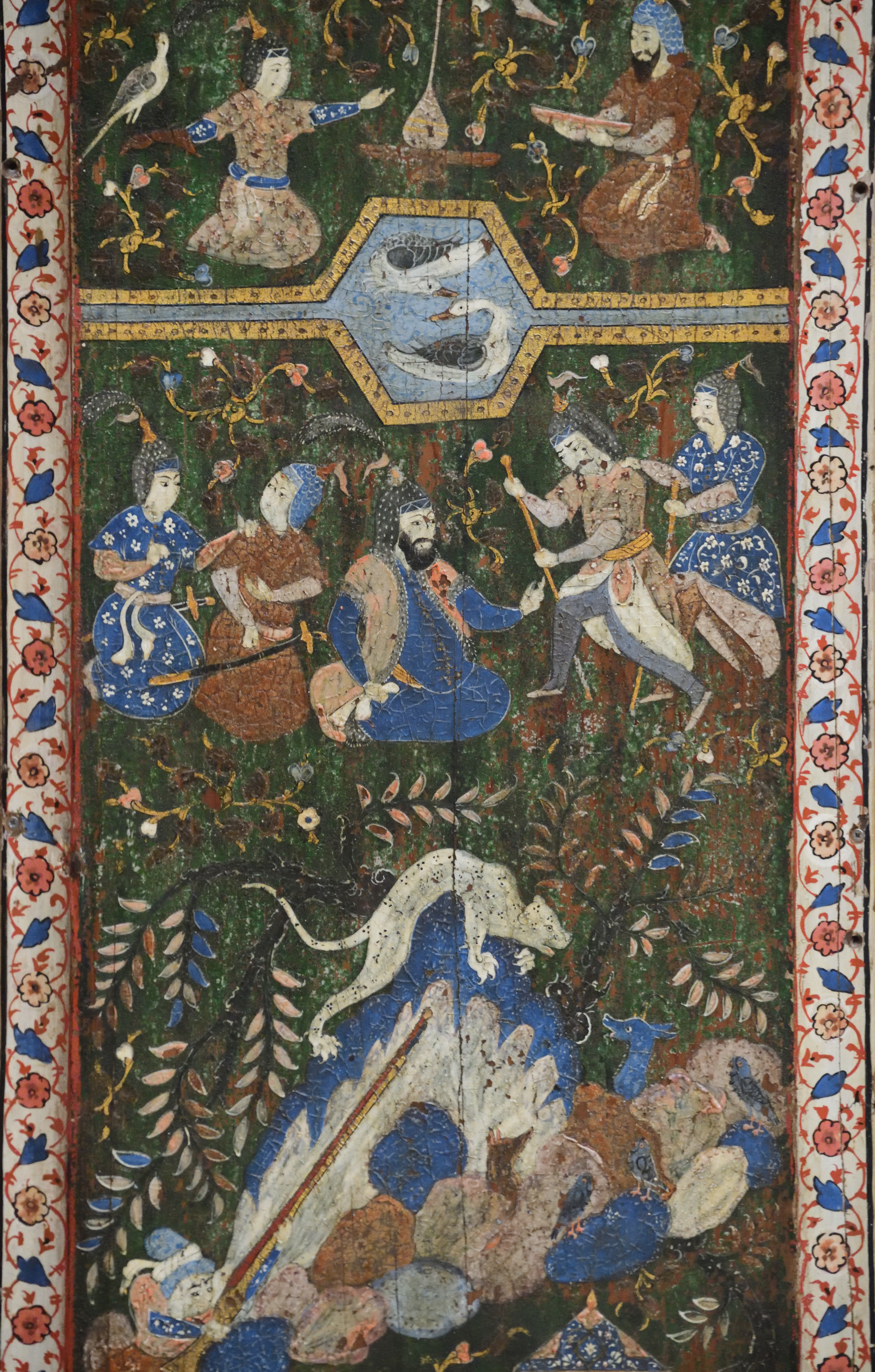
Hunting with Ottoman rifle

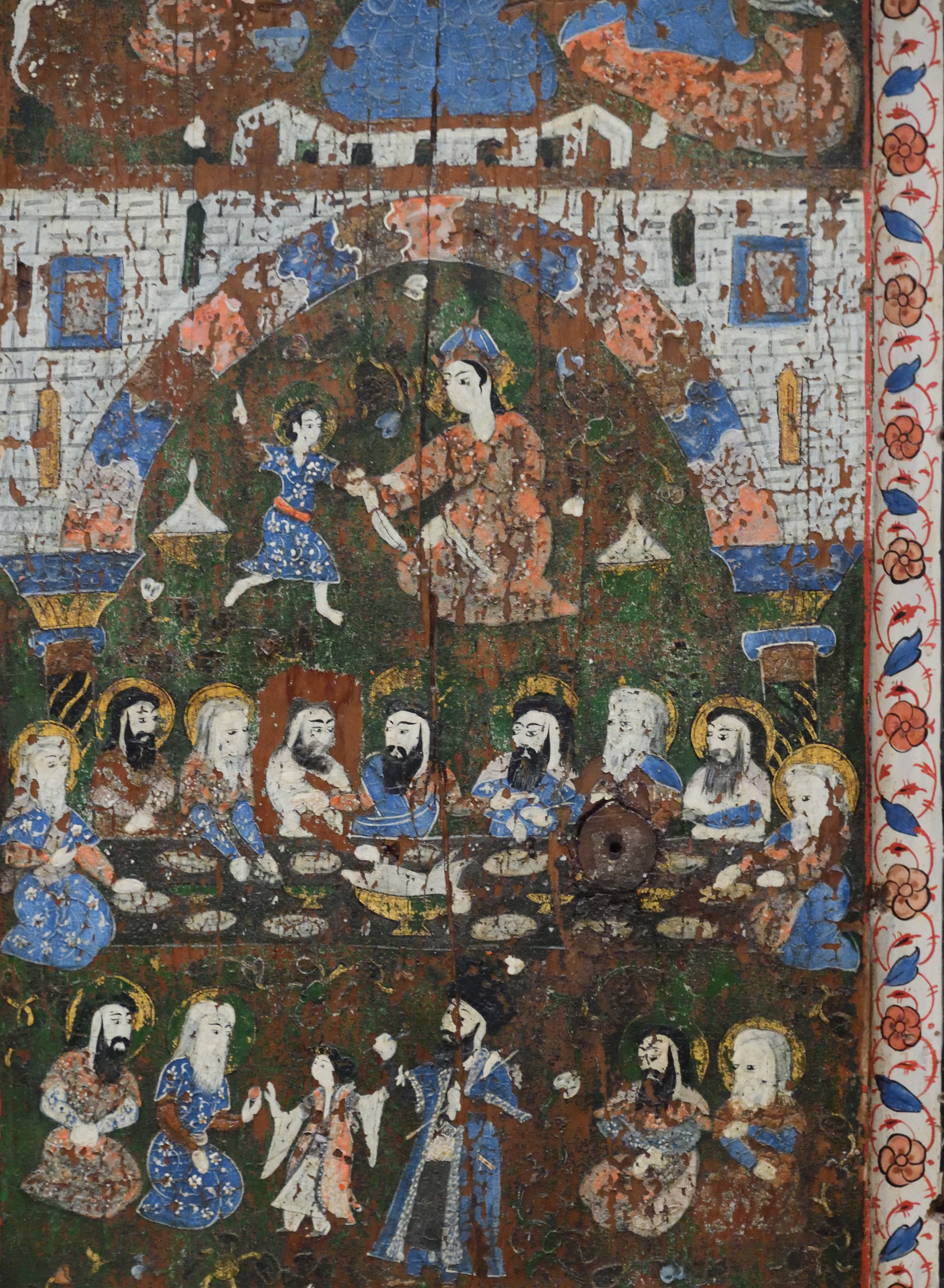
The Last Supper

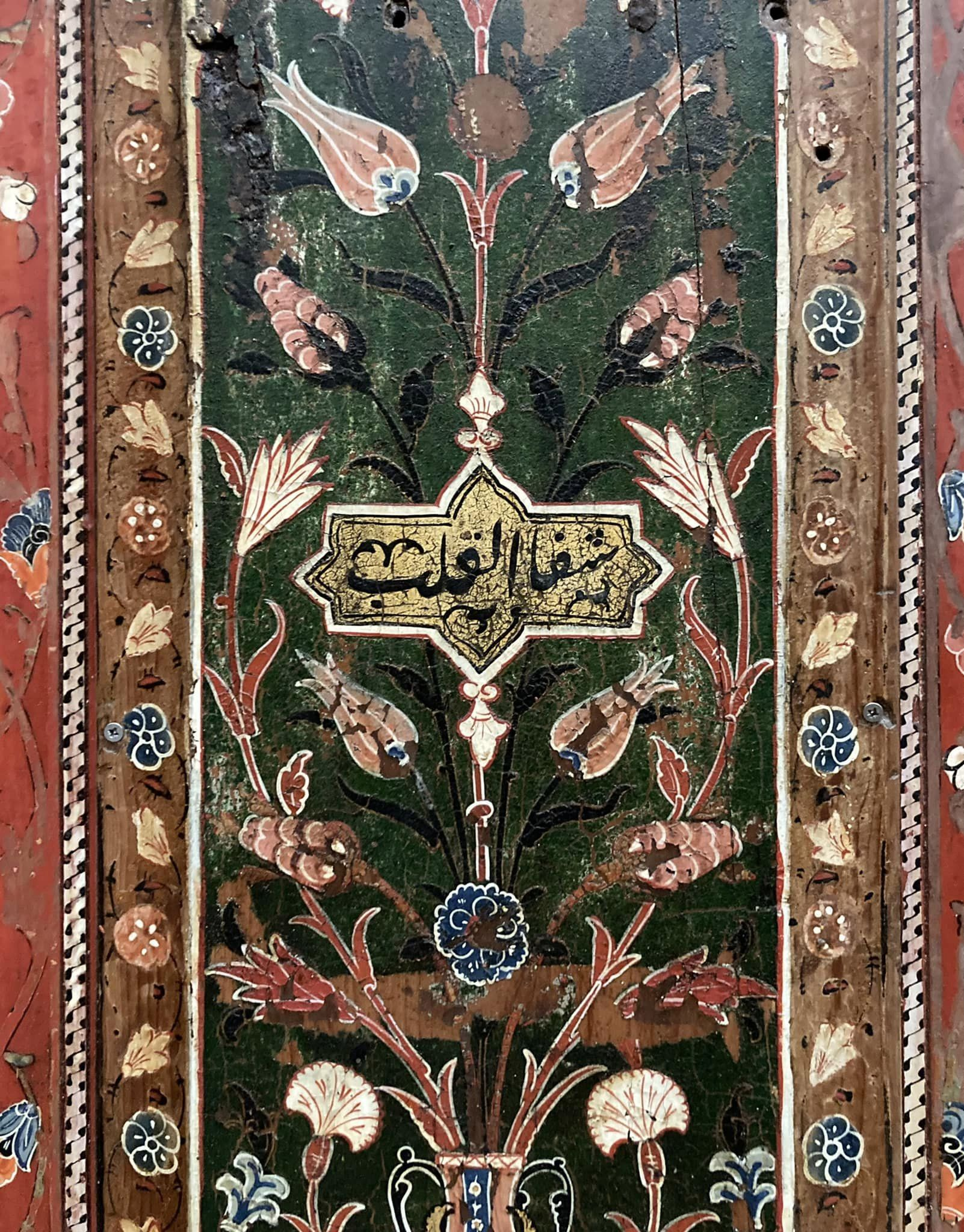
Arabic writing means: Healing of the Heart (Arabic: شفا القلب)

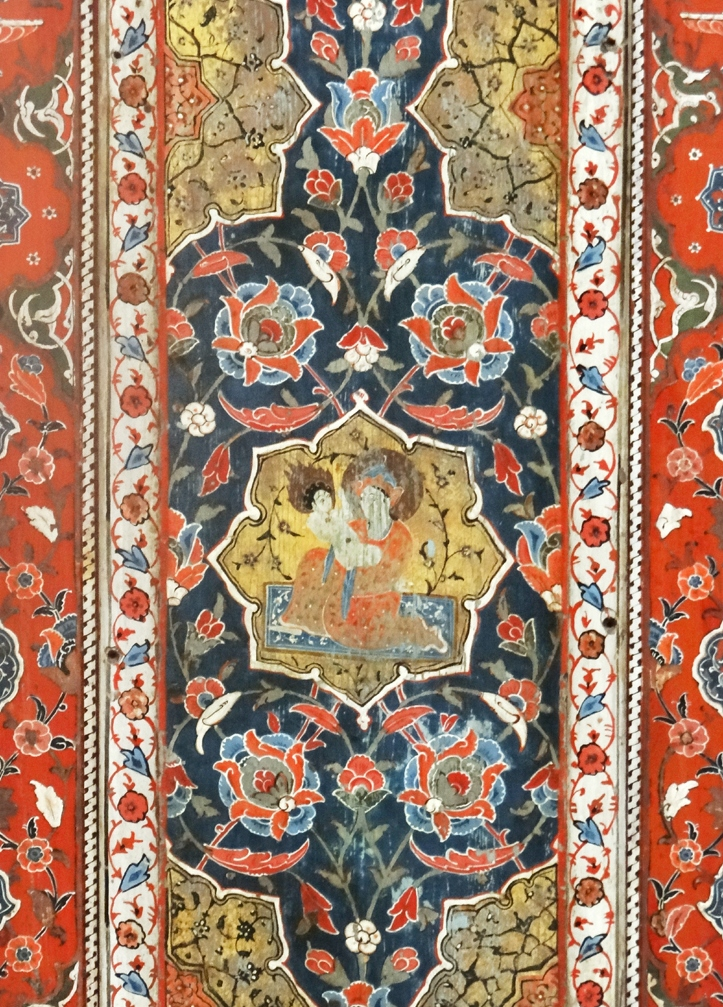
Virgin & child

The central panels are found in the back part of the main niche, to the left and right of a wall cupboard. Courtly themes are repeated on the left-side panel, including a ruler sitting on a throne, a hunt and a hunting party with a prince holding a falcon. In contrast, Christian themes are portrayed on the right-side panel, and include the Last Supper, Salome's dance in front of King Herod and the sacrifice of Isaac. Other panels around the room have individual depictions from either courtly or Christian subject matters, such as the love story of Leila and Majnun of Nizami (1141–1202) from the Haft Paykar, or the Virgin Mary and Child or Saint George. Real and imaginary animals are depicted alongside. It is the variety of the subjects of these paintings that make these earliest surviving wall panels such a comprehensive collection, a variety that could perhaps only have arisen in the Syrian trading town Aleppo.

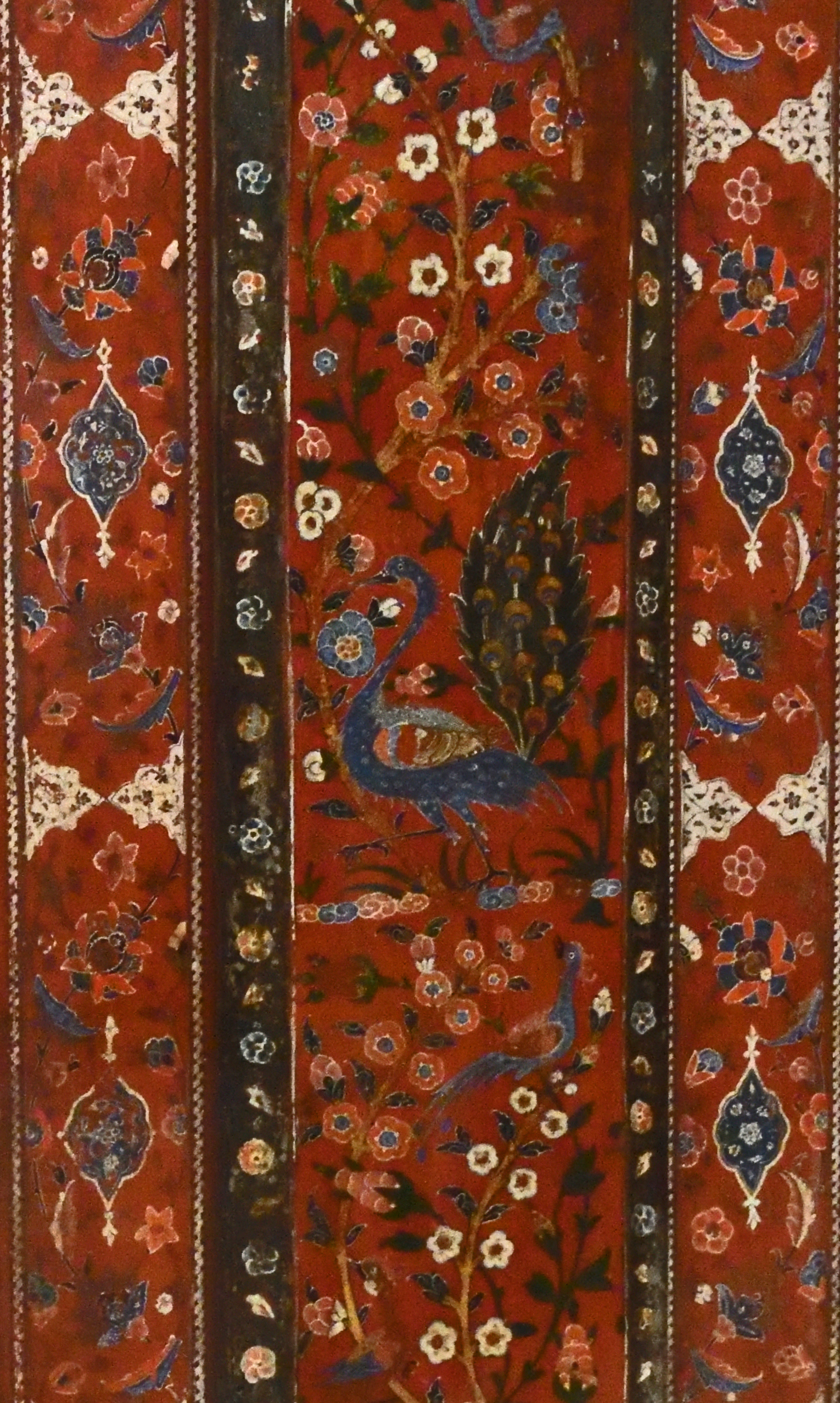
A Detail in Aleppo Room - Pigment painting on wood, the painting shows a peacock

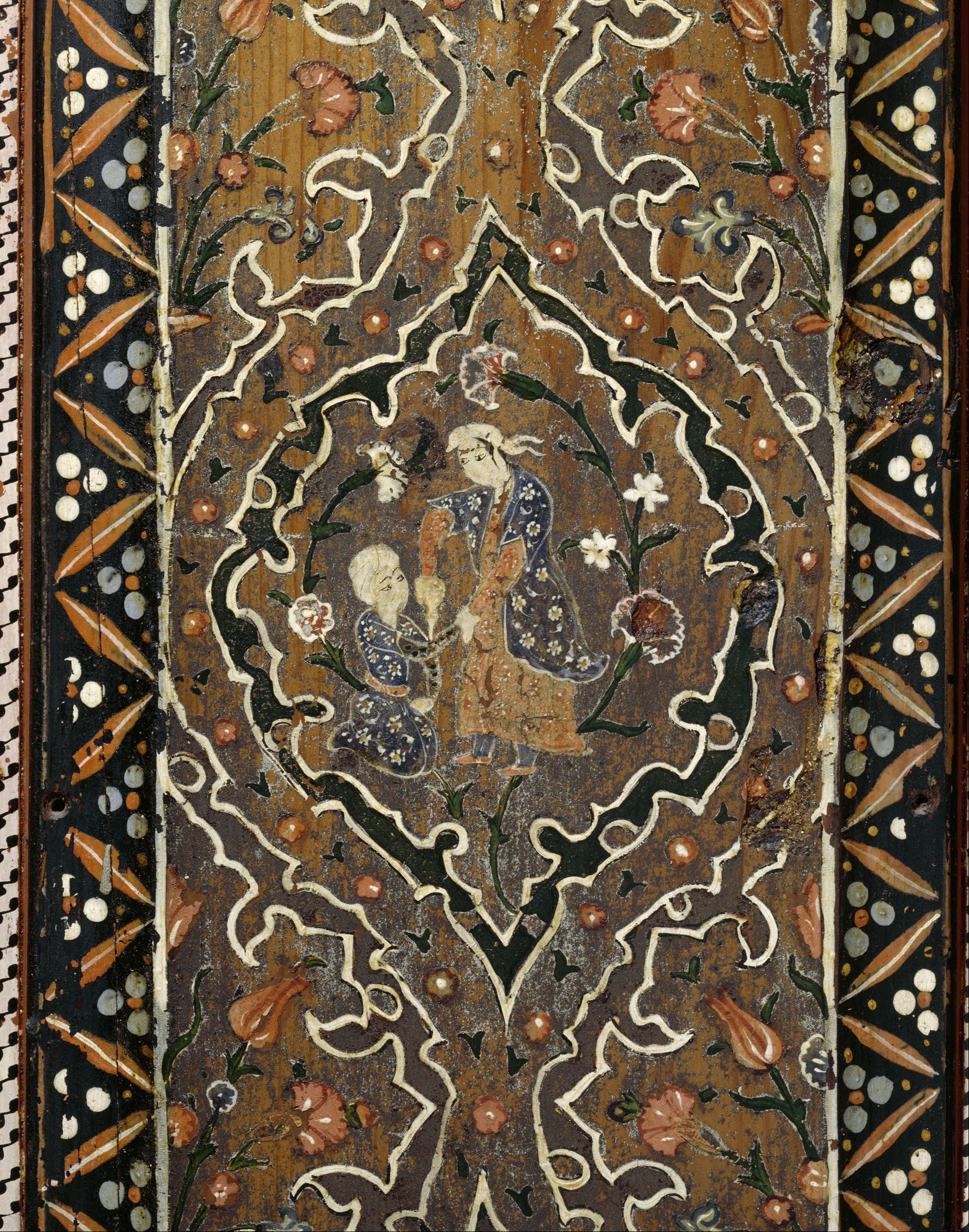
Rose water sprinkling for a kid

== Construction ==
The Aleppo Room in its T-shaped form is 11 m long, 7.5 m wide and 2.95 m high. The panelling is constructed of 10 frames with attached panels, all made of cedar. There are 46 vertical and 10 horizontal in-fills with inscriptions. The frames consist of 15.5 cm broad cedar planks of 2 cm thickness, assembled with mitered mortise and tenon joints. The in-fills, with widths varying from 13 to 41 cm, measure 16 mm in thickness and end with a surrounding cyma. Originally the in-fills were attached with wooden nails. The quality of the wood used attests to the great knowledge of the carpenter, since it was well chosen and seasoned. Both, panels and in-fills were well and precisely burnished with a plane, and a ground was applied. They show very good craftsmanship. It is particularly remarkable that a coniferous wood could be made sufficiently smooth to be capable of providing a ground for lacquer. In European historical sources, it was stipulated that hardwood should be used. The difference of ground preparation of the red-lacquer panels is evident in comparison to the horizontal in-fills with inscriptions. Here the surface of the in-fills is fairly rough, which corresponds to a different painting technique.

There are 14 doors, which served as entrance, lattice blinds and wall-closets. Each of the doors show the same construction: The door frames and profiles are made of walnut and the geometrical in-fills of boxwood. The outer supporting frames are assembled with mortise and tenon joints, while the inner fillings are connected by a plug with geometrical fillings and beads, which is typical of oriental woodwork. The inner in-fills were fitted without glue. The doors are also proof of excellent craftsmanship. They moved on iron hinges, which were originally joined to the lintels.

The upper ending consists of a muqarnas cornice. It is assembled with various components forming the typical stalactite form. The forms fit together with wooden nails and glue and are covered with canvas, which prepared them for painting. In each niche, as well as in the entrance area, are found different types of muqarnas design. Moreover, there are 10 lintels and four lattices, called mashrabiyya in Arabic, which until now had never been exhibited and which had been kept in storage.

In Aleppo, the panelling was presumably fixed directly to the walls. In the museum, in the 1930s, a supporting frame was mounted at the back. This construction still exists today and will be kept as a useful mounting system.

== Painting technique ==
Historic sources on painting techniques of oriental origin are hardly known.

There is an English translation of the Qanun as-Suvar (Canons of Painting), written by Sadiqi Bek around 1576 and 1602. Sadiqi Bek was a royal painter of the Safavid court in Iran. In his manuscript he wrote first about theoretical themes such as the ideals of painting, basic patterns of decorative art, etc. Then he went into more detailed instructions concerning the preparation of colours, gilding, different binding media such as oil varnishes and glue-based media, to mention only some aspects. Sadiqi also stressed the importance of ground preparation, which is not astonishing in comparison to the fine Persian lacquer works of that time.

The second source, Gulistani Hunan (Rose Garden of Art) was an appendix to a text written by Qadi Ahmad, in about 1608. The painting technique is divided into three components in the second publication as follows:

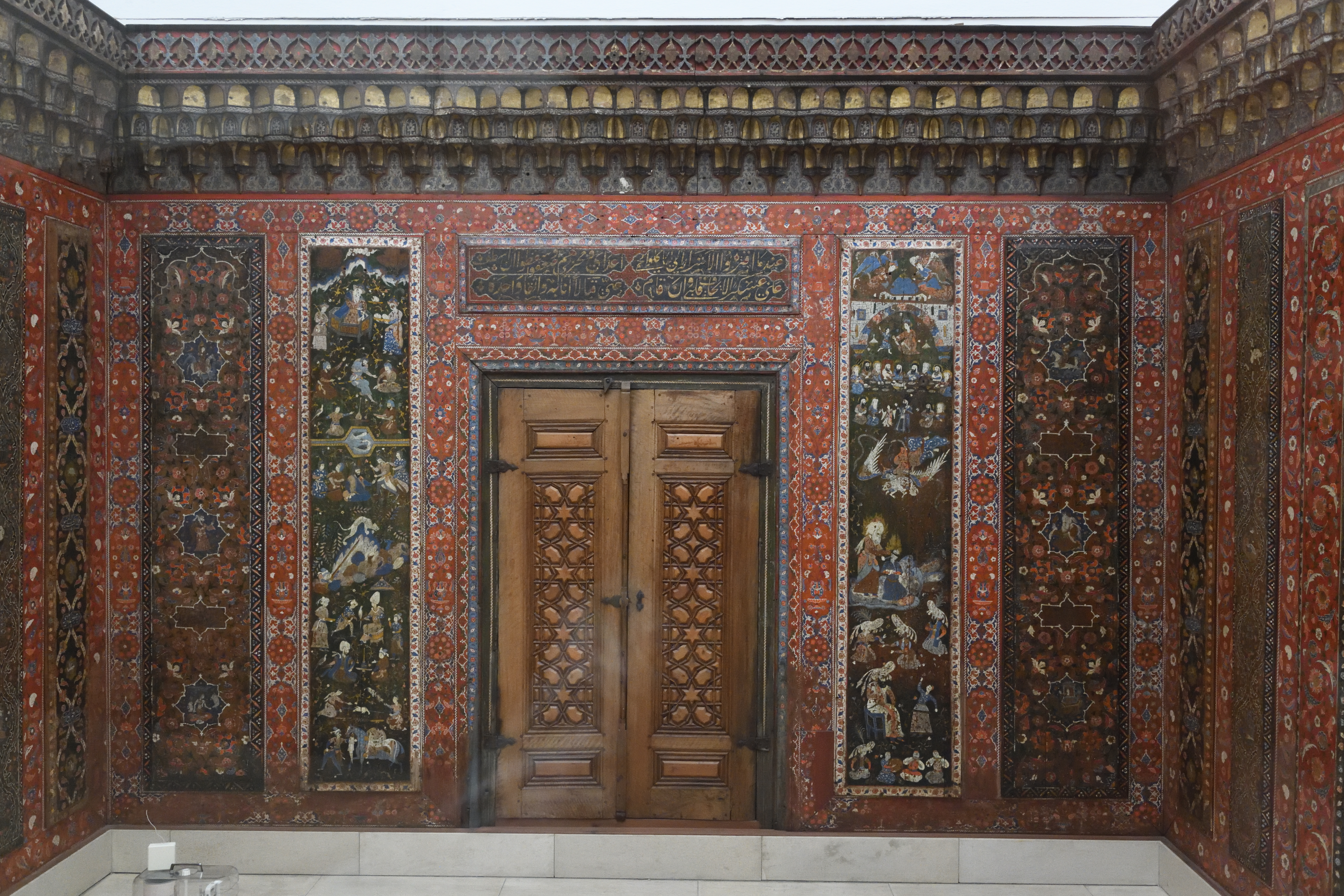
The Aleppo Room paneling

=== Lacquer technique on frames and panels ===
The panels of the Aleppo Room do not have a consistent ground. The artists consciously chose various grounds in relation to the intended colours. We find diverse colours, such as red, blue, white, yellow, green and black in different compositions and varying layers.

=== Tempera technique combined with pastiglia ===
Compared to the lacquer technique on frames and panels, the cornice and horizontal infills are painted in a tempera technique. The ground on both elements is made of gypsum in a proteinaceous binding medium. The ground is very thick on areas that are gilded. On the horizontal in-fills with inscriptions the letters were accented in a pastiglia technique, which is composed of gypsum, white lead and cinnabar in a proteinaceous binding medium. The Arabic word for this technique is al-‘adjami. Then gold leaf was applied and the entire panel was varnished with oil-copal lacquer as a final step. In these horizontal in-fills can be found the only traces of overpainting with smalt on the letters.

=== Transparent coatings on the doors ===
It has to be imagined that the doors were created in a much more elaborate and splendid manner than they appear today. It is possible that they were lacquered in the workshop of the carpenters. They used two different types of translucent lacquer: shellac for the infills, while the frames and profiles were varnished with an oil-copal lacquer. Moreover, the iron fittings of the doors were decorated with tin leaf covered with a so-called gold lacquer. All of this together might have led to a more appropriate decoration within the room: the varied and glossy surface must have emphasized the splendour of the room.

== The room today ==
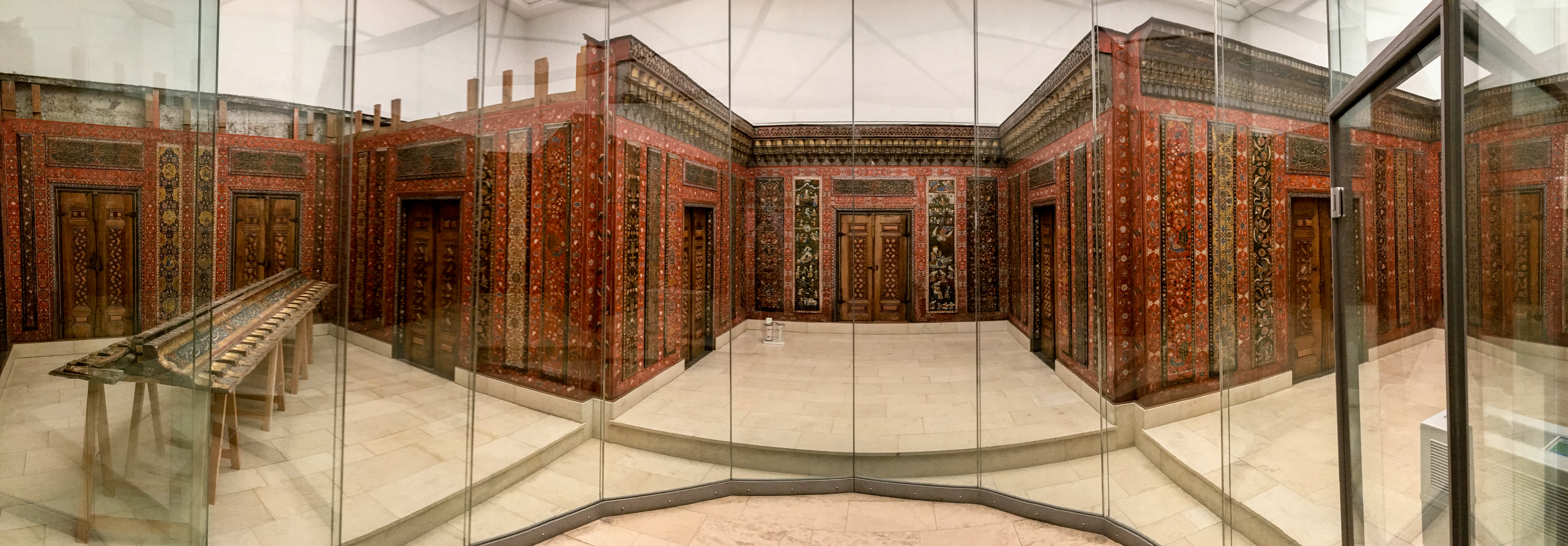
A Panorama View of the Aleppo Room at the Pergamon Museum

According to the director of the Museum of Islamic Art, the room became a symbolic home for Syrians in Germany. "One can see from all the inscriptions and pictures that an environment has been created here in which people of different faiths can find themselves," said Stefan Weber. An Islamic scholar, Weber is the director of the Museum of Islamic Art in Berlin, where the Aleppo Room can be admired. "Many Syrians have come to us. For us it is important to say: 'These objects are here and this is your symbolic home in Germany, if you want."

Table of the Criteria of the Museum object : The Aleppo Room
Name of the Object	Location	Holding Museum	Date of Object	Museum Inventory Number:	Artist(s) / Craftsperson(s):	Material(s) / Technique(s)	Dimensions	Period / Dynasty	Provenance
The Aleppo Room	Berlin, Germany	Museum of Islamic Art at the Pergamon Museum.	Hegira 1009 or 1012 / AD 1600–01 or 1603	I. 2862	Halab Shah ibn Isa	Wood, multi-layered painting using a variety of pigments and metal coatings.	Height 260 cm total length 35 metres	Ottoman	Aleppo, Syria

== Bibliography ==
1. Sauvaget, J. (1941). Alep, essai sur 1e développement d'une grands ville svrienne des origines au milieu du XIX siécle, t.l, Paris.

== See also ==
- Mobilities
