= List of Intangible Cultural Heritage elements in Jordan =

The United Nations Educational, Scientific and Cultural Organisation (UNESCO) intangible cultural heritage elements are the non-physical traditions and practices performed by a people. As part of a country's cultural heritage, they include celebrations, festivals, performances, oral traditions, music, and the making of handicrafts. The "intangible cultural heritage" is defined by the Convention for the Safeguarding of Intangible Cultural Heritage, drafted in 2003 and took effect in 2006. Inscription of new heritage elements on the UNESCO Intangible Cultural Heritage Lists is determined by the Intergovernmental Committee for the Safeguarding of Intangible Cultural Heritage, an organisation established by the convention.

Jordan ratified the convention on 24 March 2006.

== Intangible Cultural Heritage of Humanity ==
+ Transnational element

=== Representative List ===
Name	Image	Year	No.	Description
Cultural space of the Bedu in Petra and Wadi Rum		2008	00122	The cultural space in Petra and Wadi Rum of the Bedouin tribes (Bedul, Ammarin, and Sa'idiyyin).
As-Samer in Jordan		2018	01301	As-Samer consists of dancing and singing performed during the most important ceremonies such as the marriage ceremonies.
Arabic calligraphy: knowledge, skills and practices + (Note: Shared with Algeria, Bahrain, Egypt, Iraq, Kuwait, Lebanon, Mauritania, Morocco, Oman, Palestine, Saudi Arabia, Sudan, Tunisia, United Arab Emirates, and Yemen.)		2021	01718	The artistic practice of writing Arabic letters and words to convey grace and beauty.
Al-Mansaf in Jordan, a festive banquet and its social and cultural meanings		2022	01849	Mansaf (منسف) is a traditional Jordanian dish made of lamb cooked in a sauce of fermented dried yogurt and served with rice or bulgur.
Date palm, knowledge, skills, traditions and practices + (Note: Shared with Bahrain, Egypt, Iraq, Kuwait, Mauritania, Morocco, Oman, Palestine, Qatar, Saudi Arabia, Sudan, Tunisia, United Arab Emirates, and Yemen.)		2022	01902	The palm tree is considered to be a part of the history of the countries where it is a source for farmers, craftsmen, handicrafts owners, merchants, factory owners and food companies.
Henna, rituals, aesthetic and social practices + (Note: Shared with Algeria, Saudi Arabia, Bahrain, Egypt, United Arab Emirates, Iraq, Kuwait, Morocco, Mauritania, Oman, Palestine, Qatar, Sudan, Tunisia, and Yemen.)		2024	02116	A temporary tattooing practice with medicinal and aesthetic motivations.
Arabic coffee, a symbol of generosity + (Note: Shared with Oman, Qatar, Saudi Arabia, and United Arab Emirates.)		2024	02111	Serving qahwa is an important part of hospitality. It is prepared in front of the guests, starting with roasting the beans. It is bitter and served without sugar.
Bisht (men's Abaa): skills and practices + (Note: Shared with Bahrain, Iraq, Kuwait, Oman, Qatar, Saudi Arabia, Syria, and the United Arab Emirates.)		2025	02233	A bisht is a traditional men's cloak popular in the Arab world for hundreds of years.
The zaffa in the traditional wedding + (Note: Shared with Djibouti, Comoros, Iraq, Mauritania, Somalia, and the United Arab Emirates.)		2025	02283	The zaffa, or wedding march, is a musical procession of bendir drums, bagpipes, horns, belly dancers, and men carrying flaming swords.
Al-Mihrass tree: knowledge, skills and rituals associated with it		2025	02276	Al-Mihrass is a type of olive tree notable for its size and age.
Arabic Kohl + (Note: Shared with Iraq, Libya, Oman, Palestine, Saudi Arabia, Syria, Tunisia, and the United Arab Emirates.)		2025	02261	Kohl is a fine black powder used as eyeliner traditionally made by crushing stibnite.

== See also ==
- List of World Heritage Sites in Jordan
