= Russian Pilgrim Residence (Jordan) =

Pilgrim residence for tourists in Al-Maghtas, Jordan

- Architectural drawing of the residence
- Interactive map of the Russian Pilgrim Residence area

General information
- Architectural style: Russian
- Location: Al-Maghtas
- Coordinates: 31°49′53.3″N 35°32′51.3″E
- Year built: 2012
- Groundbreaking: 2007
- Construction started: 2008
- Construction stopped: 2012
- Cost: $40 million

The Russian Pilgrim Residence is a building in Al-Maghtas, Jordan, a UNESCO World Heritage Site where Jesus is believed to have been baptized.

The house was built in the Russian architectural style, with white facades and golden domes, and was inaugurated by president Vladimir Putin in 2012. The Russian government funded the building's construction, which cost around $40 million, with Jordanian government support including land plot donation, and aimed to increase Russian Christian tourism numbers to Jordan.

The pilgrim's house contains 50 double rooms, a prayer hall, a reception hall, and an exclusive opening to the Jordan River for baptisms. There are several other sites in the Maghtas area, including the Armenian, Coptic, Ethiopian, Assyrian and Greek Orthodox churches.

== History ==
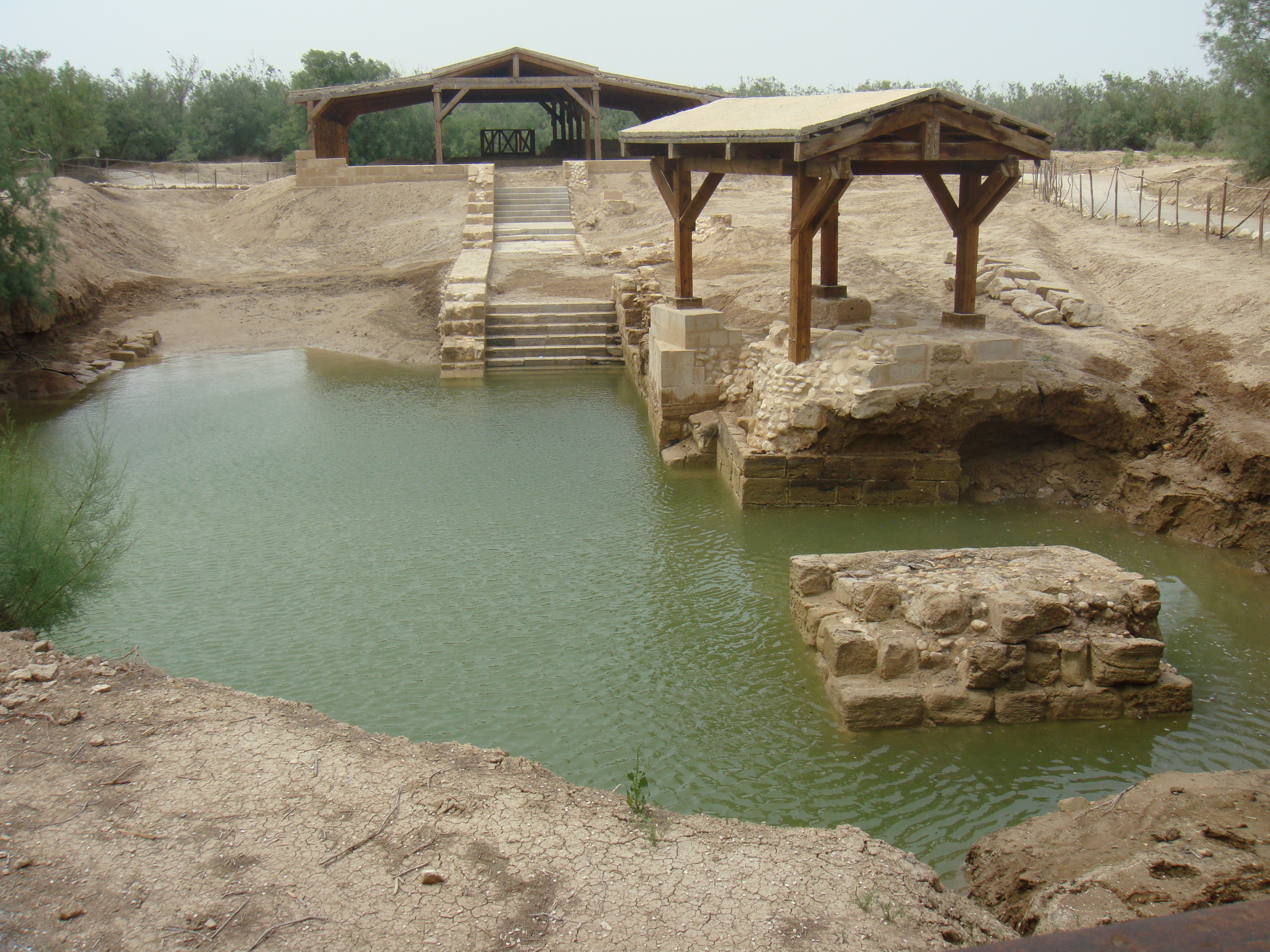
Ruins of Al-Maghtas in Jordan, where Jesus is thought to have been baptized, a UNESCO world heritage site.

During a 2007 visit by then Russian President Vladimir Putin to Al-Maghtas, a UNESCO World Heritage Site where Jesus is believed to have been baptized, the Jordanian government donated a 10 dunum plot of land intended for a Russian Pilgrimage House. The cornerstones were placed in 2008, and the center was inaugurated by Putin in 2012.

During the inauguration ceremony, attended by Jordanian and Russian government officials, Putin thanked King Abdullah II of Jordan for his support to the project: "I thank His Majesty King Abdullah II for his great support for this project, which is of great importance to thousands of Russian pilgrims, stressing that this house will be for all Russian pilgrims coming to the Baptism Site in Al-Maghtas."

The pilgrim's house contains 50 double rooms, two presidential suites, a prayer's hall, a reception hall, and an exclusive opening to the Jordan River for baptisms. The house was built in the Russian architectural style, with white facades and golden domes. The Russian government funded the building's construction which costed around $40 million, and aimed to increase Russian Christian tourism numbers to Jordan.

The Jordan Valley Authority had provided water and electricity supply systems to the residence, as well as connecting it to the main road.

There are several sites in the Maghtas area, including the Armenian, Coptic, Ethiopian, Assyrian and Greek Orthodox churches.

Russian Presidents visit to the site
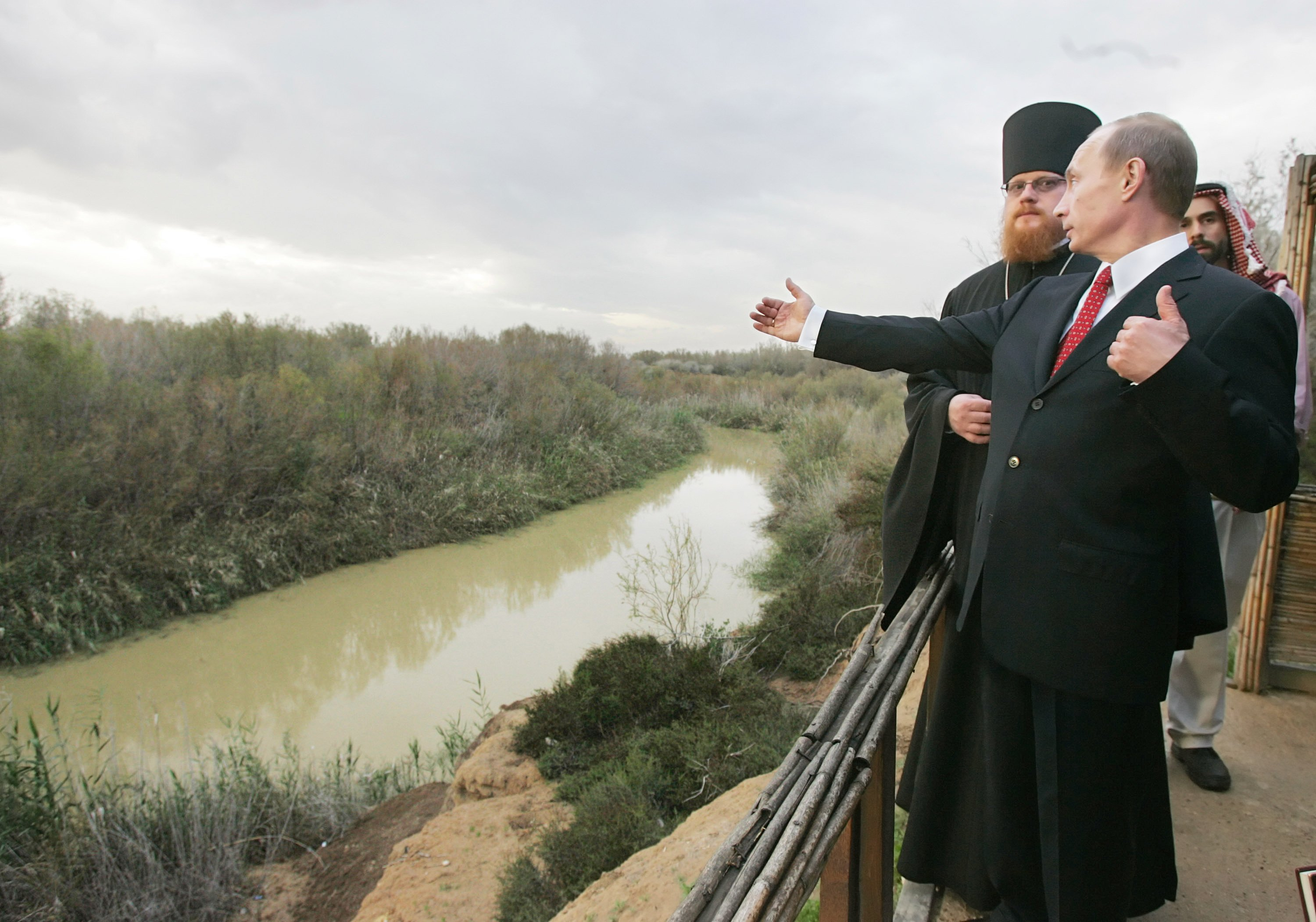
From then President of Russia Vladimir Putin's visit to Al-Maghtas in 2007

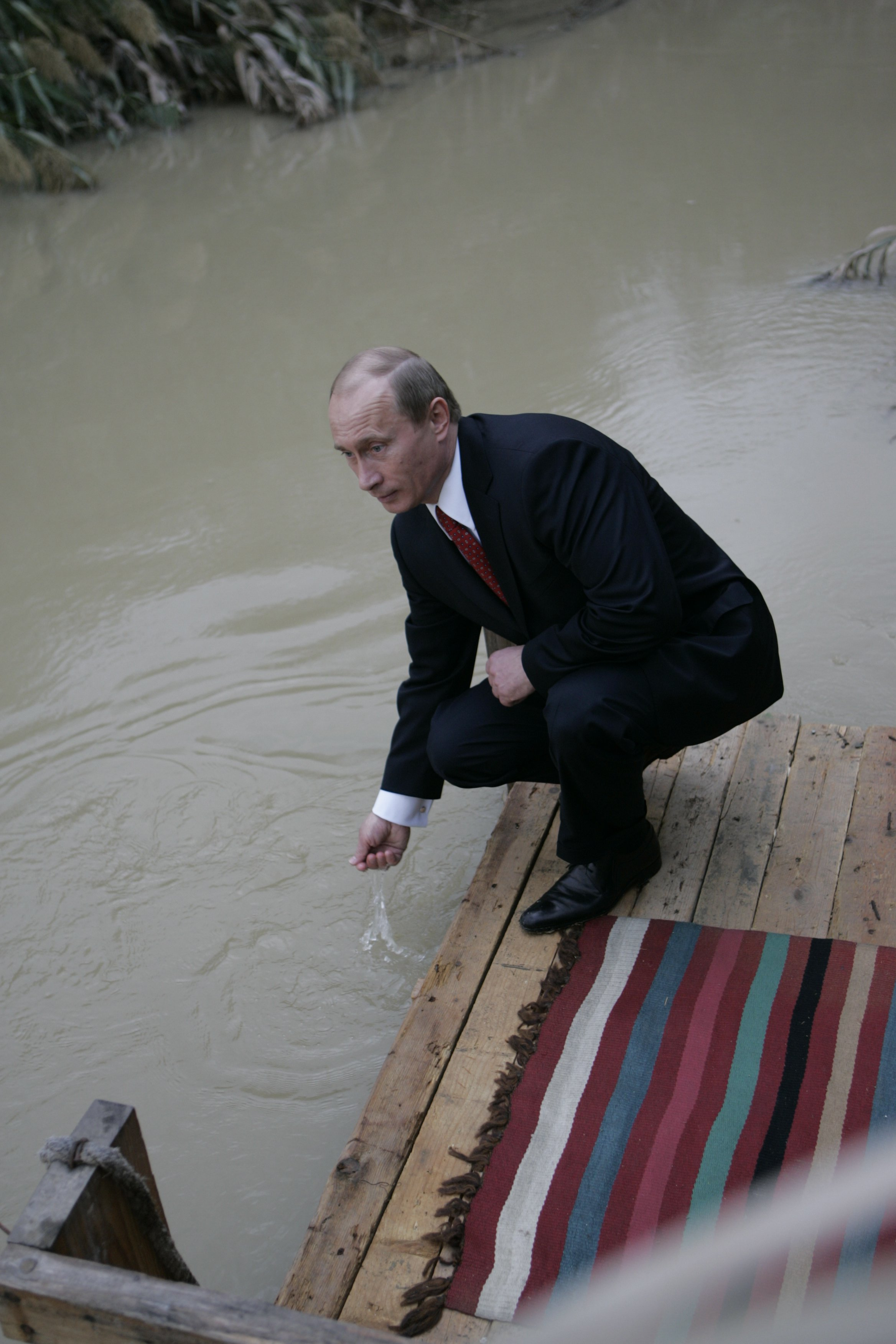
From Putin's visit to the Jordan River's Al-Maghtas area in 2007

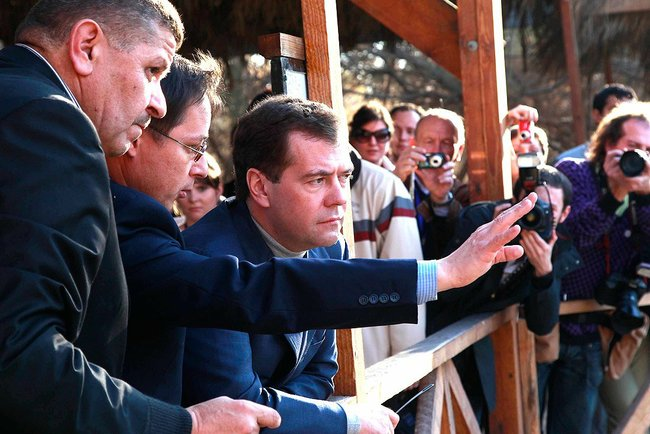
From then President of Russia Dmitry Medvedev's visit to Al-Maghtas in 2011, standing by the Jordan river.

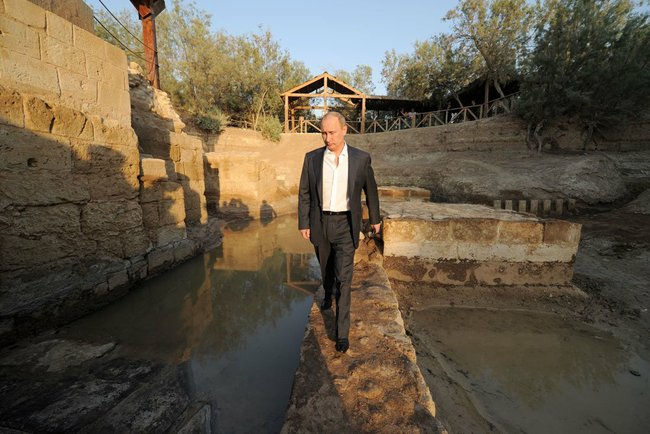
Putin at the ruins of Al-Maghtas baptism site where Jesus was baptized, in 2012

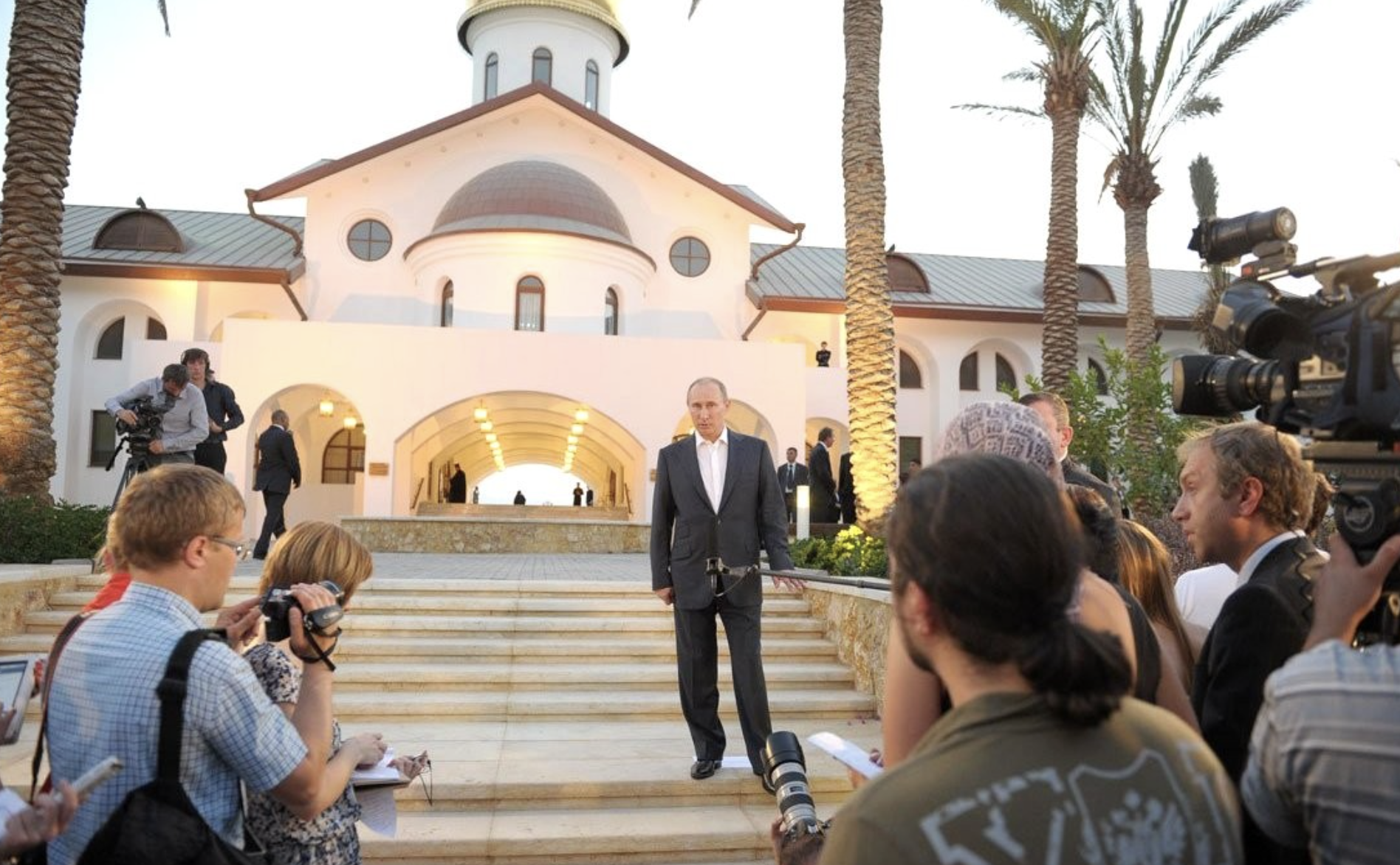
Putin inaugurating the Russian Pilgrim Residence in 2012
