= Sadiqi Beg =

Safavid painter and writer (c. 1533–1610)

- صادقی بیگ
- Born: 1533; Tabriz, Safavid Iran
- Died: 1610 (aged 76–77); Isfahan, Safavid Iran
- Style: Persian
- Writing career
- Language: Chagatai & Persian
- Notable works: Majma’ al-khavass Qanun as-Suwar

Painting shows an Aulad tied to a tree because he is not trusted after helping Rostam, a legendary hero in epics. This painting reflects a stylistic change to Sadiqi Beg's artwork.

Sadiqi Beg (Persian: صادقی بیگ; c. 1533 – 1610), also referred to as Sadiqi Beg Afshar (صادقی بیگ افشار) was a Persian painter, poet, biographer, draftsman, soldier, and miniaturist of the Safavid era. Born in Tabriz in about 1533, he spent a number of years as a wandering dervish before settling in Qazvin where he occupied several positions in the royal court. Ultimately, he was dismissed from a post in the royal library in 1596, and he spent his final years focused on his own writing before his death in Isfahan in 1610.

== Background ==
Sadiqi Beg was born in Tabriz, the historic capital of the Safavid dynasty, into the Khodabandalu Turkoman tribe in 940/1533. He came from a notable line of Turkish soldiers that migrated from Syria to support Shah Ismail I who founded the Safavid dynasty in 1501. His father was assassinated when Sadiqi was young, and, despite his family’s noble history, he was left without an inheritance. Consequently, Sadiqi Beg spent many years as a wandering dervish before deciding to pursue art and poetic science at the age of 32. He moved to Qazvin in 1568 and asked his pupil and nephew Mozaffar Ali, reputedly an incredible figure painter, to teach him the style of the earlier well-known artist, Kamāl ud-Dīn Behzād.

== Royal appointments ==
Sadiqi Beg was initially invited to serve under Shah Isma’il II (r. 1576–1577). Following this brief royal appointment, while Mohammad Khodabanda was in power from 1578 to 1587, he left Qazvin to fight in the Battle of Astarabad (ca. 1581). Following the battle, he lived in the Iranian cities of Hamadan, Lahijan, and Yazd.

He remained absent from the royal court throughout the rule of Mohammad Khodabanda, from 1576 to 1588, and during this time he focused on single page works rather than large-scale manuscripts. Eventually, when Shah Abbas I rose to power in 1581, Sadiqi returned to the court and became head of the royal library in Qazwin. He was highly regarded by royal figures but disliked by his colleagues in the court, and he was dismissed from the library in 1596. However, despite losing this role, he retained the official title and salary and regularly consulted with Shah Abbas I on manuscripts and other royal subjects for the remainder of his life.

== Painting ==
Several pieces attributed to Sadiqi Beg survive in modern museums and private collections, and his work is often characterized by its unique colors, distinct contours, and stiff subjects. Many of his most famous illustrations were created while working in the royal court, and he supervised the creation of several important royal volumes. Prior to Shah Isma’il II’s rule, he contributed a single painting to a copy of Asadi’s Garshāspnāma commissioned by the Safavid ruler Tahmasp. Following this piece, he would go on to illustrate additional royal manuscripts for later rulers.

He heavily contributed to Shah Isma’il II’s Shānāma, and he is credited as the creator of seven of its surviving paintings. Similarly, he painted three pieces for a major Shānāma commissioned by Shah Abbas I. This copy partially survives in the Chester Beatty Library in Dublin, although it remains incomplete and is missing several pages. In addition to his manuscript illustrations, Safavid historian Iskandar Beg Munshi credits Sadiqi Beg with all of the drawing and many of the paintings in Qazvin’s royal palace and the assembly hall in Čhehel Sotūn.

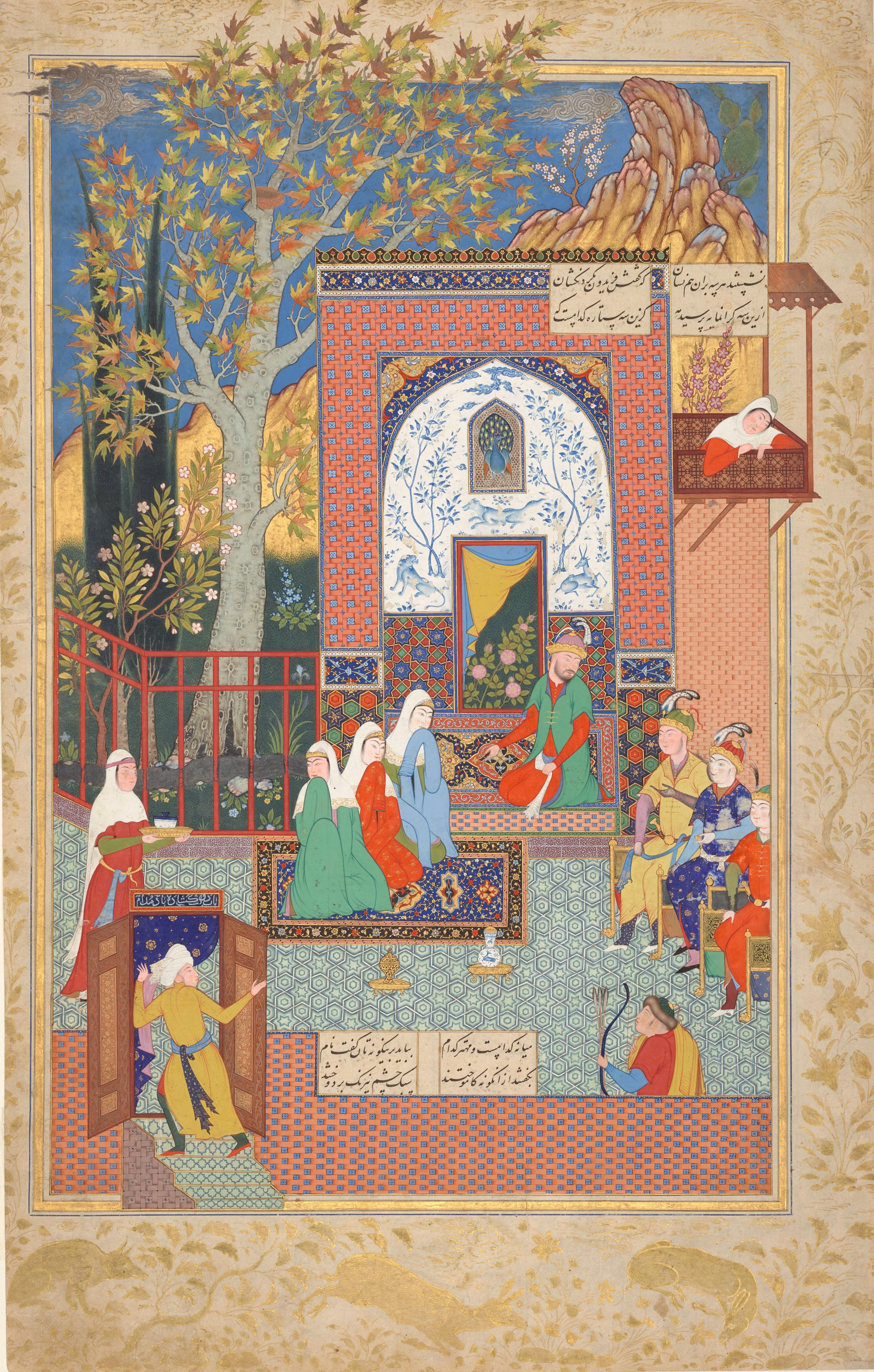
Fereydun’s sons meet King Sarv of Yemen and his daughters. The Shahnameh of Shah Abbas I. Chester Beatty Library

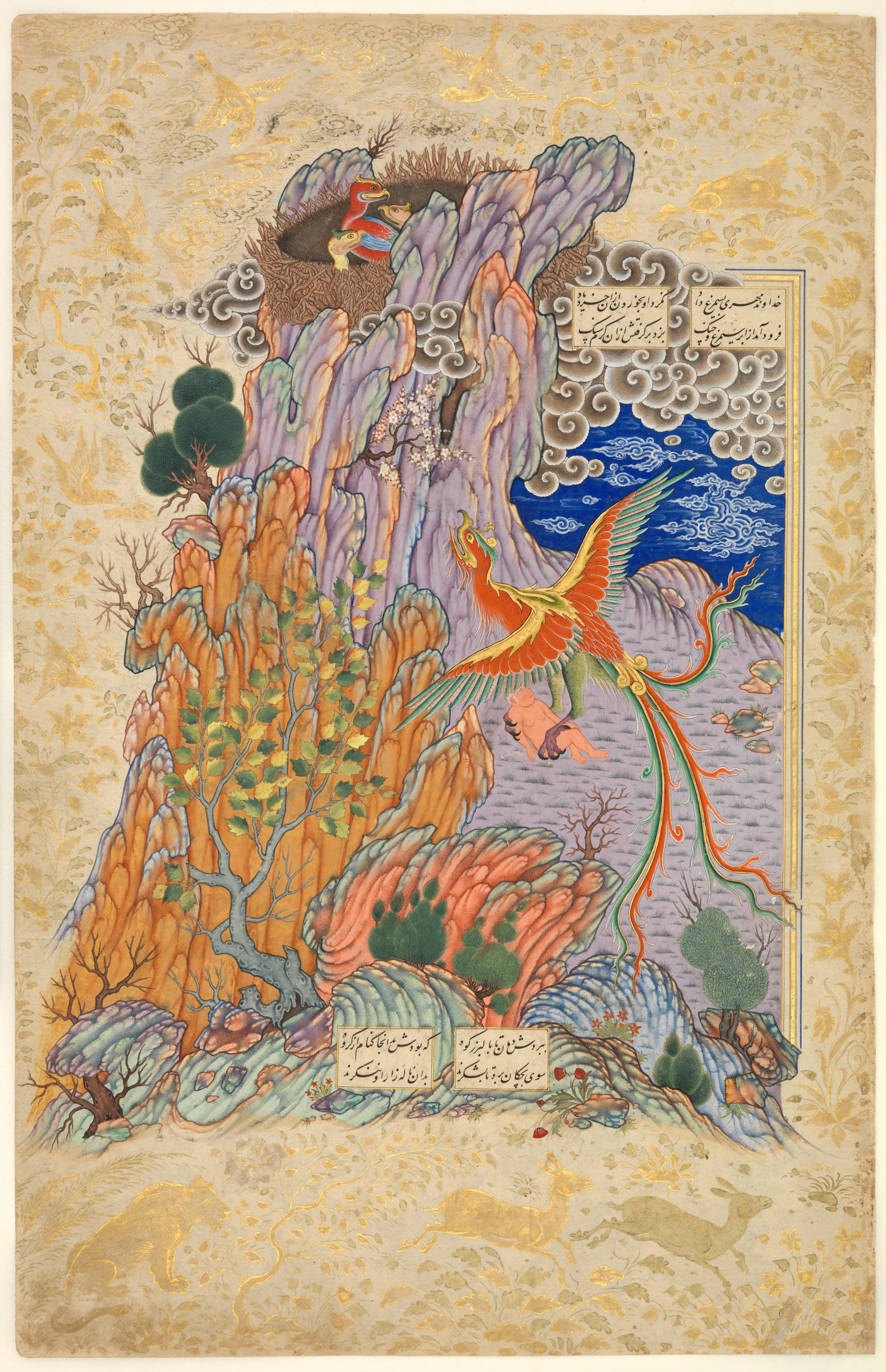
Zal Rescued by the Simurgh. The Shahnameh of Shah Abbas I. Chester Beatty Library

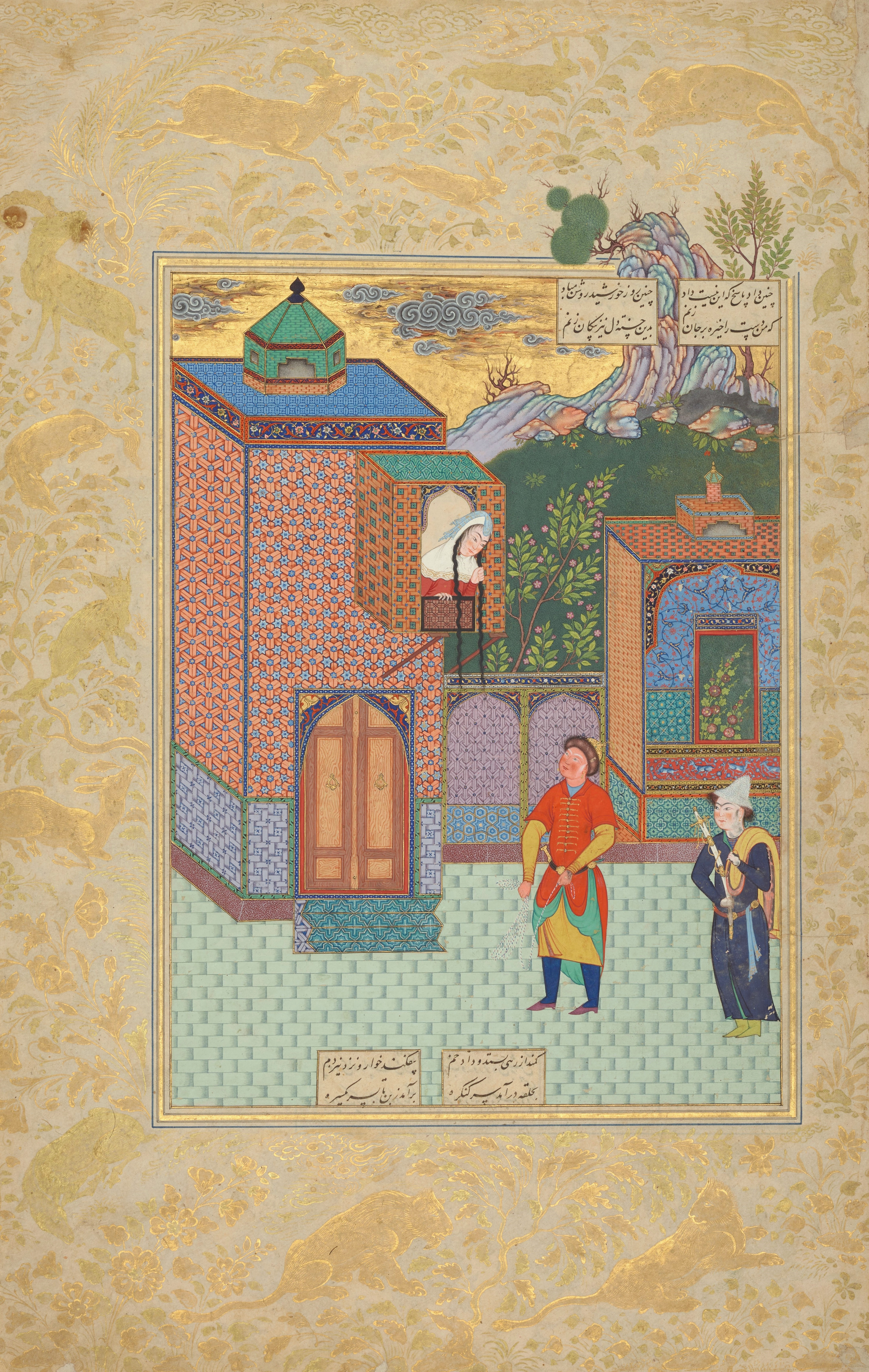
Rudaba lets down her hair for Zal. The Shahnameh of Shah Abbas I. Chester Beatty Library

In 1593, just before leaving his royal employ, Sadiqi Beg personally commissioned and illustrated a copy of Kashifi’s Anvār-I Suhaylī (Lights of Canopus). The volume included 107 drawings, possibly all by Sadiqi himself, and it demonstrates his personal investment in the arts. Some scholars such as B. W. Robinson attribute these miniatures exclusively to Sadiqi, although others, such as Basil Gray, believe they belong to several artists. However, it remains likely that he commissioned this work with personal funds. The manuscript, in the collection of the Marquess of Bute, is inscribed to "Sadiqi Beg, the rarity of the age, the second Mani, the Bihzad of the time."

He was also known for popularizing the Iranian "calligraphic style of drawing." This method is evident in works such as Dragon and Clouds (ca. 1600) which is currently held by the Metropolitan Museum of Art. Examples of Sadiqi's work survive in several museums and private collections, and they are highly valued instances of Safavid era artwork. In 1996, a gouache miniature on gold paper, Portrait d'une jeune femme assise sur un rocher (1590), attributed to Sadiqi, sold at auction in Paris for 80,000 French francs (15,792 U.S. dollars; 12,604 euros; or 10,301 British pounds).

== Writing ==
Sadiqi's native language was Chaghatai, however he was proficient in two additional Turkish literary languages. The Majma’ al-khavass (Lives of Artists) is considered one of his most important written works, and it provides biographical sketches of some of the era's leading poets, artists and connoisseurs. This work was inspired by Turkish poets Ali-Shir Nava’i, Baki, and Fuzuli, and it includes biographies of 330 poets alongside samples of their work. Furthermore, the Majma’ al-khavass is split into eight sections and includes details on contemporary rulers, Turkish Statesmen, and Persian Poets.

In addition to this piece, he wrote the famous Qanun as-Suwar (Canons of Painting) between 1576 and 1602. This work is a treatise on painting techniques published in Persian verse, and he reportedly "painted thousands of marvelous portraits." Sadiqi Beg’s writings are an important tool for interpreting historical Persian miniature paintings as he details styles and provides instruction for making art. His Persian writing style was inspired by classic Persian artists, including Khaqani, Ẓahīr, Kamal od-Din Esmail, and Saadi Shirazi. Uniquely, historians note that he avoided politics by abstaining from using religious denominations to refer to different techniques in his art, and he used classical styles while critiquing contemporary practices.

== Sources ==
- Necipoğlu, Gülru (2016). "Early Modern Floral: The Agency of Ornament i Ottoman and Safavid Visual Cultures". In Necipoğlu, Gülru; Payne, Alina (eds.). Histories of Ornament: From Global to Local. Princeton University Press. pp. 132–155.
- Gray, Basil (1986). "The Arts in the Safavid Period". In Jackson, Peter; Lockhart, Lawrence (eds.). The Cambridge History of Iran. Vol. 6:The Timurid and Safavid Periods. Cambridge University Press. pp. 877–912.
