= Aqaba Marine Reserve =

Protected area of the Red Sea

Coordinates: 29°25′50″N 34°58′19″E

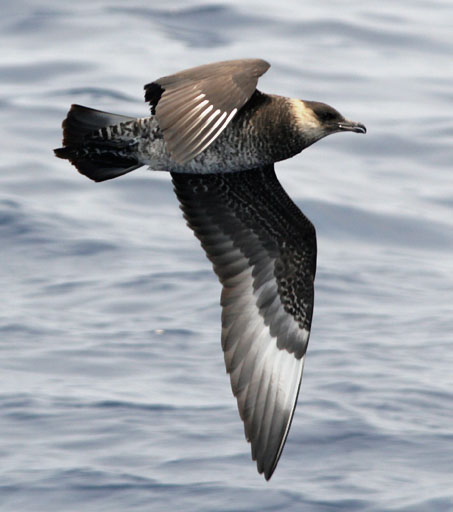
- Interactive map of Aqaba Marine Reserve

UNESCO World Heritage Site
- Criteria: Natural: ix, x
- Reference: 1742
- Inscription: 2026 (48th Session)
- Area: 701 ha
- Buffer zone: 2,322 ha

Aqaba Marine Reserve is a nature reserve located in the Aqaba Governorate, Jordan, established in 1997, covers an area of 2.8 square kilometers. This reserve is considered a habitat for important marine life, such as seagrass. It is known for its distinctive fish diversity and coral diversity. The marine park has numerous recorded waterbirds, especially gulls, terns, and skuas.

== Description ==
The reserve is home to 300 species of hard and soft coral, 512 species of various fish, 3 types of seagrass beds, and two main types of shallow seagrass communities, ranging from half a meter to 40 meters in depth. The annual rainfall is about 30 mm, and the temperature ranges from 14°C in winter to 32°C in summer, with a maximum of up to 50°C. The humidity ranges between 30–55%, and the climate is dry.

== History ==
The Gulf of Aqaba is Jordan’s only maritime outlet to the Red Sea, with Jordan owning only 27 km of the total 160 km of coastline. Despite the limited coastline, it experiences intense economic and tourist activity. Environmental expert emphasizes the importance of protecting part of this coastline due to the presence of various marine species. The establishment of the marine reserve is an opportunity to include it within the important environmental areas recognized by the International Union for Conservation of Nature, reflecting Jordan's commitment to international agreements for the protection of marine environments.

In 2026, UNESCO designated the reserve as a World Heritage Site.

== Design ==
The marine reserve spans an area of 2.45 square kilometers with a coastline of 7 km out of the total 27 km, covering approximately 2.6% of Jordan’s marine area. It extends 350 meters from the shore towards the sea and 50 meters towards the land. The reserve includes 157 species of hard corals, 15 unique species, 18 genera of algae, 3 types of seagrass, 507 species of fish, and 3 species of turtles, including the hawksbill sea turtle. The reserve also contains two endangered species of giant clams, 72 species of sponges, and 645 species of mollusks.

The reserve is considered one of the most biologically diverse areas in the region, featuring scattered coral reefs close to the shore that extend over a distance of 13 km.
