= Pergamon Museum =

Museum in Berlin, Germany

- Pergamonmuseum
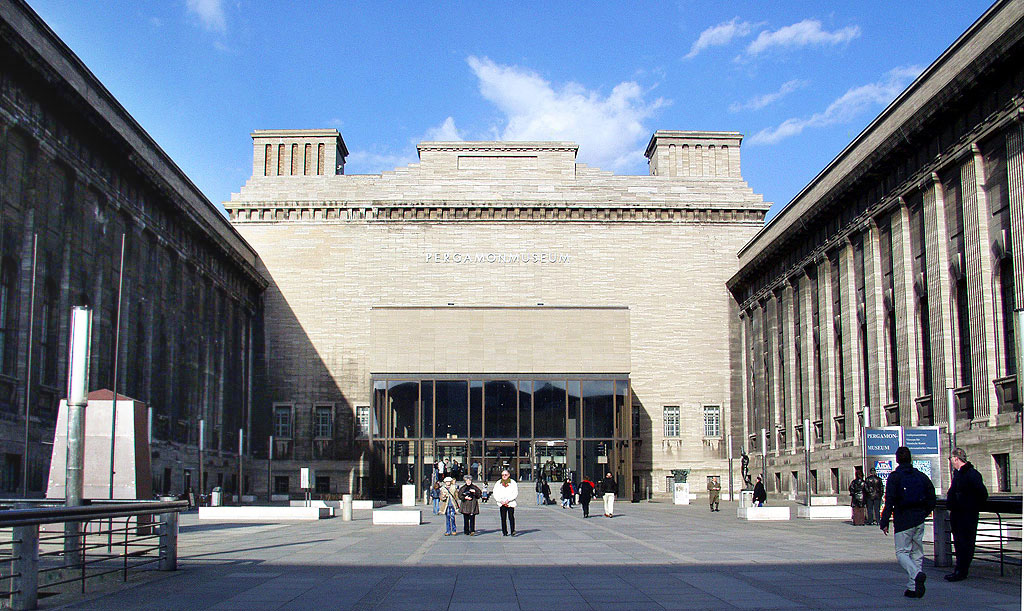
- Entrance area
- Established: 1930
- Location: Museum Island, Berlin, Germany
- Coordinates: 52°31′16″N 13°23′46″E
- Type: Archaeology museum
- Public transit access: U: Museumsinsel
- Website: smb.museum/pergamonmuseum

UNESCO World Heritage Site
- Part of: Museumsinsel (Museum Island), Berlin
- Criteria: Cultural: ii, iv
- Reference: 896
- Inscription: 1999 (23rd Session)
- Area: 8.6 ha (21 acres)
- Buffer zone: 22.5 ha (56 acres)

The Pergamon Museum (German: Pergamonmuseum; pronounced [ˈpɛʁ.ɡa.mɔn.muˌzeː.ʊm]) is a listed building on the Museum Island in the historic centre of Berlin, Germany. It was built from 1910 to 1930 by order of Emperor Wilhelm II and according to plans by Alfred Messel and Ludwig Hoffmann in Stripped Classicism style. As part of the Museum Island complex, the Pergamon Museum was added to the UNESCO World Heritage List in 1999 because of its architecture and testimony to the evolution of museums as architectural and social phenomena.

Prior to its closing in 2023, the Pergamon Museum was home to the Antikensammlung, including the famous Pergamon Altar, the Vorderasiatisches Museum and the Museum für Islamische Kunst.

In October 2023, the museum was completely closed for visitors, and is expected to remain mostly closed for 14 to 20 years – until 2037 to 2043 – for the execution of comprehensive renovation works. Its North Wing is expected to reopen in 2027.

== Origin ==
By the time the Kaiser-Friedrich-Museum on Museum Island (today the Bode Museum) had opened in 1904, it was clear that the space was not large enough to host all of the art and archaeological treasures being excavated by archeologists or captured by soldiers.

Excavations were underway in the areas of ancient Babylon, Uruk, Assur, Miletus, Priene and ancient Egypt, and objects from these sites could not be properly displayed within the existing German museum system. Additionally, the Ottoman Empire had come under immense financial and political pressure from the late 18th century onwards, and relied upon German and British economic support. Some authors posit that this allowed archeologists such as Carl Humann to excavate sites and return the findings to Germany without following due legal process.

Wilhelm von Bode, director of the Kaiser-Friedrich-Museum, initiated plans to build a new museum nearby to accommodate ancient architecture, German post-antiquity art, and Middle Eastern and Islamic art.

Alfred Messel began a design for the large three-wing building in 1906. After his death in 1909 his friend Ludwig Hoffmann took charge of the project and construction began in 1910, continuing during the First World War (1914-1918) and the great inflation of the 1920s. The completed building was opened in 1930.

The Pergamon Museum was severely damaged during the air attacks on Berlin at the end of the Second World War. Many of the display objects had been stored in safe places, and some of the large exhibits were walled in for protection. In 1945, the Red Army collected all of the unattended museum items, either as war booty or to steal them while the fires were raging in Berlin. Not until 1958 were most of the objects returned to East Germany. Significant parts of the collection remain in Russia. Some are currently stored in the Pushkin Museum in Moscow and the Hermitage Museum in Saint Petersburg. The return of these items has been arranged in a treaty between Germany and Russia but, as of June 2003, is blocked by Russian restitution laws.

== Exhibition ==
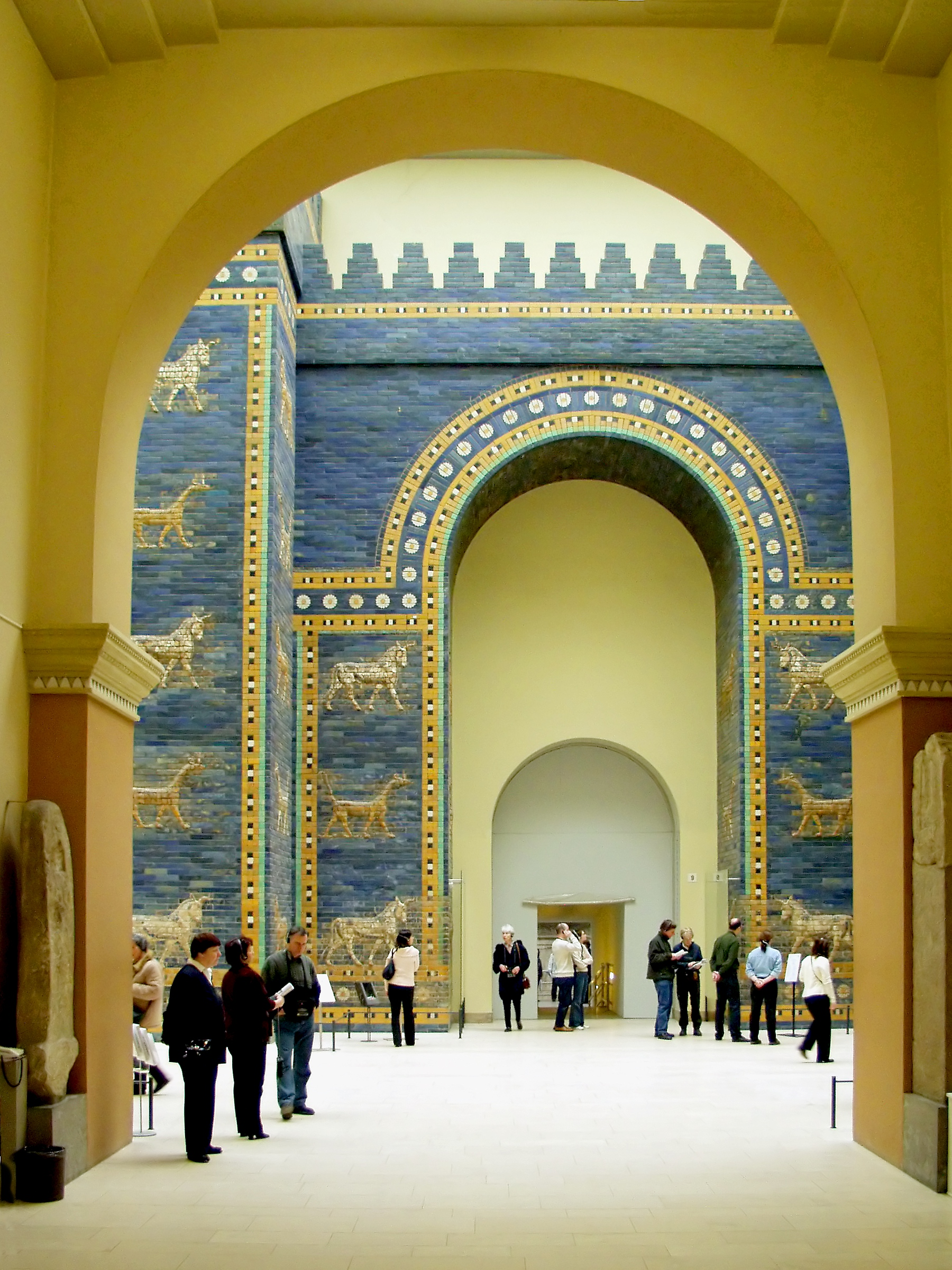
Ishtar Gate

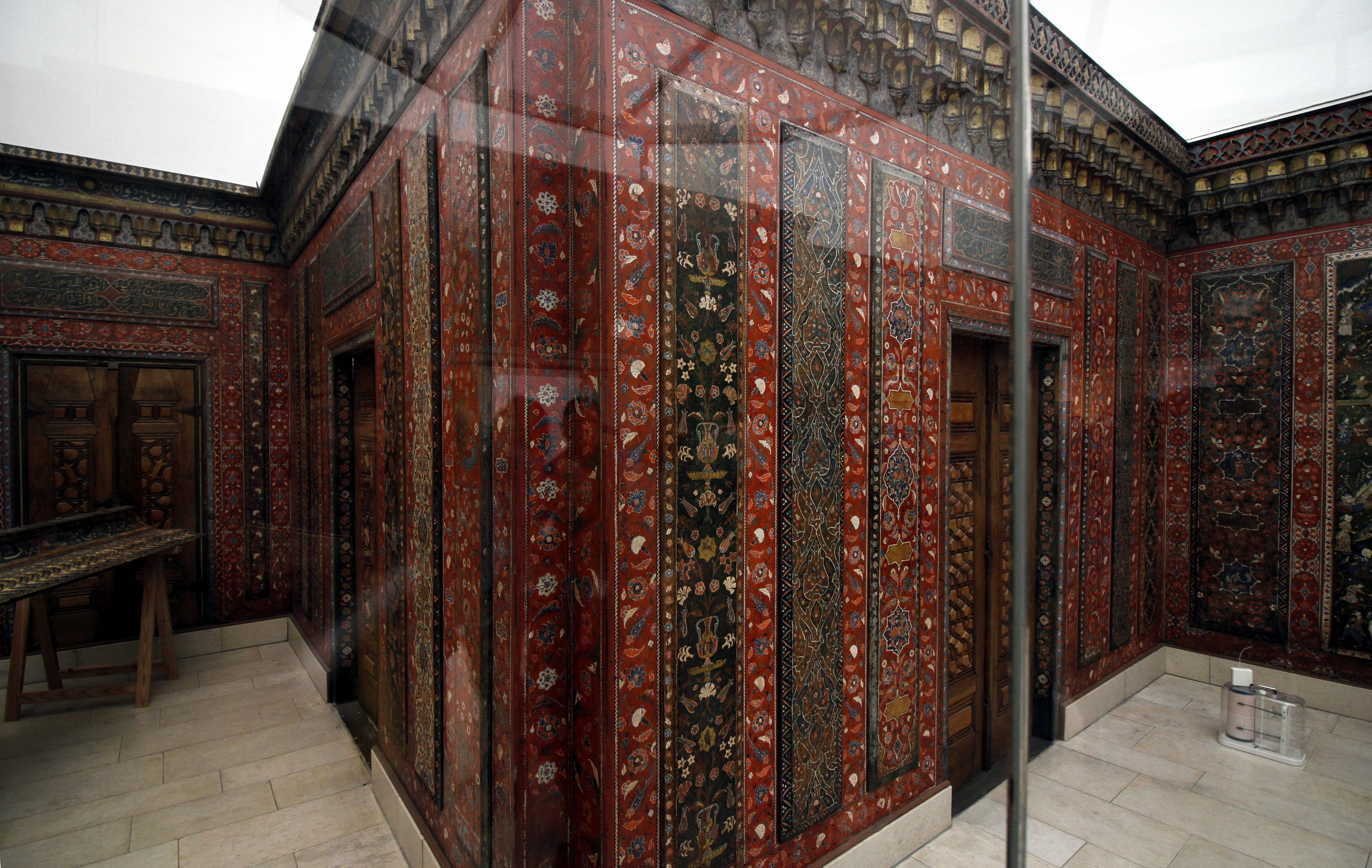
Aleppo Room

Among the pieces the museum displays are:

- The Pergamon Altar
- The Market Gate of Miletus
- The Ishtar Gate and the Processional Way, Babylon
- The Mshatta Facade
- The Meissner fragment from the Epic of Gilgamesh

=== Antiquity Collection (Antikensammlung) ===
The collection goes back to the prince-electors of Brandenburg, who collected objects from antiquity; the collection began with an acquisition by a Roman archaeologist in 1698. It first became accessible (in part) to the public in 1830, when the Altes Museum was opened. The collection expanded greatly with excavations in Olympia, Samos, Pergamon, Miletus, Priene, Magnesia, Cyprus, and Didyma.

This collection is divided between the Pergamon Museum and the Altes Museum.

The collection contains sculpture from the archaic to Hellenistic ages as well as artwork from Classical antiquity: architecture, sculptures, inscriptions, mosaics, bronzes, jewelry and pottery.

The main exhibits are the Pergamon Altar from the 2nd century BC, with a 113-metre (371 ft) long sculptural frieze depicting the struggle of the gods and the giants, and the Gate of Miletus from Roman antiquity.

As Germany was divided following the Second World War, so was the collection. The Pergamon Museum was reopened in 1959 in East Berlin, while what remained in West Berlin was displayed in Schloss Charlottenburg.

=== Islamic Art Museum (Museum für Islamische Kunst) ===
The Islamic Department was part of the Kaiser-Friedrich-Museum which opened in 1904. In the newly built Pergamon Museum, the museum moved into the upper floor of the south wing and was opened there in 1932.

=== The Middle East Museum (Vorderasiatisches Museum) ===
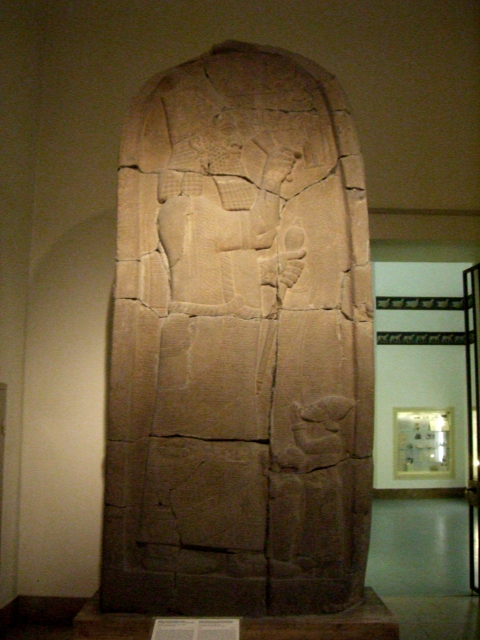
Victory stele of Esarhaddon

The Middle East Museum exhibition displays objects found by German archeologists and others from the areas of Assyrian, Sumerian, and Babylonian culture. Additionally there are historical buildings, reliefs and lesser cultural objects and jewelry.

The main display is the Ishtar Gate and the Processional Way of Babylon along with the throne room facade of Nebuchadnezzar II.

The Vorderasiatisches Museum also displays the Meissner fragment from the Epic of Gilgamesh.

== Plans ==
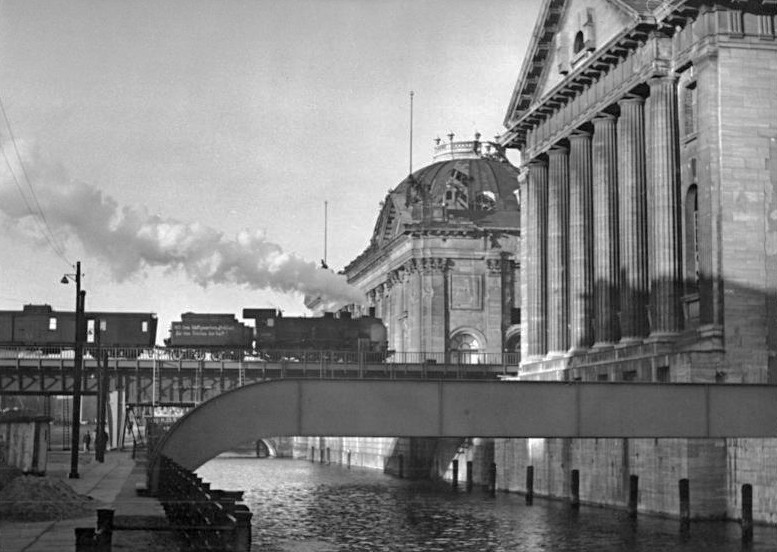
Museum Island with Pergamon Museum and Bode Museum (1951)

The comprehensive plan for Museum Island includes an expansion of the Pergamon Museum, with connections to the Neues Museum, Bodemuseum, Alte Nationalgalerie and a new visitor centre, the James Simon Gallery.

An architectural competition in 2000 was won by Oswald Mathias Ungers from Cologne. The Pergamon Museum will be redeveloped according to his plan, which controversially proposes large alterations to buildings unchanged since 1930. The current entrance building in the Court of Honor will be replaced with a fourth wing, and an underground walk (Archäologische Promenade, archeologic walk) will connect four of the five museums.

From September 2014 up to October 2023, the museum was partially closed for renovation. The hall containing Pergamon Altar will remain closed to the general public. Initially the reopening was scheduled for 2019. In November 2016, it was revealed that the estimated project costs would almost double to 477 million euros. Two pump houses built in the ground during the initial construction between 1910 and 1930 had been discovered causing rising costs and delays. At least 60 million euros of the increased costs are directly due to the fact that construction costs had risen since the original estimate 10 years ago. The Pergamon altar hall was not expected to reopen until at least 2025.

In 2018 a temporary exhibition space just outside Museum Island and a short distance from Pergamon Museum was opened, housing a panorama of the ancient city by the Berlin-based artist Yadegar Asisi, a 3D reconstruction of the famous Pergamon altar by the Fraunhofer Institute for Computer Graphics Research and parts of the altar including the Telephos Frieze.

As part of the Museum Island Master Plan, the Pergamon Museum underwent renovation in October 2023. It will remain closed for 14 to 20 years, with a partial reopening in 2027.

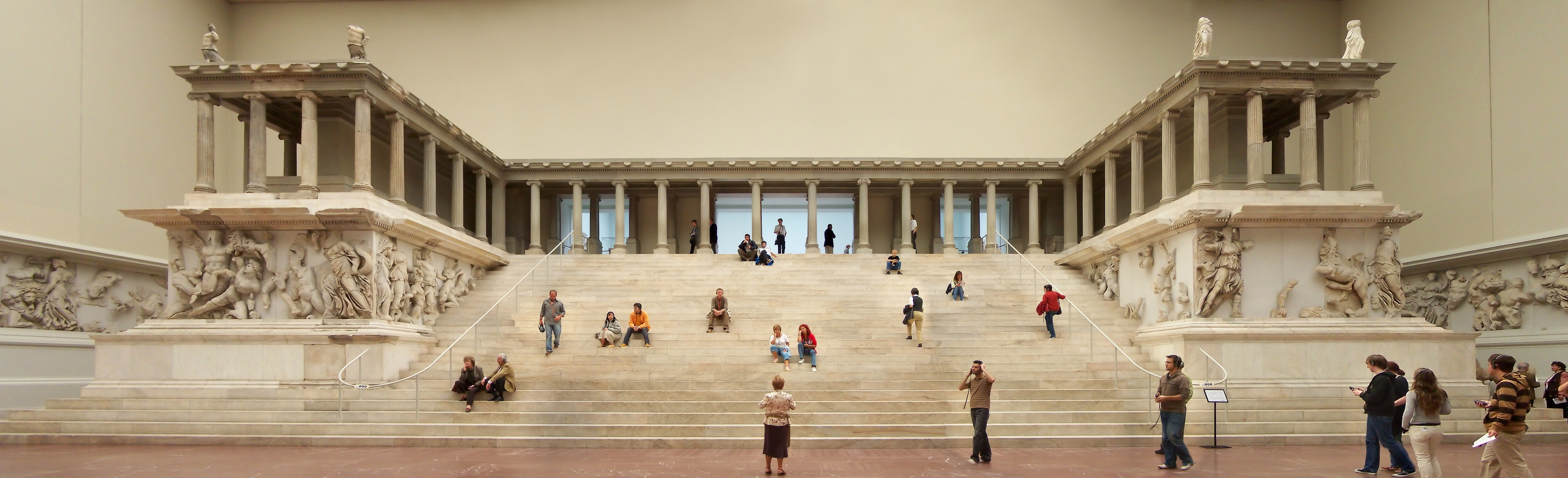
Pergamon Altar

== See also ==
- Aleppo room
- List of art museums
- List of museums in Germany
