= Pilgrim Haus =

Hotel Pilgrim Haus
- Industry: Hotel
- Founded: 1304
- Headquarters: Jakobistraße 75, 59494 Soest (Soest district), Germany
- Website: www.pilgrimhaus.de

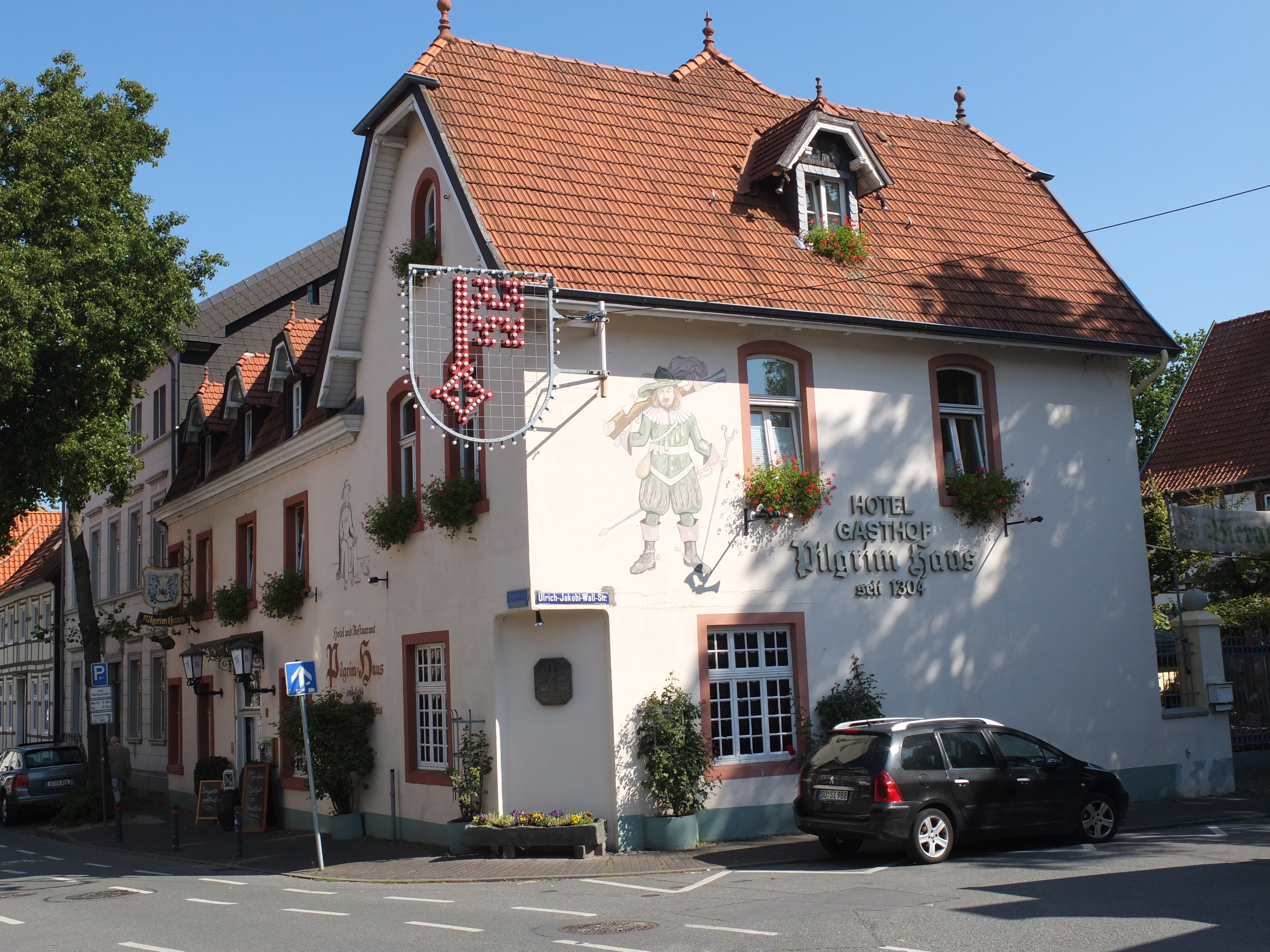
Pilgrim Haus near the Jakobitor

Pilgrim House is a traditional hotel and restaurant in Soest city, North Rhine-Westphalia, Germany. It was founded in 1304, and used mainly by pilgrims on Camino de Santiago.

In February 2005, the 700-year-old Pilgrimhaus was the official monument of the month in North Rhine-Westphalia.

== See also ==
- List of oldest companies
