= Samara (disambiguation) =

Samara is a city on the eastern bank of the Volga in Russia.

Samara may also refer to:

== Geography ==
=== Russia ===
- Samara Oblast, the federal subject surrounding the city
- Samara Bend, the largest bend of the Volga
- Samara Reservoir, an informal name of Kuybyshev Reservoir on the Volga
- Samara (Volga), a left tributary of the Volga
- Neu Samara Colony, a former Mennonite colony in the Orenburg region

=== Ukraine ===
- Samara (Dnieper), a left tributary of the Dnieper
- Samarskyi District, an urban district of the city of Dnipro

=== Elsewhere ===
- Sámara, a beach town in Costa Rica
- Samara, the old name of the Somme River, France
- Samara (Mexico City), a mixed-use development in Mexico City, Mexico
- Sămara, a village in Poiana Lacului Commune, Argeș County, Romania
- Samara (house), a house in West Lafayette, Indiana, United States
- Samara, alternative name of Smara, a city in Western Sahara

== Biology ==
- Samara (fruit), winged seeds found on maples, elms and other trees
- Samara, a synonym of the plant genus Embelia

== People ==
- Samara (given name)
- Samara (surname)
- Samara is also the feminine form of the Greek surname Samaras

== Media ==
=== Films ===
- Samara (1956 film), Arabic language Egyptian film
- Samara (1995 film) ("war"), an Indian Kannada-language film
- Samara (2023 film), an Indian science-fiction film

=== Album ===
- Samara, a 1976 album by French composer Saint-Preux

=== Fictional characters ===
- Samara Morgan, the main antagonist of the 2002 film The Ring
- Samara (Mass Effect), a character in the Mass Effect series
- Samara-simha, a character in the 11th-century Indian story collection Shringara-manjari-katha

== Other ==
- Samara culture, an eneolithic (Copper Age) culture located in the Samara Bend region in modern-day Russia
- Lada Samara, a model of Lada automobile named after the city
- Samara flag, a 19th-century Bulgarian flag
- Samara Flag Monument, a monument in Stara Zagora, Bulgaria
- Samara (charitable organisation), a non-partisan advocacy group for political and civic engagement in Canada

== See also ==
- Samar (disambiguation)
- Samaria (disambiguation)
- Samra (disambiguation)
- Samsara (disambiguation)
- Samarra, an ancient city in Iraq
- Smara, Western Sahara
- Somara (disambiguation)
