= Somara, Hebron =

Village in Hebron Governorate, Palestine

Somara, Hebron Arabic: سومرة
- Somara, Hebron
- Location of Somara, Hebron within Palestine
- Coordinates: 31°24′58″N 34°56′06″E
- Country: Palestine
- Governorate: Hebron Governorate
- Elevation: 600 m (2,000 ft)

Population (2017)
  - Total: 244

Somara is a Palestinian village in the Hebron Governorate, located near Ad-Dhahiriya in the southern West Bank.

== Geography ==
It is located 20 km southwest of the city of Hebron. It is approximately 600 meters above sea level. It is bordered to the east by the lands of Ad-Dhahiriya, to the west by the villages of Al-Bireh and al-Burj to the south by the lands of al-Ramadin, and to the north by the lands of Dura.

== Population ==
The village's population in 2017 was approximately (244) people, according to the Palestinian Central Bureau of Statistics.

== See also ==
- Hebron Governorate
- Ad-Dhahiriya
