= Samar (disambiguation) =

Samar is an island in the Visayas group in the Philippines.

Samar may also refer to:

== People ==
- Samar (name)

== Places ==
=== The Philippines ===
- Samar (historical province), a former province (1768-1965) largely coterminous within the island of Samar comprising what are now the present-day provinces of (Western) Samar, Northern Samar and Eastern Samar
  - Samar (province), formerly Western Samar, a province of the Philippines that occupies the western three-quarters of the island of Samar
  - Northern Samar province
  - Eastern Samar province
- Samar Sea, within the Philippine archipelago

=== Israel ===
- Samar, Israel, kibutz in the Arabah Valley, south Israel

=== Ukraine ===
- Samar, Dnipro, a neighborhood in Dnipro and a former town
- Samar, Ukraine, a city in Dnipropetrovsk Oblast formerly known as Novomoskovsk

== Film and television ==
- Samar (1962 film), an American/Philippine film
- Samar (1999 film), a Hindi/Urdu film
- Samar (2013 film), an Indian Tamil film
- Samar, a fictional criminal portrayed by Aamir Khan in the 2013 Indian film Dhoom 3
- Samar Pratap, a fictional politician portrayed by Ranbir Kapoor in the 2010 Indian film Raajneeti

== Others ==
- SAMAR Air Defence System, an Indian Surface to Missile System
- Samar (yacht), one of longest motor yachts
- Samar cobra (Naja samarensis)
- Samar, an abbreviation for samal rishon, the staff sergeant-equivalent Israeli military rank
- Šamar, 2003 album by the Croatian punk rock band Hladno Pivo

== See also ==
- Battle off Samar, central action of the Battle of Leyte Gulf at Samar Island during World War II
- Sama (disambiguation)
- Samara (disambiguation)
- Samaria (disambiguation)
- Samal (disambiguation)
- Samat (disambiguation)
- SAMR (disambiguation)
