= Samra =

Samra may refer to:

== Given name ==
- Samra Brouk (born 1986), American politician
- Samra Bukhari, Pakistani novelist and dramatist
- Samra Habib, Pakistani-Canadian photographer, writer, and activist
- Samra ibn Jundab (died 680), a companion of Muhammad
- Samra Kesinovic (1997–??), one of two teenage Austrian nationals who went missing in 2014
- Samra Khan, Pakistani singer
- Samra Rahimli (born 1994), Azerbaijani singer and rapper
- Samra Turajlic, British medical oncologist and cancer researcher
- Samra Zafar (born 1982), Pakistani-Canadian human rights advocate, speaker, and writer

== Surname ==
- Amarjit Singh Samra (born 1943), Indian politician and member of Indian National Congress
- Kristos Samra or Christos Samra, Ethiopian female saint who founded a monastery of the Ethiopian Orthodox Tewahedo Church
- Nicholas Samra (born 1944), eparch of the Melkite Catholic Eparchy of Newton in the United States
- Ofer Samra (born 1954), Israeli-born Jewish bodybuilder and actor
- Omar Samra (born 1978), Egyptian adventurer, mountaineer, entrepreneur, inspirational speaker

== Music ==
- Samra (rapper), German rapper
- Samra (album), a 2001 album by Faudel
- Samra (song), a 2023 song by Talia Lahoud

== Places ==
- Al-Samra, a former Palestinian village in the Tiberias subdistrict
- As Samra Mountain or Samra Mountain, a mountain overlooking Ha'il, Saudi Arabia
- Abu Samra, a settlement in Qatar

== See also ==
- Samara (disambiguation)
- Samaria (disambigu)
- Samarra, an ancient city in Iraq
- Samrah, a village in Syria
- Samsara
- Smara
