= Avi-Yonah =

Avi-Yonah may refer to:

- Michael Avi-Yonah (1904–1974), Israeli archaeologist
- Reuven Avi-Yonah, American tax-attorney
