= Khirbet Deir Shams =

Khirbet Deir Shams Arabic: خربة دير شمس
- Khirbet Deir Shams
- Location of Khirbet Deir Shams within Palestine
- Country: Palestine
- Governorate: Hebron Governorate
- Elevation: 580 m (1,900 ft)

Population (1997)
  - Total: 58

Khirbet Deir Shams is one of the villages of Ad-Dhahiriya in the Hebron Governorate, located southwest of the city of Hebron and 18 kilometers south of the West Bank.

== Geography ==
It is located at an altitude of 580 meters above sea level. It is bordered to the east and north by as-Samu' and Ad-Dhahiriya, to the west by the 1949 Armistice Agreements, and to the south by Khirbet Shuweika.

== Population ==
According to the first census of 1997 by the Palestinian Central Bureau of Statistics, the population of Khirbet Deir Shams was (58) people.

== See also ==
- Hebron Governorate
- Ad-Dhahiriya
