= Al-Bireh, Hebron =

Al-Bireh, Hebron Arabic: (البيرة (الخليل
- Al-Bireh, Hebron
- Location of Al-Bireh, Hebron within Palestine
- Coordinates: 31°26′16″N 34°55′40″E
- Country: Palestine
- Governorate: Hebron Governorate
- Elevation: 604 m (1,982 ft)

Population (2007)
  - Total: 289

Al-Bireh is a Palestinian village located southwest of the city of Dura, in the Hebron Governorate of the southern West Bank.

== Geography ==
Al-Bireh is situated at an elevation of 604 meters above sea level. It is bordered to the north by Beit ar-Rush al-Fauqa, to the south and east by Ad-Dhahiriya, and to the south by al-Burj.

== Population ==
According to the Palestinian Central Bureau of Statistics, Al-Bireh had a population of 289 in 2007.

== See also ==
- Dura, Hebron
- Hebron Governorate
