= Somara =

Somara may refer to:

- Somara (moth), or Latoia, a moth genus
- Somara, Hebron, a village in Hebron Governorate, Palestine
- Shini Somara (born 1979), British mechanical engineer and media broadcaster
- Somara Theodore (born 1990), American meteorologist and television personality

== See also ==
- Samara (disambiguation)
