= New Testament places associated with Jesus =

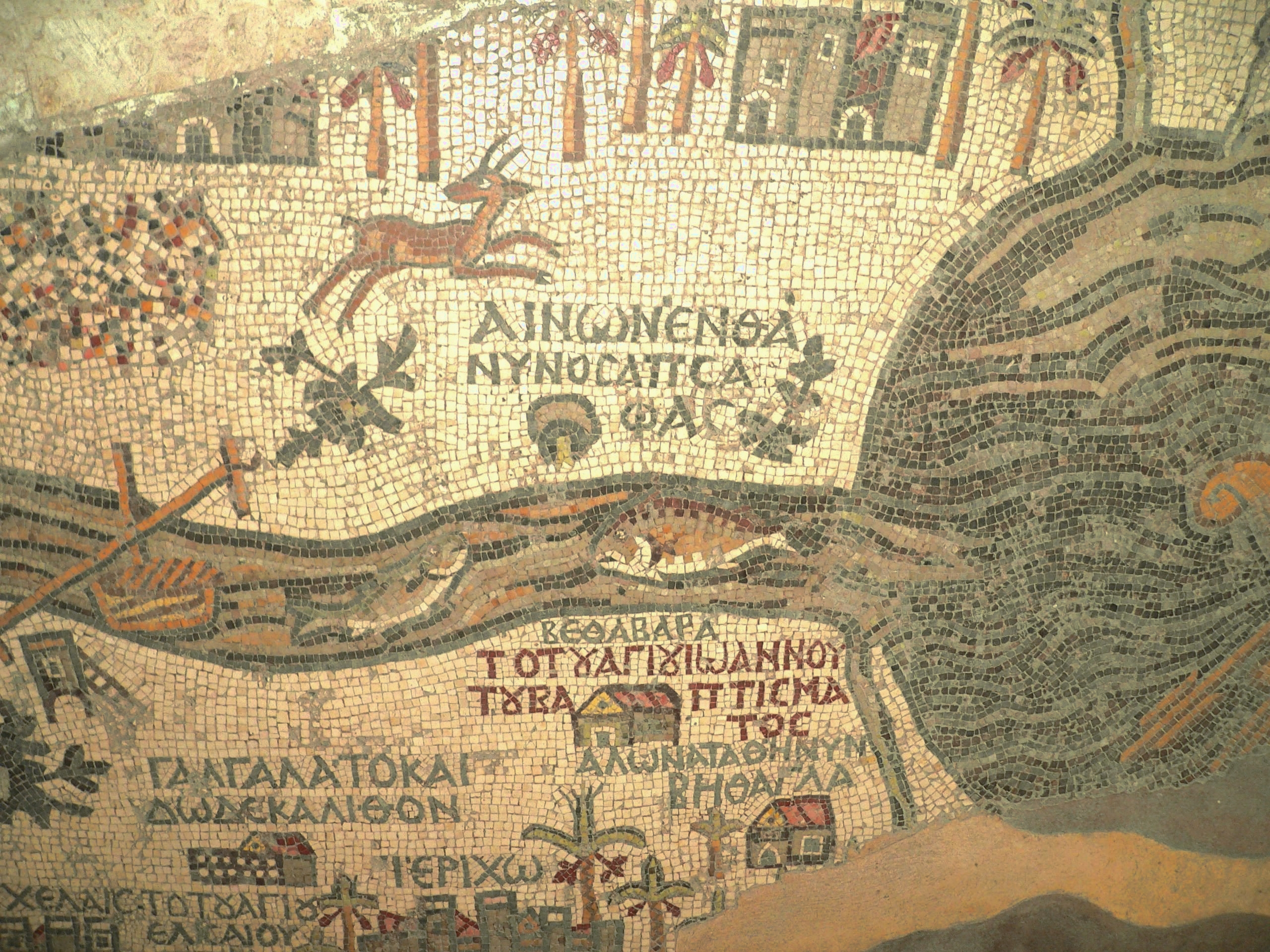
Part of the early Byzantine Madaba Map showing Bethabara (Βέθαβαρά) on the Jordan River

The New Testament narrative of the life of Jesus refers to several locations in the Holy Land and a Flight into Egypt. In these accounts the principal locations for the ministry of Jesus were Galilee and Judea, with activities also taking place in surrounding areas such as Perea and Samaria. Other places of interest to scholars include locations such as Caesarea Maritima where in 1961 the Pilate stone was discovered as the only archaeological item that mentions the Roman prefect Pontius Pilate, by whose order Jesus was crucified.

The narrative of the ministry of Jesus in the Gospels is usually separated into sections that have a geographical nature: his Galilean ministry follows his baptism and continues in Galilee and surrounding areas until the death of John the Baptist. This phase of activities in the Galilee area draws to an end approximately in Matthew 17 and Mark 9. After the death of John the Baptist and Jesus' proclamation as Christ by Peter, his ministry continues along his final journey towards Jerusalem through Perea and Judea. The journey ends with his triumphal entry into Jerusalem in Matthew 21 and Mark 11. The final part of Jesus' ministry then takes place during his last week in Jerusalem which ends in his crucifixion.

== Geography and ministry ==
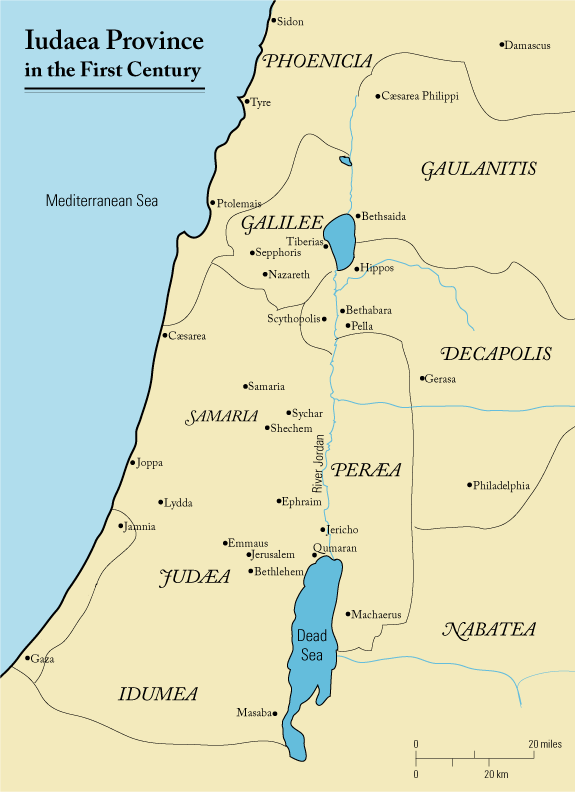
Galilee, Perea and Judea at the time of Jesus

In the New Testament accounts, the principal locations for the ministry of Jesus were Galilee and Judea, with activities also taking place in surrounding areas such as Perea and Samaria. The gospel narrative of the ministry of Jesus is traditionally separated into sections that have a geographical nature.

Galilean ministry
Jesus' ministry begins when after his baptism, he returns to Galilee and preaches in the synagogue of Capernaum. The first disciples of Jesus encounter him near the Sea of Galilee, and his later Galilean ministry includes key episodes such as Sermon on the Mount (with the Beatitudes) which form the core of his moral teachings. Jesus' ministry in the Galilee area draws to an end with the death of John the Baptist.
Journey to Jerusalem
After the death of John the Baptist, about halfway through the Gospels (approximately Matthew 17 and Mark 9) two key events take place that change the nature of the narrative by beginning the gradual revelation of his identity to his disciples: his proclamation as Christ by Peter and his transfiguration. After these events, a good portion of the Gospel narratives deal with Jesus' final journey to Jerusalem through Perea and Judea. As Jesus travels towards Jerusalem through Perea he returns to the area where he was baptized.
Final week in Jerusalem
The final part of Jesus' ministry begins (Matthew 21 and Mark 11) with his triumphal entry into Jerusalem after the raising of Lazarus which takes place in Bethany. The Gospels provide more details about the final portion than the other periods, devoting about one third of their text to the last week of the life of Jesus in Jerusalem which ends in his crucifixion.

Post-Resurrection appearances
The New Testament accounts of the resurrection appearances of Jesus and his ascension place him both in the Judea and the Galilee area.

== Locations ==
=== Galilee ===
Places mentioned in the canonical Gospels in relation to the ministry of Jesus

- Bethsaida: Mark 8:22–26 includes the account of the healing of the "Blind man of Bethsaida".
- Cana: John 2:1–11 includes the marriage at Cana during which Jesus performs his first miracle.
- Capernaum: The pericope of Jesus in the synagogue of Capernaum amounts to the beginning of the public ministry of Jesus in the New Testament narrative. Capernaum is mentioned in the Gospels several times, and events such as healing the paralytic at Capernaum take place there.
- Chorazin: In Matthew 11:23 and Luke 10:13–15 this village in Galilee appears in the context of the rejection of Jesus.
- Gennesaret: This town (which no longer exists) was on the northwestern shore of the Sea of Galilee. The town was perhaps halfway between Capernaum and Magdala. The town is mentioned during Jesus' healing ministry in Gennesaret recorded in Matthew 14:34–36 and Mark 6:53–56.
- Mount of Transfiguration: The location of the mountain for the transfiguration of Jesus is debated among scholars, and locations such as Mount Tabor have been suggested.
- Nain: The pericope of young man from Nain appears in Luke 7:11–17. This is the first of three instances in the Gospels in which Jesus raises the dead.
- Nazareth: Nazareth is where young Jesus grows up. During this time he is found in the Temple in Jerusalem by his parents.
- Sea of Galilee: The lake features prominently throughout the New Testament narrative, from the beginning of his ministry to the end. The calling of his first disciples takes place on the shores of this lake. Towards the end of the narrative, in the second miraculous catch of fish, a resurrected Jesus appears to his apostles again.

=== Decapolis and Perea ===
- Bethabara: The Gospel of John (1:28) states that John the Baptist was baptizing in "Bethany beyond the Jordan". This is not the village Bethany just east of Jerusalem, but the town Bethany, also called Bethabara in Perea. A different interpretation places Bethabara on the opposite, western bank of the Jordan, in Judea rather than Perea; best known among these is the Madaba Map, which places Betahbara at today's west side of Al-Maghtas, officially known as Qasr el-Yahud.
- Decapolis: The healing the deaf mute of Decapolis takes place in this area.
- Gerasa (also Gergesa or Gadara) is the location of the exorcism of the Gerasene demoniac in Mark 5:1–20, Matthew 8:28–34, and Luke 8:26–39.

=== Samaria ===
- Ænon: The Gospel of John (3:23) refers to Enon near Salim as the place where John the Baptist performs baptisms in the River Jordan, "because there was much water there".
- Caesarea Maritima: This port city is the location of the 1961 discovery of the Pilate stone, the only archaeological item that mentions the Roman prefect Pontius Pilate, by whose order Jesus was crucified.
- Sychar: The encounter with the Samaritan woman at the well in John 4:4–26 takes place in Sychar in Samaria near Jacob's Well. This is the location of the Water of Life Discourse in John 4:10–26.

=== Judea ===
- Bethany (near Jerusalem): The raising of Lazarus, shortly before Jesus enters Jerusalem for the last time, takes place in Bethany.
- Bethesda: In John 5:1–18, the healing of the paralytic takes place at the Pool of Bethesda in Jerusalem.
- Bethlehem: The Gospel of Luke (2:1-7) states that the birth of Jesus took place in Bethlehem.
- Bethphage is mentioned as the place from which Jesus sent the disciples to find a donkey for the triumphal entry into Jerusalem. Matthew 21:1; Mark 11:1; Luke 19:29 mention it as close to Bethany. Eusebius of Caesarea (Onomasticon 58:13) located it on the Mount of Olives.
- Calvary (Golgotha): Calvary is the Latin term for Golgotha the Greek translation of the Aramaic term for the place of the skull—the location of the crucifixion of Jesus.
- Emmaus: Jesus appears to two disciples on the road to Emmaus (Luke 24:13–32) and eats supper with them.
- Gabbatha (Lithostrōtos): This location is referenced only once in the New Testament in John 19:13. This is an Aramaic term that refers to the location of the trial of Jesus by Pontius Pilate, and the Greek name of Lithostrōtos (λιθόστρωτος) meaning stone pavement also refers to it. It was likely a raised stone platform where Jesus faced Pilate. James Charlesworth considers this location of high archaeological significance and states that modern scholars believe this location was in the public square just outside the Praetorium in Jerusalem and was paved with large stones.
- Gethsemane: Immediately after the Last Supper, Jesus and his disciples go to the garden at Gethsemane, the location of his agony in the garden and his arrest.
- Jericho: The healing the blind Bartimaeus occurs near Jericho.
- Mount of Olives: This mountain appears in several New Testament passages, and the Olivet Discourse is named after it. During his triumphal entry into Jerusalem, Jesus descends from the Mount of Olives towards Jerusalem, and the crowds lay their clothes on the ground to welcome him. In Acts 1:9-12, the ascension of Jesus takes place near this mountain.
- Temple in Jerusalem: The Temple is featured in the cleansing of the Temple incident, where Jesus expels the money changers.

=== Other places ===
- Egypt: The Flight to Egypt episode in the Gospel of Matthew takes place after the birth of Jesus, and the family flees to Egypt before returning to Galilee a few years later.
- "The region of Tyre and Sidon" (Mark 7:24–30 and Matthew 15:21–28) in what had once been Phoenicia and had become in Jesus' time part of Roman Syria, today situated in Southern Lebanon. There Jesus exorcises a demon from the daughter of a Syrophoenician woman.
- Caesarea Phillippi ("the villages around Caesarea Philippi"): the capital city of the tetrarchy of Philip is mentioned in Mark 8:27 and its surroundings are the first location where Jesus predicts his death (Mark 8:31). This area is also important in the New Testament because, just before entering it, Jesus asks his disciples "who do you think that I am?", producing the "You are the Christ of God" response from Apostle Peter in Matthew 16:13-20, Mark 8:27-29 and Luke 9:18-20.
- Road to Damascus: In the Acts of the Apostles (9, 22 and 26), this road is the location for the conversion of the Apostle Paul, during which the resurrected Jesus appears to him.

== Archaeology ==
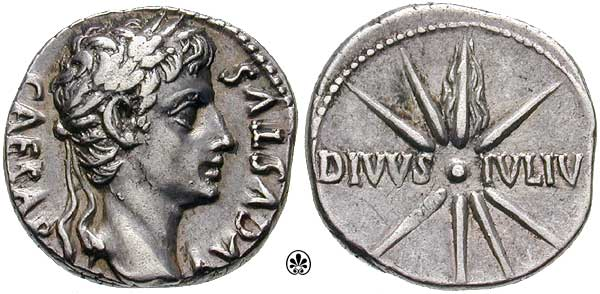
An Augustus denarius, stating CAESAR AVGVSTVS; and on the reverse: DIVVSIVLIV(S), which the population at large took to mean Son of God

No documents written by Jesus exist, and no specific archaeological remnants are directly attributed to him. The 21st century has witnessed an increase in scholarly interest in the integrated use of archaeology as an additional research component in arriving at a better understanding of the historical Jesus by illuminating the socio-economic and political background of his age.

James Charlesworth states that few modern scholars now want to overlook the archaeological discoveries that clarify the nature of life in Galilee and Judea during the time of Jesus. Jonathan Reed states that chief contribution of archaeology to the study of the historical Jesus is the reconstruction of his social world. An example archaeological item that Reed mentions is the 1961 discovery of the Pilate stone, which mentions the Roman prefect Pontius Pilate, by whose order Jesus was crucified.

Reed also states that archaeological finding related to coinage can shed light on historical critical analysis. As an example, he refers to coins with the ""Divi filius" inscription. Although Roman Emperor Augustus called himself "Divi filius", and not "Dei filius" (Son of God), the line between being god and god-like was at times less than clear to the population at large, and the Roman court seems to have been aware of the necessity of keeping the ambiguity. Later, Tiberius who was emperor at the time of Jesus came to be accepted as the son of divus Augustus. Reed discusses this coinage in the context of Mark 12:13–17 in which Jesus asks his disciples to look at a coin: "Whose portrait is this? And whose inscription?" and then advises them to "Render unto Caesar the things which are Caesar's, and unto God the things that are God's." Reed states that "the answer becomes much more subversive when one knows that Roman coinage proclaimed Caesar to be God".

David Gowler states that an interdisciplinary scholarly study of archeology, textual analysis and historical context can shed light on Jesus and his teachings. An example is the archeological studies at Capernaum. Despite the frequent references to Capernaum in the New Testament, little is said about it there. However, recent archeological evidence show that unlike earlier assumptions, Capernaum was poor and small, without even a forum or agora. This archaeological discovery thus resonates well with the scholarly view that Jesus advocated reciprocal sharing among the destitute in that area of Galilee. Other archeological findings support the wealth of the ruling priests in Judea at the beginning of the first century.

== See also ==
- Chronology of Jesus
- Detailed Christian timeline
- Gospel harmony
- Historical Jesus
- Jesus in Christianity
- Life of Christ in art
- Life of Jesus in the New Testament
- Macmillan Bible Atlas
- Timeline of the Bible
- List of Hebrew place names
