= Qasr al-Yahud =

Baptism site in the Jordan River Valley, West Bank

- قصر اليهود (Arabic)
- Al-Maghtas
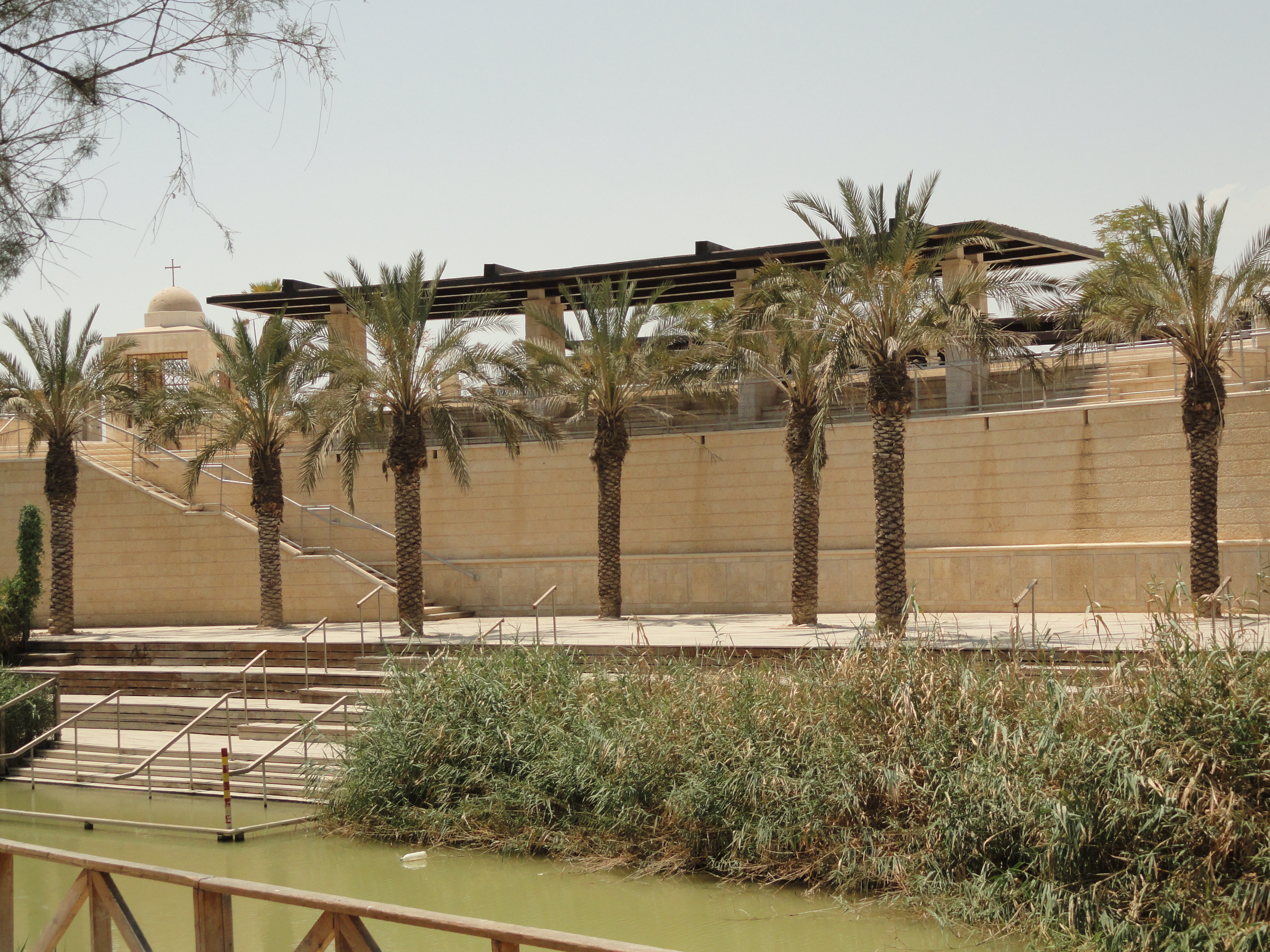

- Location within the West Bank
- 31.838333°N 35.539167°E
- Location: Jericho Governorate, West Bank, Palestine
- Palestine grid: 201/138

Site notes
- Public access: Yes (see website)
- Website: (Baptismal Site on the Jordan River - Qasr al-Yahud)

Qasr al-Yahud (Arabic: قصر اليهود, lit. "The citadel of the Jews", Hebrew: קאסר אל יהוד), also known as Al-Maghtas, is the western section of the traditional site of the baptism of Jesus by John the Baptist on the Jordan River (Matthew 3:13–17). It has also been traditionally identified with two episodes from the Hebrew Bible, as one of the possible points through which the Israelites have crossed the Jordan river as they reached the Promised Land (Joshua 3), and as the site where prophet Elijah ascended to heaven (2 Kings 2:1–14). "Qasr al-Yahud" is actually an Arabic name given to the nearby Monastery of St John the Baptist, but is also being used for the West Bank section of the baptism site itself. The site is part of UNESCO's tentative list of World Heritage Sites in Palestine since 2015.

The spot is located in Area C of the West Bank and it sits directly across the eastern section (on Wikipedia as "Al-Maghtas"; known officially in Jordan as "Baptism Site "Bethany Beyond the Jordan"") and close to the Palestinian city of Jericho. Since the Six-Day War in 1967, the baptism site has been under Israeli occupation, and the site and facilities are currently administered by the Israeli Civil Administration and the Israeli Ministry of Tourism as part of a national park, where baptism ceremonies can be performed.

== Etymology ==
The Jordanian side uses the names Al-Maghtas, Bethany beyond the Jordan and Baptism(al) Site, while the western part is known as Qasr al-Yahud. The nearby Greek Orthodox Monastery of St John the Baptist has a castle-like appearance (thus qasr, "castle"), and tradition holds that the Israelites crossed the river at this spot (thus al-Yahud, "of the Jews"). The monastery is known in Arabic both as Deir Mr Yuhanna, lit. "Monastery of Saint John", and Qasr el-Yahud.

=== Spelling ===
It is variously spelled as Kasser or Qasser, al- or el-, Yahud or Yehud etc.

== Location ==
Qasr al-Yahud is located in the West Bank, a little southeast from Jericho, and is part of the Jericho Governorate Since the Six-Day War in 1967, it has been under Israeli occupation, and the site and facilities are currently administered by the Israeli Civil Administration and the Israeli Ministry of Tourism as part of a national park.

== Significance ==
As part of the traditional site of the baptism of Jesus, it has been a pilgrimage site since late antiquity.

The 6th-century Madaba Map places Bethabara ("house of the ford", "place of crossing"), a name used by some versions of the New Testament, on the west bank of the Jordan. However, the contemporary archaeology from the same period shows that the site of the baptism was believed to have been on what is now the Jordanian side of the river, at the Al-Maghtas site (see Al-Maghtas#Bethabara).

== History ==
=== Antiquity ===
Qasr al-Yahud is close to the ancient road and river ford connecting Jerusalem, via Jericho, to several Transjordanian biblical sites such as Madaba, Mount Nebo and the King's Highway.

According to Procopius (writing c. 560 CE), Emperor Justinian I had a cistern constructed here. In 1883 it was described as "still visible, in almost perfect condition".

=== Crusader period ===
According to Theoderic (c. 1172), the Templars had built a castle next to the Greek monastery of St John and the Baptism site, of which no trace has been found. The Templars, together with the Hospitallers, had the mission of protecting the pilgrims who came to the Holy Land in the time of the Crusader Kingdom of Jerusalem, and this castle was part of a chain of Templar fortifications along the pilgrimage route down to the Jordan, which also included the castle of Maldoim halfway between Jerusalem and the river, and the fortified top of Mount Quarantana above Jericho.

=== 19th and 20th century ===
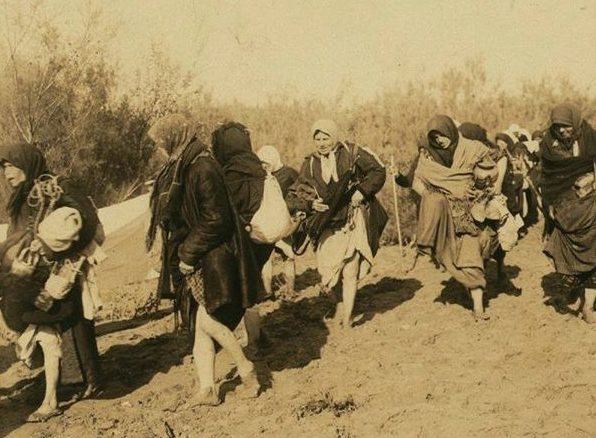
Russian Orthodox women visiting "Al-Maghtas" (1913)

The west side of the traditional baptism site became again a target for mass pilgrimage toward the end of the 19th and beginning of the 20th century. Later in the 20th century, a large number of churches and monasteries were built between the old Greek Orthodox Monastery of St John the Baptist and the river, an area that became known as the "Land of the Monasteries". It comprised Catholic (Franciscan), Greek, Ethiopian Orthodox, Syriac, Russian, Romanian, and Coptic churches.

=== After 1967 ===
The site was closed in 1967 during the Six-Day War. The restoration project was approved before the 2000 millennium celebrations but was delayed due to the Second Intifada and flooding in the region in 2003. In 2000, Pope John Paul II held a private worship at the site.

=== After 2011 ===
The modern site reopened in 2011. Qasr al-Yahud is administered by the Israeli Civil Administration and the Israeli Ministry of Tourism. In 2019, the area near the site was demined by the HALO Trust.

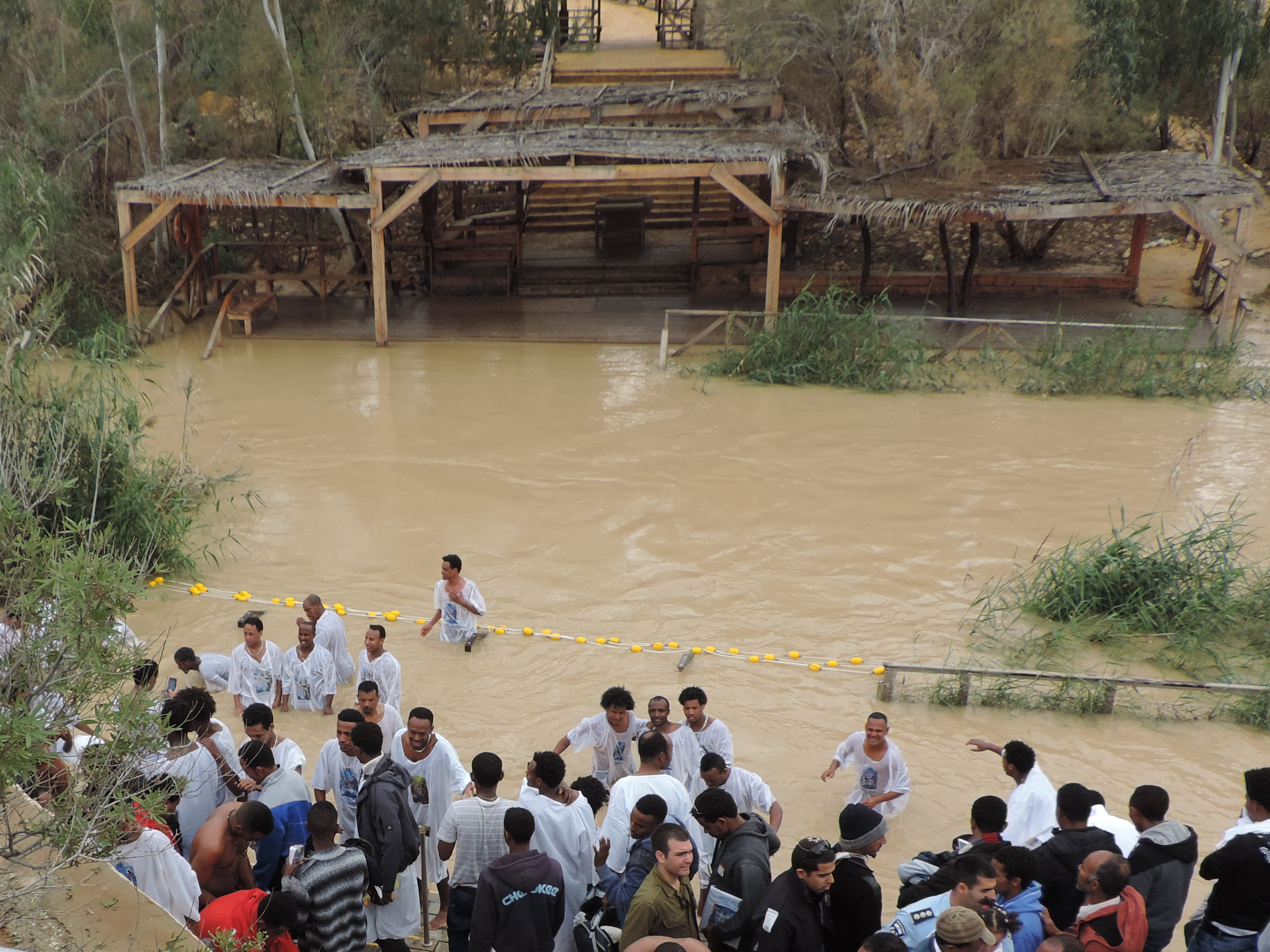
Baptism at Qasr al-Yahud

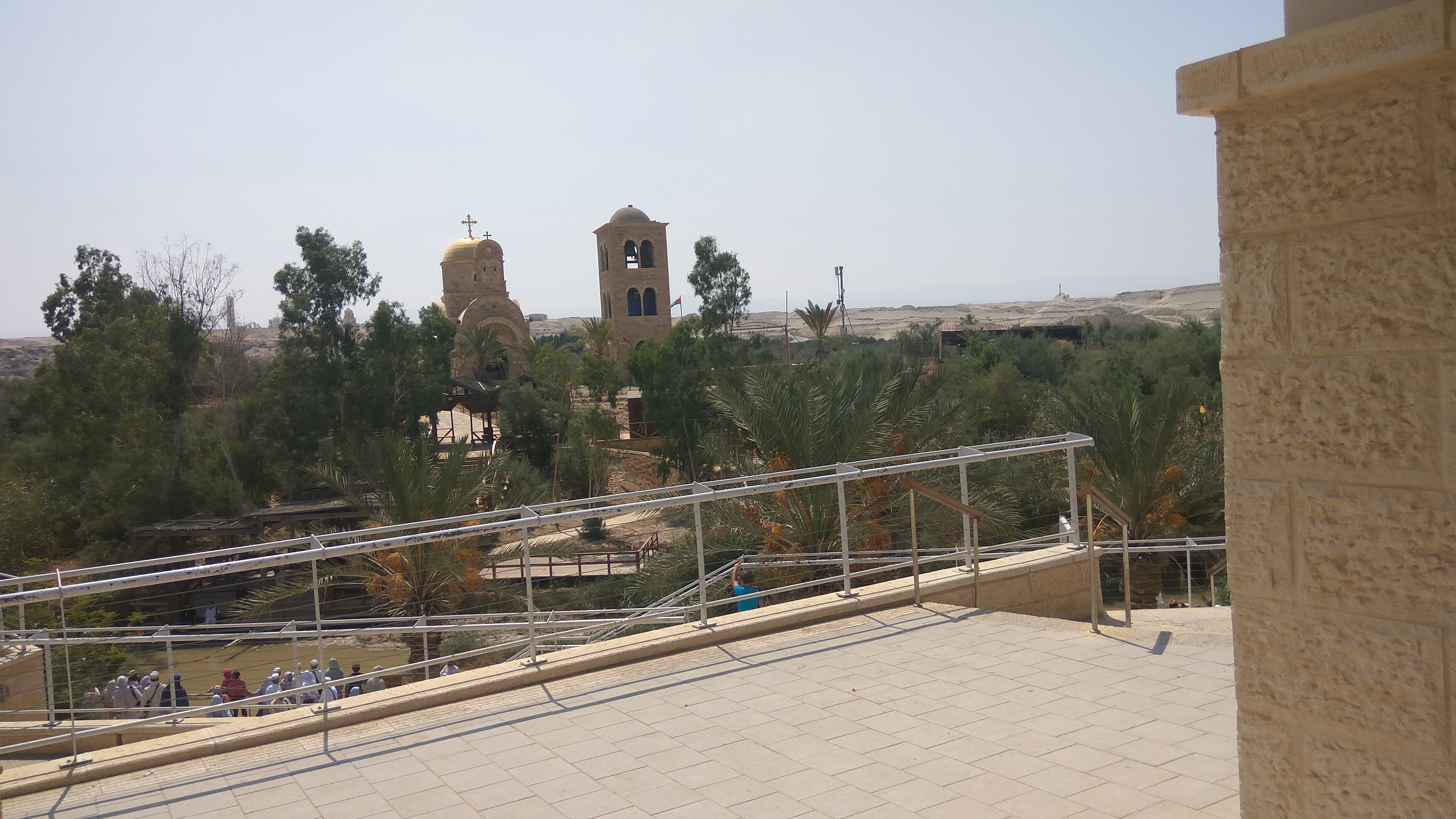
Facilities at Qasr al-Yahud and Greek Orthodox church in Jordan, across the border

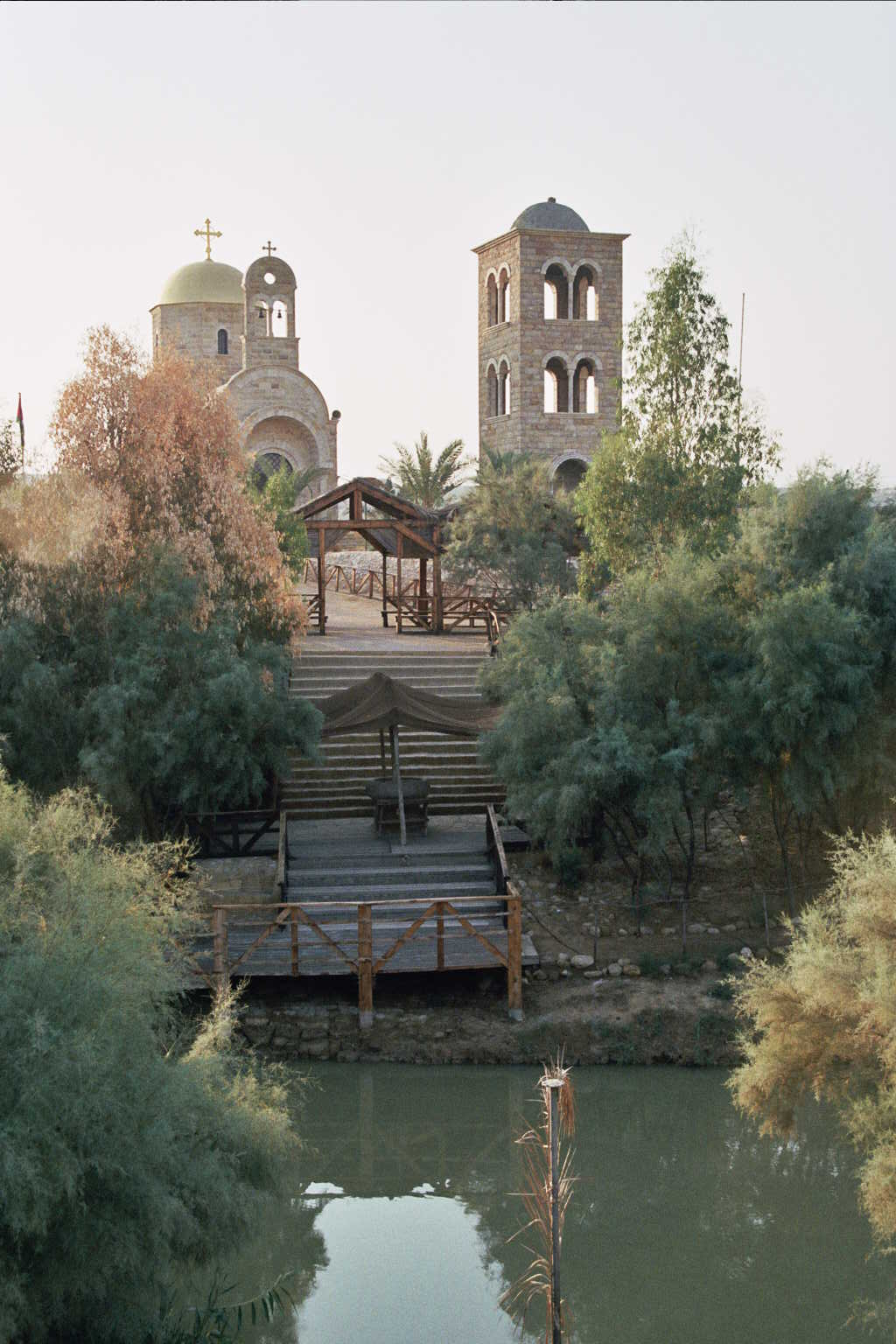
Greek Orthodox church on the Jordanian side

== See also ==
- Aenon
- Bethabara / Bethany Beyond the Jordan / Al-Maghtas
- Mandaeism
- Masbuta
- New Testament places associated with Jesus

== Bibliography ==
- Conder, C.R.; Kitchener, H.H. (1883). The Survey of Western Palestine: Memoirs of the Topography, Orography, Hydrography, and Archaeology. Vol. 3. London: Committee of the Palestine Exploration Fund. (inscriptions and several graphitæ at, 181, 218; general description, 217)
- Guérin, V. (1874). Description Géographique Historique et Archéologique de la Palestine (in French). Vol. 2: Samarie, pt. 1. Paris: L'Imprimerie Nationale. (in 1870: pp. 111-116)
- Marti, Karl; Schick, C (1880). "Mitteilungen von Bauart C. Schick in Jerusalem über die alten Lauren und Klöster in der Wüste Juda". Zeitschrift des Deutschen Palästina-Vereins. 3: 1–43. (Marti and Schick, 1880, p. 15)
- Noort, Ed (2004). "Βεθαβαρα Τò Του̑ Άγίου 'Ιωάννου Του̑ Βαπτίσματος Remarks About Storied Places at the Jordan, John the Baptist and the Madaba Mosaic Map". In García Martínez, Florentino; Luttikhuizen, Gerard P. (eds.). Jerusalem, Alexandria, Rome: Studies in Ancient Cultural Interaction in Honour of A. Hilhorst. Supplements to the Journal for the Study of Judaism. Brill. pp. 221–241. ISBN 9789047402794.
- Palmer, E.H. (1881). The Survey of Western Palestine: Arabic and English Name Lists Collected During the Survey by Lieutenants Conder and Kitchener, R. E. Transliterated and Explained by E.H. Palmer. Committee of the Palestine Exploration Fund.
- Procopius (1888). Of the buildings of Justinian. Palestine Pilgrims' Text Society.
- Robinson, E.; Smith, E. (1841). Biblical Researches in Palestine, Mount Sinai and Arabia Petraea: A Journal of Travels in the year 1838. Boston: Crocker & Brewster.
  - Volume 2, p. 257
  - Volume 3, 2nd appendix, p. 122
