= Turajlić =

Turajlić (Serbian Cyrillic: Tураљић) is a family name found in Serbia and Bosnia.

Notable people with the surname include:

- Hakija Turajlić (1936–1993), Bosniak politician, economist and businessman, Deputy Prime Minister of Bosnia and Herzegovina
- Mila Turajlić (born 1979), Serbian documentary film maker, daughter of Srbijanka Turajlić
- Samra Turajlic, medical oncologist and cancer researcher in London
- Srbijanka Turajlić (1946–2022), Serbian academic and pro-democracy political activist, also mother of the film maker Mila Turajlić
