= Naitar =

- Village
- Location in Assam, India Naitar (India)
- Coordinates: 26.17°N 91.59°E
- Country: India
- State: Assam
- District: Kamrup

Government
  - Body: Gram panchayat

Languages
  - Official: Assamese
- Time zone: UTC+5:30 (IST)
- PIN: 781127
- Vehicle registration: AS
- Website: kamrup.nic.in

Naitar is a village in Kamrup, situated in north bank of river Brahmaputra.

== Transport ==
Naitar is accessible through National Highway 31. All major private commercial vehicles ply between Naitar and nearby towns.

== See also ==
- Nahira
- Pachim Samaria
