= Samara (surname) =

Samara is a surname. Notable people with the surname include:

- Fred Samara (born 1950), American athlete
- Rami Samara (born 1983), Jordanian footballer
- Rana Samara (born 1985), Palestinian painter
- Stavroula Samara (born 1994), Greek rhythmic gymnast

== See also ==
- Samara (given name)
- Samaras
