= Samara (given name) =

- Gender: Female

Origin
- Meaning: Various

Other names
- Related names: Samaria, Samarie, Sammara and Semara

Samara is a female given name of various origins. It might refer to Samara, Russia; Samarra, Iraq; or to winged fruit seeds. The name increased in use after it was used for an evil character in the 2002 horror film The Ring.

== People ==
- Samara Almeida (born 1992), Brazilian volleyball player
- Samara Colina (1992 – 2026), Mexican artist
- Samara Downs, British ballerina
- Samara Felippo (born 1978), Brazilian actress
- Samara Firebaugh, American electrical engineer and academic administrator
- Samara Golden (born 1973), American artist
- Samara Halperin, American artist
- Samara Heavrin, American politician
- Samara Joy, American jazz singer
- Samara Klar, American political scientist
- Samara Lubelski, American musician
- Samara Routerberg (1977-2017), American murder victim
- Samara Sibin (born 2002), Brazilian rhythmic gymnast
- Samara Venceslau Carneiro (born 2006), Brazilian footballer
- Samara Weaving (born 1992), Australian actress and model

== Fictional characters ==
- Samara Morgan, antagonist of the 2002 horror film The Ring
- Samara (Mass Effect), a character in the Mass Effect video games

== See also ==
- Samra
- Samaras
