= Macmillan Bible Atlas =

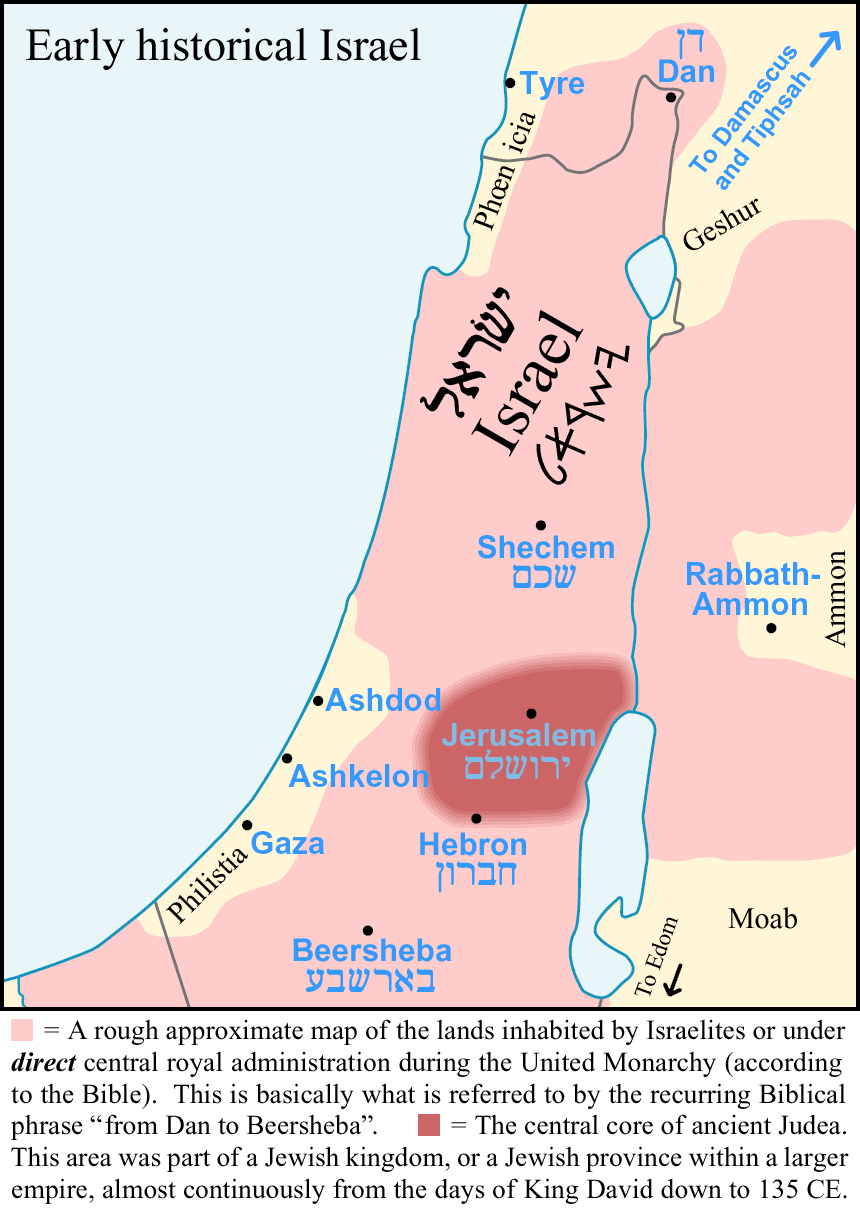
Map image partially influenced by the Macmillan Bible Atlas

The Macmillan Bible Atlas is a book on the geography, civilizations and cartography of the Holy Land. It describes the movements of biblical characters, trade routes and battles. It also refers to archaeological excavations; illustrations of artifacts; and a comparative chronology of early civilizations that relate to the Bible.

When it was first published in 1968, the Library Journal called it "one of the year's most outstanding reference books". The third edition was published in 1993, after which a fourth (2002) and fifth (2011) edition appeared under a new title, Carta Bible Atlas.

The Macmillan Bible Atlas was created primarily by Michael Avi-Yonah and Yohanan Aharoni.

== See also ==
- New Testament places associated with Jesus
