= Samal =

Samal may refer to:

== Cultures ==
- The Sama languages of the Sulu Archipelago
- The ethnic groups that speak this language (including the Banguingui), see Sama-Bajau peoples

== People ==
- Jayiram Samal, an Indian comic actor
- Sámal Joensen-Mikines, a Faroese painter
- Sámal Johansen, a Faroese editor
- Sámal Pætursson Lamhauge, Prime Minister of the Faroe Islands from 1706 to 1752
- Samal Saeed, an Iraqi footballer

== Places ==
=== Iran ===
- Samal, Iran, a village in Bushehr Province, Iran
- Samal-e Jonubi, a village in Bushehr Province, Iran
- Samal-e Shomali, a village in Bushehr Province, Iran

=== Philippines ===
- Samal, Davao del Norte, an island city in Davao del Norte
- Samal, Bataan, a municipality in Bataan

=== Turkey ===
- Sam'al, an ancient Hittite city, now the Zincirli archaeological site in southern Turkey

== Other ==
- Samal, the rank of sergeant in the Israel Defense Forces
