= Samaria (disambiguation) =

Samaria is a historical province in the region of Israel/Palestine.

Samaria may also refer to:

== Places ==
=== Levant - historical ===
- Kingdom of Israel (Samaria), the post-Judaite split northern kingdom
- Samaria (ancient city), capital of the post-Judaite split northern Kingdom of Israel, roughly 930–720 BC
- Samaria District, one of the six administrative districts of Mandatory Palestine during British rule

=== Israel / West Bank - present ===
- Judea and Samaria Area, Israeli administrative divisions in the West Bank

=== United States ===
- Samaria, Idaho, an unincorporated community in the United States
- Samaria, Indiana, a small town in the United States
- Samaria, Michigan, an unincorporated community in the United States

=== Other places ===
- Samaria Gorge on the island of Crete
- Mount Samaria State Park, Victoria , Australia

== People ==
- Agnes Samaria, Namibian runner
- Bobby Samaria (born 1970), Namibian football manager and former player
- Samaria (Mitcham) Bailey, woman in the American civil rights movement
- Samaria Gómez, Salvadoran footballer (born 2002)

== Transport ==
- RMS Samaria (1920), a Cunard ocean liner
- Samaria, British Rail Class 40 diesel locomotive D228, built by English Electric

== Film ==
- Samaritan Girl (Korean: Samaria), a 2004 South Korean film
- Intrigo: Samaria, a 2019 German-Swedish-American mystery film

== Other uses ==
- The Samaria series of books by Sharon Shinn
- Samaria, other name for samarium(III) oxide, the sesquioxide of the chemical element samarium
- Samaria (bryozoan), an extinct genus of bryozoans in the order Fenestrida
- Samaria (reptile), an extinct genus of reptiles provisionally included in the family Procolophonidae
- Samaria (moth), a genus of moths in the family Pyralidae

== See also ==
- Pachim Samaria, a village in Assam, India
- Samara (disambiguation)
- Samar (disambiguation)
