= Healing the paralytic at Bethesda =

Miracle carried out by Jesus according to the Bible

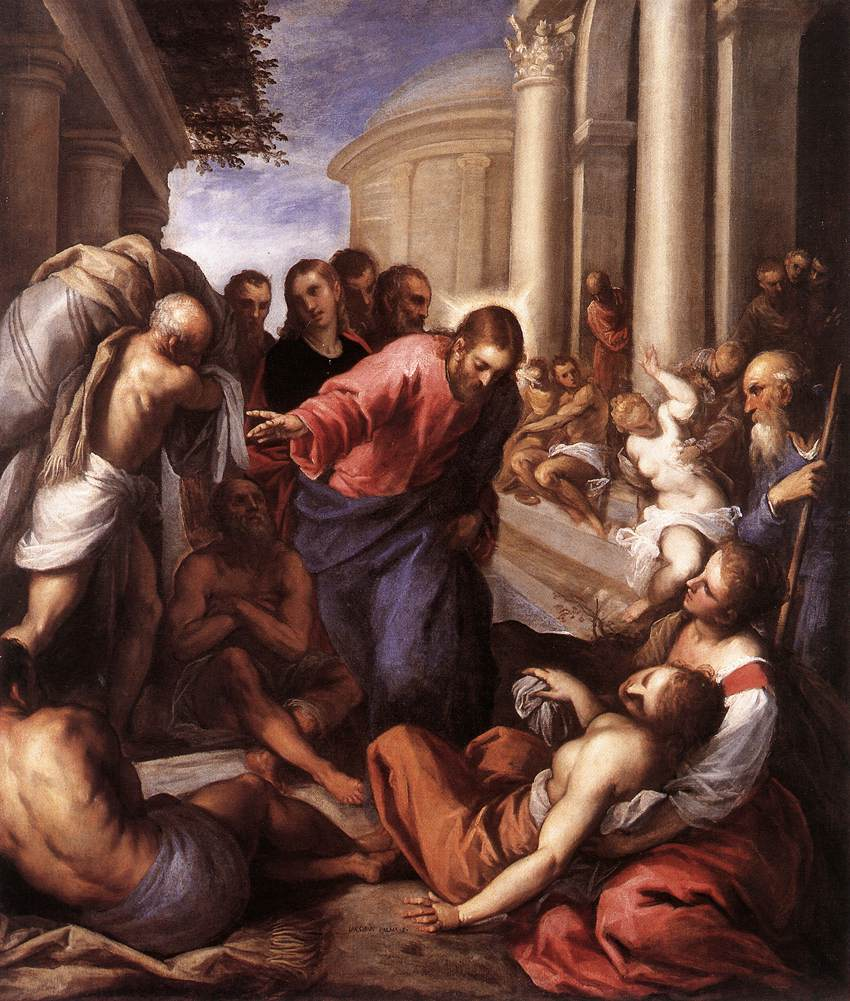
The Pool, by Palma il Giovane, 1592

The Healing of a paralytic at Bethesda is one of the miraculous healings attributed to Jesus in the New Testament.

This event is recounted only in the Gospel of John, which says that it took place near the "Sheep Gate" in Jerusalem (now the Lions' Gate), close to a fountain or a pool called "Bethzatha" in the Novum Testamentum Graece version of the New Testament. The Revised Standard Version and New Revised Standard Version use the name "Bethzatha", but other versions (the King James Version, Geneva Bible, Revised English Bible, New Jerusalem Bible and New American Bible) have "Bethesda". The place is called "Probatica, or in Hebrew Bethsaida", in the Douai-Rheims translation.

== Narrative ==
John's Gospel account describes how Jesus, visiting Jerusalem for a Jewish feast (John 5:1), encounters one of the disabled people who used to lie here, a man who had been paralysed for thirty-eight years. Jesus asks the man if he wants to get well. The man explains that he is unable to enter the water, because he has no one to help him in and others go down ahead of him. Jesus tells him to pick up his bed or mat and walk; the man is instantly cured and is able to do so.

The Gospel then explains that this healing took place on the Sabbath, and the local Jews told the cured man that the Law forbade him to carry his mat on this day. He tells them that he had been told to do so by the man who had healed him. They ask him who this healer was but he is unable to tell them because Jesus had slipped away into the crowd.

Later, Jesus finds the man in the Temple, and tells him not to sin again, so that nothing worse happens to him. The man goes away and tells the Jewish people that it was Jesus who had made him well (John 5:15). The Gospel account explains that the Jews began to persecute Jesus because he was healing on the Sabbath. He responds by saying that "My Father is still working, and I also am working" (John 5:17). This assertion makes the Jews all the more determined to kill him, because not only is he breaking the Sabbath but he is making himself equal to God by calling God his father (John 5:1–18).

== Textual interpolations ==
Several manuscripts of the Gospel include a passage considered by many textual critics to be an interpolation added to the original text, explaining that the disabled people are waiting for the "troubling of the waters"; some further add that "an angel went down at a certain time into the pool and stirred up the water; then whoever stepped in first, after the stirring of the water, was made well of whatever disease he had" (John 5:4). Although the main edition of the Latin Vulgate does not include the "troubling of the water" or the "angel", these were present in some of the Latin manuscripts, and in many of those used for the Greek Textus Receptus, on which early English translations of the Bible were based. Modern textual scholarship views these extra details as unreliable and unlikely to have been part of the original text; many modern translations do not include them, but retain the verse numbering system, so that they skip from verse 3a straight to verse 5. (The inclusion of verse 3b as part of the interpolation does create a difficulty, in that the troubling of the waters is also mentioned in John 5:7.)

== Relation to pagan healing ==
Some scholars have suggested that the narrative is actually cast as part of a deliberate polemic the Asclepius cult, an antagonism possibly partly brought on by the fact that Asclepius was worshipped as Saviour (Greek: Soter), in reference to his healing attributes. The narrative uses the Greek phrase ὑγιὴς γενέσθαι, hygies genesthai, ("become healthy" or "be made whole"), which is not used anywhere in the Synoptic Gospels, but appears frequently in ancient testimonies to the healing powers of Asclepius. The later narrative in the Gospel of John about Jesus washing Simon Peter's feet at the Last Supper, similarly uses the Greek term λούειν, louein, which is the word typically used of washing in an Asclepeion, rather than the more ordinary Greek word νίπτειν, niptein, used elsewhere in the Johannine text to describe washing. The interpolations may reflect attempts to mediate between pagan and Jewish or Christian interpretations of how healing at the pool might have been brought about.

== Comparison with Acts 3 ==
In Acts 3:1–10 a similar healing event is recorded, in which the Apostles Peter and John visit the Temple and heal a disabled person in Jesus's name. The setting is comparable, in each case a specific location in Jerusalem is named, and in each case the fact that the healed person walked away is highlighted.

== See also ==
- Life of Jesus in the New Testament
- New Testament places associated with Jesus
