= Nampara Majarkuri =

- Village
- Location in Assam, India Nampara Majarkuri (India)
- Coordinates: 26.32°N 91.80°E
- Country: India
- State: Assam
- District: Kamrup

Government
  - Body: Gram panchayat

Languages
  - Official: Assamese
- Time zone: UTC+5:30 (IST)
- PIN: 781102
- Vehicle registration: AS
- Website: kamrup.nic.in

Nampara Majarkuri is a village in Kamrup, situated in north bank of river Brahmaputra.

== Transport ==
Nampara Majarkuri is accessible through National Highway 31. All major private commercial vehicles ply between Nampara Majarkuri and nearby towns.

== See also ==
- Nahira
- Pachim Samaria
