= Samat =

Samat may refer to:

- Mount Samat, a mountain in the Philippines
- Samat, Kyrgyzstan, a village in Batken Region, Kyrgyzstan
- Samat, Mudurnu, Turkey
- Sammat, a community of Sindhi people, name given to the Samma tribes.

== See also ==
Other similarly spelled names:

- Samal (disambiguation)
- Samar
