= Arab al-Fureijat =

Village in Hebron Governorate, Palestine

Arab al-Fureijat Arabic: عرب الفريجات
- Arab al-Fureijat
- Location of Arab al-Fureijat within Palestine
- Country: Palestine
- Governorate: Hebron Governorate

Population (2007)
  - Total: 572

Arab al-Fureijat is a Palestinian village in the Hebron Governorate, located southwest of the city of Hebron and near al-Ramadin in the southern West Bank.

== Population ==
The population of Arab al-Freijat in 2007 was approximately 572, according to the Palestinian Central Bureau of Statistics.

== See also ==
- Hebron Governorate
- al-Ramadin
