= Nahira =

- Village
- Location in Assam, India Nahira (India)
- Coordinates: 26.19°N 91.71°E
- Country: India
- State: Assam
- District: Kamrup

Government
  - Body: Gram panchayat

Languages
  - Official: Assamese
- Time zone: UTC+5:30 (IST)
- PIN: 781132
- Vehicle registration: AS
- Website: kamrup.nic.in

Nahira is a village in Kamrup, situated in north bank of river Brahmaputra.

== Transport ==
Nahira is accessible through National Highway 31. All major private commercial vehicles ply between Nahira and nearby towns.

== See also ==
- Naitar
- Nampara Majarkuri
