= Al-Ramadin =

Village in West Bank, Palestine

al-Ramadin
- Municipality type D (Village council)

Arabic transcription(s)
  - Arabic: الرماضين
  - Latin: Arab al-Ramadin (official)
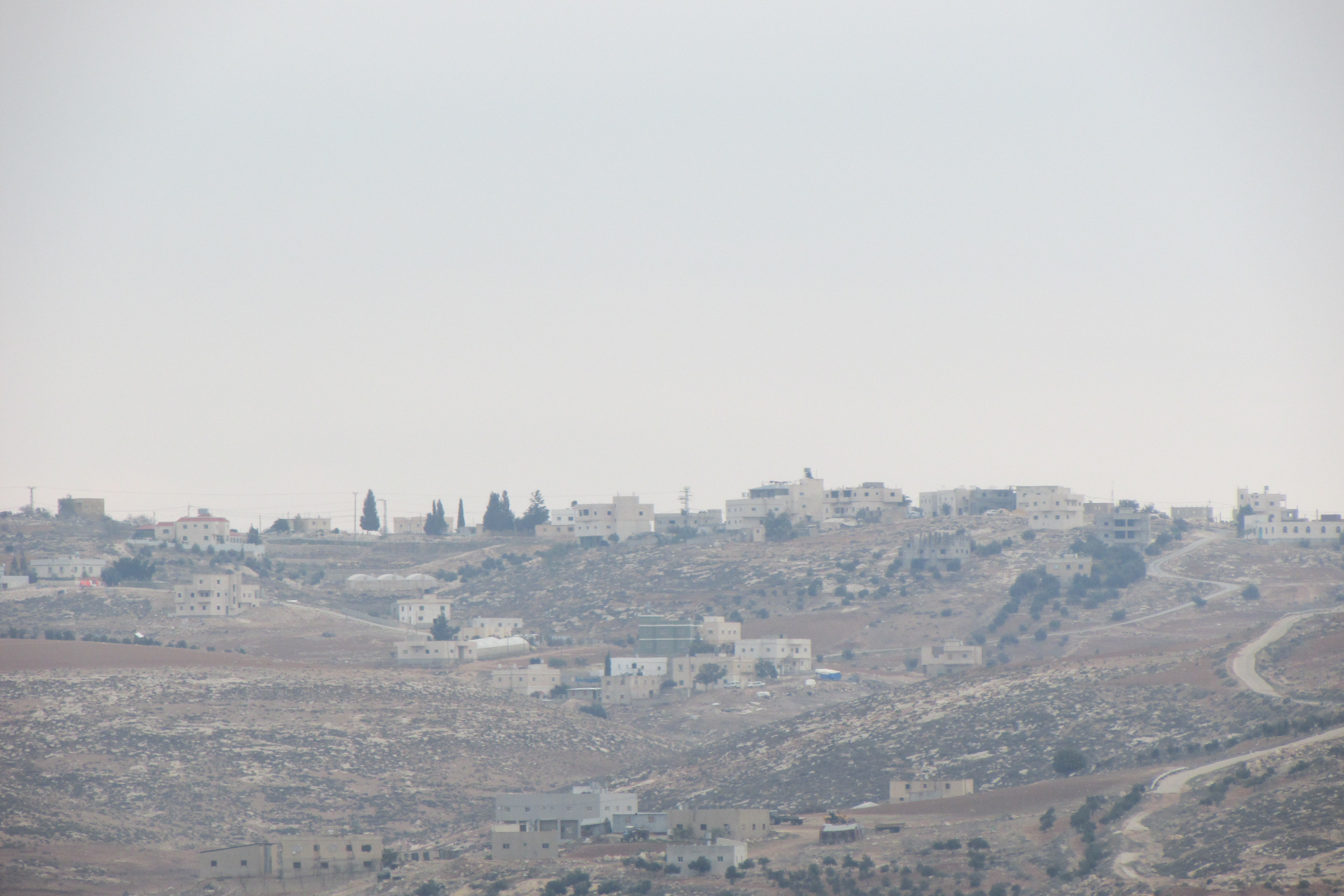
- al-Ramadin

- Location of al-Ramadin within Palestine
- Coordinates: 31°22′43″N 34°54′55″E
- State: State of Palestine
- Governorate: Hebron
- Founded: 1948

Government
  - Type: Village council (from 1997)
  - Head of Municipality: Abdulkarim al-Sho'ur

Area
  - Total: 7.8 km^{2} (3.0 sq mi)

Population (2017)
  - Total: 4,150
  - Density: 530/km^{2} (1,400/sq mi)

Al-Ramadin (Arabic: الرماضين) is a Palestinian village located 24 kilometers southwest of Hebron and includes the smaller village of 'Arab al-Fureijat to the southeast. The village is part the Hebron Governorate in the southern West Bank. According to the Palestinian Central Bureau of Statistics, the two villages had a combined population of 4,150 in 2017. The principal families are al-Sho'ur, al-Zagharna, al-Fureijat, al-Daraghmeh, al-Raghmat, al-Mlihat and al-Masamra.

Al-Ramadin and 'Arab al-Fureijat were established by Bedouins who fled their traditional homeland in the vicinity of Beersheba in the Negev for the suburbs of ad-Dhahiriya. The name "al-Ramadin" derives from "Ramadan," the patriarch of the main Bedouin tribe that founded the modern village after the 1948 Arab-Israeli War. A nine-member village council was appointed by the Palestinian Authority to administer al-Ramadin and Arab al-Fureijat in 1997.

There are three active mosques in al-Ramadin, as well as three historic Christian edifices, including the al-Fadi Monastery and al-Asela Church. The primary health care facilities for the village are designated by the Ministry of Health as level 2.
