= Madaba Map =

6th-century mosaic map of the Holy Land

Coordinates: 31°43′3.54″N 35°47′39.12″E

Annotated reproduction of the Madaba Map

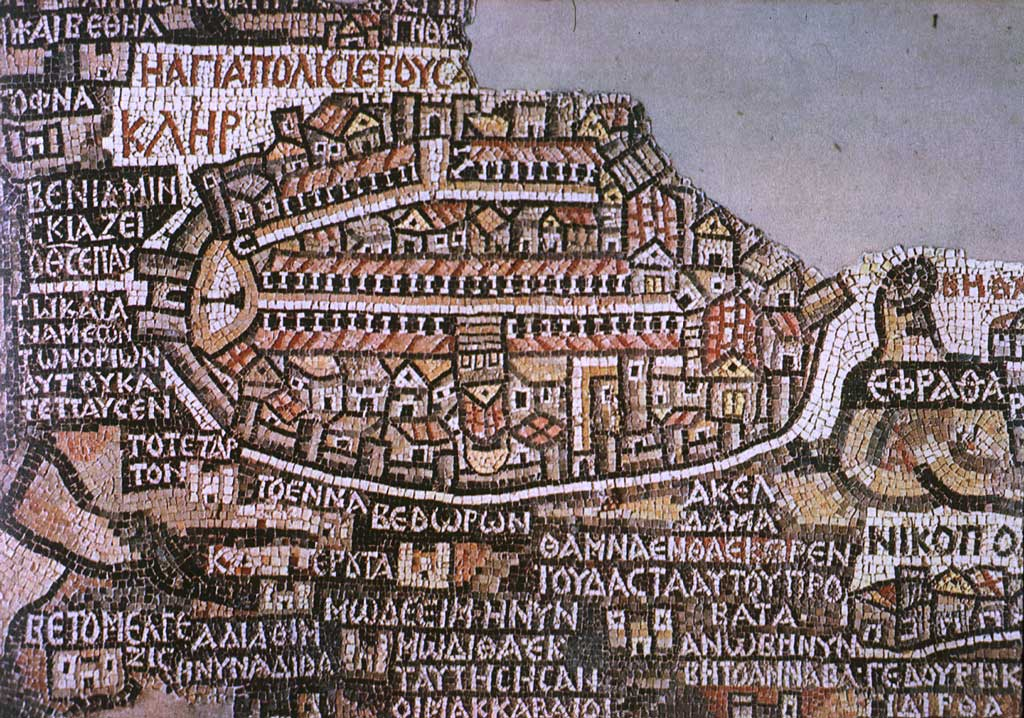
Jerusalem on the Madaba Map

The Madaba Map, also known as the Madaba Mosaic Map, is part of a floor mosaic in the early Byzantine church of Saint George in Madaba, Jordan.

The mosaic map depicts an area from Lebanon in the north to the Nile Delta in the south, and from the Mediterranean Sea in the west to the Eastern Desert.

It contains the oldest surviving original cartographic depiction of the Holy Land and especially Jerusalem. The map dates to the sixth century AD.

== History ==
The Madaba Mosaic Map depicts Jerusalem with the New Church of the Theotokos, which was dedicated on 20 November 542. Buildings erected in Jerusalem after 570 are absent from the depiction, thus limiting the date range of its creation to the period between 542 and 570. The mosaic was made by unknown artists, probably for the Christian community of Madaba, which was the seat of a bishop at that time.

In 614, Madaba was conquered by the Sasanian Empire. In the eighth century, the ruling Muslim Umayyad Caliphate had some figural motifs removed from the mosaic. In 746, Madaba was largely destroyed by an earthquake and subsequently abandoned.

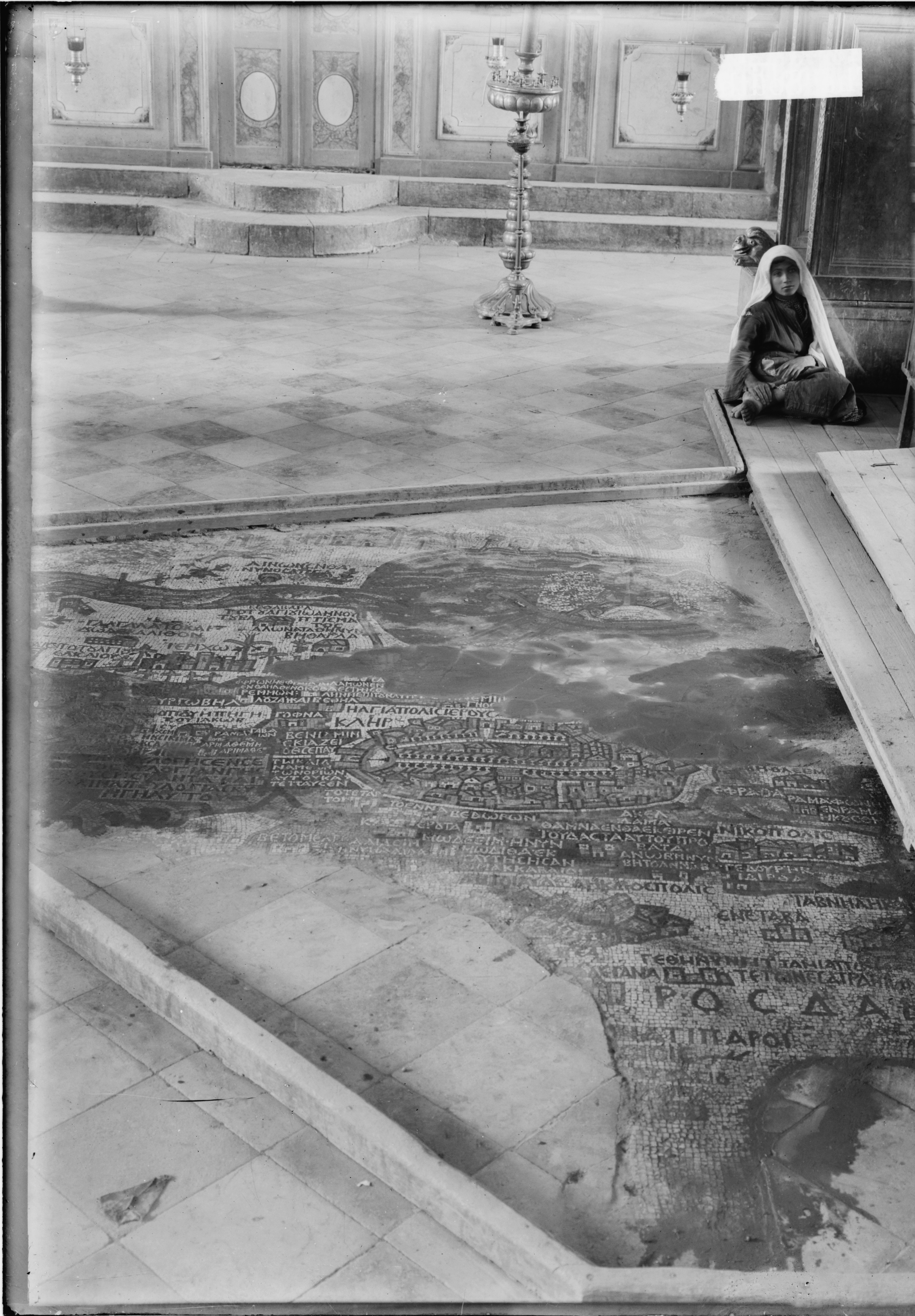
The newly rediscovered mosaic inside the modern Orthodox church (cropped from original stereogram)

According to reports submitted to the Jerusalem Patriarchate in 1886 and 1886, remnants of the inscribed mosaic were discovered during preparation work for the construction of a new Greek Orthodox church on the site in 1884 and 1886. Patriarch Nicodemus I of Jerusalem was informed, the church building erected and roofed over (summer 1895-August 1896), but the full mosaic was only noticed during clearing work for a new cement-slab floor in October 1896, and no research was carried out until December of that year, after the floor had already been laid around the mosaic by local workers under the supervision of a Greek architect.

In the following decades, large portions of the mosaic map were damaged by fires, activities in the new church, and by the effects of moisture. In December 1964, the Volkswagen Foundation gave the Deutscher Verein zur Erforschung Palästinas (lit. "German Association for the Exploration of Palestine") 90,000 DM to save the mosaic. In 1965, the archaeologists Heinz Cüppers and Heinrich Brandt undertook the restoration and conservation of the remaining parts of the mosaic.

== Description ==
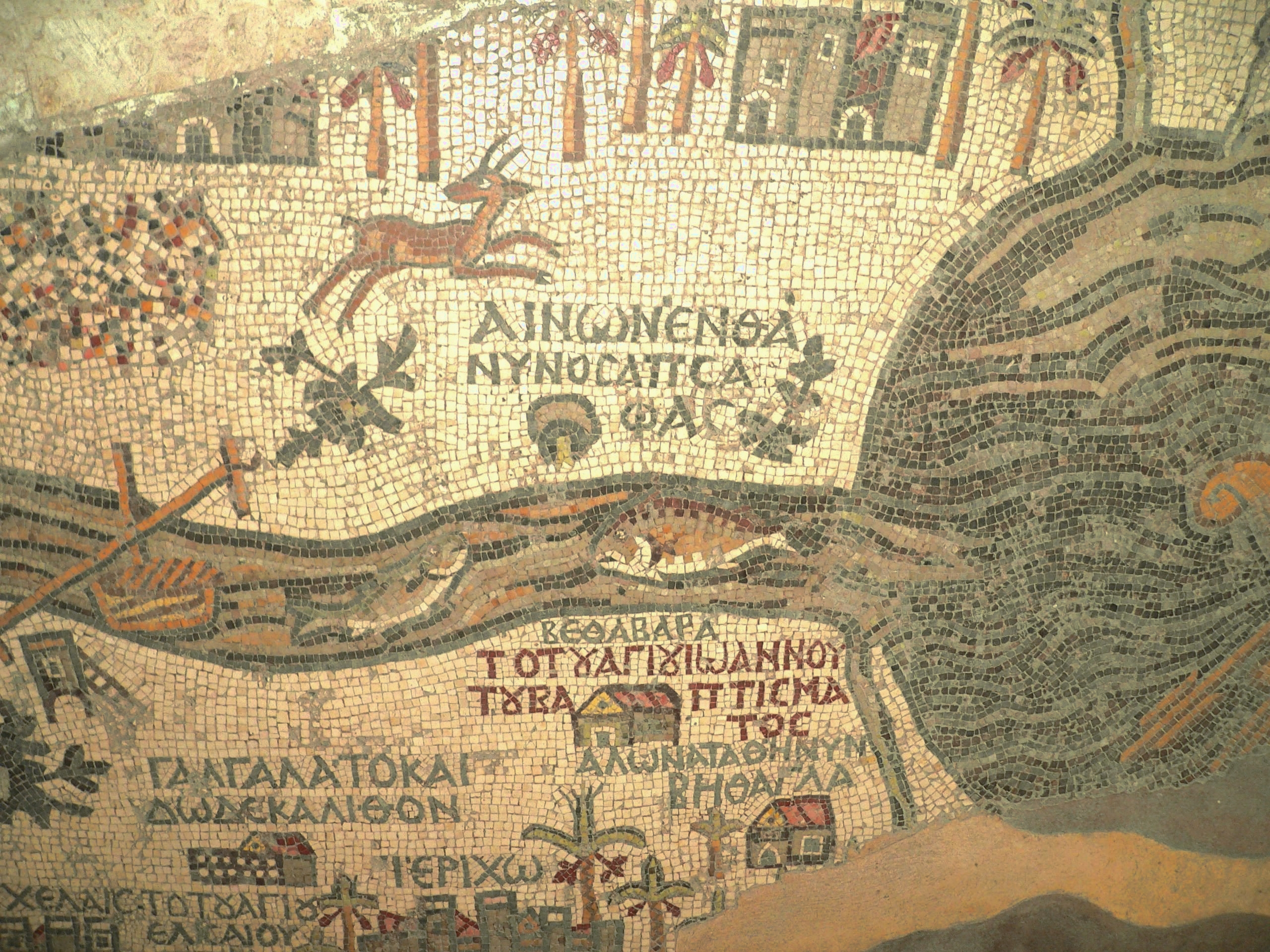
Place of John the Baptist's baptism at the mouth of the Jordan and a (nearly-obliterated) lion hunting a gazelle

The floor mosaic is located in the apse of the church of Saint George at Madaba. It is not oriented northward, as modern maps are, but faces east toward the altar in such a fashion that the position of places on the map coincides with the compass directions. Originally, it measured 21 by 7 m and contained more than two million tesserae. Its current dimensions are 16 by 5 m.

=== Topographic representation ===
The mosaic map depicts an area from Lebanon in the north to the Nile Delta in the south, and from the Mediterranean Sea in the west to the Eastern Desert. Among other features, it depicts the Dead Sea with two fishing boats, a variety of bridges linking the banks of the Jordan, fish swimming in the river and receding from the Dead Sea; a lion (rendered nearly unrecognisable by the insertion of random tesserae during a period of iconoclasm) hunting a gazelle in the Moab desert, palm-ringed Jericho, Bethlehem, and other biblical-Christian sites. The map may partially have served to facilitate pilgrims' orientation in the Holy Land. All landscape units are labelled with explanations in Greek. The mosaic's references to the tribes of Israel, toponymy, as well as its use of quotations of biblical passages, indicate that the artist who laid out the mosaic used the Onomasticon of Eusebius (fourth-century AD) as a primary source. A combination of folding perspective and an aerial view depicts approximately 150 towns and villages, all labelled.

The largest and most detailed element of the topographic depiction is Jerusalem (Greek: ΙΕΡΟΥΣΑ[ΛΉΜ]), at the centre of the map. The mosaic clearly shows a number of significant structures in the Old City of Jerusalem: the Damascus Gate, the Lions' Gate, the Golden Gate, the Zion Gate, the Church of the Holy Sepulchre, the New Church of the Theotokos, the Tower of David, and the Cardo Maximus. On Jerusalem's southwest side is shown Acel Dama (lit. "field of blood"), from Christian liturgy. The recognisable depiction of the urban topography makes the mosaic a key source on Byzantine Jerusalem. Also unique are the detailed depictions of cities such as Neapolis, Askalon, Gaza, Pelusium, and Charachmoba, all of them nearly detailed enough to be described as street maps. Other designated sites include:

- Aenon (Greek: ΑΙΝΩΝΕΝΘΑ ΝΥΝΟϹΑΠϹΑ ΦΑϹ) (Lit. "Ainon, where now is Sapsaphas");
- Archelais (Greek: ΑΡΧΕΛΑΙϹ);
- Azotos Paralos (Ashdod-Coast) (Greek: ΑΖΩΤΟϹΠΑΡΑΛ[ΙΟϹ]);
- Beit-ḥagla (Greek: ΒΗΘΑΓΛΑ);
- Beth Annaba (Greek: ΒΕΤΟΑΝΝΑΒΑ);
- Beth Zachar[ias] (Greek: ΒΕΘΖΑΧΑΡ[ΊΟΥ]);
- Bethlehem (Greek: ΒΗΘΛΕΕΜ);
- Bethoron (Greek: ΒΕΘΩΡΩΝ);
- Coreae (Greek: ΚΟΡΕΟΥΣ);
- Gibeon (Greek: ΓΑΒΑΩΝ);
- The Great Plain (Greek: [ΚΛΗ]ΡΟϹ ΔΑΝ), literally meaning, "Lot of Dan";
- Jamnia (Greek: ΊΑΒΝΗΛΗΚΑΙΊΑΜΝΙΑ) (Lit. "Jabneel, which is also Jamnia");
- Jericho (Greek: ΪΕΡΙΧⲰ);
- Lydda (Greek: ΛΩΔΗ);
- Maresha (Greek: ΜΟΡΑΣΘΙ);
- Modi'im (Greek: ΜΩΔΕΕΙΜ);
- Nicopolis (Greek: ΝΙΚΟΠΟΛΙϹ);
- Rama (Greek: ΡΑΜΑ);
- Saphitha (Greek: CΑΦΙΘΑ);
- Socho (Greek: ϹΩΧΩ), modern Khirbet Shuweika;
- Tharais (Greek: ΘΑΡΑΙϹ), in 2025 archaeologists published their findings on the discovery of Tharais in the journal Gephyra, following research and excavations carried out from 2021 to 2024.

One site represented on the map that is no longer extant are the stones at Gilgall, which are clearly represented on the Madaba Map and may be hidden underneath one of the churches in Qas'r Al-Yahud. Many of these sites are marked on the mosaic map with various artistic vignettes representing the site in the Province of Palestina Tertia. For example, Jericho and Zoar (Greek: ΖΟΟΡΑ) are both represented by vignettes of date palm orchards. Zoar is seen on the far south-eastern side of the Dead Sea.

== Scholarly significance ==
The mosaic map of Madaba is the oldest known geographic floor mosaic in art history. It is used heavily for the localisation and verification of biblical sites. Study of the map played a major role in answering the question of the topographical location of Ascalon (Asqalan on the map).

In 1967, excavations in the Jewish Quarter of Jerusalem revealed the Nea Church and the Cardo Maximus in the very locations suggested by the Madaba Map.

In February 2010, excavations further substantiated its accuracy with the discovery of a road depicted in the map that runs through the center of Jerusalem. According to the map, the main entrance to the city was through a large gate opening into a wide central street. Until the discovery, archaeologists were not able to excavate this site due to heavy pedestrian traffic. In the wake of infrastructure work near the Jaffa Gate, large paving stones were discovered at a depth of four meters below ground that prove such a road existed.

== Complete photograph of the surviving map ==
In early 2025, with the church under extensive renovation and all furniture and flooring removed, a photograph of the entire extant map was made by Lucinda Curzon and Shaker Khanfar. This is the only photograph of the entire map, shot from above. It was made for Thomas Suárez's Palestine Mapped (Interlink, 2025).

== Copies of the map ==
- The Archaeological Institute of Göttingen University contains a copy of the map in its archive collections. This copy was produced during the conservation work at Madaba in 1965 by archaeologists of the Rheinisches Landesmuseum, Trier.
- A copy produced by students of the Madaba Mosaic School is in the foyer of the Akademisches Kunstmuseum at Bonn.
- The entrance lobby of the YMCA in Jerusalem has a small replica of the Jerusalem part of the map incorporated in its floor. At the Byzantine Cardo in the Old City there's another copy of the Jerusalem section, with explanations.

== See also ==
- Early Byzantine mosaics in the Middle East
- Umm ar-Rasas mosaics
- Eusebius of Caesarea
- Itinerarium Burdigalense
- Egeria
- Jerome
- Anonymous pilgrim of Piacenza
- Chronicon Paschale
- John of Würzburg

== Bibliography ==
=== Early sources ===
- Abel, F.-M. (1924). "Le Sud Palestinien d'apres la carte mosaique de Madaba". Journal of the Palestine Oriental Society (in French). IV: 107-117.
- Lagrange, M.-J. (July 1897). "JÉRUSALEM D'APRÈS LA MOSAÏQUE DE MADABA". Revue Biblique. 6 (3). Peeters Publishers: 450–458. JSTOR 44101959.
- Palmer, P.; Dr. Guthe (1906), Die Mosaikkarte von Madeba, Im Auftrage des Deutschen Vereins zur Erforschung Palätinas

=== Later sources ===
- Leal, Beatrice (Fall 2018), "A Reconsideration of the Madaba Map", Gesta, 57 (2): 123–143, doi:10.1086/698839, S2CID 194929753.
- Madden, Andrew M., "A New Form of Evidence to Date the Madaba Map Mosaic," Liber Annuus 62 (2012), 495-513.
- Hepper, Nigel; Taylor, Joan, "Date Palms and Opobalsam in the Madaba Mosaic Map," Palestine Exploration Quarterly, 136,1 (April 2004), 35-44.
- Herbert Donner: The Mosaic Map of Madaba. Kok Pharos Publishing House, Kampen 1992, ISBN 90-390-0011-5
- Herbert Donner; Heinz Cüppers (1977). Die Mosaikkarte von Madeba: Tafelband; Abhandlungen des Deutschen Palästinavereins 5. Otto Harrassowitz Verlag. ISBN 978-3-447-01866-1.
- Avi-Yonah, M.: The Madaba mosaic map. Israel Exploration Society, Jerusalem 1954
- Michele Piccirillo: Chiese e mosaici di Madaba. Studium Biblicum Franciscanum, Collectio maior 34, Jerusalem 1989 (Arabische Edition: Madaba. Kana'is wa fusayfasa', Jerusalem 1993)
- Kenneth Nebenzahl: Maps of the Holy Land, images of Terra Sancta through two millennia. Abbeville Press, New York 1986, ISBN 0-89659-658-3
- Adolf Jacoby: Das geographische Mosaik von Madaba, Die älteste Karte des Heiligen Landes. Dieterich'sche Verlagsbuchhandlung, Leipzig 1905
- Weitzmann, Kurt, ed., Age of spirituality: late antique and early Christian art, third to seventh century, no. 523, 1979, Metropolitan Museum of Art, New York, ISBN 9780870991790
