= Reuven Avi-Yonah =

Tax attorney, academic, and author

- ראובן אבי-יונה
- Occupations: Tax attorney, academic, and author

Academic background
- Education: Hebrew University, B.A., History; Harvard University, M.A., PhD, History; Harvard Law School, JD

Academic work
- Institutions: University of Michigan Law School

Reuven Avi-Yonah (Hebrew: ראובן אבי-יונה) is a tax attorney, academic, and author. He is the Irwin I. Cohn Professor of Law and the director of the International Tax LLM Program at the University of Michigan.

Avi-Yonah is amongst the most prominent and oft-cited scholars in public finance. He is most known for his research on corporate and international taxation, and is the author of several books including Advanced Introduction to International Tax, Global Perspectives on Income Taxation Law, and International Tax as International Law.

== Education ==
Avi-Yonah is the son of the archaeologist and historian Michael Avi-Yonah. Avi-Yonah graduated summa cum laude from Hebrew University with a bachelor's degree in history in 1983. He then moved to the United States, earning his Master's and Doctoral degrees in history from Harvard University in 1984 and 1986, respectively. He obtained a Juris Doctor (J.D.) with high honors from Harvard Law School in 1989.

== Career ==
Avi-Yonah began his academic career as an assistant professor of history at Boston College in 1986. After serving in this position for 3 years, he joined Harvard as a visiting scholar for International Tax Program and was subsequently promoted to assistant professor of law at Harvard Law School in 1994. Followed by that, he held appointment as professor of law at the University of Michigan Law School for a year, and has been serving there as Irwin I. Cohn Professor of Law since 2001. Moreover, he held appointment as a director of International Tax LLM at the University of Michigan from 2002 to 2019.

Avi-Yonah worked as an associate for numerous law firms, including Ropes & Gray (Boston), Wachtell, Lipton, Rosen & Katz (New York City), and Milbank, Tweed, Hadley & McCloy (New York). He has served as a consultant to the U.S. Department of the Treasury and the Organisation for Economic Co-operation and Development (OECD) on tax competition. He was appointed as a trustee of the American Tax Policy Institute in 2010, and Chair of Tax Section, AALS in 2012. In addition to that, he has chaired several committees of ABA Tax Section. Since 2015, he has been working as a Coordinator for Fiscal Pillar, Law, Justice and Development Project at the World Bank.

== Works ==
Avi-Yonah's research is primarily focused on tax law. He has published over 300 articles on topics related to corporate and international taxation. His book, International Tax as International Law, explores how the tax rules of various countries in the world interact with one another to form an international tax regime. In 2011, he published another book, entitled Global Perspectives on Income Taxation Law. The book is reviewed by Rav Singh as a work "which largely succeeds in illuminating the basic concepts of tax law from a comparative law perspective."

While considering the complexity of migrant integration processes, Avi-Yonah highlighted the impacts and opportunities created as a result of changing international tax regimes, with attention to the role of tax treaties and recent court cases. His 2016 book is focused on the migration of individuals, as well as corporate headquarters, while exploring particularly the issues associated with optimal tax models that allow for mobility of workers. In the same year, he authored a book that was based on the tax jurisprudence of the judicial systems of the European Union (EU) and the United States (US). He provided a judicial review incorporating how taxation in the world's two most economically significant multistate systems has exposed a remarkable divergence, and what can the two tribunals learn from each other about adjudicating issues that arise from the interaction of tax regimes in the context of a single market. Moreover, Avi-Yonah has contributed his works to discuss policy issues that impact the design of the U.S. international tax laws both in the inbound and outbound context.

Avi-Yonah evaluated the increased usage of tax incentives as weapons in international competition to attract investment. With an intention to ensure that all income may be taxed in the investor's home jurisdiction, he proposed the coordinated imposition of withholding taxes on international portfolio investment. He also demonstrated how the 'structure of the international tax regime' reflects a consensus about the allocation of taxable income among taxing jurisdictions. In his paper published in 2009, he provided possible reasons for how and why a carbon tax is a better response to global warming than cap and trade. In his historical perspective on corporate social responsibility, he discussed the basic cyclic transformations of the corporate form, as well as derived the normative consequences for the legitimacy of corporate social responsibility (CSR).

The two pillars of the OECD/G20 Base Erosion and Profit Shifting (BEPS) effort from 2013 onward to reform international taxation are both in part based on Avi-Yonah's work. Pillar 1 proposes to tax a portion of the profits of large multinationals in the jurisdiction where they have sales as originally suggested by Avi-Yonah in 1993 and modified by Avi-Yonah, Clausing and Durst in 2009. Pillar 2 is an implementation of the single tax principle which was first developed by Avi-Yonah in 1997. The IMF has called Avi-Yonah's work on Pillar 1 "path breaking". The contribution of Avi-Yonah to Pillar 2 has been acknowledged by tax academics such as Ruth Mason who wrote "Because states already faithfully adhered to the no-double-tax norm, growing acceptance of full taxation as a goal of international tax brings states closer to implementing Avi-Yonah's 'single-tax principle'" and Wolfgang Schoen of the Max Planck Institute for Tax Law and Intellectual Property who wrote "What can one say about the 'single tax principle'? Has it gained the status of a guiding and binding principle of international tax law? Here, it is evident that the BEPS Action Plan adopted Avi-Yonah's findings to a large extent. International taxation – it claims – should ensure that income from cross-border transactions is taxed exactly once – not more, not less."

== Distinctions ==
Avi-Yonah is a Fulbright scholar and Fellow of American Bar Foundation, and American College of Tax Counsel, and an international research fellow at Oxford University's Centre for Business Taxation. He is the Co-Editor of Revista Tributaria das Americas, and Journal of Accounting, Economics and Law. At Harvard Law School, he was awarded the Felix Frankfurter Scholarship.

== Bibliography ==
=== Books ===
- U.S. International Taxation: Cases and Materials (2007)
- International Tax as International Law: An Analysis of the International Tax Regime (2007) ISBN 978-1139465830
- The Integrated 2006 United States Model Income Tax Treaty (2008) ISBN 978-1600420528
- US International Taxation, Chinese edition (2009)
- U.S. International Taxation: Cases and Materials, Second Edition (2011) ISBN 978-1599413761
- Global Perspectives on Income Taxation Law (2011) ISBN 978-0195321357
- Taxation and Migration (2015) ISBN 978-9041161444
- International Tax Law (2016) ISBN 978-178100 3657
- Comparative Fiscal Federalism, 2nd ed. (2016) ISBN 978-9041159748
- Advanced Introduction to International Tax Law Advanced Introduction to International Tax Law, Second Edition (2019) ISBN 978-1788978507
- U.S. International Taxation: Cases and Materials, 5th Edition (2022) ISBN 978-1647082291

=== Selected articles ===
- Avi-Yonah, R. S. (1995). Structure of International Taxation: A Proposal for Simplification. Texas Law Review 74, no. 6 (1996): 1301–1359.
- Avi-Yonah, R. S. (1997). International taxation of electronic commerce. Tax Law Review 52, no. 3 (1997): 507–555.
- Avi-Yonah, R.S. (2000). Globalization, tax competition, and the fiscal crisis of the welfare state. Harv. L. Rev. 113, no. 7 (2000): 1573–676.
- Avi-Yonah, R.S. (2005). The cyclical transformations of the corporate form: A historical perspective on corporate social responsibility. Del. J. Corp. L. 30, no. 3 (2005): 767–818.
- Avi-Yonah, R.S., & Uhlmann, D.M. (2009). Combating global climate change: Why a carbon tax is a better response to global warming than cap and trade. Stan. Envtl. L.J. 28, no. 1 (2009): 3–50.
