= SAMR =

SAMR or Samr may refer to:

- State Administration for Market Regulation, the Chinese government's department for market controls
- Squad Advanced Marksman Rifle
- Substitution, Augmentation, Modification, Redefinition, a pedagogical model of technology integration
- South Australian Mounted Rifles, a historic military unit
- San Rafael Airport (Argentina), ICAO airport code SAMR
- Samaritan script (ISO 15924 code)
