= Michael Avi-Yonah =

Israeli archaeologist and historian (1904–1974)

Michael Avi-Yonah; born Julius Jonah Jehiel Buchstab (Hebrew: מיכאל אבי-יונה; September 26, 1904 – March 26, 1974) was an Israeli archaeologist and art historian. During his career he was a professor of archaeology at the Hebrew University of Jerusalem and served as secretary of Israel's Department of Antiquities. He published over 400 academic works, including books, journal articles, chapters and encyclopedia entries. He is credited with laying the foundations for the study of Classical and Byzantine archaeology in the Land of Israel/Palestine. Avi-Yonah designed the Holyland Model of Jerusalem.

== Biography and academic career ==
Avi-Yonah was born on 26 September 1904 in Lemberg, Galicia (today Lviv, Ukraine) to Dr. Solomon, lawyer and Zionist activist, and Tilla, a teacher. He was brought up a single child in a middle-class, assimilated Jewish house with German orientation and an interest in art. He moved to Mandatory Palestine with his parents in 1919 during the Third Aliyah and in 1921 the family moved to Jerusalem. Upon arrival, his father chose the surname "Avi-Yonah" (meaning "father of Jonah"), and he chose the first name "Michael". In 1923 he graduated from the Rehavia Gymnasium and in 1925 went to England to study classical history and archeology at the University of London, completing his Bachelor of Art in 1928. After returning to Jerusalem, he studied from 1928 to 1931 at the British School of Archaeology in Jerusalem and participated in excavations were at Tel el-Ajjul near Gaza, and the Jerusalem Ophel. At the end of his studies, he joined the Department of Antiquities of the British government of Palestine. He worked as an Assistant Librarian and Records Officer until 1948. During that time he also obtained a Master of Arts degree from the University of London. As a Records Officer he managed the department's archives and introduced a system of recording ancient sites and monuments. He was the editor of fourteen volumes of Quarterly of the Department of Antiquities of Palestine (QDAP).

After the establishment of the State of Israel in 1948, Avi-Yonah became the Research Secretary of the newly founded Department of Antiquities, a position he held until 1953. He was also appointed as external teacher for Byzantine archaeology and historical geography in the Hebrew University of Jerusalem. In 1953 he completed his Doctor of Philosophy degree from the University of London and joined the Hebrew University as Lecturer. In 1958 he was appointed Associate Professor, and in 1963, a Full Professor. He was the editor of more than twenty volumes of the academic journal Eretz-Israel: Archaeological, Historical and Geographical Studies. He was a Visiting Lecturer in Dropsie University, Philadelphia (1953) and a Visiting Professor in the Sapienza University of Rome. He was awarded the Bialik Prize in 1955, the Ben-Zvi Prize in 1971 and the Kadman Prize in 1973.

He succumbed to illness on 26 March 1974, at the age of 69. The 19th volume Eretz-Israel: Archaeological, Historical and Geographical Studies (1987) was published Avi-Yonah's memory.

His son is Reuven Avi-Yonah.

== Research ==
=== Art History ===
Avi-Yonah dedicated a significant portion of his work to the study of ancient art. At the start of his career he focused on Mosaic pavements and lead burial coffins in Palestine. He was interested in the oriental origins of native art in classical and Byzantine Palestine and his finds were summarized in a series of fundamental studies (1944 – 1950) titled Oriental Elements in the Art of Palestine in the Roman and Byzantine. In 1961 he published the book Oriental Art in Roman Palestine on the subject. In Hebrew, he published a general book titled A History of Classical Art. Avi-Yonah also studied ancient Jewish art.

=== Historical Geography ===
The Historical geography of ancient Israel/Palestine in Hellenistic, Roman, and Byzantine periods was a main interest in Avi-Yonah's academic career. In 1936 he published the Map of Roman Palestine and a second revised edition in 1940. In Hebrew he published in 1949 a general study Historical Geography of Palestine: From the End of the Babylonian Exile up to the Arab Conquest which has since been revised several times. It was published in English in 1967 as The Holy Land from the Persian to the Arab Conquests (536 B.C. to A.D. 640): A Historical Geography. He also published the book In the Days of Rome and Byzantium (1946) about Jewish history in Palestine after the Bar Kokhba revolt (132-136 CE), published in German in 1962). In 1954 he published a study of the Madaba Map and edited the Carta's Atlas of the Period of the Second Temple, the Mishna and the Talmud, first published in 1966.

=== History and archaeology of Jerusalem ===
Avi-Yonah engaged in much research on the history, archaeology and topography of Jerusalem. In 1932 he co-edited a concise bibliographical list of Jerusalem's archaeological research, along with Leo Aryeh Mayer. He wrote a number of articles on the city and edited the first volume of the Book of Jerusalem (1955). He was invited to design the 1:50 model of ancient Jerusalem which was once placed at the Holyland Hotel, moved in 2006 to the Israel Museum.

=== Field archaeology ===
As a field archaeologist, Avi-Yonah began his career in 1932, with the clearance of the Isfiya synagogue, a work he conducted with Na'im Makhouly and Nahman Avigad. He excavated at the Roman cemetery in Nahariya (1941), the site of Beth Yerah with Moshe Stekelis (1945–6) the synagogue of Caesarea Maritima (1949, 1968), Masada (1955) and the installation of the Legio X Fretensis in Givat Ram, Jerusalem (1956, 1962).

=== Other fields ===
Avi-Yonah had acquired knowledge in Latin and Ancient Greek and published numerous translation and descriptions of ancient inscriptions of those languages.

== Selected bibliography ==
- Encyclopedia of Archaeological Excavations in the Holy Land
- Jerusalem the Holy
- The Art of Mosaics (cowritten with Richard L. Currier)
- The Holy Land
- Ancient Scrolls
- History of Israel and the Holy Land
- The Jews under Roman and Byzantine Rule: A Political History of Palestine from the Bar Kokhba War to the Arab Conquest
- Views of the Biblical World. Jerusalem: International Publishing Company J-m Ltd, 1959.
- Avi-Yonah, M. (1976). Gazetteer of Roman Palestine. Qedem 5. Institute of Archaeology, Hebrew University of Jerusalem.
- Macmillan Bible Atlas with Yohanan Aharoni (1993)
- Understanding the Bible: Understanding the Maccabean Revolt, 167 to 63 BCE: An Introductory Atlas. Co-author: Shmuel Safrai. Carta Jerusalem. 2019

== See also ==
- Holyland Model of Jerusalem, designed by Avi-Yonah
