= Samal-e Shomali =

Village in Bushehr province, Iran

Samal-e Shomali Persian: سمل شمالي
- Village
- Location within Iran
- Coordinates: 29°06′24″N 51°13′34″E
- Country: Iran
- Province: Bushehr
- County: Tangestan
- District: Central
- Rural District: Ahram

Population (2016)
  - Total: 1,044
- Time zone: UTC+3:30 (IRST)

Samal-e Shomali (Persian: سمل شمالي) (Note: Also romanized as Samal-e Shomālī; also known as Samal) is a village in Ahram Rural District of the Central District in Tangestan County, Bushehr province, Iran.

== Demographics ==
=== Population ===
At the time of the 2006 National Census, the village's population was 829 in 207 households. The following census in 2011 counted 989 people in 268 households. The 2016 census measured the population of the village as 1,044 people in 317 households.
