= Samal-e Jonubi =

Village in Bushehr province, Iran

Samal-e Jonubi Persian: سمل جنوبي
- Village
- Location within Iran
- Coordinates: 29°06′04″N 51°13′41″E
- Country: Iran
- Province: Bushehr
- County: Tangestan
- District: Central
- Rural District: Ahram

Population (2016)
  - Total: 1,172
- Time zone: UTC+3:30 (IRST)

Samal-e Jonubi (Persian: سمل جنوبي) (Note: Also romanized as Samal-e Jonūbī) is a village in Ahram Rural District of the Central District in Tangestan County, Bushehr province, Iran.

== Demographics ==
=== Population ===
At the time of the 2006 National Census, the village's population was 1,067 in 271 households. The following census in 2011 counted 1,114 people in 290 households. The 2016 census measured the population of the village as 1,172 people in 364 households.
