= Pachim Samaria =

- Village
- Location in Assam, India Pachim Samaria (India)
- Coordinates: 26.23°N 91.66°E
- Country: India
- State: Assam
- District: Kamrup

Government
  - Body: Gram panchayat

Languages
  - Official: Assamese
- Time zone: UTC+5:30 (IST)
- PIN: 781136
- Vehicle registration: AS
- Website: kamrup.nic.in

Pachim Samaria is a village in Kamrup, Assam, India. It is situated in north bank of the River Brahmaputra.

== Transport ==
Pachim Samaria is accessible through National Highway 31. All major private commercial vehicles ply between Pachim Samaria and nearby towns.

== See also ==
- Nahira
- Nampara Majarkuri
