= Samrah =

Samrah السمرة
- Village
- Location in Syria
- Coordinates: 35°17′26″N 36°52′14″E
- Country: Syria
- Governorate: Hama
- District: Hama
- Subdistrict: Hama

Population (2004)
  - Total: 1,018
- Time zone: UTC+2 (EET)
  - Summer (DST): UTC+3 (EEST)
- City Qrya Pcode: C3000

Samrah (Arabic: السمرة) is a village in central Syria, administratively part of the Hama Governorate, located northeast of Hama city. According to the Syria Central Bureau of Statistics (CBS), Samrah had a population of 1,018 in the 2004 census. Its inhabitants are Alawites.

== History ==
Samrah was sold by a sheikh of the Bani Khalid, a Bedouin tribe of central Syria, to the Azm family of Hama in 1915, toward the end of Ottoman rule. In the early 20th century, during French Mandatory rule (1923–1946), the Azm family sold the village to the Barazi, another major landowning family of Hama. The inhabitants were Alawite tenant farmers who settled in the village in the 1920s or early 1930s at the initiative of its Hama landlords to cultivate its lands.

== Bibliography ==
- Comité de l'Asie française (April 1933). "Notes sur la propriété foncière dans le Syrie centrale (Notes on Landownership in Central Syria)". Bulletin du Comité de l'Asie française (in French). 33 (309). Comité de l'Asie française: 130–136.
