= Khirbet Shuweika, Hebron =

Khirbet Shuweika (الخليل) خربة شويكة
- Khirbet Shuweika, Hebron
- Location of Khirbet Shuweika, Hebron within Palestine
- Coordinates: 31°24′05″N 35°00′23″E
- Country: Palestine
- Governorate: Hebron Governorate
- Elevation: 675 m (2,215 ft)

Population (1997)
  - Total: 120

Khirbet Shuweika is one of the villages in the Ad-Dhahiriya area in the Hebron Governorate. It is located southwest of the city of Hebron and 17 kilometers south of the West Bank.

== Geography ==
It is approximately 675 meters above sea level. It is bordered to the east by the lands of as-Samu', to the north by the lands of Abu Al-Asja, to the west by the lands of Adh Ad-Dhahiriya, and to the south by Khirbet Zanouta.

== Population ==
The population of Khirbet Shuweika in 2007, according to estimates from the first Palestinian census in 1997, was (120) people.

== See also ==
- Hebron Governorate
- Ad-Dhahiriya
- Sokho
