= Rabud =

- Municipality type D (Village council)

Arabic transcription(s)
  - Arabic: رابود
  - Latin: Khirbet Rabud (official)
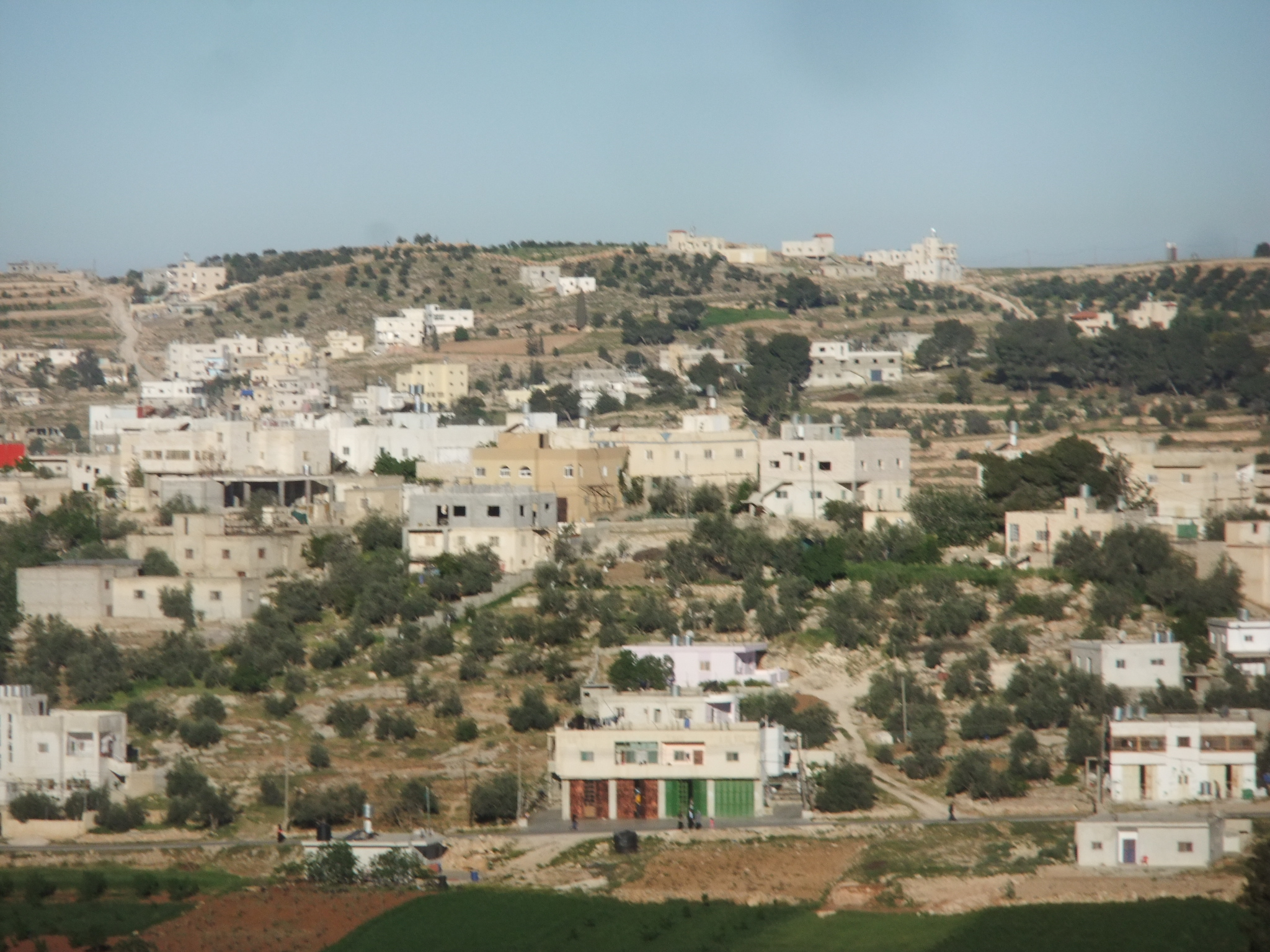
- Rabud

- Location of Rabud within Palestine Location of Rabud within The West Bank
- Coordinates: 31°26′0″N 35°1′0″E
- Palestine grid: 151/093
- State: State of Palestine
- Governorate: Hebron

Government
  - Type: Village council (from 1993)
  - Head of Municipality: Muhammad Huraibat

Area
  - Total: 2.2 km^{2} (0.85 sq mi)

Population (2017)
  - Total: 2,816
  - Density: 1,300/km^{2} (3,300/sq mi)

Rabud (Arabic: رابود, also known as Khirbet Rabud) is a Palestinian village in the southern West Bank, in the Hebron Governorate of the State of Palestine. The village was the site of an ancient Canaanite and Judahite city. The village had a population of 2,816 in 2017.

== Etymology ==
According to Palmer, the name Khirbet Rabud means "the ruin of the animal's lair".

== Demographics ==
Part of the Hebron Governorate of Palestine, it is located 13 kilometers southwest of Hebron and about 5 km northwest of as-Samu. Rabud had a population of 2,262 in the 2007 census by the Palestinian Central Bureau of Statistics (PCBS). According to research by the Applied Research Institute-Jerusalem, Rabud's history dates back to the Canaanite period in Palestine, but the modern inhabitants of the village migrated from the Arabian Peninsula. The principal families are the Huraibat, Quteinah, al-Uqela and Shanan.

== History ==
=== Antiquity ===
Rabud is thought to lie on the site of the ancient Judean Kohanic city of Kiryat Sefer or Debir (Joshua 21:15). The archaeologist William G. Dever estimates its population at around 1,500 during the 9th and 8th centuries BCE. One of the stratigraphic levels at the site (B-II) shows evidence of destruction, likely from Sennacherib's campaign in Judah in the late 8th century, and at least one LMLK jar handle has been found there. By the 7th century BCE, the site of Khirbet Rabud had grown to a relatively large town that featured both a fortified city and an unwalled settlement. Both were razed when the First Temple was destroyed (587-6 BCE). It saw limited settlement during the Persian period.

=== Late Antiquity ===
Ceramics from the Byzantine era have been found here.

=== Ottoman period ===
In 1863, Victor Guérin found here "caves and cisterns dug into the rock, ...small demolished houses and, on the highest point, the remains of a roughly built tower". North and south-east of this place were two pierced walls, with many caves. Guérin named them Heurkan Beni Hasan.

In 1883, the PEF's Survey of Western Palestine found here "walls, cisterns, and rude cave tombs."

=== British Mandate period ===
The 1931 census of Palestine wrote that "the village in the Hebron sub-district commonly known as Dura is a congeries of neighbouring localities each of which has a distinctive name; and, while Dura is a remarkable example of neighbourly agglutination, the phenomenon is not infrequent in other villages". The total of 70 locations, among them Kh. Rabud, listed in the report had 1538 occupied houses and a population of 7255 Muslims.

=== Jordanian period ===
In the wake of the 1948 Arab–Israeli War, and after the 1949 Armistice Agreements, Rabud came under Jordanian rule.

In 1961, the population of Rabud was 206.

=== Post-1967 ===
After the Six-Day War in 1967, Rabud has been under Israeli occupation.

A village council was established by the Palestinian National Authority in 1993 to administer Rabud's civil affairs and provide limited municipal services. There is currently one mosque, Salah ad-Din Mosque, which serves the village.

== Bibliography ==
- Conder, C.R.; Kitchener, H.H. (1883). The Survey of Western Palestine: Memoirs of the Topography, Orography, Hydrography, and Archaeology. Vol. 3. London: Committee of the Palestine Exploration Fund.
- Dauphin, C. (1998). La Palestine byzantine, Peuplement et Populations. BAR International Series 726 (in French). Vol. III : Catalogue. Oxford: Archeopress. ISBN 0-860549-05-4.
- Government of Jordan, Department of Statistics (1964). First Census of Population and Housing. Volume I: Final Tables; General Characteristics of the Population (PDF).
- Guérin, V. (1869). Description Géographique Historique et Archéologique de la Palestine (in French). Vol. 1: Judee, pt. 3. Paris: L'Imprimerie Nationale.
- Mills, E., ed. (1932). Census of Palestine 1931. Population of Villages, Towns and Administrative Areas. Jerusalem: Government of Palestine.
- Palmer, E.H. (1881). The Survey of Western Palestine: Arabic and English Name Lists Collected During the Survey by Lieutenants Conder and Kitchener, R. E. Transliterated and Explained by E.H. Palmer. Committee of the Palestine Exploration Fund.
