= Samra Turajlic =

Medical oncologist and cancer researcher

Dr Samra Turajlic
- Education: University of Oxford; UCL Medical School; Institute of Cancer Research
- Scientific career
- Fields: Cancer evolution, kidney cancer, melanoma
- Workplaces: Royal Marsden NHS Foundation Trust the Francis Crick Institute
- Thesis: (2003)
- Doctoral advisor: Richard Marais
- Other academic advisors: Charles Swanton

Samra Turajlic is a medical oncologist and cancer researcher. She leads the cancer dynamics lab at the Francis Crick Institute in London, which focuses on understanding how cancers evolve, as well as working as an oncologist at the Royal Marsden.

Her work has revealed that kidney cancers follow a set number of evolutionary paths, each with its own set of genetic changes. This discovery could help to distinguish between aggressive cancers that require treatment and more benign tumours that can be monitored.

She was elected a Fellow of the Academy of Medical Sciences in 2026.

== Education and early career ==
Turajlic studied medicine at Oxford University, graduating in 1999 before continuing her medical training at UCL Medical School. She completed her PhD in Richard Marais' lab at the Institute of Cancer Research, where she worked on the first ever targeted treatment for melanoma skin cancer. She then joined Charles Swanton's team as a clinician scientist in 2014, funded by Cancer Research UK. Together, they developed the TRACERx Renal project, which studies how kidney cancer evolves over time. In 2015, she completed her training in medical oncology and became a consultant medical oncologist at the Royal Marsden, specialising in skin and urological cancers.

She went on to form her own lab at the Francis Crick Institute, becoming a group leader in 2019. She divides her time between the clinic and her lab.

She is a Trustee of the Kidney Cancer Support Network and Melanoma Focus, and a senior editor for Macmillan Cancer Support.

== Research ==
=== Kidney cancer ===
Turajlic is the Chief Clinical Investigator and Chief Scientific Investigator for the TRACERx Renal, which aims to map how kidney cancer evolves over time. By developing techniques to analyse a cancer's history, her work has revealed that kidney cancers follow a set number of evolutionary paths, each with its own distinct set of genetic changes. Publishing their work in Cell, the team found that kidney cancers could be classified into three broad categories based on changes in their DNA: very aggressive, benign and intermediate. She was awarded a Cancer Research UK Advanced Clinician Scientist Fellowship in February 2020 to continue work on kidney cancer evolution.

=== Melanoma ===
In April 2020, Turajlic was awarded a grant from the Melanoma Research Alliance to study how melanoma spreads to other parts of the body by metastasis. Working with patients at the Royal Marsden and samples gathered through the Melanoma TRACERx and PEACE programmes, the team are aiming to investigate the timing and pattern of melanoma metastasis.

=== Von Hippel-Lindau disease ===
In May 2020, her lab was awarded a grant from the National Institute of Health (NIH) to study Von Hippel-Lindau disease. They will be collaborating with the NIH's Marston Lineham to understand why tumours develop in some parts of the body but not others in people with Von-Hippel Lindau disease.

=== Representative sequencing ===
In May 2020, she and others at the Francis Crick Institute reported a new way to analyse surgically removed tumours by representative sampling, which gives a more complete picture of the genetic changes within the tumour. Instead of analysing individual samples taken from the tumour, the new technique mixes cells from different areas of the tumour together. The technique, which could help identify changes that can be targeted by treatment, is now being tested at The Royal Marsden.
