= Al-Burj, Hebron =

Village in West Bank, Palestine

al-Burj
- Municipality type D (Village council)

Arabic transcription(s)
  - Arabic: البرج
- Location of al-Burj within Palestine
- Coordinates: 31°25′57″N 34°55′24″E
- Palestine grid: 141/094
- State: State of Palestine
- Governorate: Hebron

Government
  - Type: Village council

Population (2017)
  - Total: 3,205
- Name meaning: Burj el Beiyârah, the tower of the wells

Al-Burj (Arabic: البرج) is a Palestinian village located twenty kilometers (12 mi) southwest of Hebron, in the Hebron Governorate of State of Palestine, in the southern West Bank. According to the Palestinian Central Bureau of Statistics, the village had a population of 3,205 in 2017. The primary health care facilities for the village are designated by the Ministry of Health as level 2. Al-Burj is the birth place of Tareq Talahma, Acting Director of the United Nations Office for the Coordination of Humanitarian Affairs.

== History ==
Ceramics from the Byzantine era have been found here.

=== Ottoman era ===
In 1838, Edward Robinson noted el-Burj as a place "in ruins or deserted," part of the area between the mountains and Gaza, but subject to the government of el-Khulil. Robinson further noted: "The ruins here consists of the remains of a square fortress, about two hundred feet on a side, situated directly upon the surface the projecting hill [..] On the eastern and southern sides a trench has been hewn out in the rock, which sees to have extended quite around the fortress. The walls are mostly broken down [..] the general appearance of the ruin is decidedly that of a Saracenic structure; and I am disposed to regard it as one of the line of strong Saracenic or Turkish fortresses, which appears once to have been drawn along the southern frontier of Palestine. Of these we had now listed four, viz. at Kurmul, Semua, Dhoheriyeh, and this at el-Burj".

In 1863 Victor Guérin called the place Khirbet el-Bordj and noted a maqam, shaped like a tower and dedicated to a Sheikh Mahmoud. He also noted "several caves, some of which are used today as refuge for the shepherds, when they come to graze their herds on this mountain."

In 1883, the PEF's Survey of Palestine described the place, which they called Burj el Beiyarah: "Remains of a fort 200 feet side, with a fosse on the east and south, hewn in rock. Foundations only remain of small masonry, with the joints packed with smaller stones. Round it are caves in the rocks."

=== British Mandate era ===
At the time of the 1931 census of Palestine the population of al Burj was counted under Dura.

=== Jordanian era ===
In the wake of the 1948 Arab–Israeli War, and after the 1949 Armistice Agreements, al-Burj came under Jordanian rule.

On 25 February 1953, five Arab shepherds were killed and mutilated by Israel in the so called The Har-Zion Affair at al-Burj, including a 16-year-old.

In 1961, the population of Burj was 712.

=== 1967, aftermath ===
After the Six-Day War in 1967, al-Burj has been under Israeli occupation.

== Bibliography ==
- Conder, C.R.; Kitchener, H.H. (1883). The Survey of Western Palestine: Memoirs of the Topography, Orography, Hydrography, and Archaeology. Vol. 3. London: Committee of the Palestine Exploration Fund.
- Dauphin, C. (1998). La Palestine byzantine, Peuplement et Populations. BAR International Series 726 (in French). Vol. III : Catalogue. Oxford: Archeopress. ISBN 0-860549-05-4.
- Government of Jordan, Department of Statistics (1964). First Census of Population and Housing. Volume I: Final Tables; General Characteristics of the Population (PDF).
- Guérin, V. (1869). Description Géographique Historique et Archéologique de la Palestine (in French). Vol. 1: Judee, pt. 2. Paris: L'Imprimerie Nationale.
- Mills, E., ed. (1932). Census of Palestine 1931. Population of Villages, Towns and Administrative Areas. Jerusalem: Government of Palestine.
- Morris, B. (1993). Israel's Border Wars 1949–1956: Arab Infiltration, Israeli Retaliation, and the Countdown to the Suez War. Oxford: Clarendon Press. ISBN 0-19-827850-0.
- Palmer, E.H. (1881). The Survey of Western Palestine: Arabic and English Name Lists Collected During the Survey by Lieutenants Conder and Kitchener, R. E. Transliterated and Explained by E.H. Palmer. Committee of the Palestine Exploration Fund.
- Robinson, E.; Smith, E. (1841). Biblical Researches in Palestine, Mount Sinai and Arabia Petraea: A Journal of Travels in the year 1838. Vol. 3. Boston: Crocker & Brewster.
