= Samaras =

Samaras (Greek: Σαμαράς; feminine: Samara) is a Greek surname meaning 'saddler'. Notable people with the surname include:

- Antonis Samaras (born 1951), Greek politician; Prime Minister of Greece, 2012–15
- Georgios Samaras (born 1985), Greek footballer
- Ioannis Samaras (born 1961), Greek footballer
- Katherine Samaras, Australian endocrinologist
- Kos Samaras (born 1970/71), Australian political consultant
- Lucas Samaras (1936–2024), Greek-American photographer, sculptor and painter
- Nikos Samaras (1970–2013), Greek volleyball player
- Nick Samaras (born 1952), American poet
- Spyridon Samaras (1861–1917), Greek composer
- Tim Samaras (1957–2013), American weather researcher and "storm chaser"
- Tryphon Samaras (born 1969), Greek hairdresser and television personality
