= Ad-Dhahiriya =

Municipality type A in Hebron, West Bank, Palestine

Ad-Dhahiriya الظاهرية
- Municipality type A (City)

Arabic transcription(s)
  - Arabic: الظاهرية
  - Latin: al-Dhahiriya (official) az-Zahiriya (unofficial)
- Location of ad-Dhahiriya within Palestine Location of ad-Dhahiriya within the West Bank
- Coordinates: 31°24′28″N 34°58′20″E
- Palestine grid: 147/090
- State: Palestine
- Governorate: Hebron

Government
  - Type: City

Population (2017)
  - Total: 35,924
- Name meaning: "The village on the ridge"

Ad-Dhahiriya (also az-Zahiriya) (Arabic: الظاهرية) is a city in the Hebron Governorate of Palestine, 22 km southwest of the city of Hebron in the southern West Bank. According to the Palestinian Central Bureau of Statistics, ad-Dhahiriya had a population of 35,924 in 2017.

== History ==
=== ِِArchaeology ===
Conder and Kitchener, during the Survey of Western Palestine in the 1870s, found ad-Dhahiriya undermined by ancient caves. In the centre of ad-Dhahiriya was a tower, which appeared to be from before the Crusader era, possibly from early Christian or Roman period.

Local tradition, supported by archaeology, have that modern day ad-Dhahiriya was founded by the Mamluk sultan Baybars (r. 1260–1277), whose regnal title was 'al-Dhahir'. The modern village was refounded after the 16th century.

=== Ottoman period ===
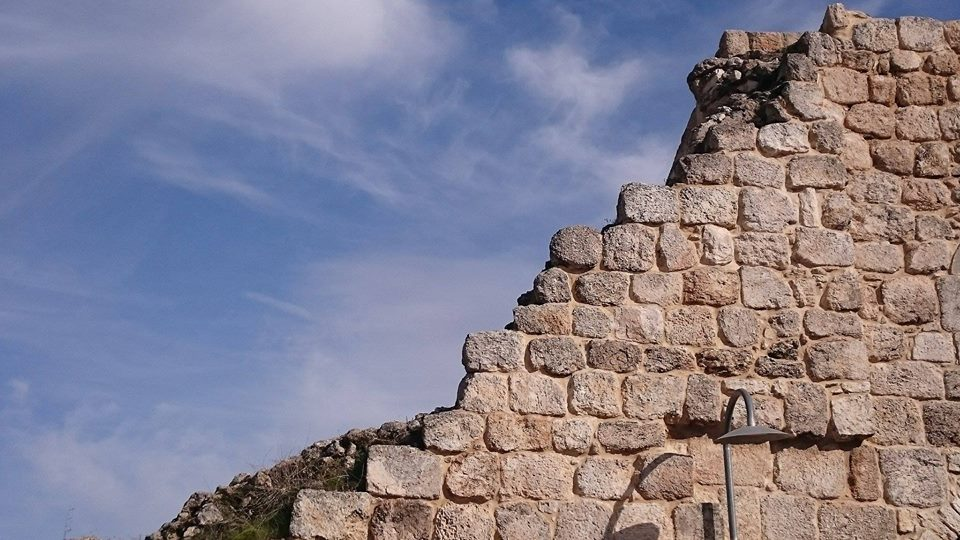
Ruins in the historical core of Dhahiriya

In 1838, Edward Robinson noted ad-Dhahiriya was a village located southwest of Hebron. Robinson further remarked: "A castle or fortress apparently once stood here; the remains of a square tower are still to be seen, now used as a dwelling; and the door-ways of many hovels are of hewn stone with arches. It would seem to have been one of the line of small fortresses, which apparently once existed all along the southern border of Palestine. The village contains, according to the government census, one hundred full-grown men; of whom thirty-eight had been taken at three separate times for the Egyptian army. Though half in ruins, it is yet rich in flocks and herds, and has at least hundred camels. The inhabitants are Hudhr, or townsmen; and belonging to the party called Keis. Most of the villagers in this quarter are of this party; as well as some of the Bedawin."

In 1856, a Scottish clergyman, Horatius Bonar described the village and its ruined castle: "Suddenly, at an abrupt elbow of the ravine, we are relieved by seeing the old castle, perched on its rocky height well in the setting sun; the poor village, which seems to hang about it, with its square yellow huts, rather helps, at this distance, to improve its appearance, and to give dignity to its towers and broken ramparts. From this point it looks much bolder and substantial than it is; not so isolated as El-Aujeh, which we passed some days ago, but well-set upon yon craggy perch. Like most of its fellow castles in the east and border "peels" in the north, it has seen better days, and has at one time, been a noble stronghold for Romans, or Crusaders, or Turks..."

In 1863 the French traveler Victor Guérin visited the place, and found that many of the men had fled, mostly further south in tents, in order to avoid conscription. He noted one building, measuring sixteen steps on each side which was built in beautiful stone. It contained several vaulted chambers, and was the home of one of the sheikhs of the village. Several other private houses were also built with fine materials, from old buildings; some even seemed to date, either entirely or only in their lower courses from the Roman period.

An Ottoman village list of about 1870 indicated 57 houses and a population of 206, though the population count included men, only. According to the PEF's Survey of Western Palestine, (SWP), the village had a population of 300-400 in 1874. In 1877, it was deserted due to "encroachment of the Arabs [Bedouins] into the country of the fellahin". According to the geographer David Grossman, the Bedouins were allies of the nearby town of Dura.

=== British Mandatory period ===
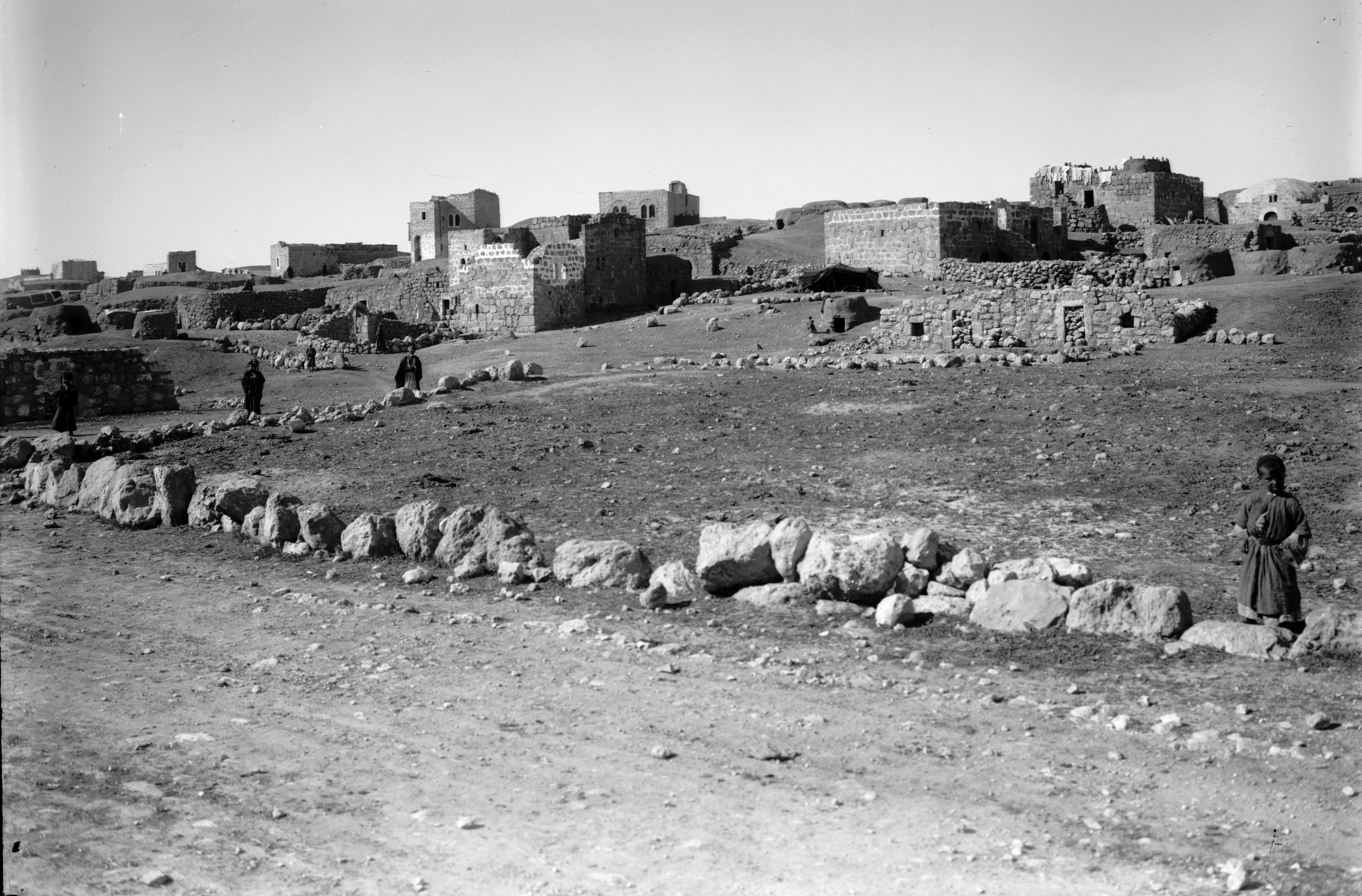
Ad-Dhahiriya in the 1920s

In 1921, a violent conflict erupted between the residents of ad-Dhahiriya and Dura. It was resolved through the imposition of a hefty fine of 20,000 Egyptian pounds on the "brigands" of Dura.

In the 1922 census of Palestine conducted by the British Mandate authorities, ad-Dhahiriya had an entirely Muslim population of 2,266 inhabitants, increasing in the 1931 census to 2,930, still all Muslim, in 603 houses. In the 1945 statistics the population of Ad-Dhahiriya was 3,760, all Muslims, who owned 60,585 dunams of land according to an official land and population survey. 166 dunams were plantations and irrigable land, 54,205 for cereals, while 284 dunams were built-up (urban) land.

Ad-Dhahiriya is the hometown of ʿĪsā Sulaymān al-Baṭṭāṭ, a rebel commander during the 1936–1939 Arab revolt. His family used to cultivate land and raise animals along the arid southern margins of the Hebron Hills and it belonged to the al-Maṭariyya village coalition. At the beginning of the revolt, Battat’s gang attacked the ad-Dhahiriyya police station and stole its armory. By 1938, al-Battat commanded fifty to sixty fighters across the western Hebron district. In January 1938 al-Battat assassinated British archaeologist J. L. Starkey. In May of the same year, British authorities reported in that Battat had been killed at ad-Dhahiriyya, although Palestinian and Zionist sources cited by Roy Marom and Yosef Garfinkel record his death at Bayt Jibrin due to internal rebel rivalries.

=== Jordanian period ===
In the wake of the 1948 Arab–Israeli War, and after the 1949 Armistice Agreements, ad-Dhahiriya came under Jordanian rule. The first village council was established in 1963.

The Jordanian census of 1961 found 4,199 inhabitants in Ad-Dhahiriya. In 1963, a village council was established to administer al-Dhahiriya.

=== 1967, aftermath ===
Since the Six-Day War in 1967, ad-Dhahiriya has been under Israeli occupation. The population in the 1967 census conducted by the Israeli authorities was 4,875. Since 1995, it has been governed by the Palestinian National Authority as part of Area A of the West Bank.

In 1996, the Palestinian Authority appointed a municipal council. In 2004, a 13-member council was elected with paid employees.

The primary health care facilities for the municipality are designated by the Ministry of Health as level 3.

According to the Office for the Coordination of Humanitarian Affairs (OCHA), the entrance to the village was closed by an IDF earth mound on 14 April 2005, forcing all Palestinians in the area to travel via Dura.

== Geography ==
The town's municipal area spans about 98,000 dunams, of which roughly 16,000 dunams are built-up and nearly 23,000 are cultivated. Abutting localities include as-Samu' to the east, al-Burj, Rabud and Kurza to the north, and al-Ramadin to the west. The Green Line bounds ad-Dhahiriya to the south.

== Economy ==
Ad-Dhahiriya's location has made it a commercial center for more than 100,000 residents of the Negev Desert, in addition to being a central gathering point for workers who work in the city of Beersheba, both within the Green Line, from the surrounding southern West Bank areas. According to the records of the municipality, over 1,040 commercial licenses have been issued to professionals and organizations provide a wide range of goods and services, including a comprehensive market to meet the needs of citizens. It is also the home to one of the most important livestock markets in the Palestinian territories.

Ad-Dhahiriya's workforce is composed of 68.6% of its population, of which 52% work within the borders of the Green Line, 17% in official government capacities, 15% in agriculture, 11% in trade and 5% in the manufacturing industry.

== Culture ==
The old town of ad-Dhahiriya is considered an important site of historical heritage, consisting of 972 structures of historical architectural significance, representing 2.5% of all such buildings within Palestine. Initiatives from donors and the municipality have restored several historical buildings and courtyards. They have invested services and centers for tourists. The most prominent landmarks in Ad-Dhahiriya is the building known as "Al Khawkha", a compound in the old town. Today it has become a center named after Fawzi Pasha, a former leader of the Ottoman Army who constructed a fort with buildings characterized by their distinct architecture of bows and stripes. Also, there are rock wells and caves exhibiting harmonious geometric architecture. In addition to the old town, a number of archaeological sites exist in the villages and hamlets surrounding Ad-Dhahiriya dating back to various historical periods. The most notable of these include Kafr Jul, al-Ras, Deir al-Loz, Um Sir, al-Rawha, al-Ja'bari, Asilah, Badghosh, Deir Sa'idah, Deir al-Hawa, Atir, Umm al-Dimnah, Tell Awad and Umm al-Nakhla.

=== Annab Church ===
The Byzantine Anab Church (31°23′47″N 34°55′54″E), dated circa 600 CE, is one of the rare churches that was discovered during the last fifteen years in Palestine. The Church is a rectangular basilica, with its length from east to west being twice the width from north to south, with a space of 700 square meters. The mosaic floors of the Church need to be renovated, and the road to the Church has to be paved.

=== Tomb of Ahmad al-Ghumari ===
Dhahiriya is home to the tomb site of ash-Sheikh Ahmad al-Ghumari, a 14th-century Sufi saint renowned for his knowledge of Islamic traditions and authorship of several books. According to tradition, he arrived from his birthplace of Ghomar, Morocco, by flying on a stone that is still displayed near his tomb in the southern part of town. After making a pilgrimage to Mecca and then visiting Jerusalem, he settled in Dhahiriya. His descendants, now numbering in the thousands, reside in the area of Hebron.

== Sports ==
The people of Ad-Dhahiriya are united by their love for sports, especially football. The town's football team, Shabab Al-Dhahiriya SC, which is known as the Deers of the South, is one of the best teams on the national level. It was established in 1974 by a group of young amateurs and became a nationally recognized club that won several national championships, most notable of which were: West Bank Cup (1983), Palestinian Union Cup (2005), Abu Ammar Cup (2012, 2015),Palestine Cup (2012, 2014), as well as the recent Jawwal cup, in addition to several other formal and informal titles and championships.

=== Amusement park ===
The municipality had erected Abu Kharrouba park in the southwest part of the city, on an area exceeding 20 dunams, which was a landfill site in the past. In 2015, the municipality established a self-funded amusement park, the first of its kind in the region, which the municipality develops continuously.

== Bibliography ==
- Barron, J.B., ed. (1923). Palestine: Report and General Abstracts of the Census of 1922. Government of Palestine.
- Bonar, H. (1858). The land of promise; notes of a Spring-journey from Beersheba to Sidon. New York: R. Carter & Brothers.
- Conder, C.R.; Kitchener, H.H. (1883). The Survey of Western Palestine: Memoirs of the Topography, Orography, Hydrography, and Archaeology. Vol. 3. London: Committee of the Palestine Exploration Fund. (+special papers p. 36)
- Government of Jordan, Department of Statistics (1964). First Census of Population and Housing. Volume I: Final Tables; General Characteristics of the Population (PDF).
- Government of Palestine, Department of Statistics (1945). Village Statistics, April, 1945.
- Guérin, V. (1869). Description Géographique Historique et Archéologique de la Palestine (in French). Vol. 1: Judee, pt. 3. Paris: L'Imprimerie Nationale.
- Hadawi, S. (1970). Village Statistics of 1945: A Classification of Land and Area ownership in Palestine. Palestine Liberation Organization Research Center. Archived from the original on 8 December 2018.
- Hartmann, M. (1883). "Die Ortschaftenliste des Liwa Jerusalem in dem türkischen Staatskalender für Syrien auf das Jahr 1288 der Flucht (1871)". Zeitschrift des Deutschen Palästina-Vereins. 6: 102–149.
- Mills, E., ed. (1932). Census of Palestine 1931. Population of Villages, Towns and Administrative Areas. Jerusalem: Government of Palestine.
- Palmer, E.H. (1881). The Survey of Western Palestine: Arabic and English Name Lists Collected During the Survey by Lieutenants Conder and Kitchener, R. E. Transliterated and Explained by E.H. Palmer. Committee of the Palestine Exploration Fund.
- Pringle, D. (1997). Secular buildings in the Crusader Kingdom of Jerusalem: an archaeological Gazetter. Cambridge University Press. ISBN 0521-46010-7.
- Rajab, J. (1989). Palestinian Costume. Indiana University. ISBN 0-7141-2517-2. (contains several striking costumes from Ad-Dhahiriya reproduced from the Rajab Collection, Kuwait.)
- Robinson, E.; Smith, E. (1841). Biblical Researches in Palestine, Mount Sinai and Arabia Petraea: A Journal of Travels in the year 1838. Vol. 1. Boston: Crocker & Brewster.
- Robinson, E.; Smith, E. (1841). Biblical Researches in Palestine, Mount Sinai and Arabia Petraea: A Journal of Travels in the year 1838. Vol. 2. Boston: Crocker & Brewster.
- Robinson, E.; Smith, E. (1841). Biblical Researches in Palestine, Mount Sinai and Arabia Petraea: A Journal of Travels in the year 1838. Vol. 3. Boston: Crocker & Brewster.
- Socin, A. (1879). "Alphabetisches Verzeichniss von Ortschaften des Paschalik Jerusalem". Zeitschrift des Deutschen Palästina-Vereins. 2: 135–163.
- Toledano, E. (1984). "The Sanjaq of Jerusalem in the Sixteenth Century: Aspects of Topography and Population". Archivum Ottomanicum. 9: 279–319. Archived from the original on 5 March 2016.
