= Baptism Site International Orthodox University =

University in Al-Maghtas, Jordan

- جامعة المغطس الأرثوذكسية الدولية
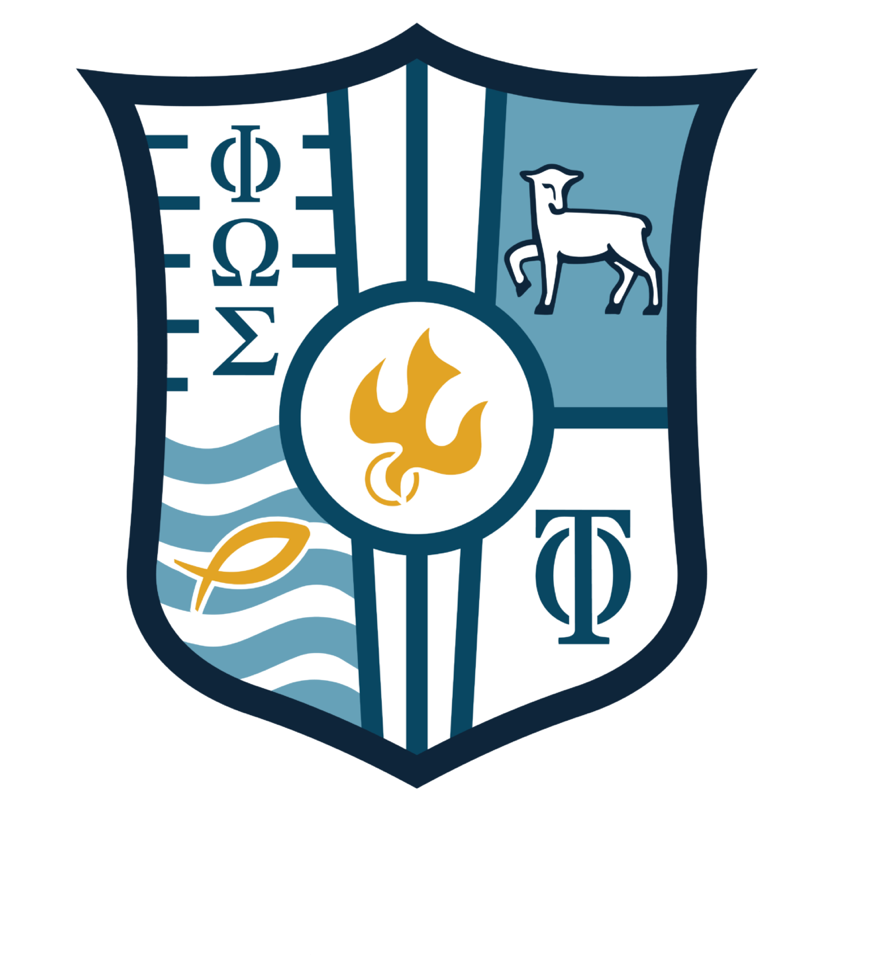
- Established: May 18, 2026
- Parent institution: Greek Orthodox Patriarchate of Jerusalem
- Religious affiliation: Eastern Orthodoxy
- Location: Balqa Governorate, Jordan; 31°50′49″N 35°35′0″E
- Language: ِArabic, English
- Website: biou.jo

The Baptism Site International Orthodox University (Arabic: جامعة المغطس الأرثوذكسية الدولية), also known as B.I.O. Uni, is a university in Al-Maghtas, Jordan, overseen by the Greek Orthodox Patriarchate of Jerusalem. Al-Maghtas is a UNESCO world heritage site where Jesus is believed to have been baptized. Its inception is linked to the Jordanian initiative to celebrate the 2,000th anniversary of Jesus's baptism in the year 2030. It is described as the first Christian university in Jordan. The university's construction was funded by donations from King Abdullah II, and businessmen Mark Voloshin, Samer Khoury, and Michel Sayegh.

The BIO University was inaugurated by King Abdullah II and the Greek Orthodox patriarch of Jerusalem, Theophilos III, on 18 May 2026, which was attended by various Jordanian government officials and church heads from Jordan. At the inauguration, the patriarch described Jordan "as a living pillar of Christian presence, inter-religious dignity, and responsible stewardship in a region burdened by conflict, fragmentation, and spiritual displacement." David Alexei, grandson of Mark Voloshin, said that the vision for the university has become reality thanks to King Abdullah's support. The university's website was launched on 24 August 2026.

== Curriculum ==
The university offers one undergraduate program and three graduate programs, with a total capacity of 40 domestic and international students. It will welcome its first batch of students starting October 2026.

=== Degree programs ===
The four programs offered are:

- B.A. in Theology, Philosophy, Law, and Languages (TPLL)
- M.A. in Orthodox Canon Law
- M.A. in Spiritual Exchange and Christian Orthodox - Islamic Dialogue
- M.A. in Orthodox Spirituality

=== Special programs ===
The university offers two programs in addition to its degree courses: the Great Books Program and the Spiritual Retreat Program.

The Great Books Program extends over four years and is taken alongside undergraduate study. It consists of readings from approximately 50 works representing fields including philosophy, religion, history, science, and Christian thought. The program is assessed on a pass or fail basis, without academic credit, and is also available to students of other universities. While the Spiritual Retreat Program is held at Al-Maghtas.

== See also ==
- Al-Maghtas
- Museum of Jesus' Baptism
