= Museum of Jesus' Baptism =

A Museum of Jesus' Baptism is a proposed museum in Jordan that will be built in Al-Maghtas, the purported site of the baptism of Jesus. It will be situated at Bethany Beyond the Jordan, a UNESCO World Heritage Site. The seven architectural finalists were announced in October 2025. The winner is expected to be announced in 2026.

The museum is supported by The Church of Jesus Christ of Latter-day Saints. It is expected to be opened in 2030 for the 2,000 anniversary of Jesus's baptism. The Jordanian government is planning to invest $100 million in Al-Maghtas to attract Christian tourists to the region.
