= Aenon =

Biblical site linked to John the Baptist

Coordinates: 31°50′15″N 35°32′58″E

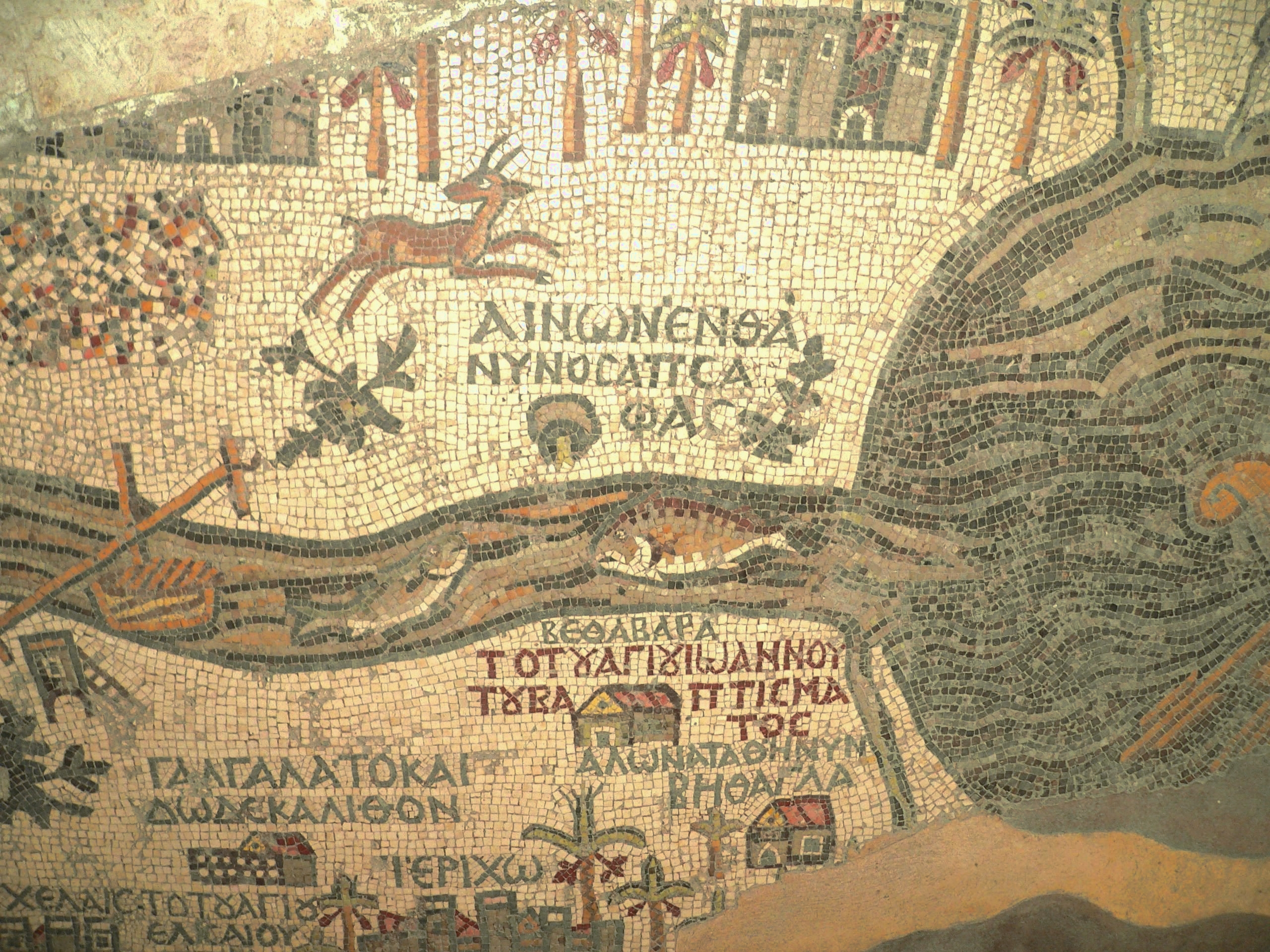
Aenon marked on the 6th-century Madaba Map, marked as Ainon, where is now Sapsaphas.

Aenon (Ancient Greek: Αἰνών, Ainṓn), distinguished as Aenon near Salim, is the site mentioned by the Gospel of John John 3:23) as one of the places where John was baptising people, after baptizing Jesus in Bethany-beyond-the-Jordan.

== Etymology ==
Aenon is the Hellenized form of the term for 'spring' or 'natural fountain' in many Semitic languages, including Hebrew ayn (עין) and Arabic ain or ein (عين). In the water-poor Middle East, places owning a spring tend to be named after that water source, so that toponyms consisting of or containing the construct element are common. The particular site mentioned in the Gospel of John is therefore distinguished as "Aenon near Salim".

The name Aenon is commonly used amongst Baptist organizations and churches.

== Identification attempts ==
=== Information from the Gospel ===
Neither "Aenon" nor "Salim" is a unique name, and the Gospel text offers only two additional hints about where Aenon might be located: the most direct information is that "there was plenty of water there" (John 3:22), and the second is that it was west of the River Jordan because at Aenon John's disciples talk of the site where John first encountered Jesus as being "on the other side of the Jordan" (John 3:26) which is taken to mean east of the river. We also know from John 1:28 that that first encounter happened at "Bethany-beyond-the-Jordan", named relative to the entrance of the Hebrews from the desert during the Exodus.

=== 'Ainun in Wadi Far'a ===
One possible location is near the upper source of the Wadi Far'a, an open valley extending from Mount Ebal to the Jordan River, which is full of springs. There is a place called 'Ainun four miles north of the springs.

=== Eusebius: Saloumias south of Scythopolis ===
Another possible location, which is by Eusebius' description in his Onomasticon (written before AD 324), is at "a village in the (Jordan) valley, at the eighth milestone from Scythopolis (Beit She'an), ... called Salumias." This view was already supported by the 19th-century Smith's Bible Dictionary and the 1915 International Standard Bible Encyclopedia and is still favoured by some.

=== Madaba Map: east of the Jordan near Jericho ===
In addition to Aenon near Salem, the 6th-century Madaba Map shows a second Aenon right across the Jordan from Bethabara, near Jericho. In the Gospel of John, "Bethany-beyond-the-Jordan" is indicated as the place where Jesus was baptized by John; in some translations of the Bible, the name Bethany is instead transcribed as "Bethabara" (1:28). On the Madaba Map, Bethabara is on the right bank of the Jordan, while this Aenon is on the left.

== Religious significance ==
Aenon is the site mentioned by the Gospel of John (3:23) as one of the places where John was baptising people, after baptizing Jesus in Bethany-beyond-the-Jordan.

== See also ==
- Al Maghtas, the traditional site of Jesus' baptism
  - Qasr el Yahud, the western (West Bank) side of Al Maghtas
- Baptism of Jesus
- Bethabara, a name used by some versions of the New Testament for the site of Jesus' baptism
- Chronology of Jesus
- Ministry of Jesus
- New Testament places associated with Jesus
