= Al-Maghtas =

Archaeological site in Jordan

- المغطس (Arabic)
- Bethany Beyond the Great Jordan
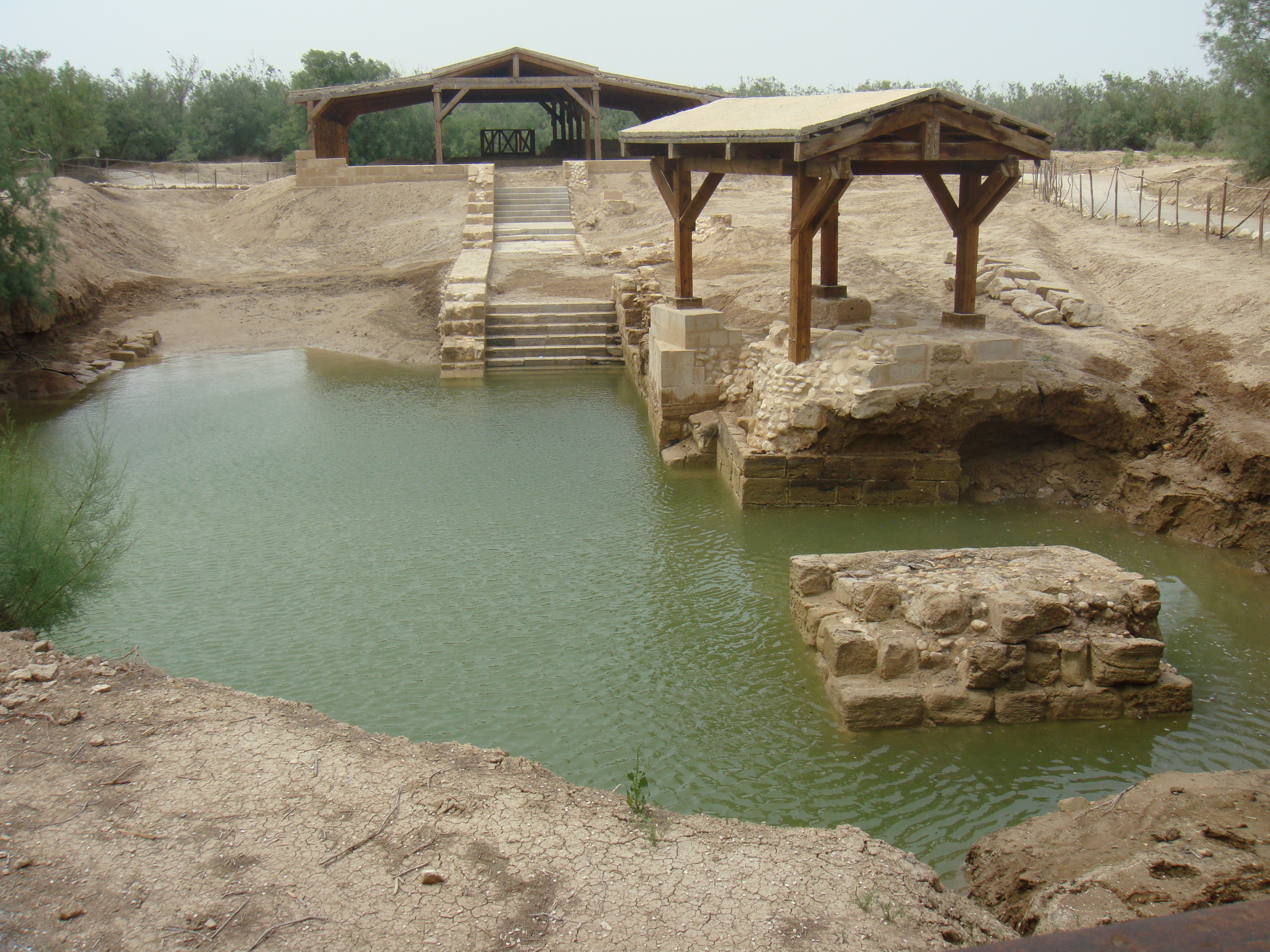
- Excavation of baptism site

- Location within Jordan
- 31°50′14″N 35°33′01″E
- Location: Balqa Governorate, Jordan

Site notes
- Website: www.baptismsite.com

UNESCO World Heritage Site
- Official name: Baptism Site "Bethany Beyond the Jordan" (Al-Maghtas)
- Criteria: Cultural: (iii)(vi)
- Reference: 1446
- Inscription: 2015 (39th Session)
- Area: 294.155 ha (1.13574 sq mi)
- Buffer zone: 957.178 ha (3.69568 sq mi)

Al-Maghtas (Arabic: المغطس, romanized: al-Maghṭas, lit. 'the Baptism' or 'the Immersion'), officially known as Baptism Site "Bethany Beyond the Jordan", is an archaeological World Heritage Site in Jordan, on the east bank of the Jordan River, reputed to be the location of the Baptism of Jesus by John the Baptist and venerated as such since at least the Byzantine period. The place has also been referred to as Bethabara (Hebrew: בית עברה) and historically Bethany (בית עניה) or Bethany Beyond the Great Jordan (see below).

Al-Maghtas includes two principal archaeological areas: the remnants of a monastery on a mound known as Jabal Mar-Elias (جبل مار إلياس, 'Elijah's Hill') and an area close to the river with remains of churches, baptism ponds and pilgrim and hermit dwellings. The two areas are connected by a stream called Wadi Kharrar (وادي خرار).

The strategic location between Jerusalem and the King's Highway is already evident from the Book of Joshua report about the Israelites crossing the Jordan there. Jabal Mar-Elias is traditionally identified as the site of the ascension of the prophet Elijah to heaven. The complete area was abandoned after the 1967 Six-Day War, when both banks of the Jordan became part of the frontline. The area was heavily mined then.

After the signing of the Israel–Jordan peace treaty in 1994, de-mining of the area soon took place at the initiative of Jordanian Prince Ghazi. The site has since then seen several archaeological digs, visits by Popes John Paul II, Benedict XVI, and Francis and by many other heads of state, and attracts tourists and pilgrimage activity. In 2015, the eastern side of the site was designated as a World Heritage Site of Jordan by UNESCO, excluding the western side of the river which is part of the tentative list of World Heritage Sites in Palestine since 2015. Approximately 81,000 people visited the site in 2016, mostly European, American, and Arab tourists. Thousands flock to the site on January 6 to mark Epiphany.

== Names ==
=== Bethany ===
Two passages from the Gospel of John indicate a place "beyond the Jordan" or "across the Jordan":

John 1:28: These things took place in Bethany beyond the Jordan, where John was baptising. This is the only mention of this "Bethany on the East bank of the Jordan" in the New Testament.
John 10:40: He [Jesus] went away again across the Jordan to the place where John had been baptizing earlier, and he remained there.

"Bethany" may come from bēṯ ‛ăniyāh (בית עניה), Hebrew for 'house of the poor/afflicted'. The name "Bethany" is shared with a different town located on the Mount of Olives, mentioned many times in the New Testament. Most English versions of the New Testament refer to "Bethany on the east bank of the Jordan River" (including the Douay-Rheims, NIV, NASB, NLT, RSV, IBS, and Darby).

=== Bethabara ===
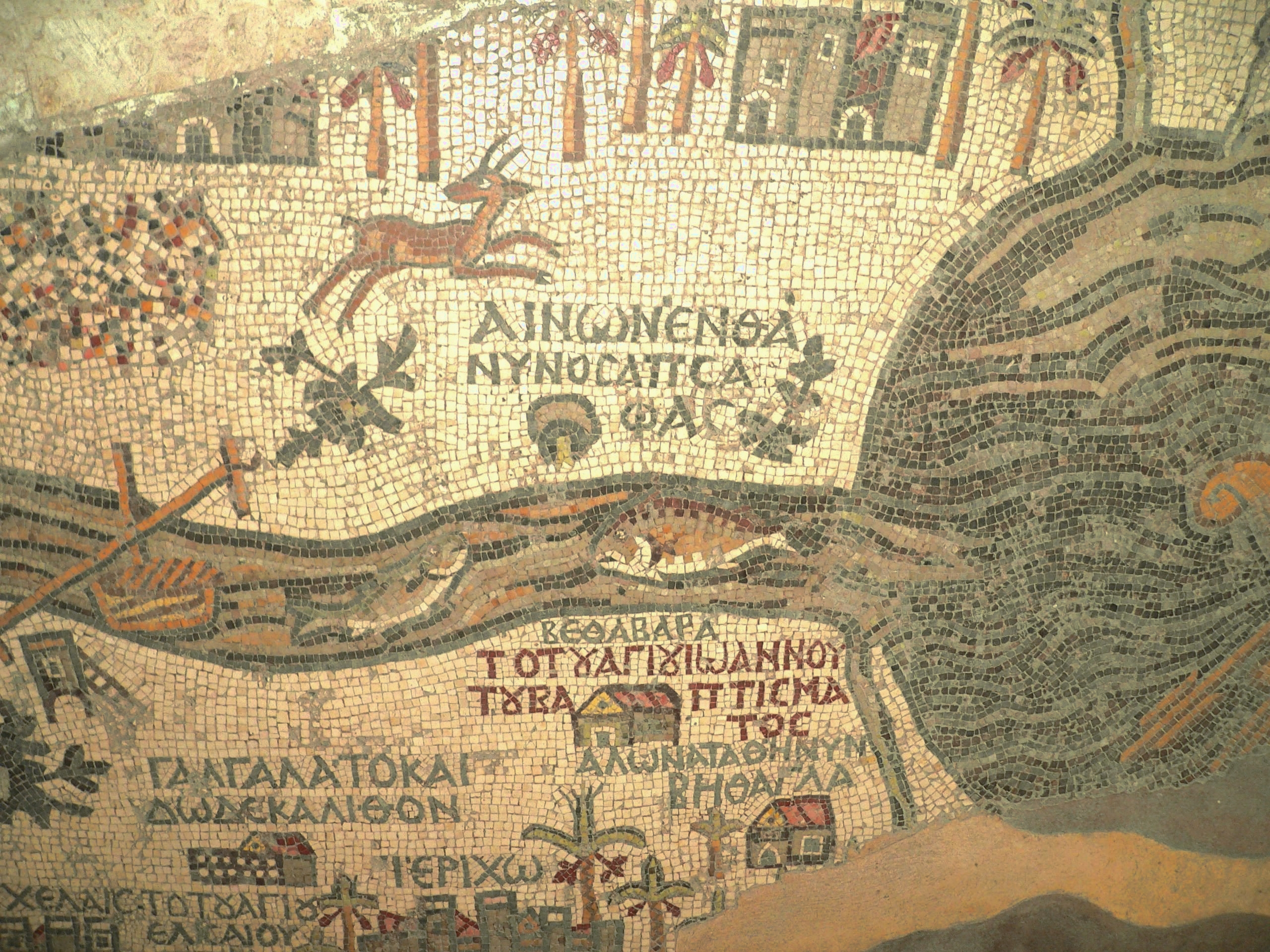
Madaba Map section showing Βέθαβαρά το τού άγίου Ιωάννου τού βαπτίσματος ('Bethabara, the place of St. John's baptising') to the west of the Jordan River

Origen was a 3rd-century Christian scholar from the Roman Empire. Noticing that in his time there was no place called Bethany east of the Jordan, he suggested amending the name to Bethabara, an existing place at the time. His suggestion was picked up by some, and it was used in several translations, including the King James Version.

"Bethabara" (/bɛˈθæbərə/ beth-AB-ər-ə; Hebrew: בית עברה, romanized: Bēṯ ‛Ăbārāh; Ancient Greek: Βηθαβαρά, romanized: Bēthabará; lit. 'House of the Ford' or 'Place of Crossing') is the name used by some versions of the New Testament for the site "beyond (i.e. east of) the Jordan" where John the Baptist preached and performed baptisms, where he met with a group of priests and Levites sent by the Pharisees to investigate his ministry, and where he baptised Jesus (Yeshua) (John 1:28–29). The name "Bethabara" also appears on the 6th-century Madaba Map (though west of the Jordan River) and in the Talmud. The name is used in a number of versions, including the King James Version (following the Textus Receptus and in the Geneva Bible of the New Testament) the place where John the Baptist was baptizing in John 1:28 was not called Bethany, but Bethabara.

It follows the New York and Moscow uncials, corrected forms of Ephraemi and Athos, along with uncial fragments from St Petersburg, Paris, minuscule 1, and family 13, backed up by Eusebius, Cyril, some Byzantine texts and lectionaries, and the Curetonian Old Syriac, Aramaic Peshitta, Armenian, and Georgian manuscripts, among others, ". The reading Bethabara became current owing to the advocacy of both Origen (3rd century) and John Chrysostom (4th century), and that same Bethabara is attested in both the 6th-century Madaba Map and in the Jewish Talmud.

G. A. Smith suggests in his The Historical Geography of the Holy Land (HGHL; 1915) that Bethany ('House of the Ship') and Bethabara ('House of the Ford') are names for the same place. The second place may also refer to the more northerly territory of Batanaea.

=== Al-Maghtas ===
Al-Maghtas is the Arabic word for a site of immersion, and implicitly of baptism.

== Geography ==
Al-Maghtas is located on the eastern bank of the Jordan River, 9 kilometres (5.6 mi) north of the Dead Sea and 10 km (6.2 mi) southeast of Jericho. The entire site, which is spread over an area of 533.7 hectares (5.337 km^{2}; 1,319 acres), has two distinct zones – Tell al-Kharrar, also called Jabal Mar Elias (Elijah's Hill), and the area close to the river (2 km (1.2 mi) to the west), the Zor area, where the ancient Church of Saint John the Baptist is situated.

The site is close to the ancient road between Jerusalem and Transjordan, via Jericho, across a Jordan River ford and connecting to other biblical sites such as Madaba, Mount Nebo and the King's Highway.

While the initial site of veneration was on the eastern side of the River Jordan, the focus had shifted to the western side by the 6th century. The term Al-Maghtas itself has been used historically for the area stretching over both banks of the river. The western part, also known under the name Qasr el-Yahud, has been mentioned in the UNESCO proposal, but so far has not been declared as a World Heritage Site.

In November 2015, the site became available on Google Street View.

== Religious significance ==
=== Israelites' crossing of the Jordan ===
According to the Hebrew Bible, Joshua instructed the Israelites how to cross the Jordan by following the priests who were carrying the Ark of the Covenant through the river, thus making its waters stop their flow (Joshua 3, mainly Joshua 3:14–17). Ancient traditions identified Al-Maghtas, known in antiquity as bet-'abarah or Bethabara, "House of the Crossing" (see Madaba Map), as the place where the people of Israel and later Prophet Elijah crossed the Jordan River and entered the Promised Land.

=== Prophet Elijah ===
The Hebrew Bible also described how Prophet Elijah, accompanied by Prophet Elisha, stopped the waters of the Jordan, crossing to the eastern side, and then went up by a whirlwind into the heavens. Elisha, now his heir, again separated the waters and crossed back (2 Kings 2:8–14). An ancient Jewish tradition identified the site of crossing with the same one used by Joshua, thus with Al-Maghtas, and the site of Elijah's ascension with Tell el-Kharrar, also known as Jabal Mar Elias, "Hill of Prophet Elijah".

=== Baptism of Jesus ===
John probably baptised in springs and brooks at least as much as he did in the more dangerous Jordan River. The concrete example is "Aenon near Salim" of John 3:23, where "aenon" stands for spring. At Al-Maghtas there is a short brook, Wadi al-Kharrar, which flows to the Jordan, and is associated with the baptism activities of John.

==== Historicity ====
The Washington Post states, "There is no archaeological evidence of Jesus ever having been baptized in these waters"; however, the Jordanian, eastern side of the traditional baptism area of Al-Maghtas has been accepted by various Christian denominations as the authentic site of the baptism of Jesus. ICOMOS in its consideration of "Bethany Beyond the Jordan" as a UNESCO World Heritage Site notes that sites historically associated with Jesus' baptism also exist on the west bank across the river as well and puts forth that their investigation into the Al-Maghtas site for recognition as a World Heritage Center does not prove without doubt that the archaeological structures there actually relate historically to Jesus' baptism and further notes that other sites along the Jordan River have historically made similar claims. The Baptism Site's official website shows 13 authentication testimonials from representatives of major international denominations.

== History and archaeology ==
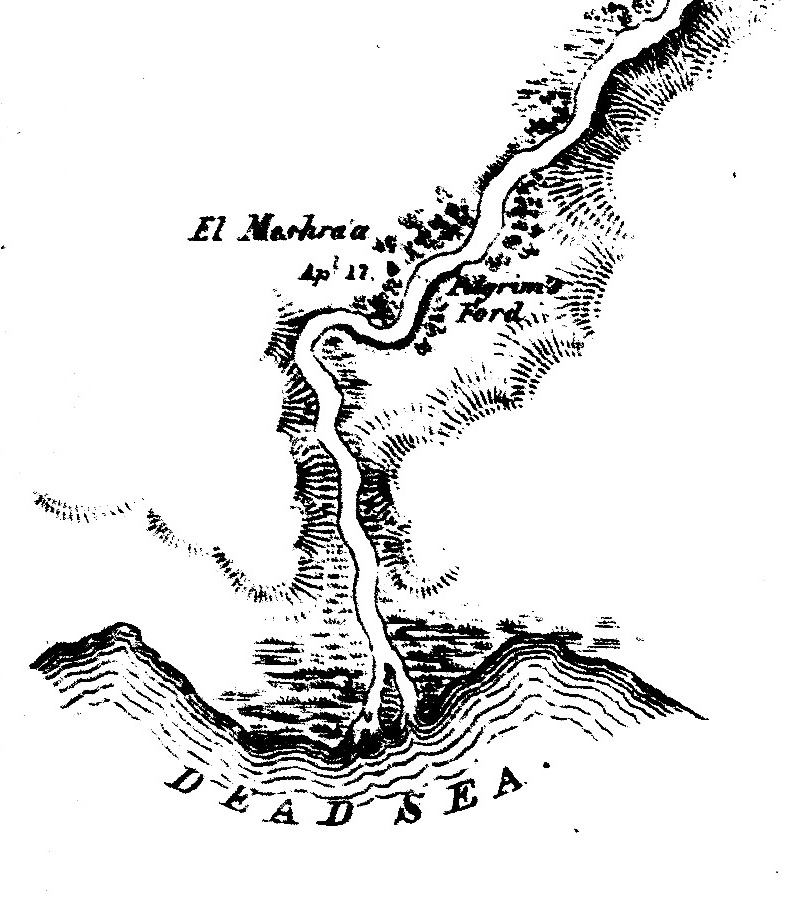
Al Maghtas in the 1849 Lynch Map of the Jordan River (cropped)

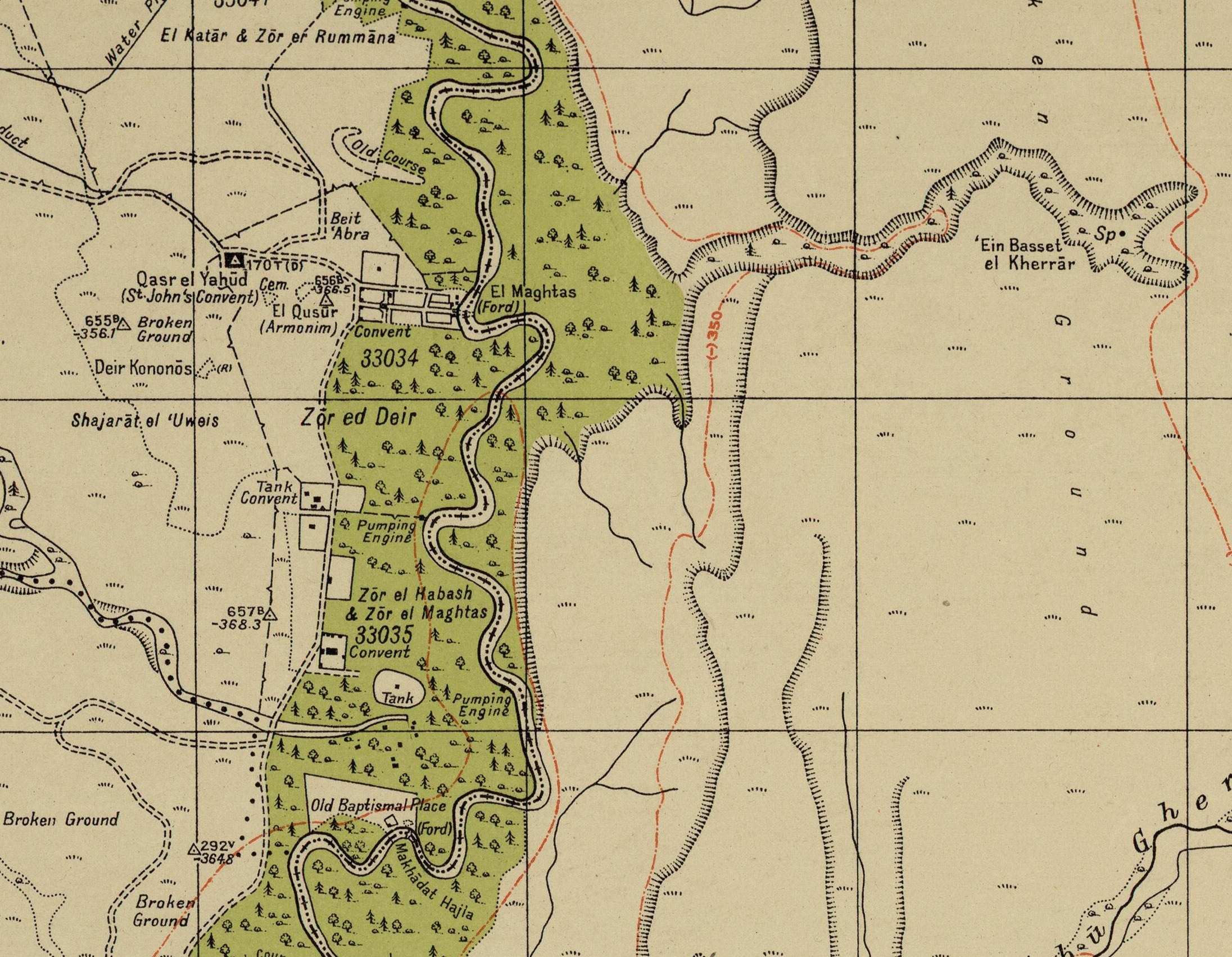
Al Maghtas on the 1944 Survey of Palestine map

=== Pre-Roman settlement ===
The archaeological excavations have unearthed antiquities which attest to the conclusion that this site was first settled by a small group of agriculturists during the Chalcolithic period, around 3500 BC. There are again signs of settlement from the Hellenistic period.

=== Roman and Byzantine periods ===
The site contains buildings with both aspects of a Jewish mikveh (ritual bath) resembling Second Temple period pools from Qumran, and later of Christian use, with large pools for baptism, linking both customs.

Possibly in the 2nd–3rd and certainly starting with the 5th–6th centuries, Christian religious structures were built at Tell al-Kharrar. It must be remembered that in the 1st-4th centuries of the Christian Era, Christianity was often persecuted by the Roman state, and only after it became first tolerated and then outright the state religion of the Roman, or now so-called Byzantine Empire, open Christian worship became possible.

Archaeological excavations also established that the hill of Tell al-Kharrar, known as Elijah's Hill, was venerated as the spot from which Prophet Elijah ascended to heaven. In the 5th century, in commemoration, a Byzantine monastery was erected here. The archaeologists have named it the "Monastery of Rhetorios" after a name from a Byzantine mosaic inscription.

The Byzantine emperor Anastasius I Dicorus erected between 491 and 518 a first church dedicated to John the Baptist on the eastern banks of the River Jordan. However, due to two flood and earthquake events the church was destroyed. The church was reconstructed three times, until it crumbled, together with the chapel built over piers, during a major flood event in the 6th or 7th century.

The pilgrimage sites have shifted throughout history. The main Christian archaeological finds from the Byzantine and possibly even Roman period indicated that the initial venerated pilgrimage site was on the east bank, but by the beginning of the 6th century the focus had moved onto the more accessible west bank of the river.

During the Byzantine period, the site was a popular pilgrimage centre. The Sasanian conquest of Jerusalem in 614, river floodings, earthquakes and the Muslim capture of Jerusalem in 637 put an end to Byzantine building activity on the east bank of the Jordan, particularly in the Wadi al-Kharrar area.

=== Early Muslim period ===
The Muslim conquest put an end to Byzantine building activity on the east bank of the Jordan River, but several of the Byzantine structures remained in use during the Early Islamic period. With time worship took place just across the river on the western side at Qasr el-Yahud. After 670 AD the commemoration of the baptism site moved to the western side.

=== Mamluk and Ottoman periods ===
The structures were rebuilt many times but were finally deserted by end of the 15th century.

In the 13th century an Orthodox monastery was built over remnants of an earlier Byzantine predecessor, but how long it lasted is not known. However, pilgrimage to the site declined and according to one pilgrim, the site was in ruins in 1484. From the 15th to the 19th century there were hardly any visits by pilgrims to the site. A small chapel dedicated to St. Mary of Egypt, a hermit from the Byzantine period, was built during the 19th century and was also destroyed in the 1927 earthquake.

In the early part of the 20th century, a farming community had occupied the area east of the Jordan River.

=== Rediscovery after 1994 and tourism ===
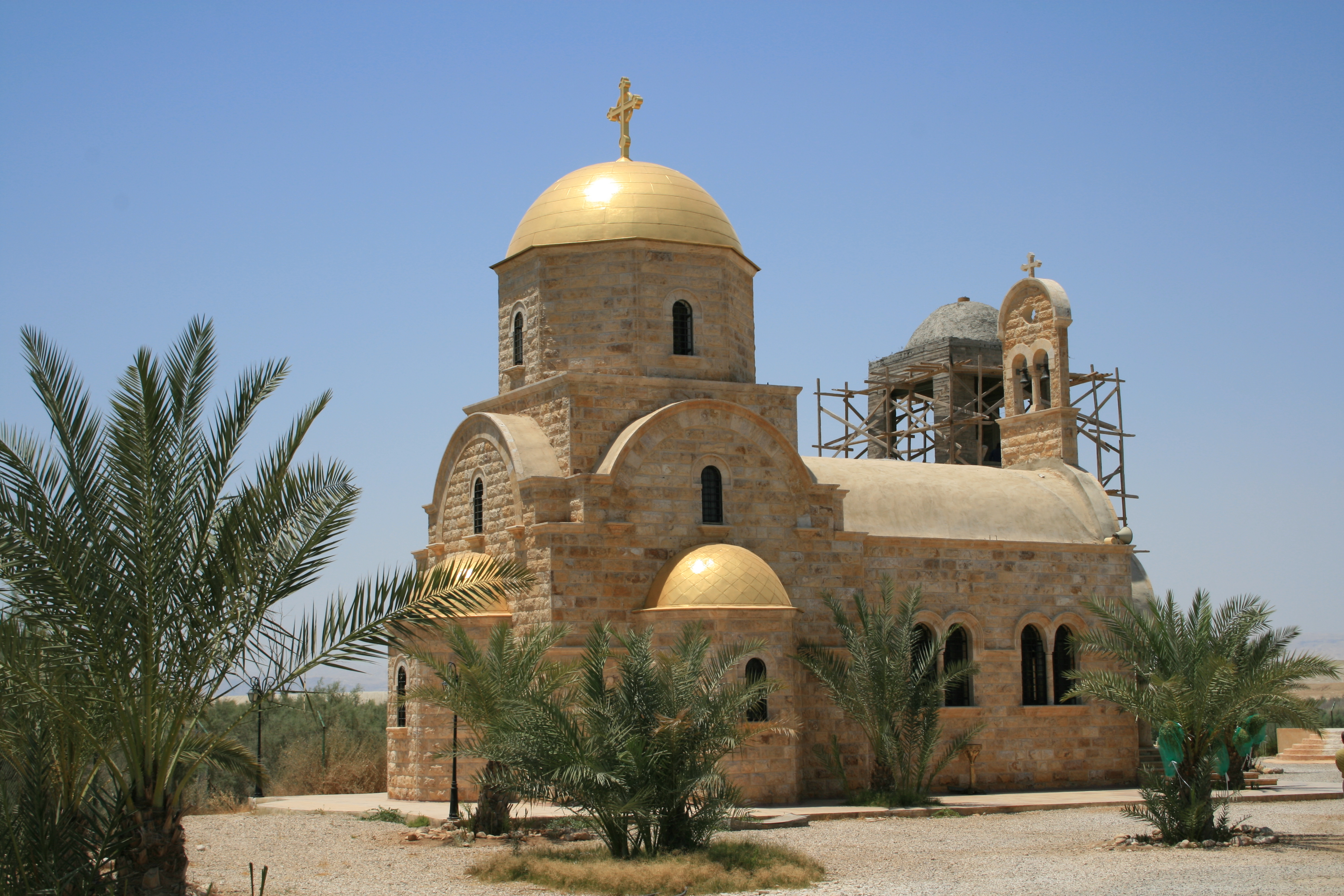
The newly built Greek Orthodox Church of John the Baptist

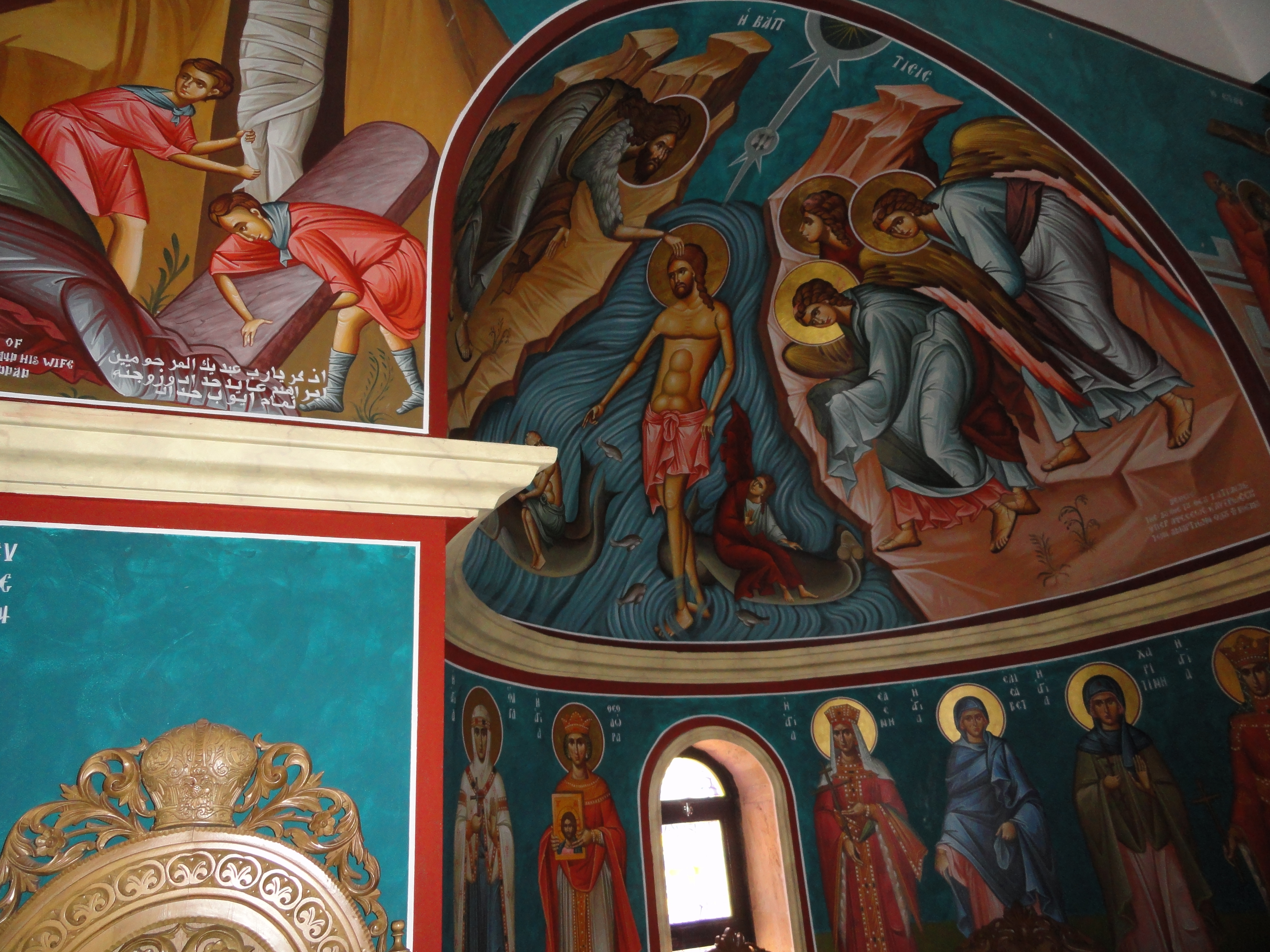
Mural inside the new Greek Orthodox church: the baptism of Jesus

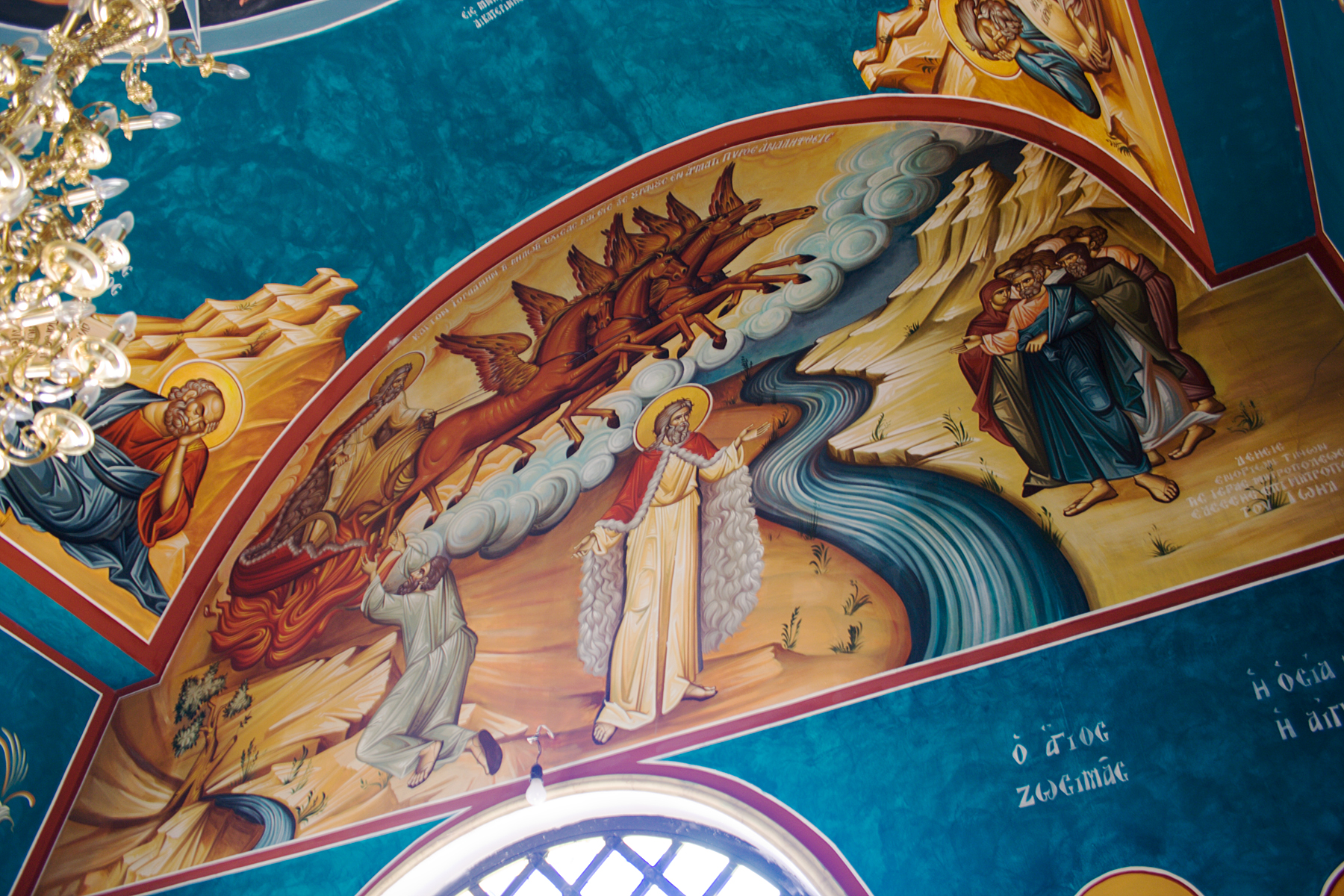
Mural inside the new Greek Orthodox church: Elijah's fiery ascent into heaven

As a result of the Six-Day War in 1967, the river became the ceasefire line and both banks became militarised and inaccessible to pilgrims. After 1982, while Qasr el-Yahud was still off-limits, Israel enabled Christian baptisms at the Yardenit site further north. Following the Israel–Jordan peace treaty in 1994 access to Al-Maghtas was restored after Prince Ghazi of Jordan, who is deeply interested in religious history, visited the area in the company of a Franciscan archaeologist who had convinced him to take a look at what was thought to be the baptism site. When they found evidence of Roman-period habitation, this was enough to encourage de-mining and further development. Soon afterwards, there were several archaeological digs led by Dr. Mohammad Waheeb who rediscovered the ancient site in 1997. The 1990s marked the period of archaeological excavations of the site followed by primary conservation and restoration measures during the early 21st century. Jordan fully reopened al-Maghtas in 2002. This was then followed by the Israeli-run western side, known as Qasr el-Yahud, which was opened for daily visits in 2011 – the traditional Epiphany celebrations had already been allowed to take place since 1985, but only at the specific Catholic and Orthodox dates and under military supervision. In 2007, a documentary film entitled The Baptism of Jesus Christ – Uncovering Bethany Beyond the Jordan was made about the site.

The western side attracts larger tourist interest than its Jordanian counterpart, with half a million visitors compared to some ten thousand on the Jordanian side. Other estimates put the numbers as 300,000 on the Israeli side and 100,000 on the Jordanian side. To put that into perspective, Yardenit has more than 400,000 visitors per year.

In the millennium year 2000, John Paul II was the first pope to visit the site. His two successors, popes Benedict XVI and Pope Francis, also visited the site, as have a number of heads of state and other dignitaries. In 2002, Christians commemorated the baptism of Christ at the site for the first time since its rediscovery. Since then, thousands of Christian pilgrims from around the world annually have marked Epiphany at Bethany Beyond the Jordan. Also in 2002, the Baptism Site opened for daily visits, attracting a constant influx of tourists and pilgrimage activity. In 2015, the UNESCO declared the Al-Maghtas site in Jordan, on the east bank of the River Jordan, as a World Heritage Site, while Qasr el-Yahud was left out.

The Museum of Jesus' Baptism is planned to be built at Al-Maghtas by 2030 as part of the Jordanian governments attempt to attract 1 million Christian tourists to the area for the bimillenary of the baptism of Jesus.

== Features ==
Archaeological excavations at the site of the 1990s have revealed religious edifices of the Roman and Byzantine periods which include "churches and chapels, a monastery, caves used by hermits and pools", which were venues of baptisms. The excavations have been supported by institutions from various countries, such as the US and Finland, and by the German Protestant Institute.

=== Tell el-Kharrar or Elijah's Hill and the baptismal pools ===
The digs unearthed three churches, three baptismal pools, a circular well and an external compound encircling the hill. The existence of water supply sourced from springs and conveyed to the baptism sites through ceramic pipes was revealed; this facility is available even now.

=== Bankside area (Zor) ===
Stone steps leading down to the pool at the traditional baptism site

In the Zor area of the site, the finds uncovered a church with a hall with columns, a basilica church known as the Church of St. John the Baptist, and the Lower Basilica Church with marble floors having geometrical designs. Also exposed were the Upper Basilica Church, the marble steps, the four piers of the Chapel of the Mantle, the Small Chapel, the Laura of St. Mary of Egypt, and a large pool. The stairway of marble steps was built in 570 AD. Twenty-two of the steps are made of black marble. The stairway leads to the Upper Basilica and a baptismal pool. This pool had once four piers that supported the Chapel of the Mantle.

=== Hermitages ===
The Quattara hills revealed a number of monk caves, also known as hermit cells, which are 300 metres (980 ft) away from the Jordan River. When the caves were in use access was through a rope way or by stairway or ladders from the western and south-western sides, but none of these are seen now. Each of these caves was carved with a semicircular niche on its eastern wall. Each cave has two chambers, one for prayer and another a living space for the monks.

=== Tombs ===
Tombs unearthed in and outside the churches are believed to be of monks of the churches. These tombs are of the Byzantine and early Islamic periods (5th–7th centuries). Numismatics finds of coins and ceramics at the site are epigraphic proofs of the site's history.

== UNESCO involvement ==
In 1994, UNESCO sponsored archaeological excavations in the area. Initially UNESCO had listed the site in the tentative list on 18 June 2001 and a new nomination was presented on 27 January 2014. ICOMOS evaluated the report presented by Jordan from 21 to 25 September 2014. The finds are closely associated with the commemoration of the baptism. Following this evaluation, the site was inscribed by UNESCO as a World Heritage Site under the title "Bethany Beyond the Jordan (Al-Maghtas)". It was inscribed as a cultural property under UNESCO Criteria (iii) and (vi). The Palestinian Tourist agency deplores the UNESCO's decision to leave out the western baptismal site. During the negotiations of the UNESCO listings, the original proposal to UNESCO stated the will to expand the site in the future in cooperation with "the neighboring country".

== Site management ==
The Baptism Site is operated by the Baptism Site Commission, an independent board of trustees appointed by King Abdullah II. In 2017, the Commission reported that approximately 81,000 people visited the site in 2016, a 23% increase from 2015, by mostly European, American, and Arab tourists.

== See also ==
- Ænon, a baptism site mentioned in the Gospel of John
- Baptism of Jesus
- Chronology of Jesus
- List of Christian pilgrimage sites
- List of World Heritage Sites in Jordan
- Mandaeism
- Masbuta
- Ministry of Jesus
- New Testament places associated with Jesus
- Qasr al-Yahud, the West Bank side of al-Maghtas

== Bibliography ==
- Alliata, Eugenio; de Luca, Stefano (2000). "Jordan: The Madaba Mosaic Map (VI century A.D.)". Jerusalem: Studium Biblicum Franciscanum (SBF), posted at Franciscan Cyberspot. Archived from the original on 2016-04-14. It is an expanded version of the book:

Piccirillo, Michele; Alliata, Eugenio (1999). The Madaba Map Centenary 1897-1997. Travelling through the Byzantine Umayyad Period. Proceedings of the International Conference Held in Amman, 7-9 April 1997. Collectio Maior. Vol. 40. Jerusalem: Franciscan Printing Press.

  - Alliata, Eugenio (1999). The Pilgrimage Route During Byzantine Period in Transjordan. p. 122. Archived from the original on 23 October 2015. "... the construction of a new church on the more accessible west bank of the river succeeded in attracting the toponym as it appears also in the Madaba map. The new church of the "Prodromos" was built by the Emperor Anastasius (AD 491–518) as the pilgrim and archdeacon Theodosius [518–530] reports. Starting from the 6th century a major festival took place there on the feast of Epiphany (January 6). It is well described by the pilgrim of Piacenza [570s] and, without a doubt, many people also from the eastern side of the Jordan took part in this annual event."
  - Piccirillo, Michele (1999). Aenon, where now is Sapsaphas - (Wadi Kharrar). pp. 219–220. Archived from the original on 25 December 2003. "In 1106 Abbot Daniel a Russian pilgrim was well impressed by the place.... The place was later abandoned for security reasons. However, the memory of the place was not lost;.... in the year 1400 AD...."
