= Bimillenary of the baptism of Jesus =

Planned Christian pilgrimage to Jordan

A series of celebrations and observances are planned in 2030 for the bimillenary (2,000th anniversary) of the baptism of Jesus, which is traditionally held to have occurred in AD 30 in what is now Al-Maghtas, Jordan.

In 2022, the government of Jordan announced plans to celebrate the bimillenary in 2030. The government of Israel began preparations for the bimillenary in 2026.

== Jordan ==
Jesus—the central figure in Christianity—was baptized at what is now Al-Maghtas, Jordan. The event is traditionally dated to AD 30. The place is a Unesco World Heritage site, featuring Roman and Byzantine churches, a monastery, and baptism pools.

In December 2022, King Abdullah II of Jordan unveiled the masterplan for a new 340-acre baptism zone adjacent to the UNESCO-listed site of Al-Maghtas. The masterplan included a $100 million development programme intended to attract one million Christian pilgrims to the site in 2030, when Jordan plans to commemorate the 2,000th anniversary of Jesus' baptism. The project promises a biblical village and the Middle East's largest Christian pilgrimage and interfaith centre.

In 2026, King Abdullah inaugurated Jordan's first Christian university, the Baptism Site International Orthodox University, at Al-Maghtas. That year, the National Committee for the Preparation of the Celebration of the Second Millennium of the Baptism of Jesus Christ was established as the country's principal body responsible for planning and overseeing the 2030 commemoration. It held its first meeting on 10 August, chaired by Prime Minister Jafar Hassan. The committee comprises government ministers, religious and community leaders, and representatives of relevant institutions. The bimillenary celebrations are set to last a year, and the government hopes to draw a million Christians to Jordan.

== Israel ==
In 2026, the Israeli Foreign Ministry began preparations for the 2030 commemoration. Foreign Minister Gideon Sa'ar appointed George Deek, Israel's special envoy to the Christian world, to lead a dedicated working group to coordinate the preparations. The initiative followed a period of heightened tensions and several controversies affecting Israel's relations with Christian communities. These included blocking the Latin patriarch of Jerusalem, Cardinal Pierbattista Pizzaballa, from the Church of the Holy Sepulchre during the Holy Week observances; the desecration of Christian statues in Debel by the Israel Defense Forces; Israeli settler violence directed at Christian communities in the West Bank; and assaults on Christian clergy in Jerusalem.
