= Baptism of Jesus =

Event in the life of Jesus

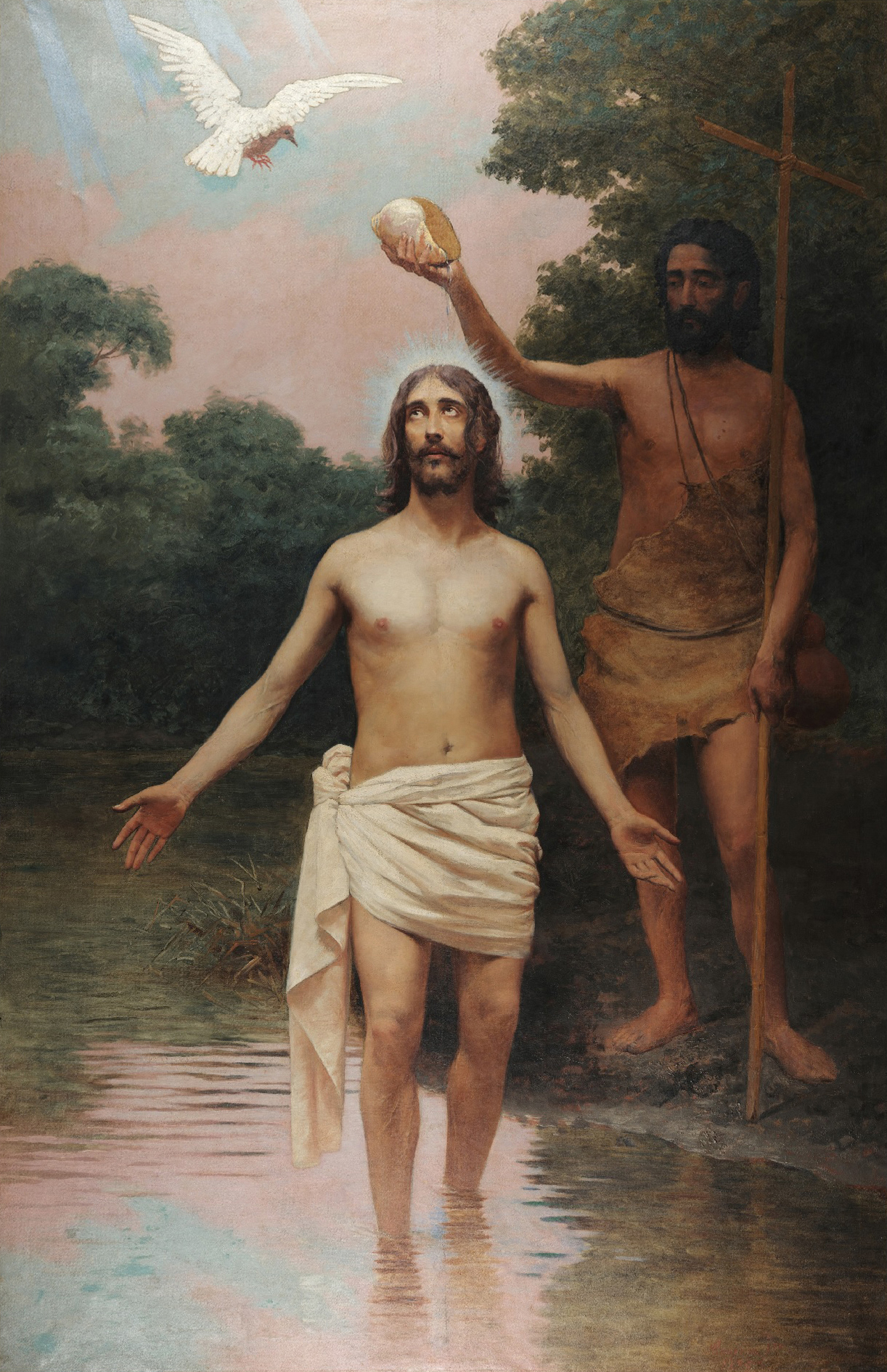
- The Baptism of Christ by John the Baptist, by Almeida Júnior, 1895
- Date: Early 1st century AD (most likely in c. AD 28/29)
- Location: Present-day Al-Maghtas, Jordan
- Participants: Jesus, John the Baptist

The baptism of Jesus with water by John the Baptist is described in the three synoptic Gospels of the New Testament (Matthew, Mark, and Luke). (Note: The Gospel of John does not directly describe Jesus' baptism.) It is considered to have taken place at Al-Maghtas (also called Bethany Beyond the Jordan), today located in Jordan.

Modern biblical scholars view the baptism of Jesus as a historical event to which a high degree of certainty can be assigned. Along with the crucifixion of Jesus, biblical scholars view it as one of the two historically certain facts about him, and often use it as the starting point for the study of the historical Jesus.

The baptism is one of the events in the narrative of the life of Jesus in the canonical Gospels; others include the Transfiguration, Crucifixion, Resurrection, and Ascension. Most Christian denominations view the baptism of Jesus as an important event and a basis for the Christian rite of baptism (see also Acts 19:1–7). In Eastern Christianity, Jesus's baptism is commemorated on 6 January (the Julian calendar date of which corresponds to 19 January on the Gregorian calendar), the feast of Epiphany, also referred in some Churches as the Feast of Theophany. In the Roman Catholic Church, the Anglican Communion, the Lutheran Churches and some other Western denominations, it is recalled on a day within the following week, the feast of the baptism of the Lord. In Roman Catholicism, the baptism of Jesus is one of the Luminous Mysteries sometimes added to the Rosary. It is a Trinitarian feast in the Eastern Orthodox Churches.

== In the Synoptic Gospels ==
Mark, Matthew, and Luke depict the baptism in parallel passages. In all three gospels, the Spirit of God — the Holy Spirit in Luke, "the Spirit" in Mark, and "the Spirit of God" in Matthew — is depicted as descending upon Jesus immediately after his baptism accompanied by a voice from Heaven, but the accounts of Luke and Mark record the voice as addressing Jesus by saying "You are my beloved Son, in whom I am well pleased", while in Matthew the voice states "This is my beloved Son, in whom I am well pleased" (Matthew 3:13–17; Mark 1:9–11; Luke 3:21–23).

After the baptism, the Synoptic gospels describe the temptation of Jesus, where Jesus withdrew to the Judean desert to fast for forty days and nights.

=== Matthew ===
Matthew's account is unique in several respects: He asserts that Jesus left Galilee for the purpose of being baptized by John (πρὸς τὸν Ἰωάννην τοῦ βαπτισθῆναι ὑπ’ αὐτοῦ). He includes a conversation between John and Jesus: In v. 14, John said: "I need to be baptized by you, and do you come to me?" Nevertheless, Jesus convinces John to baptize him "to fulfill all righteousness" (v. 15). Matthew records that the voice from heaven says "This is my beloved Son, in whom I am well pleased", but does not indicate who is addressed.

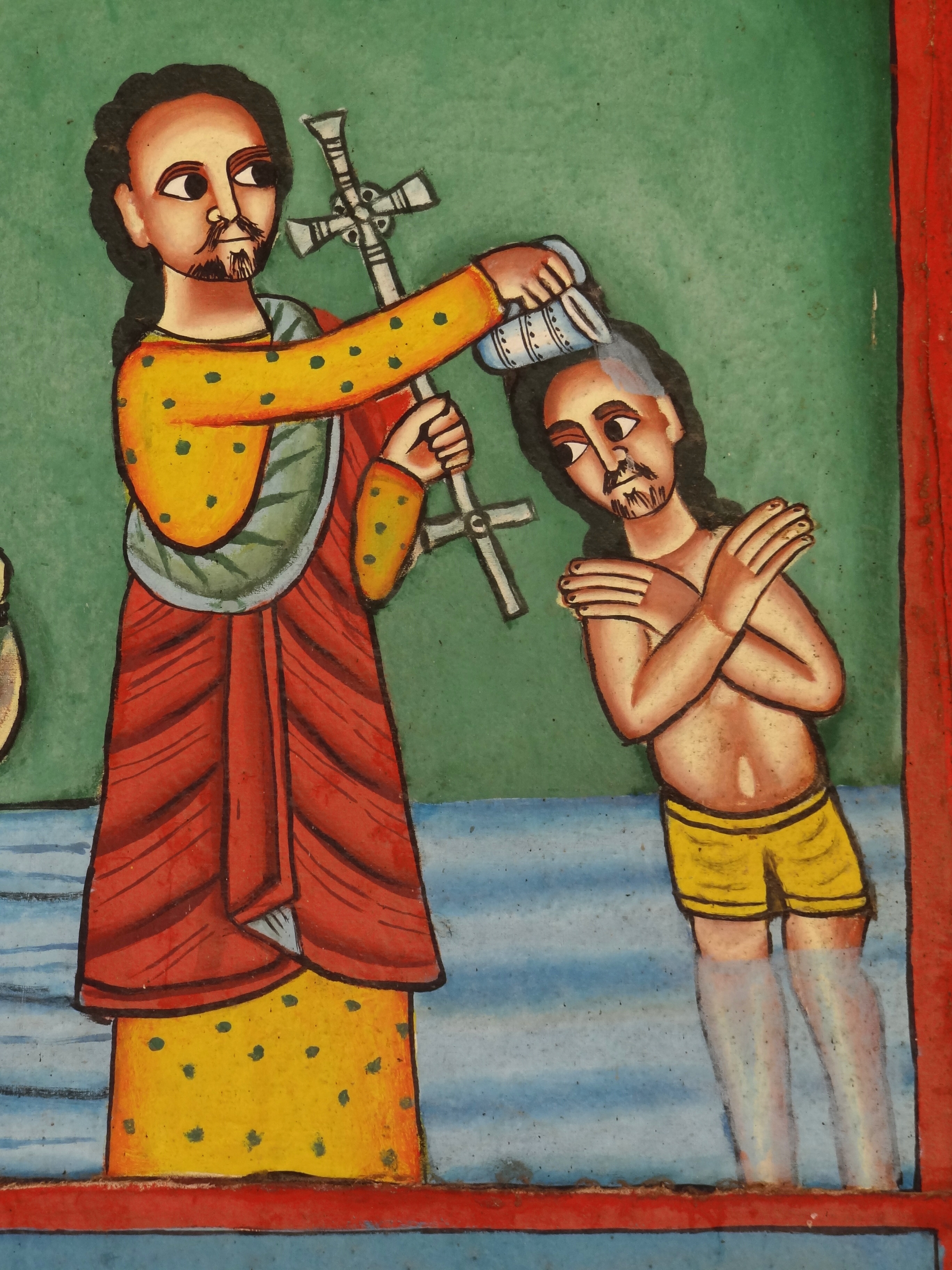
Depiction of the Baptism of Jesus in Axum, Ethiopia

=== Mark ===
Mark's account is roughly parallel to that of Matthew, except for Matthew 3:14–15, which describes John's initial reluctance and eventual consent to baptize Jesus, which is not described by Mark. Mark uses an unusual word for the opening of the heavens, σχιζομένους, schizomenous, which means "tearing" or "ripping" (Mark 1:10). It forms a verbal thread (Leitwortstil) with the rending (ἐσχίσθη, eschisthē) of the Temple veil in Mark 15:38, inviting comparison between the two episodes.

=== Luke ===
Luke 1 begins with the birth of John the Baptist, heralded to his father, Zacharias, by the angel Gabriel. Six months later Gabriel appears to the Virgin Mary with an announcement of the birth of Jesus (the Annunciation). Gabriel also announces to Mary the coming birth of John the Baptist to her kinswoman Elizabeth, who is the wife of Zacharias. Mary immediately sets out to visit Elizabeth and stays with her until John's birth. Luke strongly contrasts the reactions of Zacharias and Mary to these two respective births; and the lives of John and Jesus are intertwined.

Luke uniquely depicts John as showing public kindness to tax collectors and encouraging the giving of alms to the poor (as in Luke 3:11). Luke records that Jesus was praying when Heaven was opened and the Holy Spirit descended on him. Luke clarifies that the spirit descended in the "bodily form" of a dove, as opposed to merely "descending like" a dove. In Acts 10:37–38, the ministry of Jesus is described as following "the baptism which John preached".

== In the Gospel of John ==
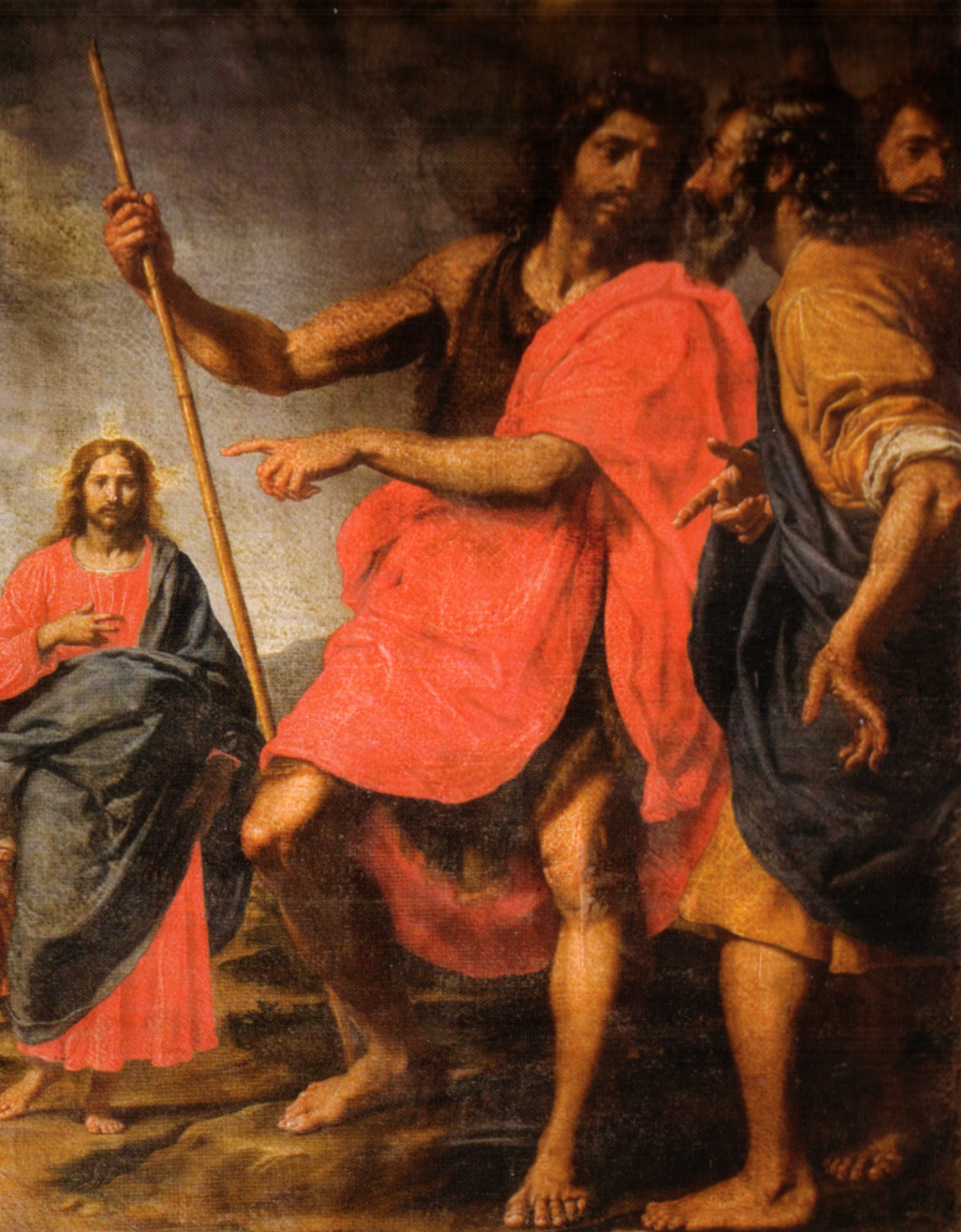
Jesus (left) is being identified by John the Baptist in John 1:29, by Ottavio Vannini, 17th century.

In John 1:29–33, rather than a direct narrative, John the Baptist bears witness to the Spirit descending like a dove.

The Gospel of John (John 1:28) specifies "Bethabara beyond Jordan", i.e., Bethany in Perea as the location where John was baptizing when Jesus began choosing disciples, and in John 3:23 there is mention of further baptisms in Ænon "because there was much water there".

John 1:35–37 narrates an encounter, between Jesus and two of his future disciples, who were then disciples of John the Baptist. The episode in John 1:35–37 forms the start of the relationship between Jesus and his future disciples. When John the Baptist called Jesus the Lamb of God, the "two disciples heard him speak, and they followed Jesus". One of the disciples is named Andrew, but the other remains unnamed, and Raymond E. Brown raises the question of his being the author of the Gospel of John himself. In the Gospel of John, the disciples follow Jesus thereafter, and bring other disciples to him, and Acts 18:24–19:6 portrays the disciples of John as eventually merging with the followers of Jesus.

== In the Gospel of the Nazarenes ==
According to the non-canonical Gospel of the Nazarenes, the idea of being baptized by John came from the mother and brothers of Jesus, and Jesus himself, originally opposed, reluctantly accepted it. Benjamin Urrutia suggests that this version is supported by the criterion of embarrassment, since followers of Jesus would not have invented an episode in which Jesus changes his mind and comes to accept someone else's plan. Plus, the story came from the community that included the family of Jesus, who would have guaranteed the authenticity of the narrative.

== Location ==
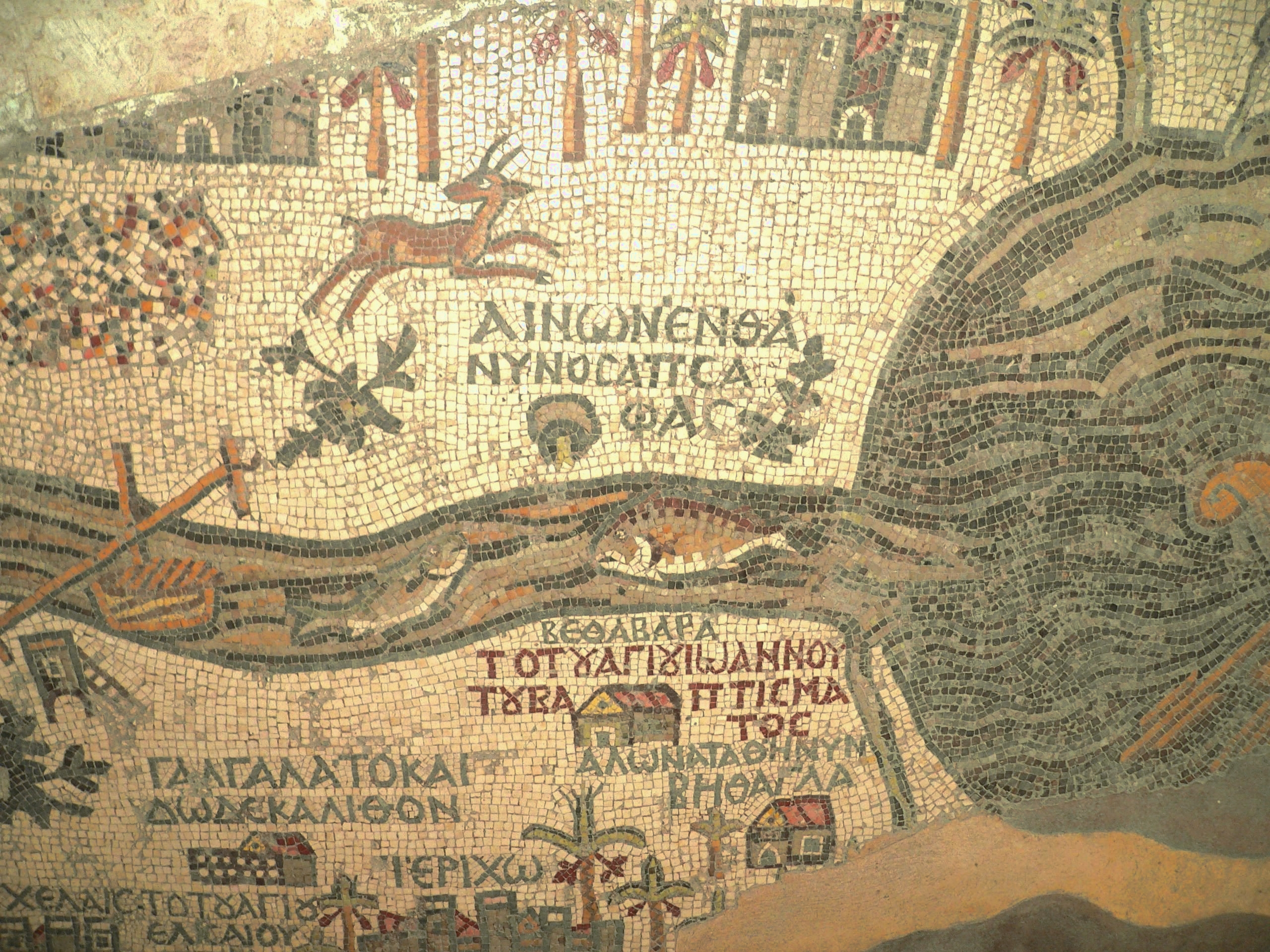
Part of the ancient Madaba Map showing Bethabara east of the Jordan River

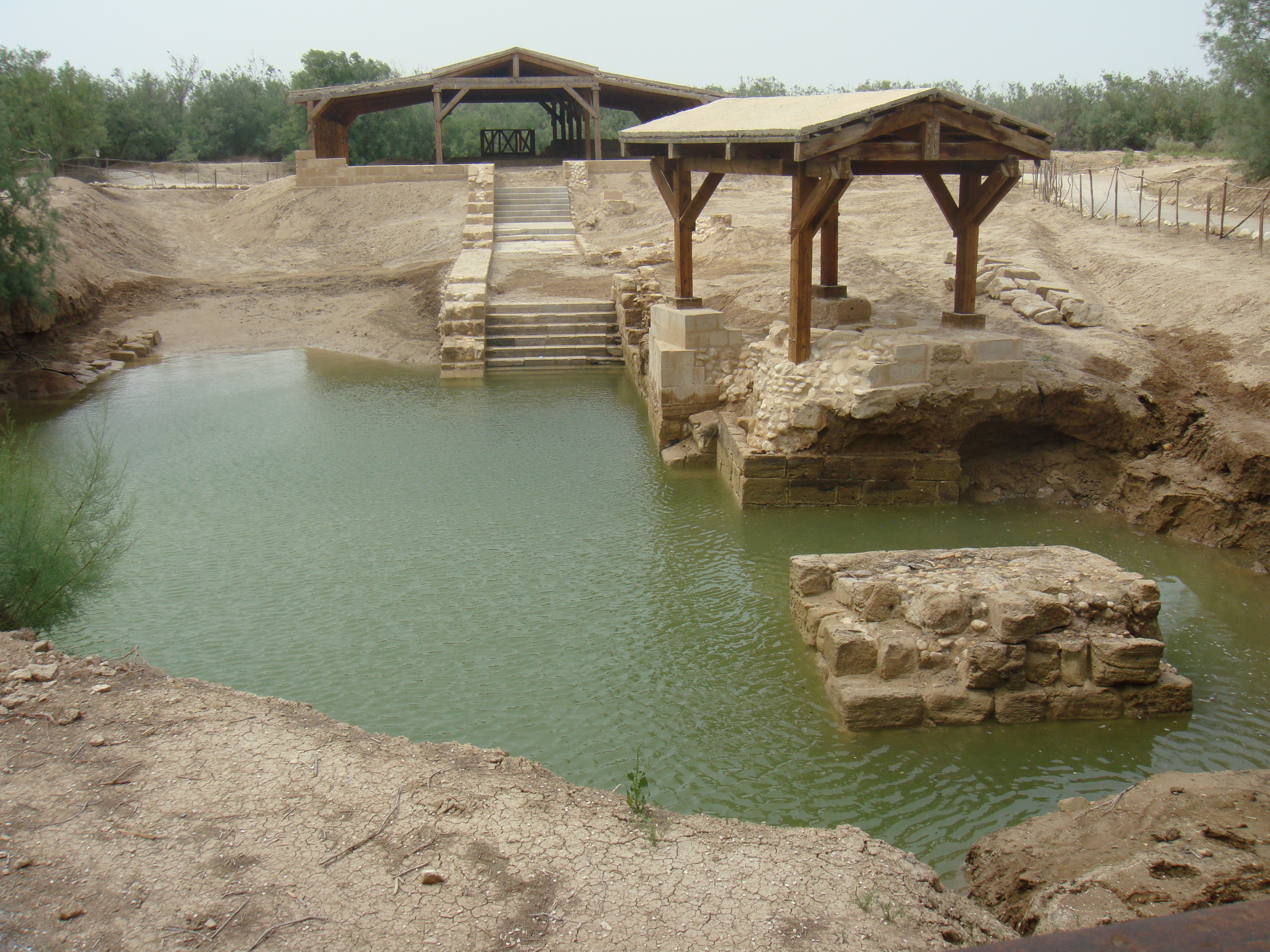
The Al-Maghtas ruins on the Jordanian side of the Jordan River were the location for the Baptism of Jesus and the ministry of John the Baptist.

The Gospel of John (John 1:28) states that John was baptising in "Bethany Beyond the Jordan", generally considered to be the town of Bethany, also called Bethabara in Perea, on the eastern bank of the Jordan river, near Jericho. In the 3rd century, Origen, who moved to the area from Alexandria, suggested Bethabara as the location. In the 4th century, Eusebius of Caesarea stated that the location was on the west bank of the Jordan, and following him, the early Byzantine Madaba Map shows Bethabara as (Βέθαβαρά).

The biblical baptising is related to springs and a Wadi (al-Kharrar) close to the Eastern site of the Jordan River, not the Jordan itself. The pilgrimage sites, important for both Christians and Jews, have shifted place during history. The site of Al-Maghtas (baptism, or immersion in Arabic) on the East side of the River in Jordan has been deemed the earliest place of worship. This site was found following UNESCO-sponsored excavations. Al-Maghtas was visited by Pope John Paul II in March 2000, and he said, "In my mind I see Jesus coming to the waters of the river Jordan not far from here to be baptized by John the Baptist". The Muslim conquest put an end to the Byzantine buildings on the east bank of the Jordan River. The later reverence took place just across the river in the West Bank at Qasr el Yahud. The valley around the Dead Sea, which the Jordan River flows into from the north, is also the lowest place on planet Earth.

== Chronology ==
The baptism of Jesus is generally considered as the start of his ministry, shortly after the start of the ministry of John the Baptist. Luke 3:1–2 states that:

In the fifteenth year of the reign of Tiberius Caesar—when Pontius Pilate was governor of Judea [...] the word of God came to John son of Zechariah in the wilderness.

There are two approaches to determining when the reign of Tiberius Caesar started. The traditional approach is that of assuming that the reign of Tiberius started when he became co-regent in AD 11, placing the start of the ministry of John the Baptist around AD 26. However, some scholars assume it to be upon the death of his predecessor Augustus Caesar in AD 14, implying that the ministry of John the Baptist began in AD 29.

The generally assumed dates for the start of the ministry of John the Baptist based on this reference in the Gospel of Luke are about AD 28–29, with the baptism of Jesus and his ministry following shortly thereafter.

== Historicity ==
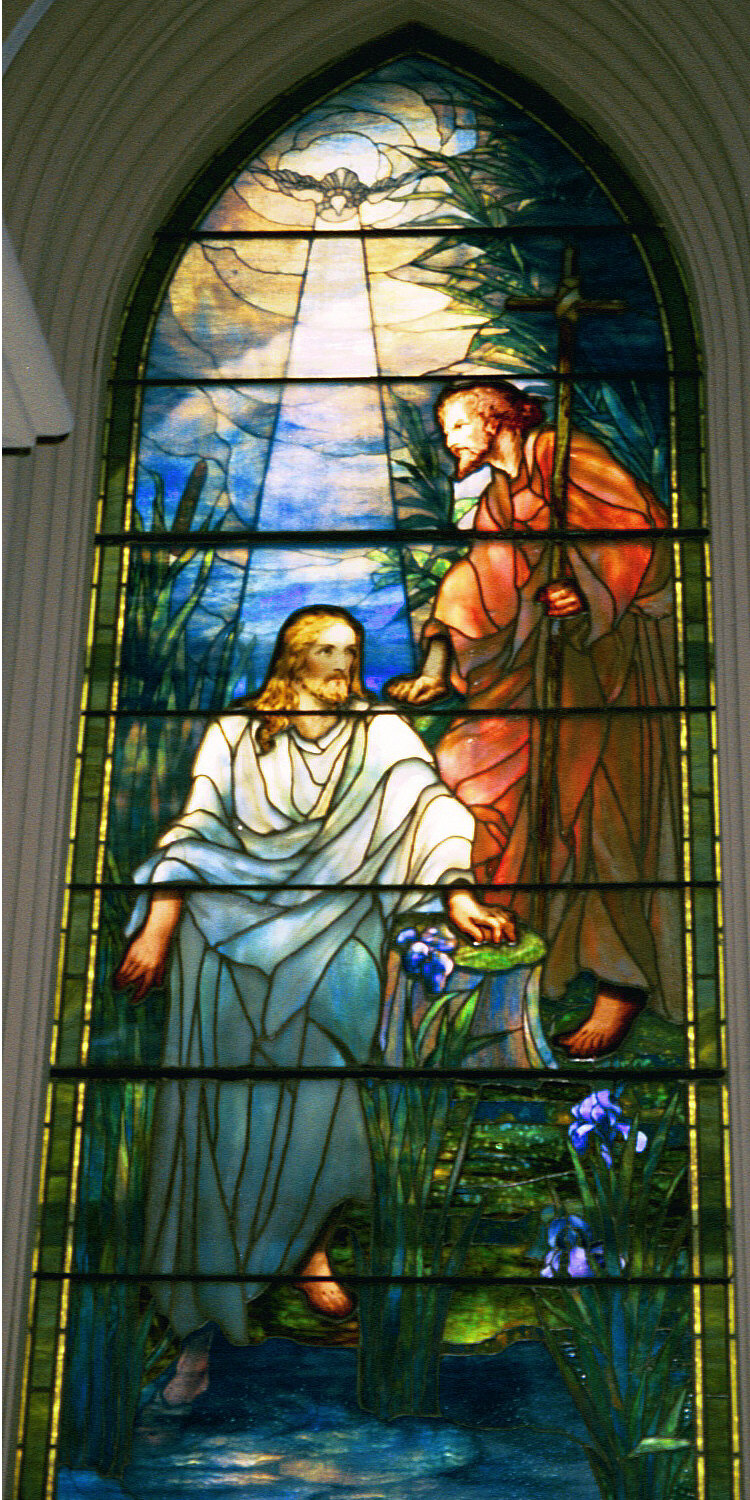
Stained glass window of Jesus's baptism by Tiffany

Nearly all scholars believe that John the Baptist performed a baptism on Jesus, and view it as a historical event to which a high degree of certainty can be assigned. James Dunn states that the historicity of the baptism and crucifixion of Jesus "command almost universal assent". Dunn states that these two facts "rank so high on the 'almost impossible to doubt or deny' scale of historical facts" that they are often the starting points for the study of the historical Jesus. John Dominic Crossan states that it is historically certain that Jesus was baptized by John in the Jordan.

In the Antiquities of the Jews (18.5.2) 1st-century historian Flavius Josephus also wrote about John the Baptist and his eventual death in Perea.

The existence of John the Baptist within the same time frame as Jesus, and his eventual execution by Herod Antipas, is attested to by 1st-century historian Flavius Josephus and the overwhelming majority of modern scholars view Josephus' accounts of the activities of John the Baptist as authentic. Josephus establishes a key connection between the historical events he recorded and specific episodes that appear in the gospels. The reference in the Antiquities of the Jews by Josephus to John's popularity among the crowds (Antiquities 18.5.2) and how he preached his baptism is considered a reliable historical datum. Unlike the gospels, Josephus does not relate John and Jesus, and does not state that John's baptisms were for the remission of sins. However, almost all modern scholars consider the Josephus passage on John to be authentic in its entirety and view the variations between Josephus and the gospels as indications that the Josephus passages are authentic, for a Christian interpolator would have made them correspond to the Christian traditions.

One of the arguments in favour of the historicity of the baptism of Jesus by John is that it is a story which the early Christian Church would have never wanted to invent, typically referred to as the criterion of embarrassment in historical analysis. Based on this criterion, given that John baptized for the remission of sins, and Jesus was viewed as without sin, the invention of this story would have served no purpose, and would have been an embarrassment given that it positioned John above Jesus. The Gospel of Matthew attempts to offset this problem by having John feel unworthy to baptize Jesus and Jesus giving him permission to do so in Matthew 3:14–15.

The gospels are not the only references to the baptisms performed by John. In Acts of the Apostles, Peter refers to how the ministry of Jesus followed "the baptism which John preached". Another argument supporting the historicity of the baptism is that multiple accounts refer to it, usually called the criterion of multiple attestation. Technically, multiple attestation does not guarantee authenticity, but only determines antiquity. However, for most scholars, together with the criterion of embarrassment it lends credibility to the baptism of Jesus by John being a historical event.

== Commentary ==
Justus Knecht answers the question of why Jesus let himself be baptized by John:

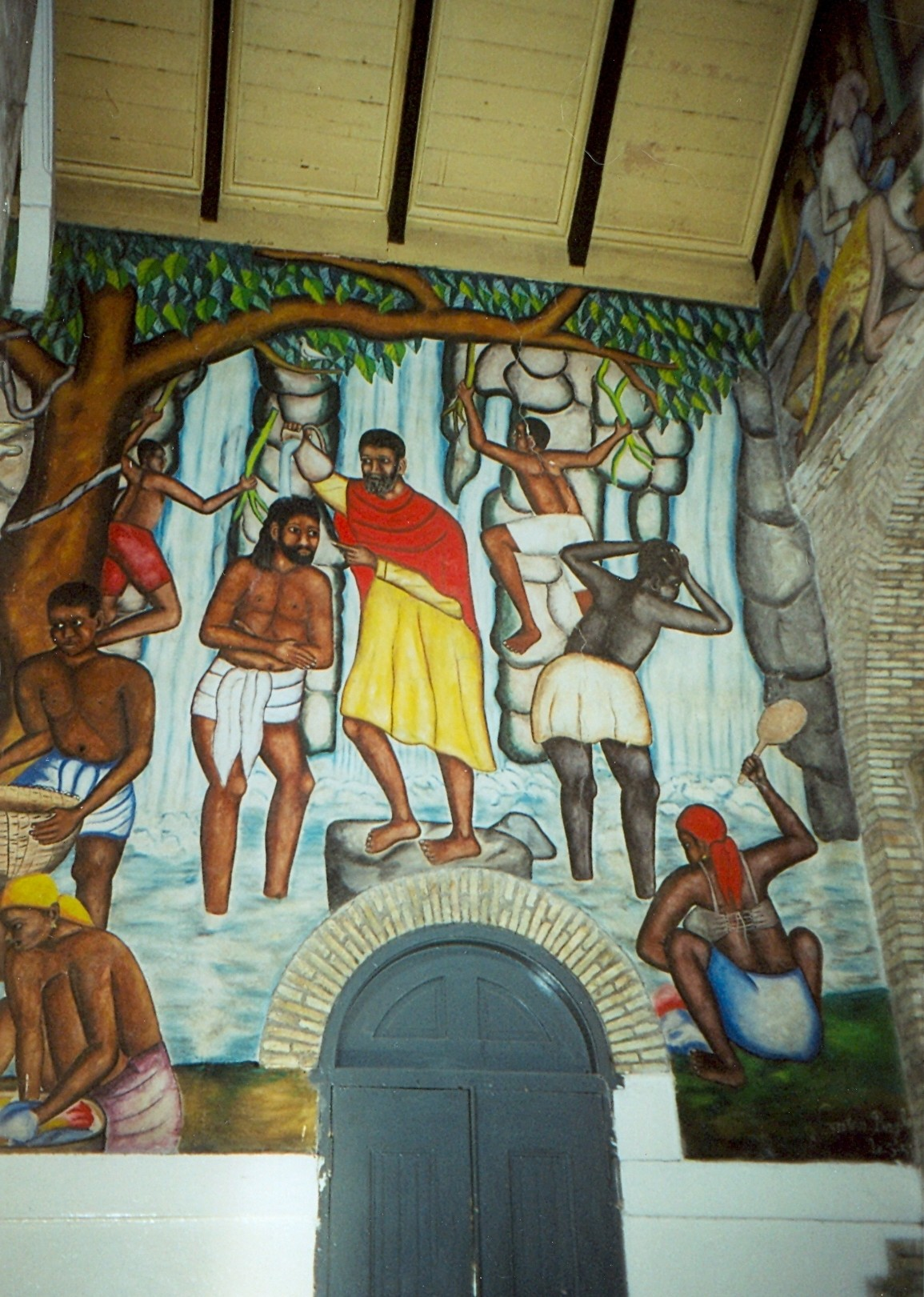
The baptism of Jesus depicted at the Cathédrale Sainte Trinité, Port-au-Prince, Haiti

1. He did not require to do penance, because He was without sin; but He had taken our sins upon Him to atone for them; therefore He humbled Himself, placed Himself on a level with sinners, and obediently subjected Himself to be baptized, as He had submitted before to be circumcised, and presented in the Temple. 2. He gave us thereby a lesson in humility and obedience, and has taught us that we too must fulfil all justice, i. e. promptly obey all the ordinances of God. 3. By His baptism He sanctified water, and gave to it the power of purifying and sanctifying the soul of man. In other words, He instituted the Sacrament of Baptism by which, under the outward sign of water, we receive remission of our sins.

He also notes that, "The opening of heaven signified that Heaven, which had been closed to man since the Fall, was now once more opened by Jesus."

Roger Baxter reflects on Christ's baptism in his Meditations:

The first act of Christ's public life was to present Himself to be baptized by His precursor, to teach us that those who are employed in the work of God should carry with them a pure and uncorrupted heart. He therefore takes leave of His divine Mother, who, although she grieved at the absence of such a Son, rejoiced that the redemption of Israel was at hand. He takes a long journey to the Baptist. The Lord goes to the servant to be baptized by him as a common sinner, among publicans and soldiers and the lowest order of the vulgar. Admire the humility of the Son of God, and convince yourself that humility is the best preparation for great works.

== Artistic depictions ==
While the gospel of Luke is explicit about the Spirit of God descending in the shape of a dove, the wording of Matthew is vague enough that it could be interpreted only to suggest that the descent was in the style of a dove. Although a variety of symbolisms were attached to doves at the time these passages were written, the dove imagery has become a well known symbol for the Holy Spirit in Christian art. Depictions of the baptismal scene typically show the sky opening and the Holy Spirit descending as a dove towards Jesus.

Artists usually tried to show the whole body of Christ as he stood in the water, which could give them difficulties. The reasonably coherent 6th-century mosaic image in the Arian Baptistry, Ravenna, with the water hemmed in by two banks, when used in many generations of copies in Western Europe, by artists unskilled in depicting visual recession, led to images like that in the Psalter of Eleanor of Aquitaine, where there appears to be a standing mound of water.

At least one attendant archangel, holding Christ's robe, and often another with a towel, became usual in medieval images.

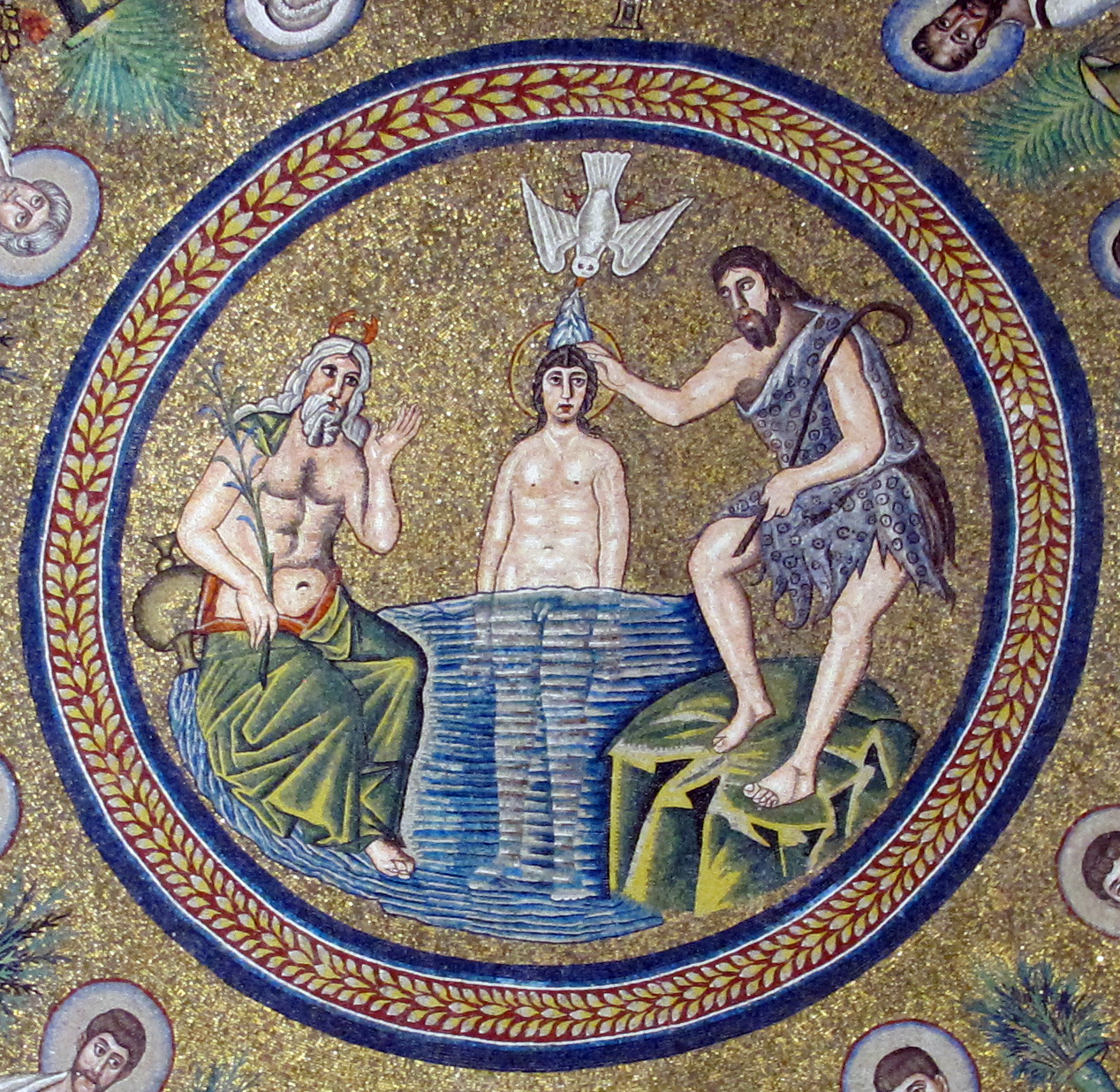
Arian Baptistry, Ravenna, 6th-century mosaic. A classical personification of the Jordan attends at left.

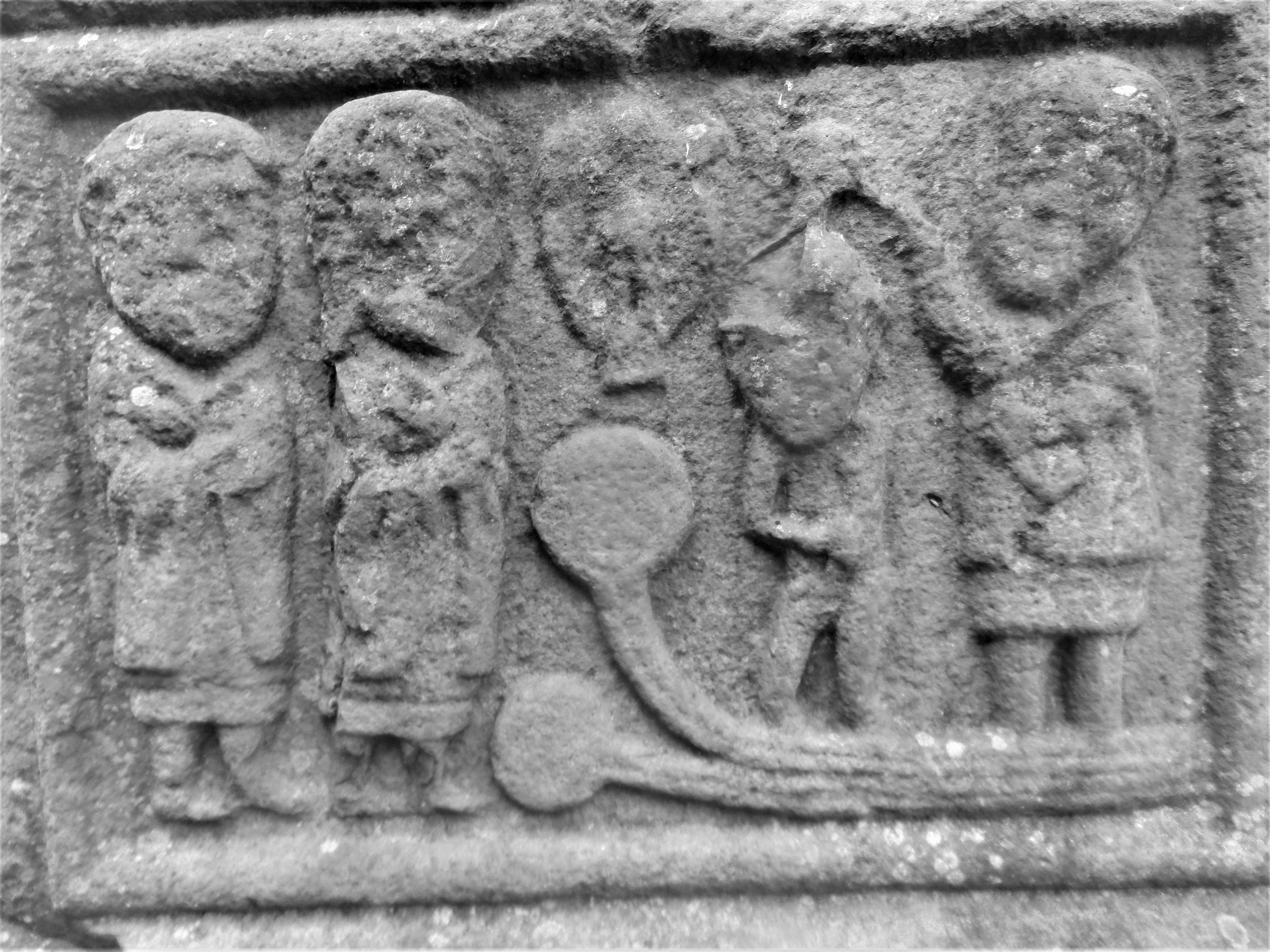
High cross, Kells, Ireland, 10th-century carving in stone

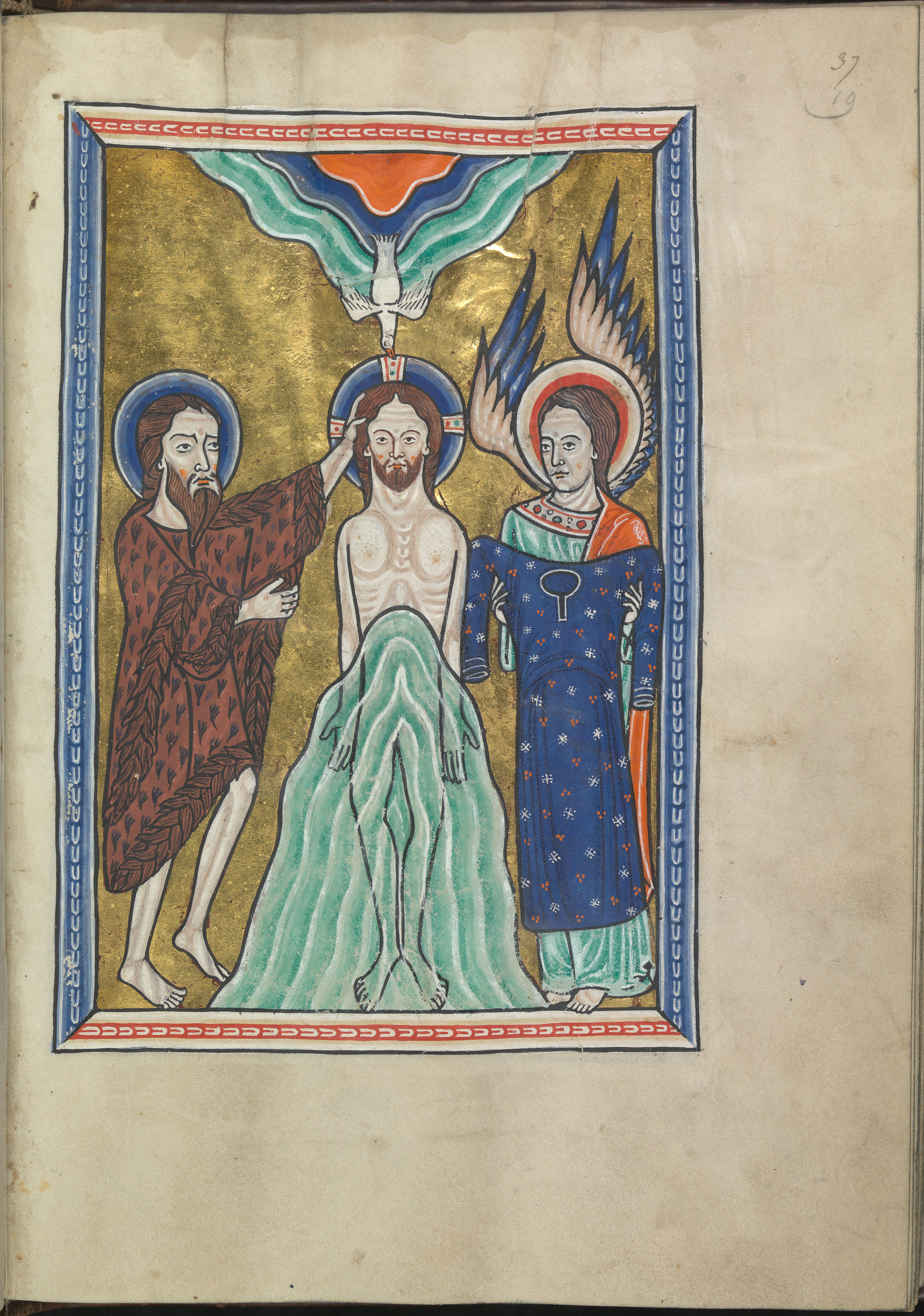
Miniature from the Psalter of Eleanor of Aquitaine (c. 1185)

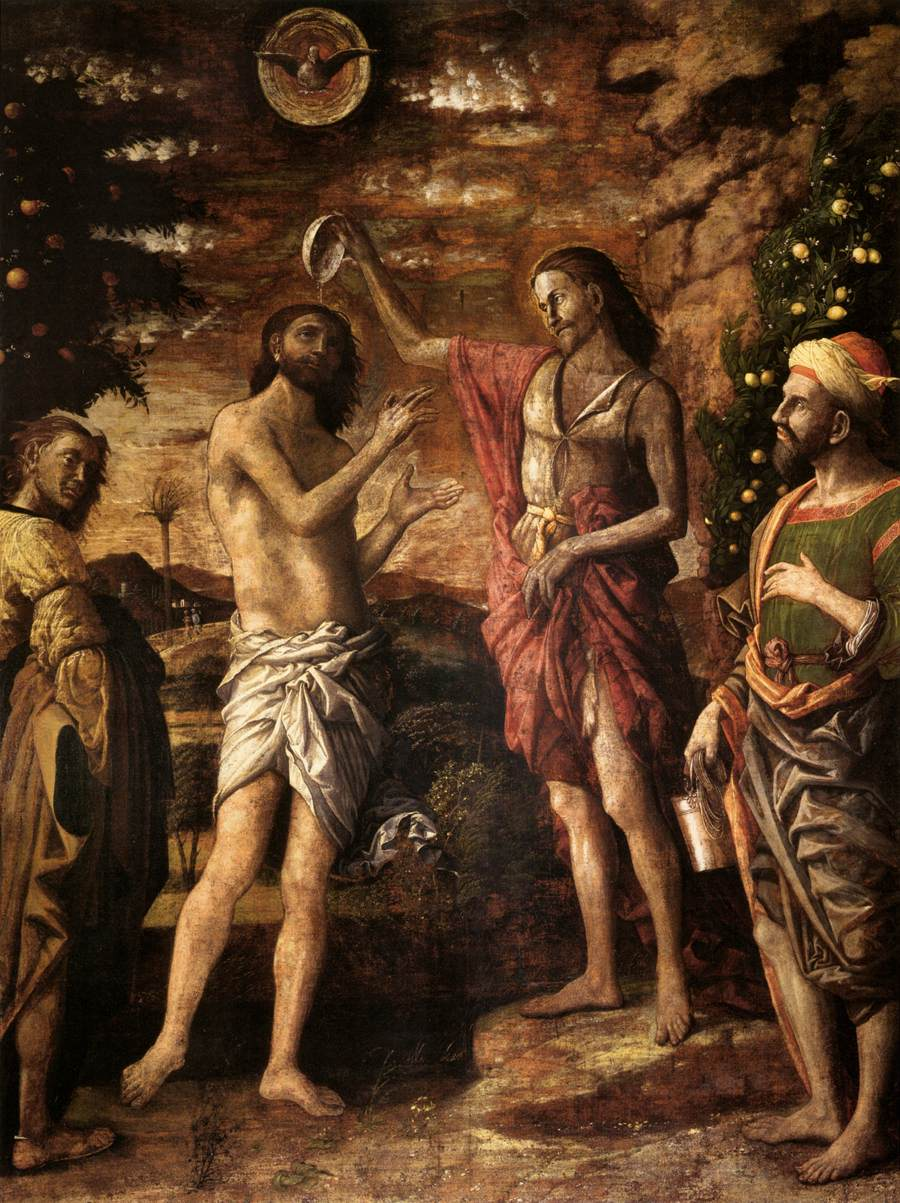
Andrea Mantegna, c. 1505

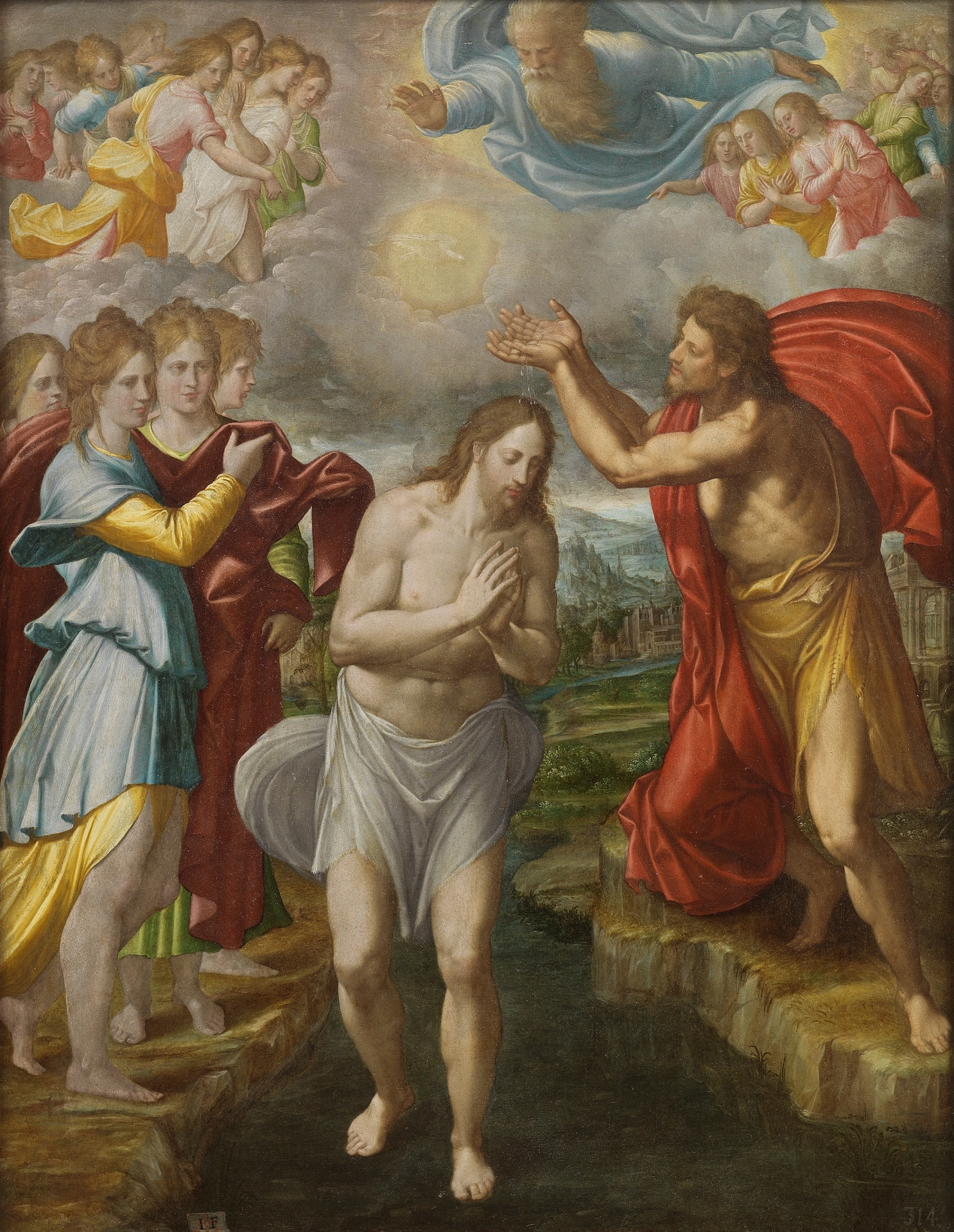
Juan Navarrete, 1567

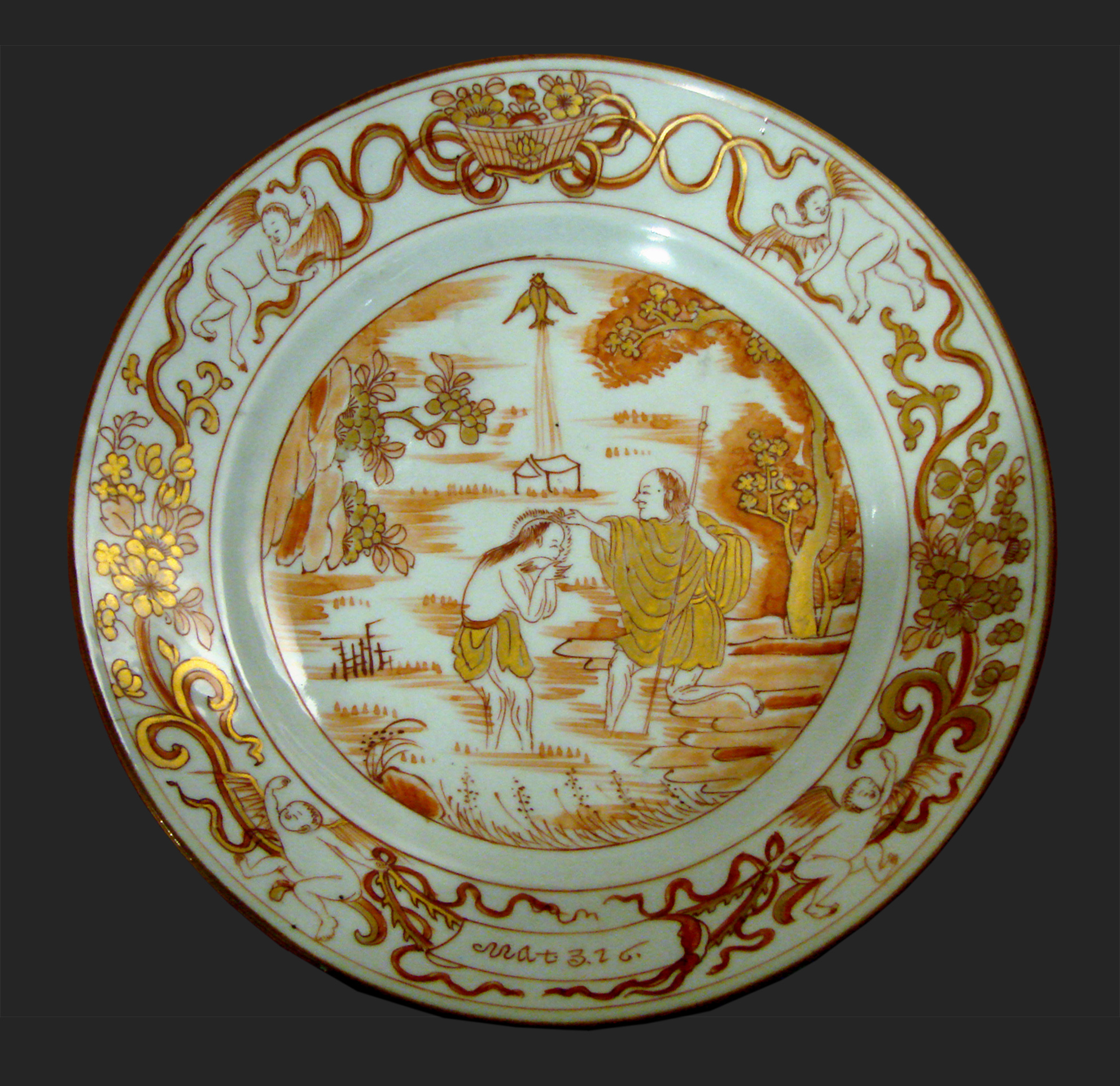
Chinese porcelain, Qing dynasty, early 18th century

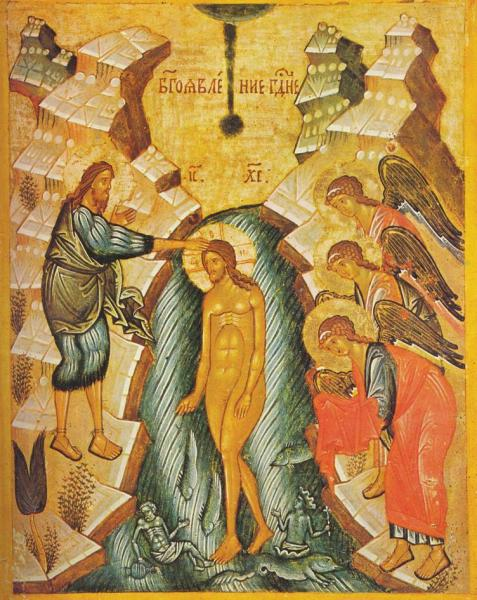
Eastern Orthodox icon

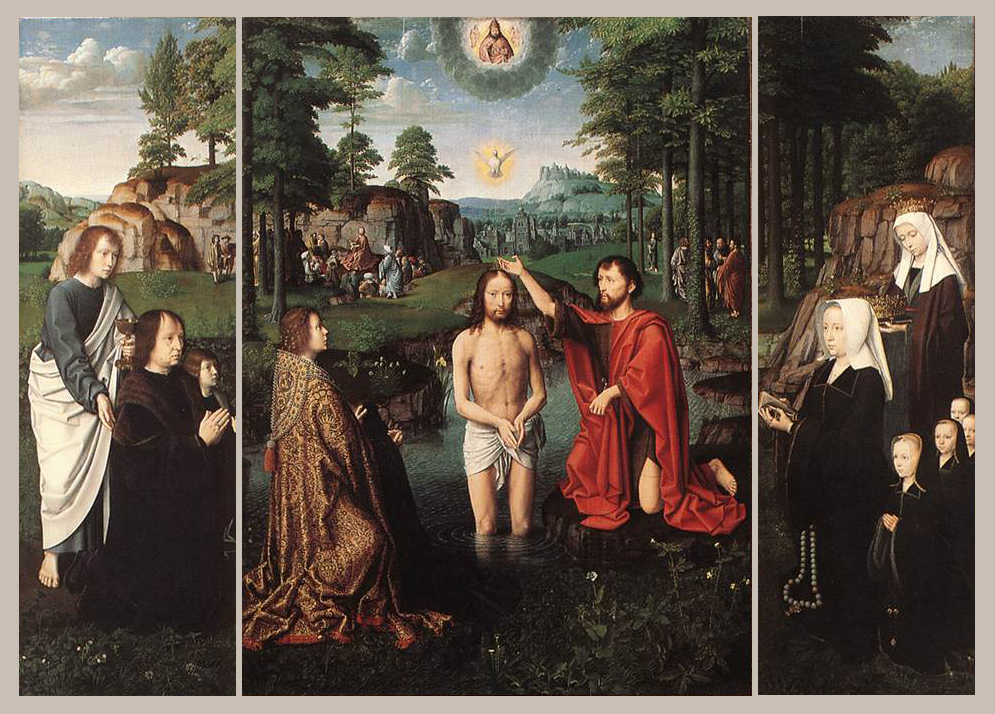
Gerard David – The Baptism of Christ, c. 1505

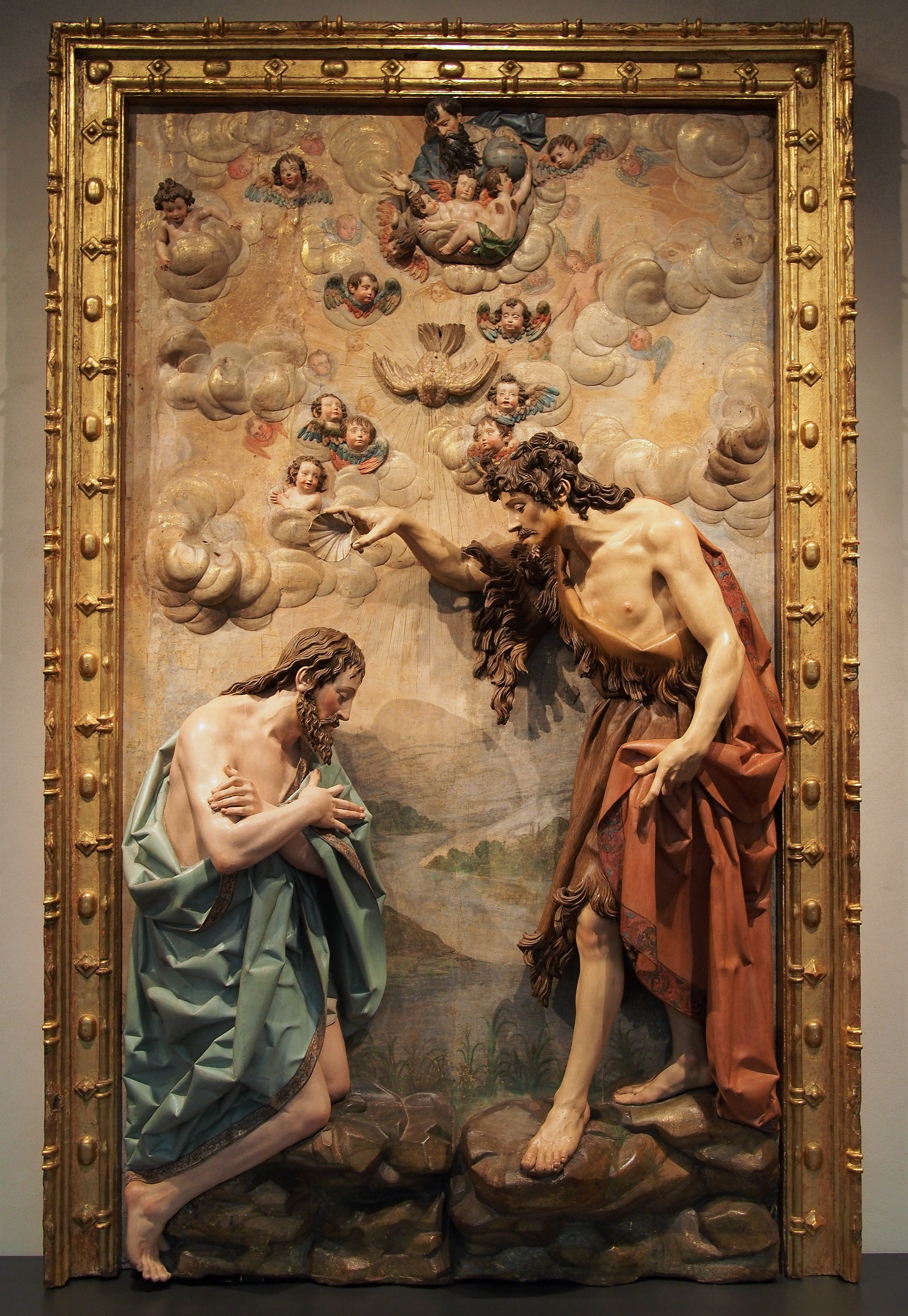
Gregorio Fernández, c. 1630

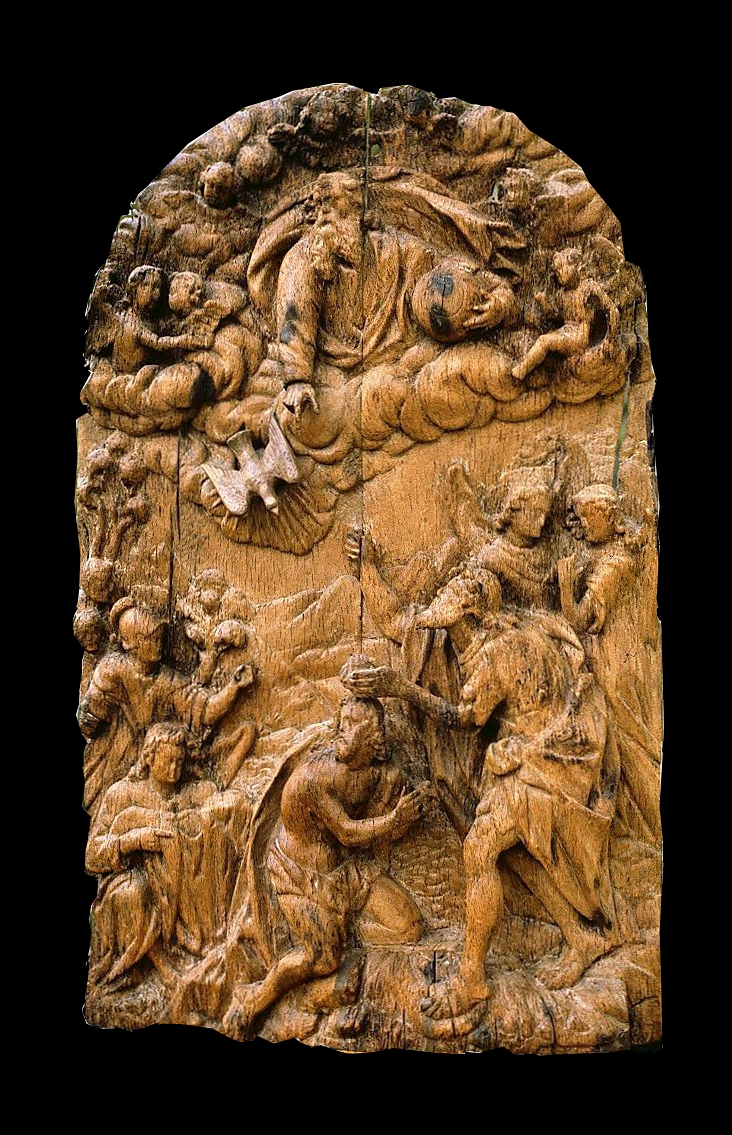
Relief in Kärlich, around the 17th century

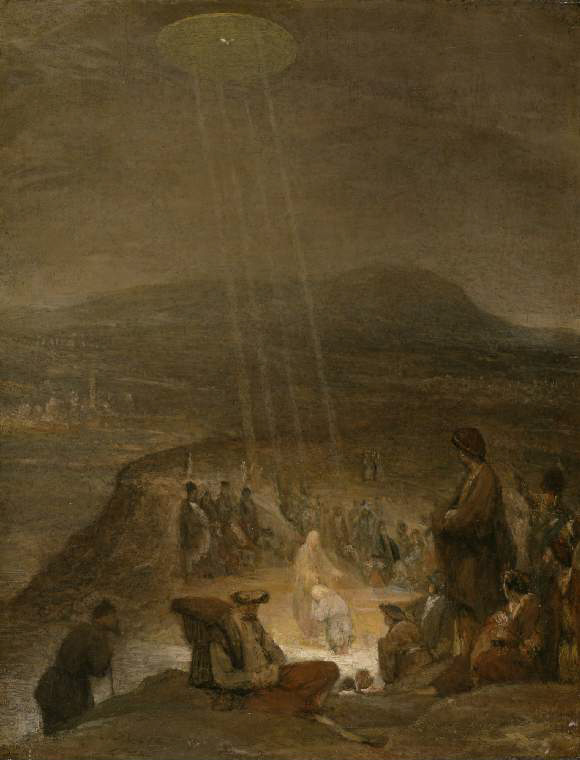
Aert de Gelder, c. 1710

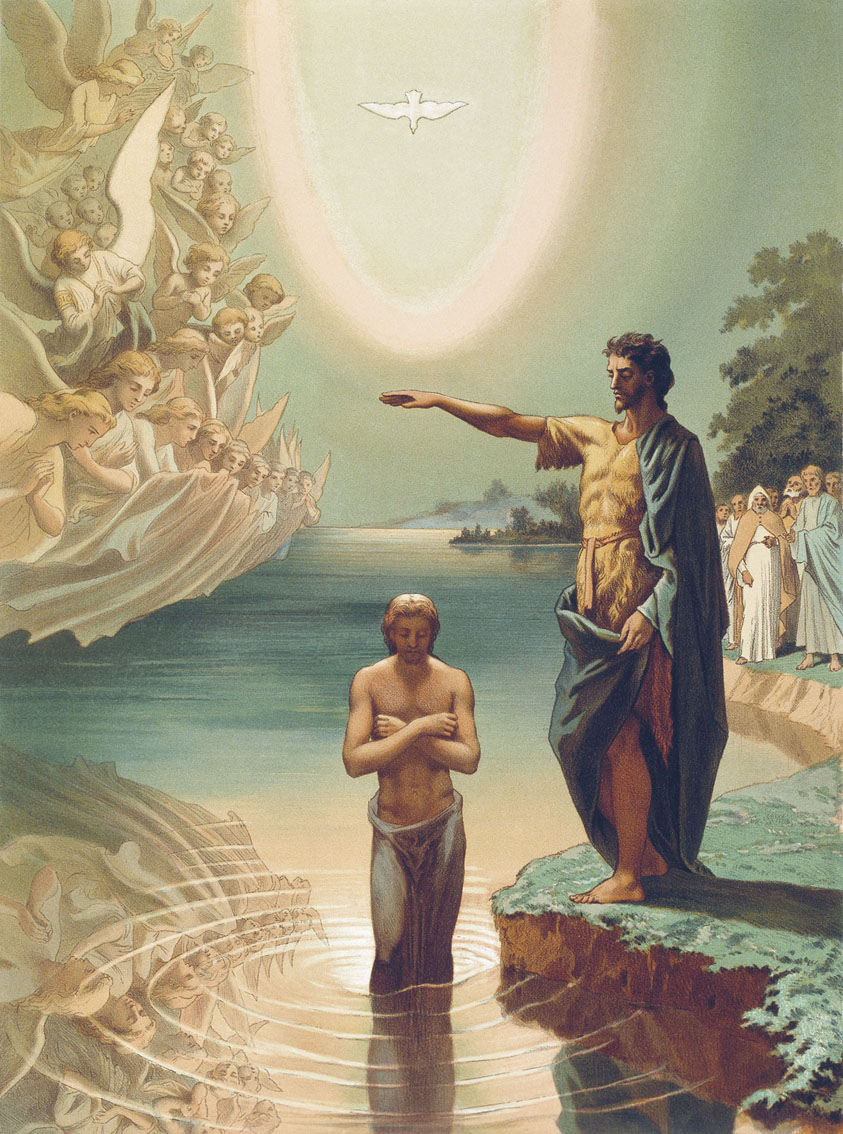
Grigory Gagarin, c. 1840–1850

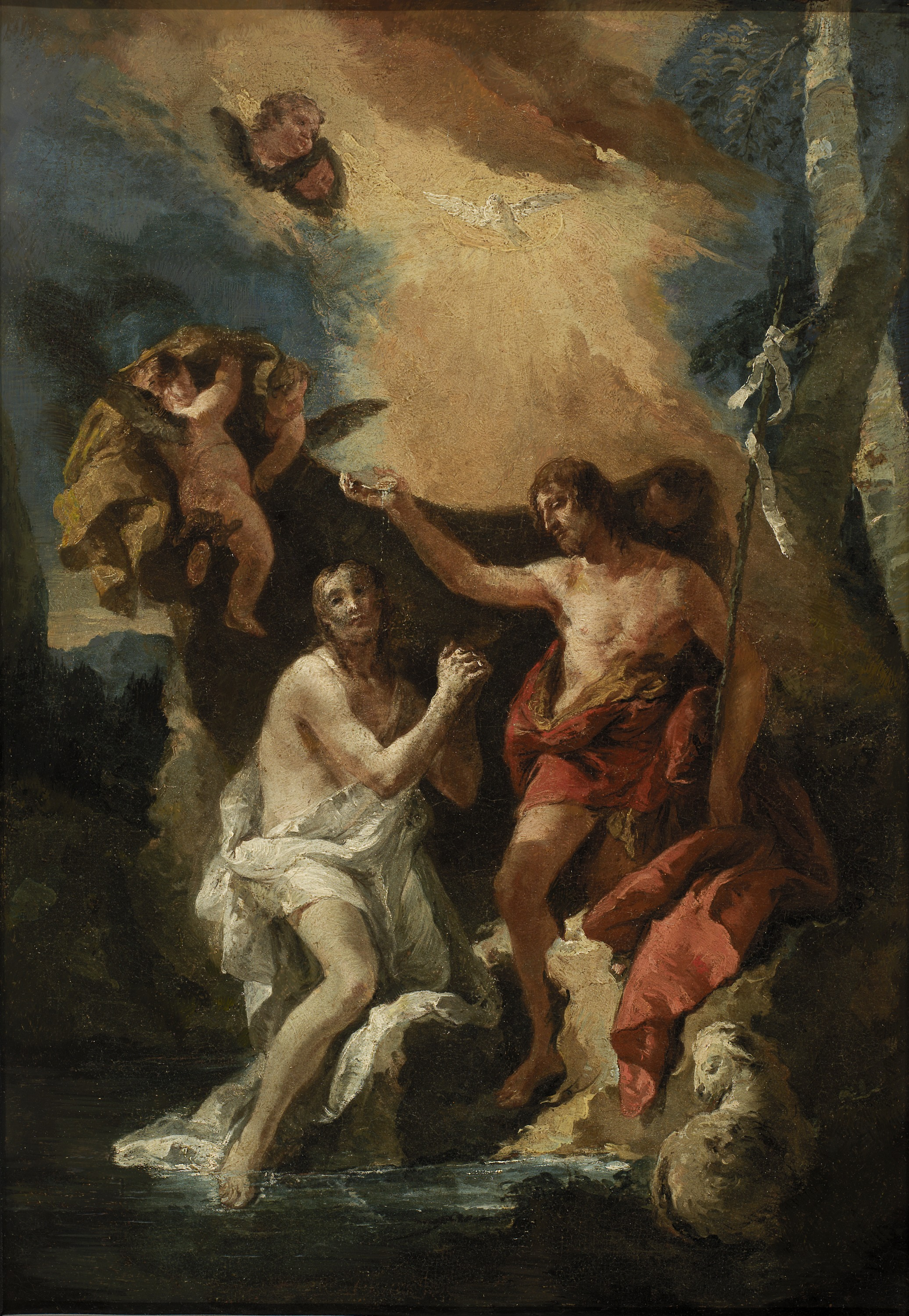
Giovanni Battista Tiepolo, Baptism of Christ, 18th century, Italy

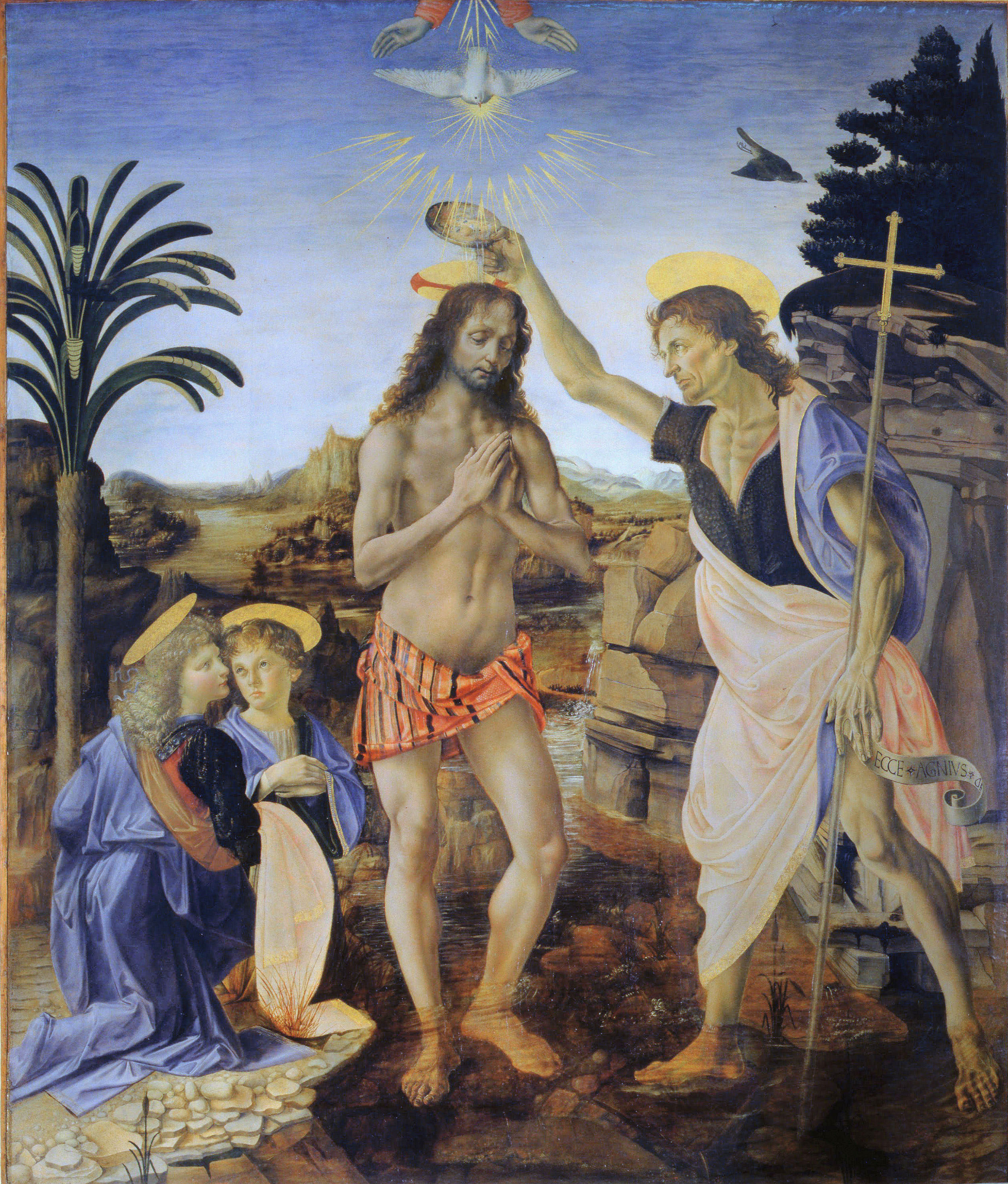
The Baptism of Christ by Andrea del Verrocchio and Leonardo da Vinci, c. 1475

== See also ==
- Ænon
- Bethabara
- Bimillenary of the baptism of Jesus
- Chronology of Jesus
- Epiphany (holiday)
- Life of Jesus in the New Testament
- Mandaeism
- New Testament places associated with Jesus
- Qasr el Yahud
- Sign of the Dove
- Transfiguration of Jesus

== Notes ==
Baptism of Jesus Life of Jesus: Ministry
Preceded by Ministry of John the Baptist, further preceded by Finding in the Temple	New Testament; Events	Succeeded by Temptation of Jesus
