= Crucifixion of Jesus =

Jesus' death as described in the gospels

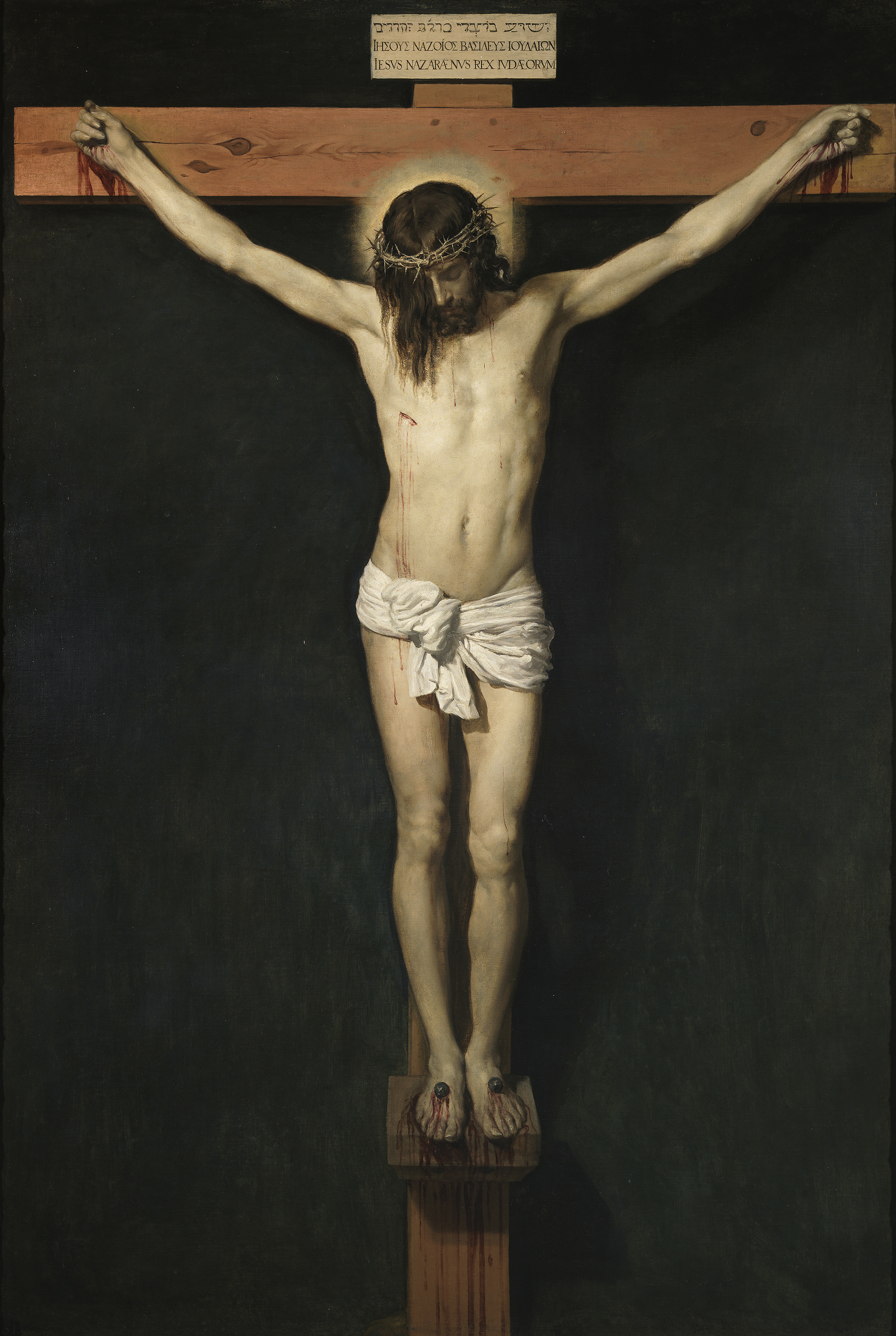
- Christ Crucified (c. 1632) by Diego Velázquez
- Date: AD 30/33
- Location: Jerusalem, Judaea, Roman Empire
- Type: Execution by crucifixion
- Cause: Condemnation before the Sanhedrin trial and Pilate's court over allegations of sedition, resulting in public calls for Jesus' death
- Participants: Roman army (executioners) Sanhedrin (orchestrators)
- Outcome: Ministry of the apostles of Jesus; Beginning of Christianity; Earliest persecution of Christians
- Deaths: Jesus

Jesus was put to death by crucifixion, being nailed to an instrument made by the Romans for capital punishment, commonly called a cross (Latin: crux). The instrument of crucifixion is taken to be an upright wooden beam to which was added a transverse wooden beam, thus forming a "cruciform" or T-shaped structure. His crucifixion occurred in 1st-century Judaea, most likely in AD 30 or AD 33. The event is described in the Bible's four canonical gospels, referred to in the New Testament epistles, and later attested to by other ancient sources. The historicity of Jesus' crucifixion is held by a near universal consensus of scholars, although there is no consensus on the details. According to the canonical gospels, Jesus was arrested and tried before the Sanhedrin, then brought before Pontius Pilate, who sentenced him to be scourged and crucified by the Romans, not for being found guilty but to satisfy either a crowd of people or the religious leaders gathered before Pilate.

Jesus was stripped of his clothing and offered vinegar mixed with myrrh or gall (likely posca) to drink. At Calvary (Golgotha), he was then hung between two convicted thieves and, according to the Gospel of Mark, was crucified at the third hour (9 a.m.), and died by the ninth hour of the day (at around 3:00 p.m.). During this time, the soldiers affixed a sign to the top of the cross stating "Jesus of Nazareth, King of the Jews" which, according to the Gospel of John, was written in three languages (Hebrew, Latin, and Greek). They then divided his garments among themselves and cast lots for his seamless robe, according to the Gospel of John. John also states that, after Jesus' death, one soldier (named in extra-biblical tradition as Longinus) pierced his side with a spear to be certain that he had died, then blood and water gushed from the wound. The Bible describes seven statements that Jesus made while he was on the cross, as well as several supernatural events that occurred.

Collectively referred to as the Passion, Jesus' suffering and redemptive death by crucifixion are the central aspects of Christian theology concerning the doctrines of salvation and atonement.

== New Testament narratives ==
Paul is the earliest surviving source to document Jesus' crucifixion. Scholars have used Paul's chronology as evidence for the date of the crucifixion. However, the earliest detailed accounts of the death of Jesus are contained in the four canonical gospels. In the Synoptic Gospels, Jesus predicts his death in three separate places. All four gospel accounts conclude with an extended narrative of Jesus' arrest, initial trial at the Sanhedrin and final trial at Pilate's court, where Jesus is flogged, condemned to death, is led to the place of crucifixion initially carrying his cross before Roman soldiers induce Simon of Cyrene to carry it, and then Jesus is crucified, entombed, and resurrected from the dead. In each gospel account these five events in the life of Jesus are treated with more intense detail than any other portion of that Gospel's narrative. Scholars note that the reader receives an almost hour-by-hour account of what is happening.

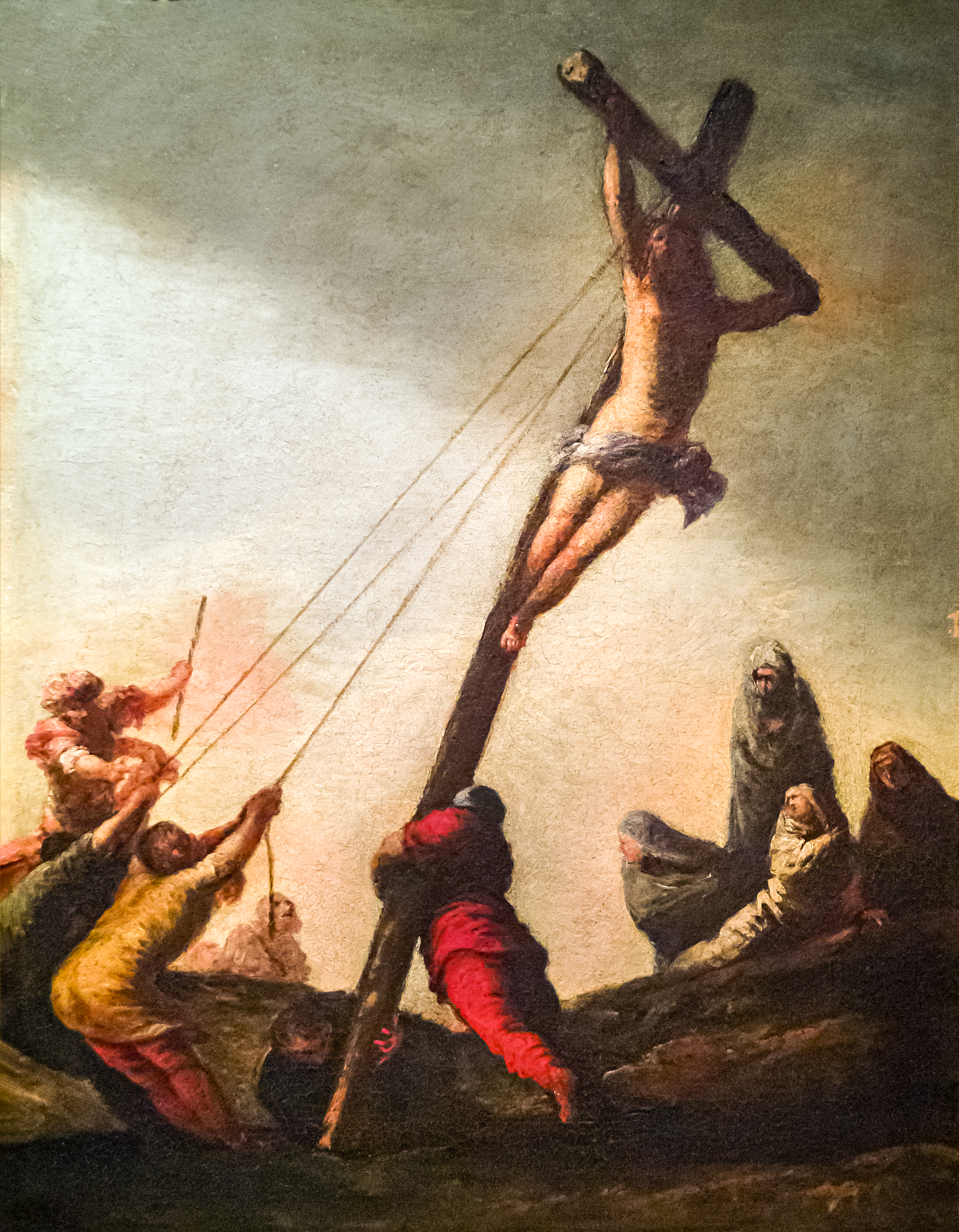
A depiction of the Raising of the Cross, by Sebastiano Mazzoni, 17th century, Ca' Rezzonico

After arriving at Calvary (also called Golgotha), Jesus was offered wine mixed with myrrh or gall (likely posca) to drink. Both the Gospel of Mark and the Gospel of Matthew record that he refused this. He was then crucified and hanged between two convicts. According to some translations of the original Greek, the convicts may have been bandits or Jewish rebels. According to the Gospel of Mark, he endured the torment of crucifixion from the third hour (between approximately 9 a.m. and noon), until his death at the ninth hour, corresponding to about 3 p.m. The soldiers affixed a sign above his head stating "Jesus of Nazareth, King of the Jews" which, according to the Gospel of John, was in three languages (Hebrew, Latin, and Greek), and then divided his garments and cast lots for his seamless robe. According to the Gospel of John, the Roman soldiers did not break Jesus' legs, as they did to the two crucified convicts (breaking the legs hastened the onset of death), as Jesus was dead already. Each gospel has its own account of Jesus' last words, seven statements altogether.

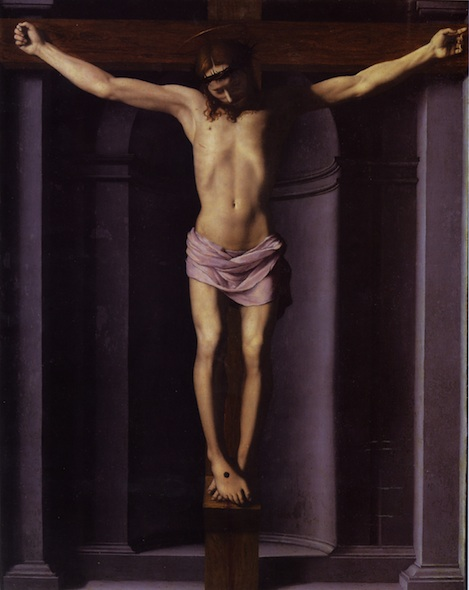
Bronzino's depiction of the crucifixion with three nails, no ropes, and a hypopodium standing support, c. 1545

All four gospel accounts state that, following Jesus' death, Joseph of Arimathea requested Jesus' body and buried it in a rock-cut tomb. The Gospel of Matthew alone suggests that Joseph provided his own tomb for this purpose.

The three Synoptic Gospels describe Simon of Cyrene bearing the cross, a crowd of people mocking Jesus along with the other two crucified men, darkness from the sixth to the ninth hour, and the temple veil being torn from top to bottom. The Synoptic Gospels also mention several witnesses, including a centurion, and several women who watched from a distance, two of whom were present during the burial.

The Gospel of Luke is the only gospel to omit the detail of the sour wine mix that was offered to Jesus on a reed, while only Mark and John describe Joseph actually taking the body down off the cross.

There are several details that are only mentioned in a single gospel account. For instance, only Matthew mentions an earthquake, resurrected saints who went to the city, and that Roman soldiers were assigned to guard the tomb, while Mark is the only one to state the time of the crucifixion (the third hour, or 9 a.m. – although it was probably as late as noon) and the centurion's report of Jesus' death. Luke's unique contributions to the narrative include Jesus' words to the women who were mourning, one criminal's rebuke of the other, the reaction of the multitudes who left "beating their breasts", and the women preparing spices and ointments before resting on the Sabbath. John is also the only one to refer to the request that the legs be broken and the soldier's subsequent piercing of Jesus' side (as fulfillment of Old Testament prophecy), as well as that Nicodemus assisted Joseph with burial.

According to the First Epistle to the Corinthians, chapter 15, Jesus was raised from the dead ("on the third day" counting the day of crucifixion as the first) and, according to the canonical gospels, appeared to his disciples on different occasions before ascending to heaven. The account given in Acts of the Apostles says that Jesus remained with the apostles for 40 days, whereas the account in the Gospel of Luke makes no clear distinction between the events of Easter Sunday and the Ascension. Most biblical scholars agree that the author of Luke also wrote the Acts of the Apostles as a follow-up volume to the Gospel of Luke account, and the two works must be considered as a whole.

In Mark, Jesus is crucified along with two rebels, and the sun goes dark or is obscured for three hours. Jesus calls out to God, then gives a shout and dies. The curtain of the Temple is torn in two. Matthew follows Mark, but mentions an earthquake and the resurrection of saints. Luke also follows Mark, although he describes the rebels as common criminals, one of whom defends Jesus, who in turn promises that he (Jesus) and the criminal will be together in paradise. Luke portrays Jesus as impassive in the face of his crucifixion. John includes several of the same elements as those found in Mark, though they are treated differently.

=== Textual comparison ===
The comparison below is based on the New International Version.

	Matthew	Mark	Luke	John
Way of the Cross	27:32–33	15:21–22	23:26–32	19:17
Way of the Cross	Soldiers had Simon of Cyrene carry Jesus' cross.	Soldiers had Simon of Cyrene carry Jesus' cross.	Soldiers had Simon of Cyrene carry Jesus' cross.	"They" had Jesus carry the cross.
Way of the Cross	—	—	Jesus said to wailing women: "Don't weep for me, but for yourselves and your children."	—
Crucifixion	27:34–36	15:23–25	23:33–34	19:18, 23–24
Crucifixion	Jesus tasted wine mixed with gall, refused to drink more.	Jesus refused to drink wine mixed with myrrh.	—	—
Crucifixion	Soldiers crucified Jesus, cast lots for his clothes and kept watch.	Soldiers crucified Jesus and cast lots for his clothes.	Soldiers crucified Jesus and cast lots for his clothes.	"They" crucified Jesus and four soldiers each took a garment, casting lots over the undergarment (this fulfilled a prophecy).
Crucifixion	—	—	Jesus: "Father, forgive them, for they don't know what they're doing."	—
Crucifixion	—	This happened at nine in the morning on the day of Passover (14:12, 15:25).	—	This happened at "about noon" on the Day of Preparation before Passover (19:14, 31)
Mocking	27:37–44	15:26–32	23:35–43	19:19–22, 25–27
Mocking	Sign: "This is Jesus, the king of the Jews".	Sign: "The king of the Jews".	Sign: "This is the king of the Jews".	Sign: "Jesus of Nazareth, the king of the Jews".
Mocking	—	—	—	Religious leaders complained to Pilate: "Don't write "King of the Jews", but that this man claimed to be king of the Jews." Pilate: "Quod scripsi, scripsi."
Mocking	Passersby, religious leaders, teachers of the law, elders and both rebels mocked Jesus.	Passersby, religious leaders, teachers of the law and both rebels mocked Jesus.	The people's rulers, soldiers (offered wine vinegar) and one criminal mocked Jesus.	—
Mocking	—	—	The other criminal defended him, and asked Jesus to remember him.	Jesus' mother Mary, Mary of Clopas and Mary Magdalene stood near the cross.
Mocking	—	—	—	Jesus told Mary: "That is your son", and told the beloved disciple: "That is your mother."
Mocking	—	—	Jesus: "Truly I tell you, today you will be with me in paradise."	—
Death	27:45–56	15:33–41	23:44–49	19:28–37
Death	At noon, a three-hour-long darkness came across the land.	At noon, a three-hour-long darkness came across the land.	About noon, a three-hour-long darkness came across the land.	—
Death	About three, Jesus cried out loud: "Eli, Eli, lema sabachtani?"	At three, Jesus cried out loud: "Eloï, Eloï, lema sabachtani?"	—	To fulfill Scripture, Jesus said: "I am thirsty."
Death	Bystander offered Jesus wine vinegar, others said: "Now let's see if Elijah saves him."	Bystander offered Jesus wine vinegar and said: "Now let's see if Elijah comes to take him down."	—	"They" let Jesus drink wine vinegar.
Death	—	—	—	Jesus said: "It is finished," and died.
Death	Jesus cried out again and died.	Jesus cried out loud and died.	Jesus called out loud: "Father, into your hands I commit my spirit," and died.	—
Death	Temple curtain ripped, earthquake.	Temple curtain ripped.	(Before death) Temple curtain ripped.	—
Death	Tombs broke open, many dead came back to life and appeared to many people in Jerusalem.	—	—	—
Death	Centurion and soldiers terrified: "Surely he was the Son of God."	Centurion: "Surely this man was the Son of God."	Centurion: "Surely this was a righteous man."	—
Death	—	—	—	Soldiers broke the legs of the other two crucified men, but not Jesus' legs (this fulfilled a prophecy), but did pierce his side with a spear (this fulfilled another prophecy).
Death	—	—	Bystanders beat their chest and went away.	—
Death	Many women from Galilee looked on from a distance, including Mary Magdalene, Mary, mother of James and Joseph and the mother of Zebedee's sons.	From a distance, the women from Galilee looked on, including Mary Magdalene, Mary, mother of James and Joses and Salome.	Those who know him, including the Galilean women, stood at a distance.	—

== Other accounts and references ==
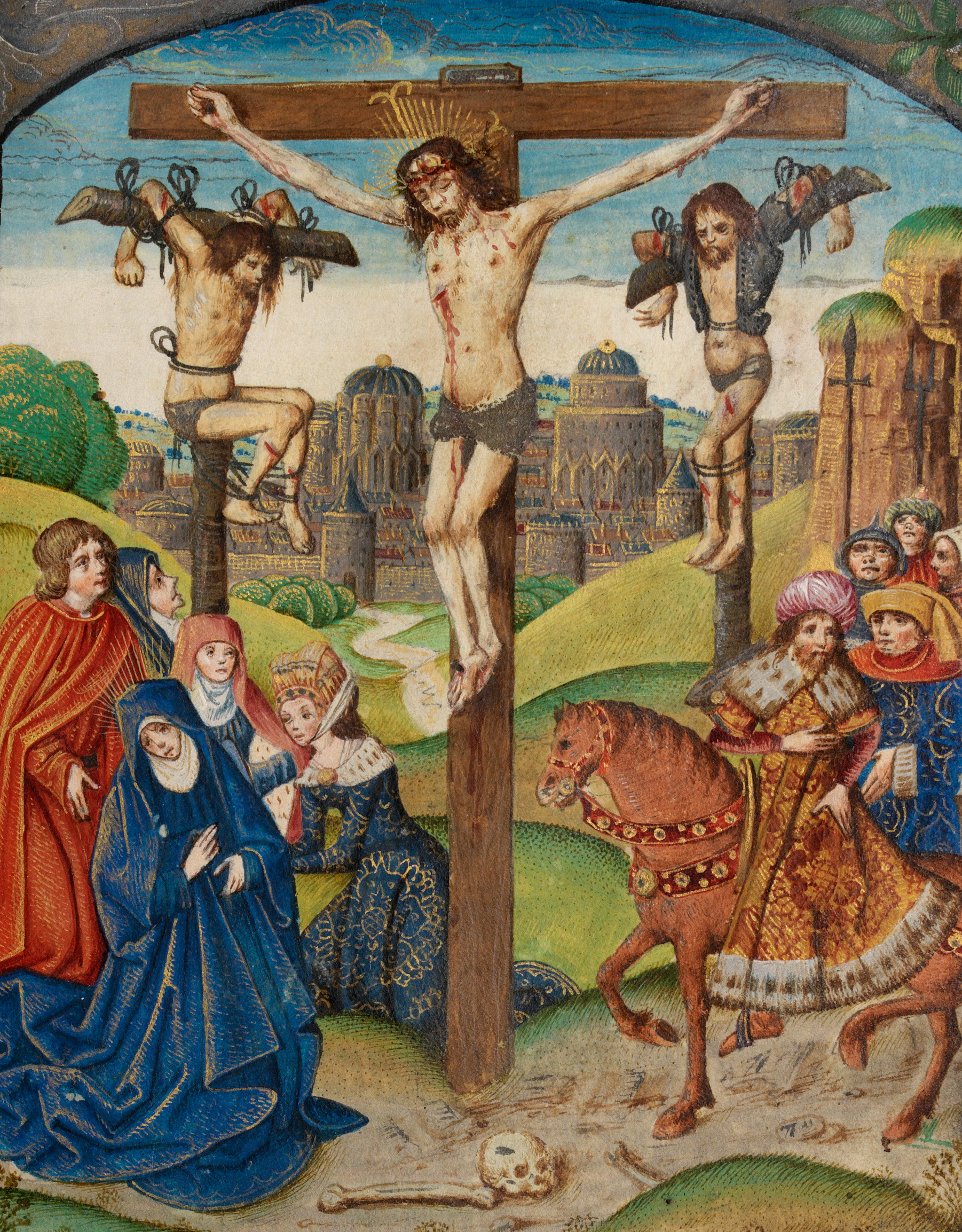
Christ on the Cross between two thieves. Illumination from the Vaux Passional, 16th century

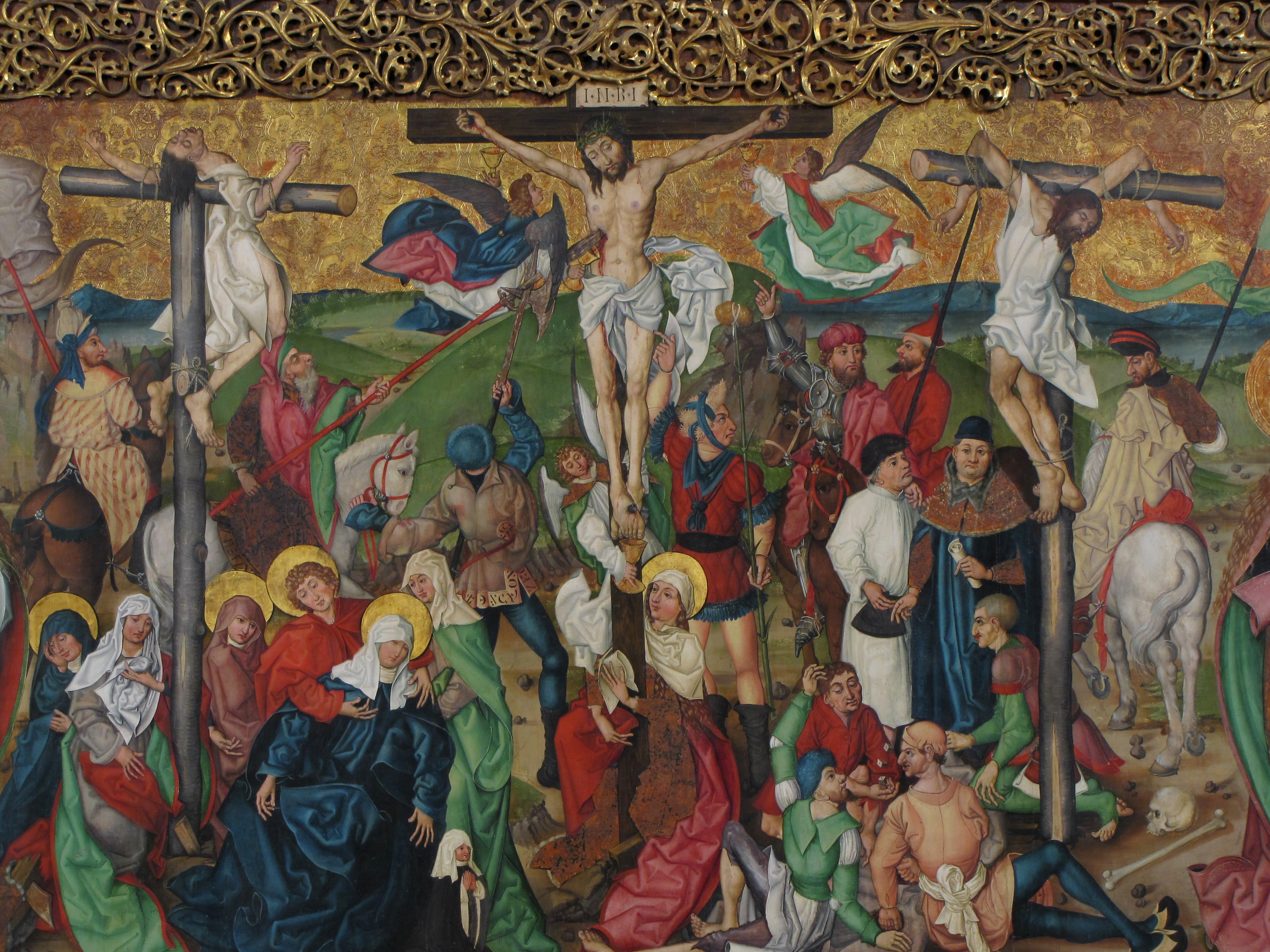
Crucifixion, from the Buhl Altarpiece, a particularly large Gothic oil on panel painting from the 1490s

=== Mara bar Serapion ===
An early non-Christian reference to the crucifixion of Jesus is likely to be Mara bar Serapion's letter to his son, written some time after 73 but before the 3rd century. The letter includes no Christian themes and the author is presumed to be neither Jewish nor Christian. The letter refers to the retributions that followed the unjust treatment of three wise men: Socrates, Pythagoras, and "the wise king" of the Jews. Some scholars see little doubt that the reference to the execution of the "king of the Jews" is about the crucifixion of Jesus, while others place less value in the letter, given the ambiguity in the reference.

=== Josephus ===
In the Antiquities of the Jews (written about 93) Jewish historian Josephus stated (Ant 18.3) that Jesus was crucified by Pilate, writing that:

Now there was about this time Jesus, a wise man, ... He drew over to him both many of the Jews and many of the Gentiles ... And when Pilate, at the suggestion of the principal men amongst us, had condemned him to the cross ...

Most modern scholars agree that while this Josephus passage (called the Testimonium Flavianum) includes some later interpolations, it originally consisted of an authentic nucleus with a reference to the execution of Jesus by Pilate. James Dunn states that there is "broad consensus" among scholars regarding the nature of an authentic reference to the crucifixion of Jesus in the Testimonium.

=== Tacitus ===
Early in the 2nd century another reference to the crucifixion of Jesus was made by Tacitus, generally considered one of the greatest Roman historians. Writing in The Annals (c. 116), Tacitus described the persecution of Christians by Nero and stated (Annals 15.44) that Pilate ordered the execution of Jesus:

Nero fastened the guilt and inflicted the most exquisite tortures on a class hated for their abominations, called Christians by the populace. Christus, from whom the name had its origin, suffered the extreme penalty during the reign of Tiberius at the hands of one of our procurators, Pontius Pilatus.

Scholars generally consider the Tacitus reference to the execution of Jesus by Pilate to be genuine, and of historical value as an independent Roman source. Eddy and Boyd state that it is now "firmly established" that Tacitus provides a non-Christian confirmation of the crucifixion of Jesus.

=== Lucian ===
In his satirical letter Passing of Peregrinus, the 2nd century satirist Lucian mentions Jesus' crucifixion:

The Christians, you know, worship a man to this day—the distinguished personage who introduced their novel rites, and was crucified on that account.

Given that Lucian's understanding of Christian traditions has significant gaps and errors, his writing is unlikely to have been influenced by Christians themselves, and he may provide an independent statement about the crucifixion of Jesus.

=== Celsus ===
Another reference to the crucifixion of Jesus in the 2nd century was made by Celsus, a Greek philosopher and opponent of early Christianity. His literary work The True Word survives exclusively via quotations in Contra Celsum, written in 248 by Origen of Alexandria in order to refute Celsus' claims about Christianity. Origen quotes Celsus as saying:

You ... mock and revile the statues of our gods; but if you had reviled Bacchus or Hercules in person, you would not perhaps have done so with impunity. But those who crucified your God when present among men, suffered nothing for it, either at the time or during the whole of their lives.

=== Talmud ===
Another possible reference to the crucifixion ("hanging", cf. Luke 23:39; Galatians 3:13) is found in the Babylonian Talmud:

On the eve of the Passover Yeshu was hanged. For forty days before the execution took place, a herald went forth and cried, "He is going forth to be stoned because he has practised sorcery and enticed Israel to apostasy. Anyone who can say anything in his favour, let him come forward and plead on his behalf." But since nothing was brought forward in his favour he was hanged on the eve of the Passover.

— Sanhedrin 43a, Babylonian Talmud (Soncino Edition)

Although the question of the equivalence of the identities of Yeshu and Jesus has at times been debated, many historians agree that the above 3rd-4th century passage is likely to be about Jesus, Peter Schäfer stating that there can be no doubt that this narrative of the execution in the Talmud refers to Jesus of Nazareth. Robert Van Voorst states that the Sanhedrin 43a reference to Jesus can be confirmed not only from the reference itself, but from the context that surrounds it. But conversely, Sanhedrin 43a relates that Yeshu had been condemned to death by the royal government of Judaea – this lineage was stripped of all legal authority upon Herod the Great's ascension to the throne in 37 BC, meaning the execution had to have taken place close to 40 years before Jesus was even born.

=== Samaritanism ===
Samaritan tradition preserved in the Tolidah places the death of Jesus during the reign of Tiberius and attributes it to Pontius Pilate, under the Samaritan High Priest Yahunatan.

“During the days of Yahunatan, Jesus, son of Mary, [and] son of Joseph the carpenter, the son of the adulteress, was killed in ‘Cursed Salem’ during the reign of Tiberius, king of Rome, by Pilate the Archon.”

The account refers to both Mary and Jerusalem in strongly polemical language.

=== Islam ===
Muslims maintain that Jesus was not crucified and that those who thought they had killed him had mistakenly killed someone else in his place, whether Judas Iscariot, Simon of Cyrene, or someone else. They hold this belief based on various interpretations of Quran 4:157–158, which states: "they killed him not, nor crucified him, but so it was made to appear to them [or, it appeared so unto them], ... Nay, Allah raised him up unto Himself".

=== Gnosticism ===
Some early Christian Gnostic sects, believing Jesus did not have a physical substance, denied that he was crucified. In response, Ignatius of Antioch insisted that Jesus was truly born and was truly crucified and wrote that those who held that Jesus only seemed to suffer only seemed to be Christians.

== Historicity ==
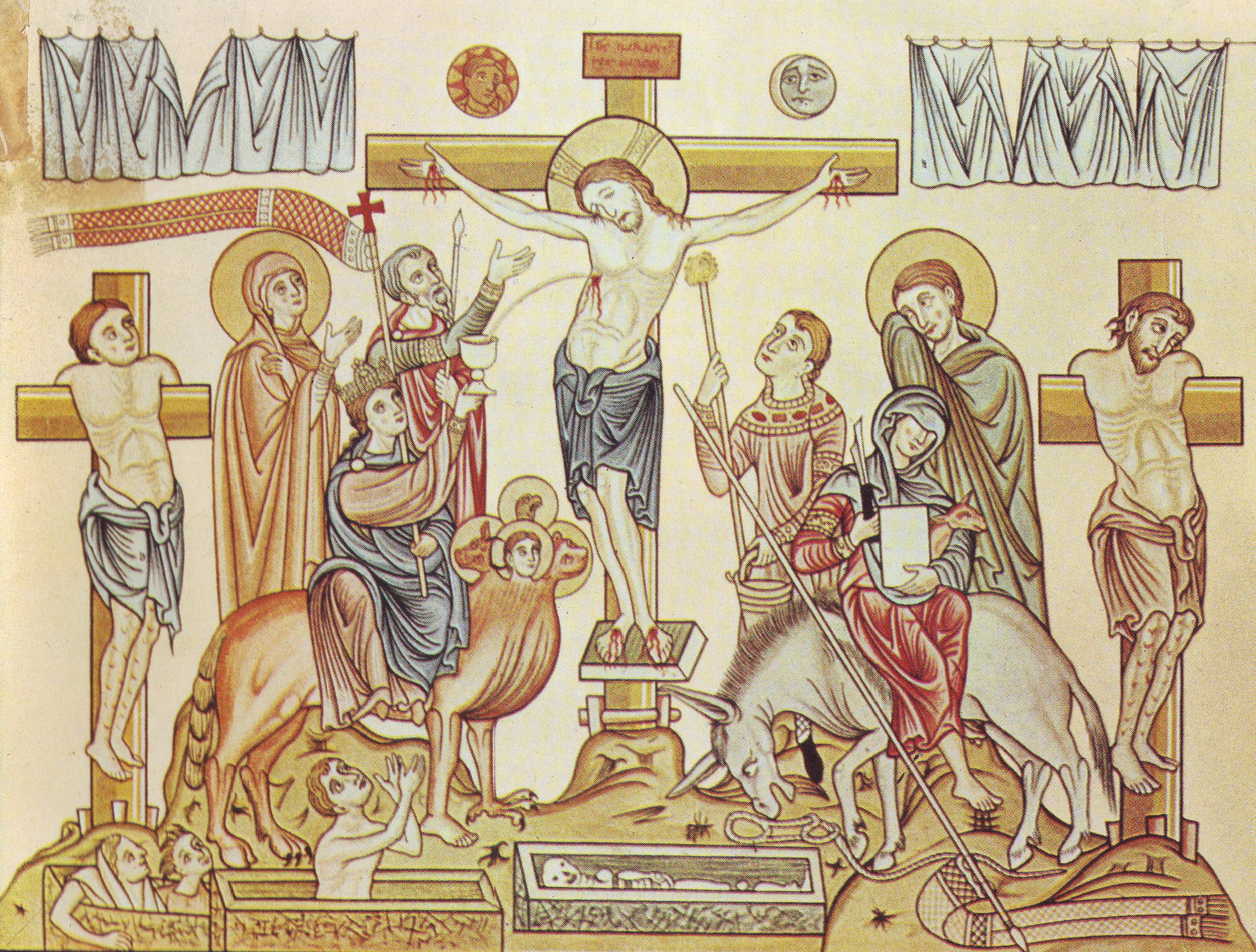
Crucifixion of Jesus of Nazareth, medieval illustration from the Hortus deliciarum of Herrad of Landsberg, 12th century

In scholarship on the historical Jesus, the baptism of Jesus and his crucifixion are considered to be the two most certain historical facts about Jesus. (Note: Historicity: Dunn (2003, p. 339) states that these "two facts in the life of Jesus command almost universal assent" and "rank so high on the 'almost impossible to doubt or deny' scale of historical facts" that they are often the starting points for the study of the historical Jesus.) Various criteria are used to determine the historicity of the elements of the New Testamentical narratives, and help to establish the crucifixion of Jesus as a historical event. The criterion of embarrassment argues that Christians would not have invented the painful death of their leader. The criterion of multiple attestation is the confirmation by more than one source, including multiple non-Christian sources, (Note: Non-Christian sources: Crossan (1995, p. 145): "That he was crucified is as sure as anything historical can ever be, since both Josephus and Tacitus ... agree with the Christian accounts on at least that basic fact.; Eddy & Boyd (2007, p. 127) state that it is now "firmly established" that there is non-Christian confirmation of the crucifixion of Jesus.) and the criterion of coherence argues that it fits with other historical elements.

According to biblical scholar Gerd Lüdemann, "Three conclusions can be drawn from this mode of death: (a) Romans put Jesus to death; (b) there were Roman legal proceedings beforehand; (c) Jesus was condemned for a political crime."

Although scholars agree on the historicity of the crucifixion, they differ on the reason and context for it. For example, both E. P. Sanders and Paula Fredriksen support the historicity of the crucifixion, but contend that Jesus did not foretell his own crucifixion and that his prediction of the crucifixion is a "church creation". On the other hand, Michael Patrick Barber argues that the Historical Jesus predicted his violent death. Tucker Ferda argues that the Historical Jesus did believe he might die. Geza Vermes also views the crucifixion as a historical event, but provides his own explanation and background for it. Bart Ehrman states that Jesus portrayed himself as the leader of the future Kingdom and that a number of criteria – the criterion of multiple attestation and criterion of dissimilarity – establishes the crucifixion of Jesus as an enemy of state.

Although almost all ancient sources relating to crucifixion are literary, in 1968, an archeological discovery just northeast of Jerusalem uncovered the body of a crucified man dated to the 1st century, which provided good confirmatory evidence that crucifixions occurred during the Roman period roughly according to the manner in which the crucifixion of Jesus is described in the gospels. The crucified man was identified as Yehohanan ben Hagkol and probably died about AD 70, around the time of the Jewish revolt against Rome. The analyses at the Hadassah Medical School estimated that he died in his late 20s. Another relevant archaeological find, which also dates to the 1st century AD, is an unidentified heel bone with a spike discovered in a Jerusalem gravesite, now held by the Israel Antiquities Authority and displayed in the Israel Museum.

== Details ==
=== Chronology ===
There is no consensus regarding the exact date of the crucifixion of Jesus, although it is generally agreed by biblical scholars that it was on a Friday on or near Passover (Nisan 14), during the governorship of Pontius Pilate (who ruled AD 26–36). Various approaches have been used to estimate the year of the crucifixion, including the canonical Gospels, the chronology of the life of Paul, as well as different astronomical models. Scholars have provided estimates in the range AD 30–33, with Rainer Riesner stating that "the fourteenth of Nisan (7 April) of the year 30 AD is, apparently in the opinion of the majority of contemporary scholars as well, far and away the most likely date of the crucifixion of Jesus." Another preferred date among scholars is Friday, 3 April, AD 33.

The consensus of scholarship is that the New Testament accounts represent a crucifixion occurring on a Friday, but a Thursday or Wednesday crucifixion have also been proposed. Some scholars explain a Thursday crucifixion based on a "double sabbath" caused by an extra Passover sabbath falling on Thursday dusk to Friday afternoon, ahead of the normal weekly Sabbath. Some have argued that Jesus was crucified on Wednesday, not Friday, on the grounds of the mention of "three days and three nights" in Matthew 12:40 before his resurrection, celebrated on Sunday. Others have countered by saying that this ignores the Jewish idiom by which a "day and night" may refer to any part of a 24-hour period, that the expression in Matthew is idiomatic, not a statement that Jesus was 72 hours in the tomb, and that the many references to a resurrection on the third day do not require three literal nights. Furthermore, a few scholars have made the case that Matthew used the phrase "the heart of the earth" to refer to Jerusalem, and thus the period includes the entirety of the time Jesus spent in Jerusalem following his return from Bethany on Thursday, which lasted exactly three days and three nights.

In Mark 15:25 crucifixion takes place at the third hour (9 a.m.) and Jesus' death at the ninth hour (3 p.m.). In John 19:14 Jesus is still before Pilate at the sixth hour. Scholars have presented a number of arguments to deal with the issue, some suggesting a reconciliation, e.g., based on the use of Roman timekeeping in John, since Roman timekeeping began at midnight and this would mean being before Pilate at the sixth hour was 6 a.m., yet others have rejected the arguments. Several scholars have argued that the modern precision of marking the time of day should not be read back into the gospel accounts, written at a time when no standardization of timepieces, or exact recording of hours and minutes was available, and time was often approximated to the closest three-hour period.

=== Path ===
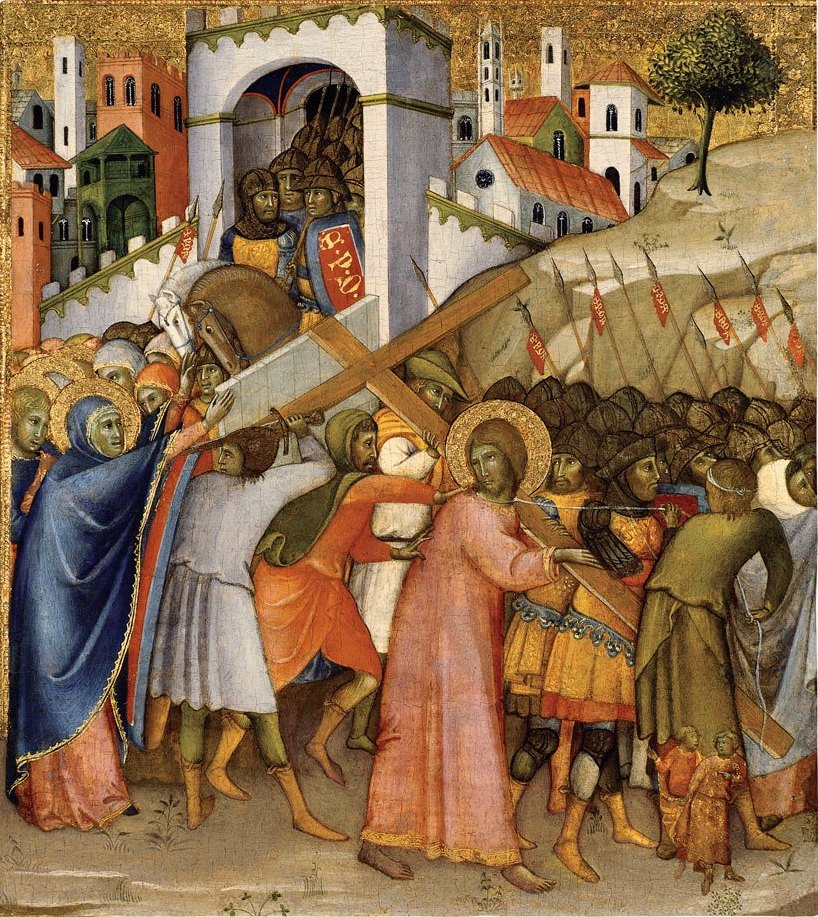
Andrea di Bartolo, Way to Calvary, c. 1400. The cluster of halos at the left are the Virgin Mary in front, with the Three Marys.

The three Synoptic Gospels refer to a man called Simon of Cyrene whom the Roman soldiers order to carry the cross after Jesus initially carries it but then collapses, while the Gospel of John just says that Jesus "bears" his own cross.

Luke's gospel also describes an interaction between Jesus and the women among the crowd of mourners following him, quoting Jesus as saying "Daughters of Jerusalem, do not weep for me, but weep for yourselves and for your children. For behold, the days are coming when they will say, 'Blessed are the barren and the wombs that never bore and the breasts that never nursed!' Then they will begin to say to the mountains, 'Fall on us,' and to the hills, 'Cover us.' For if they do these things when the wood is green, what will happen when it is dry?"

The Gospel of Luke has Jesus address these women as "daughters of Jerusalem", thus distinguishing them from the women whom the same gospel describes as "the women who had followed him from Galilee" and who were present at his crucifixion.

Traditionally, the path that Jesus took is called Via Dolorosa (Latin for "Way of Grief" or "Way of Suffering") and is a street in the Old City of Jerusalem. It is marked by nine of the fourteen Stations of the Cross. It passes the Ecce Homo Church and the last five stations are inside the Church of the Holy Sepulchre.

There is no reference to a woman named Veronica in the Gospels, but sources such as Acta Sanctorum describe her as a pious woman of Jerusalem who, moved with pity as Jesus carried his cross to Golgotha, gave him her veil that he might wipe his forehead.

=== Location ===
A diagram of the Church of the Holy Sepulchre and the historical site

The precise location of the crucifixion remains a matter of conjecture, but the biblical accounts indicate that it was outside the city walls of Jerusalem, accessible to passers-by and observable from some distance away. Eusebius identified its location only as being north of Mount Zion, which is consistent with the two most popularly suggested sites of modern times.

Calvary as an English name for the place is derived from the Latin word for skull (calvaria), which is used in the Vulgate translation of "place of a skull", the explanation given in all four Gospels of the Aramaic word Gûlgaltâ (transliterated into the Greek as Γολγοθᾶ (Golgotha)), which was the name of the place where Jesus was crucified. The text does not indicate why it was so designated, but several theories have been put forward. One is that as a place of public execution, Calvary may have been strewn with the skulls of abandoned victims (which would be contrary to Jewish burial traditions, but not Roman). Another is that Calvary is named after a nearby cemetery (which is consistent with both of the proposed modern sites). A third is that the name was derived from the physical contour, which would be more consistent with the singular use of the word, i.e., the place of "a skull". While often referred to as "Mount Calvary", it was more likely a small hill or rocky knoll.

The traditional site, inside what is now occupied by the Church of the Holy Sepulchre in the Christian Quarter of the Old City, has been attested since the 4th century. A second site (commonly referred to as Gordon's Calvary), located further north of the Old City near a place popularly called the Garden Tomb, has been promoted since the 19th century.

=== People present ===
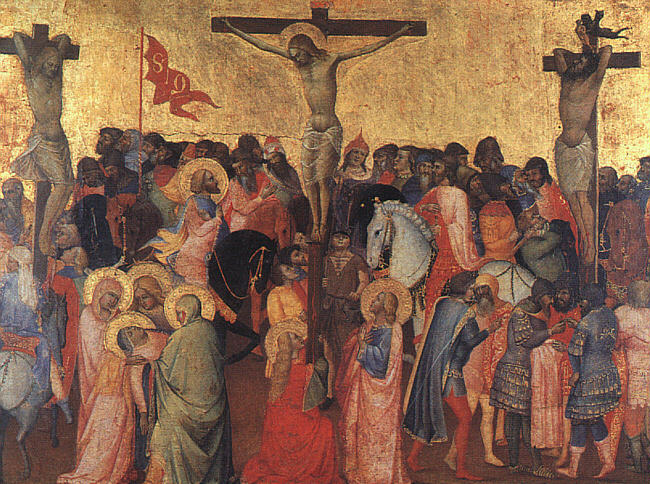
Crucifixion by Agnolo Gaddi, between 1390 and 1396, depicting several women at the crucifixion

The Gospels describe various women at the crucifixion, some of whom are named. According to Mark, many women were present, among them Mary Magdalene, Mary, mother of James and Mary of Clopas, commonly known as "the Three Marys". The Gospel of Matthew also mentions several women being present, among them Mary Magdalene, Mary, mother of James and the mother of Zebedee's children. Although a group of women is mentioned in Luke, neither is named. The Gospel of John speaks of women present, among them the mother of Jesus, Mary Magdalene and Mary of Clopas.

Aside from these women, the three Synoptic Gospels speak of the presence of others: "the chief priests, with the scribes and elders", two crucified criminals, to Jesus' right and left, "the soldiers", "the centurion and those who were with him, keeping watch over Jesus", passers-by, "bystanders", "the crowds that had assembled for this spectacle", and "his acquaintances". The two criminals are described as λῃσταί (variously translated as robbers, rebels or thieves) and further discussed in the Gospel of Luke as the penitent thief and the impenitent thief.

The Gospel of John mentions the soldiers and "the disciple whom Jesus loved", who is with the women.

The Gospels also tell of the arrival, after the death of Jesus, of Joseph of Arimathea (in the four Gospels) and of Nicodemus (only in John).

=== Method and manner ===
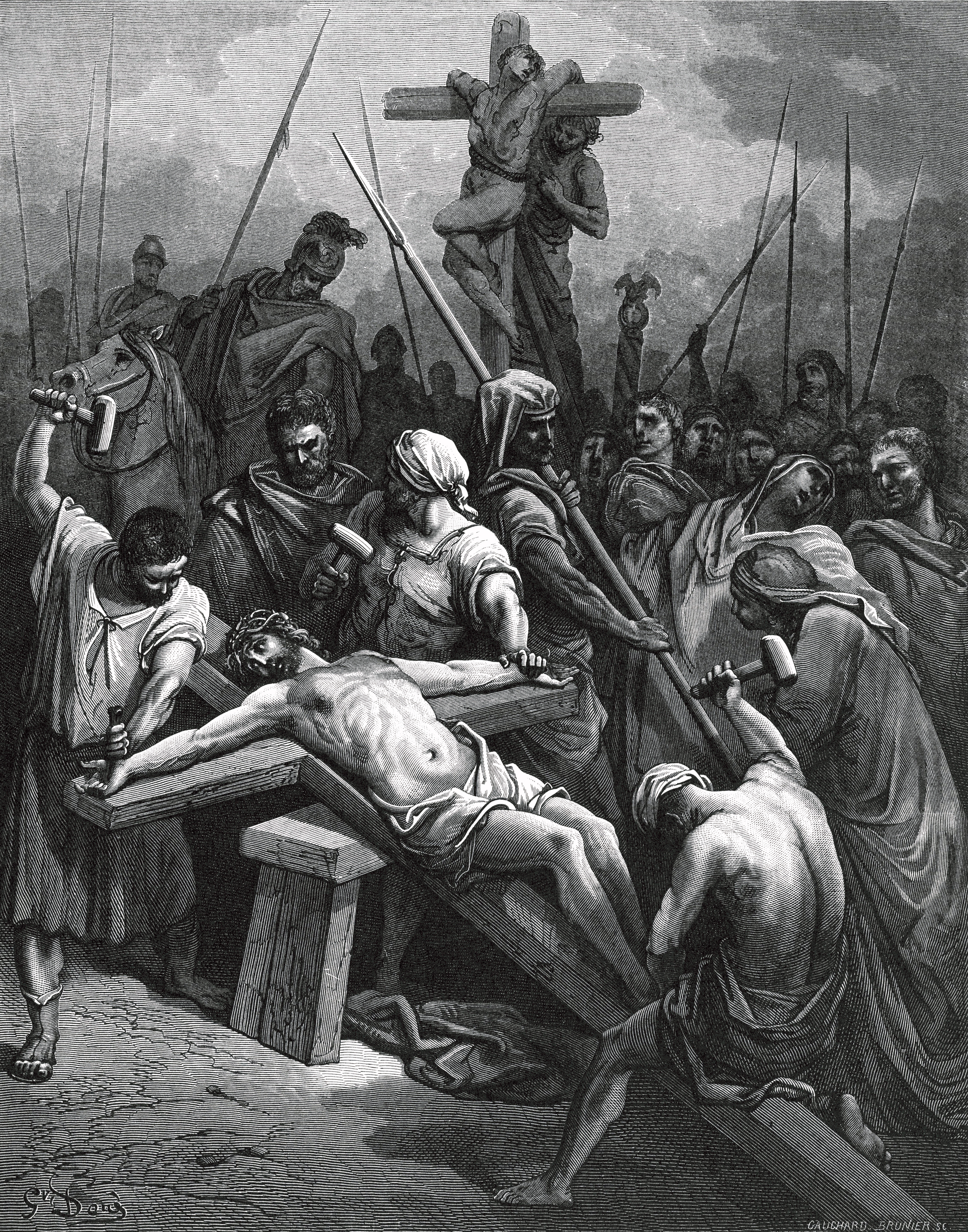
Crucifixion of Jesus on a two-beamed cross, from the Sainte Bible (1866)

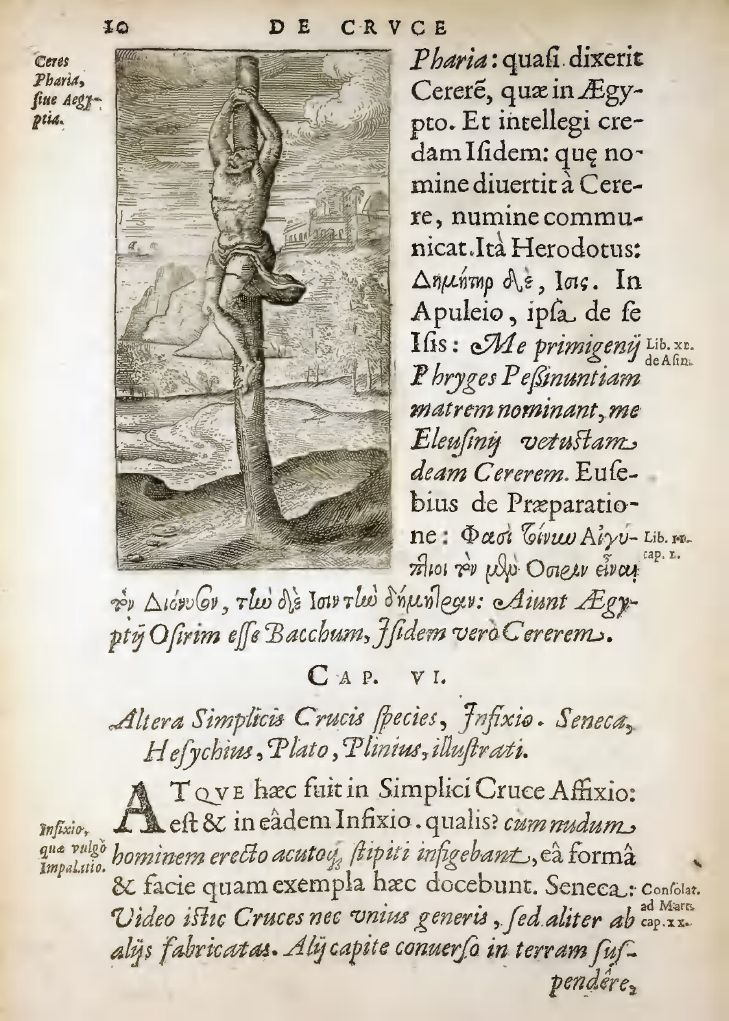
Torture stake, a simple wooden torture stake. Image by Justus Lipsius.

Most Christians believe the gibbet on which Jesus was executed was the traditional two-beamed cross. Jehovah's Witnesses hold the distinctive view that a single upright stake was used. The Greek and Latin words used in the earliest Christian writings are ambiguous. The Koine Greek terms used in the New Testament are stauros (σταυρός) and xylon (ξύλον). The latter means wood (a live tree, timber or an object constructed of wood); in earlier forms of Greek, the former term meant an upright stake or pole, but in Koine Greek it was used also to mean a cross. The Latin word crux was also applied to objects other than a cross.

Early Christian writers who speak of the shape of the particular gibbet on which Jesus died invariably describe it as having a cross-beam. For instance, the Epistle of Barnabas, which was certainly earlier than 135, and may have been of the 1st century AD, the time when the gospel accounts of the death of Jesus were written, likened it to the letter T (the Greek letter tau, which had the numeric value of 300), and to the position assumed by Moses in Exodus 17:11–12. Justin Martyr (100–165) explicitly says the cross of Christ was of two-beam shape: "That lamb which was commanded to be wholly roasted was a symbol of the suffering of the cross which Christ would undergo. For the lamb, which is roasted, is roasted and dressed up in the form of the cross. For one spit is transfixed right through from the lower parts up to the head, and one across the back, to which are attached the legs of the lamb." Irenaeus, who died around the end of the 2nd century, speaks of the cross as having "five extremities, two in length, two in breadth, and one in the middle, on which [last] the person rests who is fixed by the nails."

The assumption of the use of a two-beamed cross does not determine the number of nails used in the crucifixion and some theories suggest three nails while others suggest four nails. Throughout history, larger numbers of nails have been hypothesized, at times as high as 14 nails. These variations are also present in the artistic depictions of the crucifixion. In Western Christianity, before the Renaissance usually four nails would be depicted, with the feet side by side. After the Renaissance most depictions use three nails, with one foot placed on the other. Nails are almost always depicted in art, although Romans sometimes just tied the victims to the cross. The tradition also carries to Christian emblems, e.g. the Jesuits use three nails under the IHS monogram and a cross to symbolize the crucifixion.

The placing of the nails in the hands, or the wrists is also uncertain. Some theories suggest that the Greek word cheir (χείρ) for hand includes the wrist and that the Romans were generally trained to place nails through Destot's space (between the capitate and lunate bones) without fracturing any bones. Another theory suggests that the Greek word for hand also includes the forearm and that the nails were placed near the radius and ulna of the forearm. Ropes may have also been used to fasten the hands in addition to the use of nails.

Another issue of debate has been the use of a hypopodium as a standing platform to support the feet, given that the hands may not have been able to support the weight. In the 17th century Rasmus Bartholin considered a number of analytical scenarios of that topic. In the 20th century, forensic pathologist Frederick Zugibe performed a number of crucifixion experiments by using ropes to hang human subjects at various angles and hand positions. His experiments support an angled suspension, and a two-beamed cross, and perhaps some form of foot support, given that in an Aufbinden form of suspension from a straight stake (as used by the Nazis in the Dachau concentration camp during World War II), death comes rather quickly.

=== Words of Jesus spoken from the cross ===
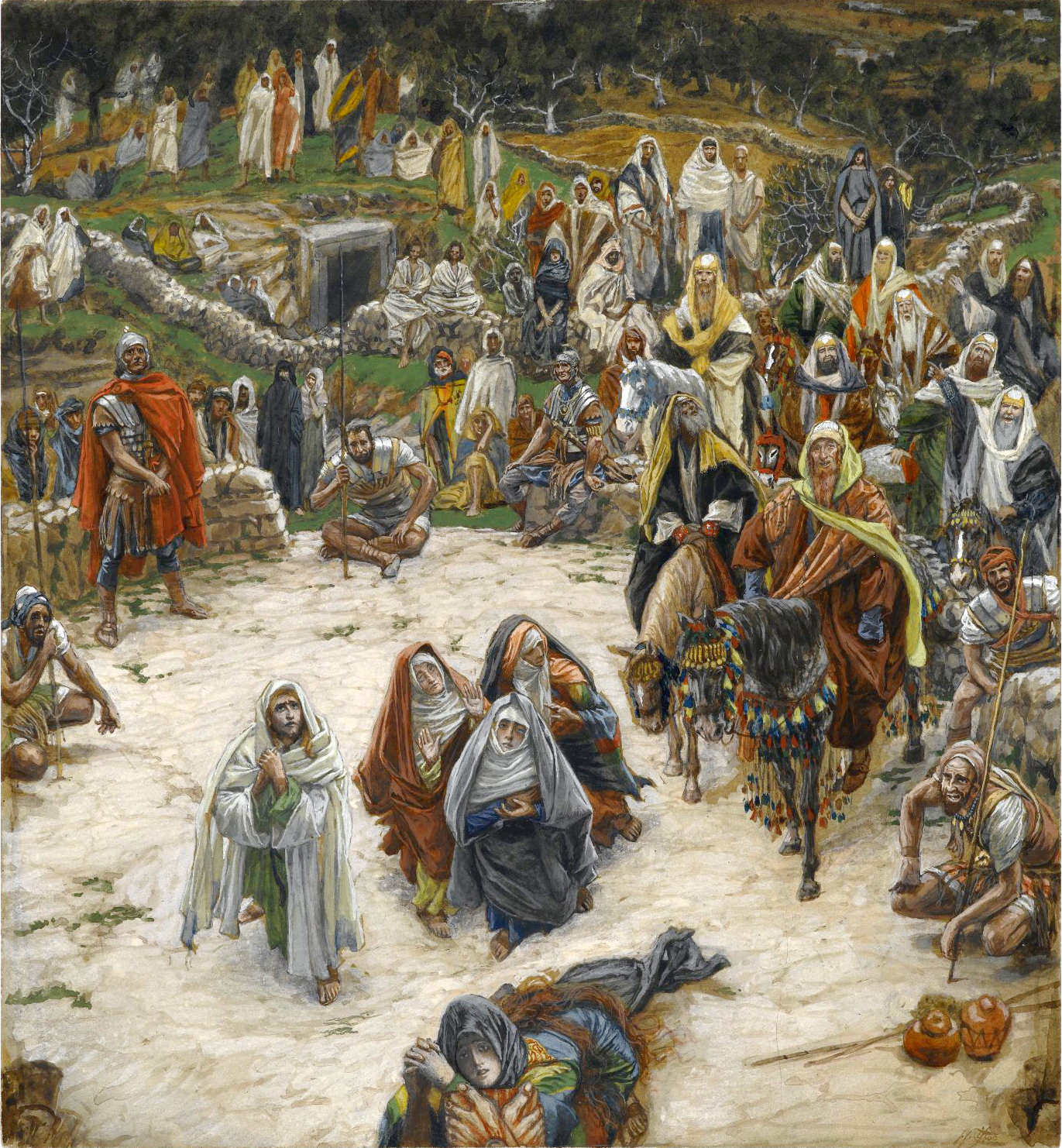
Crucifixion, seen from the Cross, by James Tissot, c. 1890, Brooklyn Museum

The Gospels describe various last words that Jesus said while on the cross, as follows:

==== Mark / Matthew ====
- E′li, E′li, la′ma sa‧bach‧tha′ni? (Aramaic for "My God, My God, why have you forsaken me?"). Aramaic linguist Steve Caruso said Jesus most likely spoke Galilean Aramaic, which would render the pronunciation of these words: əlahí əlahí ləmáh šəvaqtáni.

The only words of Jesus on the cross mentioned in the Mark and Matthew accounts, this is a quotation of Psalm 22. Michael Licona suggests that John has redacted Jesus' authentic statements as recorded in Matthew, Mark and Luke. James Dunn argued in favour of the authenticity of the Mark/Matthew saying as an embarrassment to the early Church and likely not have been invented. Geza Vermes noted the verse is cited in Aramaic rather than the usual Hebrew, and that by the time of Jesus, this phrase had become a proverbial saying in common usage. Compared to the accounts in the other Gospels, which he describes as "theologically correct and reassuring", he considers this phrase to appear genuine, being "unexpected, disquieting and in consequence more probable". Raymond Brown found no persuasive argument against a literal sentiment of feeling forsaken, while according to Allison and Davies Jesus's expression of abandonment by God represents a cry of pain in a difficult circumstance rather a loss of faith, with the following narrative in Matthew showing that God did not forsake Jesus.

==== Luke ====
- "Father, forgive them; for they do not know what they are doing." (Note: This is absent from some of the earliest extant manuscripts.)
- "Truly I tell you, today you will be with me in Paradise."
- "Father, into your hands I commend my spirit."

The Gospel of Luke does not include the aforementioned exclamation of Jesus mentioned in the Matthew and Mark accounts.

==== John ====
- "Woman, here is your son ... Here is your mother."
- "I am thirsty."
- "It is finished."

The words of Jesus on the cross, especially his last words, have been the subject of a wide range of Christian teachings and sermons, and a number of authors have written books specifically devoted to the last sayings of Christ.

=== Reported extraordinary occurrences ===
The synoptics report various miraculous events during the crucifixion. Mark mentions a period of darkness in the daytime during Jesus' crucifixion, and the Temple veil being torn in two when Jesus dies. Luke follows Mark; as does Matthew, additionally mentioning an earthquake and the resurrection of dead saints. No mention of any of these appears in John.

==== Darkness ====
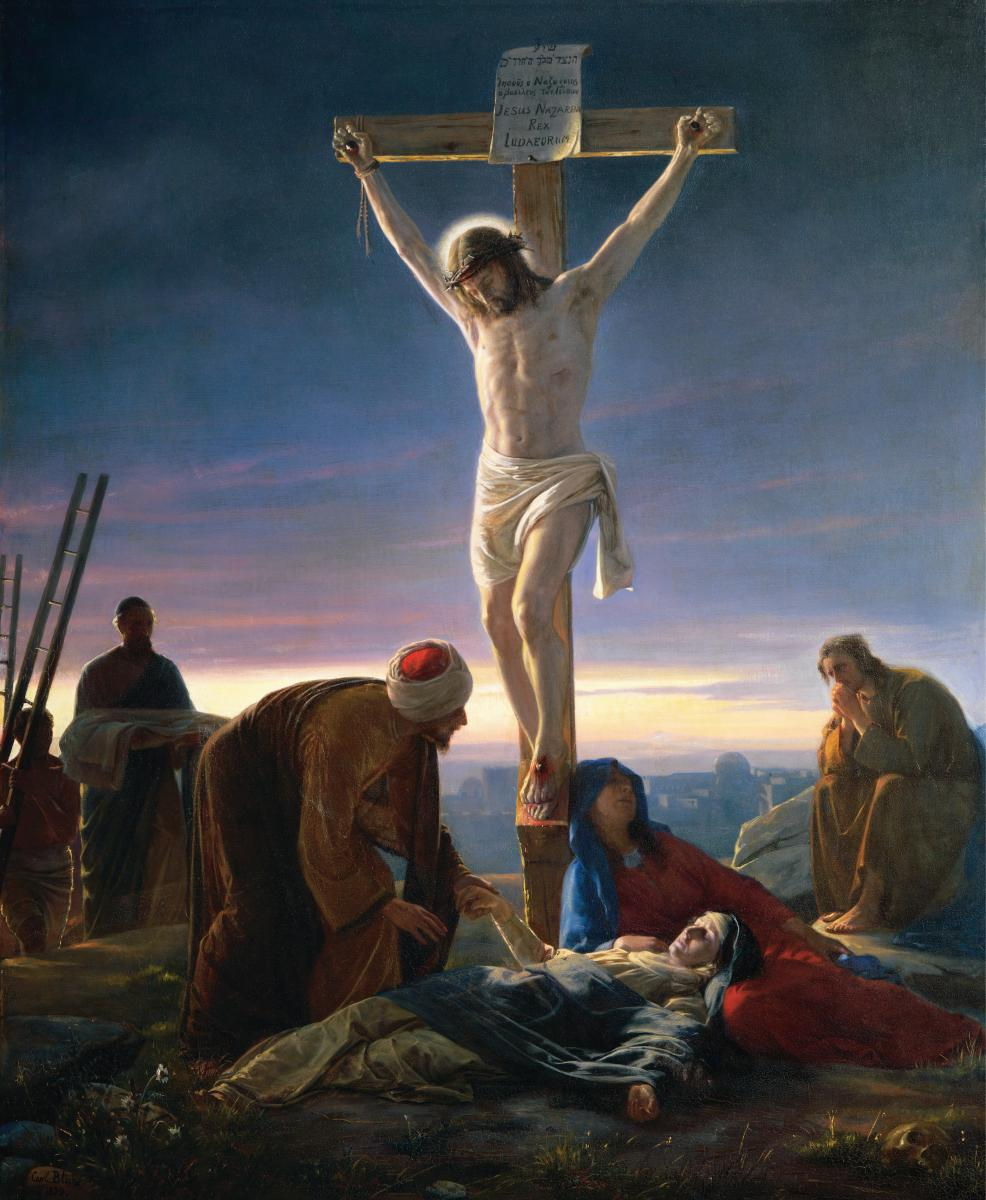
Christ on the Cross, 1870, by Carl Heinrich Bloch, showing the skies darkened

In the synoptic narrative, while Jesus is hanging on the cross, the sky over Judaea (or the whole world) is "darkened for three hours," from the sixth to the ninth hour (noon to mid-afternoon). There is no reference to darkness in the Gospel of John account, in which the crucifixion does not take place until after noon.

Some ancient Christian writers considered the possibility that pagan commentators may have mentioned this event and mistook it for a solar eclipse, pointing out that an eclipse could not occur during the Passover, which takes place during the full moon when the moon is opposite the sun rather than in front of it. Christian traveler and historian Sextus Julius Africanus and Christian theologian Origen refer to Greek historian Phlegon, who lived in the 2nd century AD, as having written "with regard to the eclipse in the time of Tiberius Caesar, in whose reign Jesus appears to have been crucified, and the great earthquakes which then took place".

Sextus Julius Africanus further refers to the writings of historian Thallus: "This darkness Thallus, in the third book of his History, calls, as appears to me without reason, an eclipse of the sun. For the Hebrews celebrate the Passover on the 14th day according to the moon, and the passion of our Saviour falls on the day before the Passover; but an eclipse of the sun takes place only when the moon comes under the sun." Christian apologist Tertullian believed the event was documented in the Roman archives.

Colin Humphreys and Graeme Waddington of Oxford University considered the possibility that a lunar, rather than solar, eclipse might have taken place. They concluded that such an eclipse was visible in Jerusalem on the date of April 3, AD 33, that its peak was at 5:15 pm Jerusalem time, but that it was visible after sundown (the beginning of the Sabbath and of Passover) for half an hour. Some of the oldest manuscripts of Luke say "the sun was eclipsed" (23:45) at the time of the crucifixion. The authors suggest that this may be due to a scribe changing the word "moon" to "sun" to explain the darkness, or else that the word "eclipsed" just meant darkened or hidden, as in a passage of the Sibylline Oracles. Historian David Henige dismisses Humphreys' and Waddington's scribal editing explanation as "indefensible". More objectively, astronomer Bradley Schaefer later found that the lunar eclipse would not have been visible at moonrise due to the brightness of the sky, and the umbra (the part that would be red) would not have been visible before it disappeared a few minutes later.

In an edition of the BBC Radio 4 program In Our Time entitled "Eclipses", Frank Close, Emeritus Professor of Physics at Oxford University, noted that certain historical sources say that on the night of the Crucifixion "the moon had risen blood red," indicating a lunar eclipse. He further confirmed that, as Passover occurs on a full moon, calculations show that a lunar eclipse did in fact take place on the night of Passover, Friday, 3 April AD 33, and would have been visible in the region of modern Israel, ancient Judaea, just after sunset.

Modern biblical scholarship treats the account in the Synoptic Gospels as a literary creation by the author of the Mark Gospel, amended in the Luke and Matthew accounts, intended to heighten the importance of what they saw as a theologically significant event, and not intended to be taken literally. This image of darkness over the land would have been understood by ancient readers, a typical element in the description of the death of kings and other major figures by writers such as Philo, Dio Cassius, Virgil, Plutarch and Josephus. Géza Vermes describes the darkness account as typical of "Jewish eschatological imagery of the day of the Lord", and says that those interpreting it as a datable eclipse are "barking up the wrong tree".

==== Temple veil, earthquake and resurrection of dead saints ====
The synoptic gospels state that the veil of the temple was torn from top to bottom.

The Gospel of Matthew mentions an account of earthquakes, rocks splitting, and the opening of the graves of dead saints, and describes how these resurrected saints went into the holy city and appeared to many people.

In the Mark and Matthew accounts, the centurion in charge comments on the events: "Truly this man was the Son of God!" or "Truly this was the Son of God!". The Gospel of Luke quotes him as saying, "Certainly this man was innocent!"

The historian Sextus Julius Africanus in the early-3rd century wrote, describing the day of the crucifixion, "A most terrible darkness fell over all the world, the rocks were torn apart by an earthquake, and many places both in Judaea and the rest of the world were thrown down. In the third book of his Histories, Thallos dismisses this darkness as a solar eclipse. ..."

A widespread earthquake of magnitude at least 5.5 has been confirmed to have taken place in the region between AD 26 and 36. This earthquake was dated by counting varves (annual layers of sediment) between the disruptions in a core of sediment from En Gedi caused by it and by an earlier known quake in 31 BC. The authors concluded that either this was the earthquake in Matthew and it occurred more or less as reported, or else Matthew "borrowed" this earthquake which actually occurred at another time or simply inserted an "allegorical fiction".

== Medical aspects ==
A number of theories to explain the circumstances of the death of Jesus on the cross have been proposed by physicians and Biblical scholars. In 2006, Matthew W. Maslen and Piers D. Mitchell reviewed over 40 publications on the subject with theories ranging from cardiac rupture to pulmonary embolism.

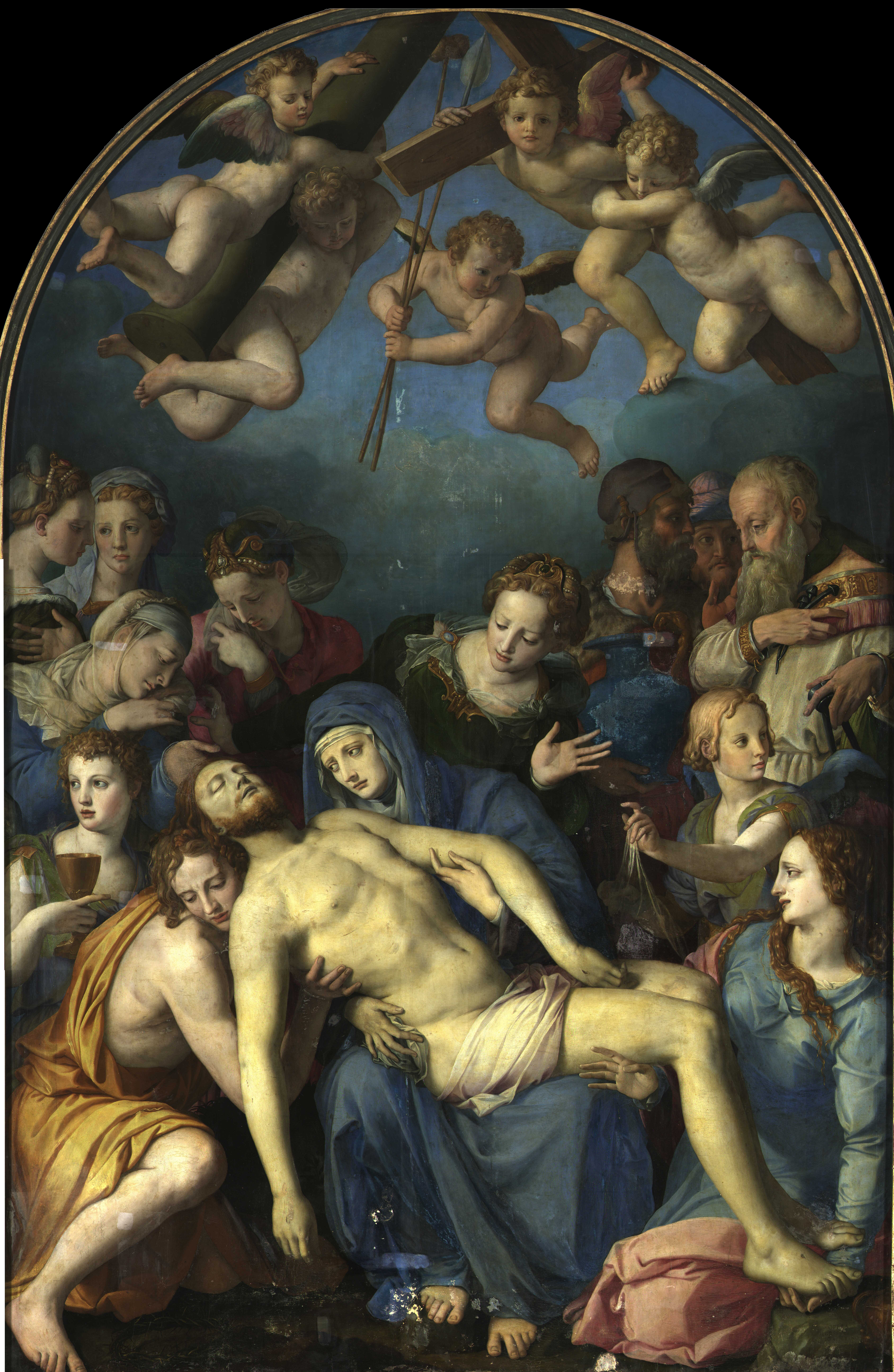
Bronzino's Deposition of Christ, c. 1544

In 1847, physician William Stroud proposed the ruptured heart theory as the cause of Jesus' death, drawing on the reference in the Gospel of John (John 19:34) to blood and water flowing from his side when pierced with a spear; this early theory went on to influence a number of others.

The cardiovascular collapse theory is a prevalent modern explanation that proposes that Jesus died of profound shock. According to this theory, the scourging, the beatings, and the nailing to the cross left Jesus dehydrated, weak, and critically ill and this led to cardiovascular collapse.

In 1986, physician William Edwards and his colleagues, writing in the Journal of the American Medical Association, supported the combined cardiovascular collapse (via hypovolemic shock) and exhaustion asphyxia theories, interpreting the flow of water from Jesus' side described in the Gospel of John was pericardial fluid.

In his book The Crucifixion of Jesus, physician and forensic pathologist Frederick Zugibe studied the likely circumstances of the death of Jesus in great detail. Zugibe carried out a number of experiments over several years to test his theories while he was a medical examiner. These studies included experiments in which volunteers with specific weights were hanging at specific angles and the amount of pull on each hand was measured, in cases where the feet were also secured or not. In these cases the amount of pull and the corresponding pain was found to be significant.

Pierre Barbet, a French physician, and the chief surgeon at Saint Joseph's Hospital in Paris, hypothesized that Jesus relaxed his muscles to obtain enough air to utter his last words, in the face of exhaustion asphyxia. Some of Barbet's theories, such as the location of nails, are disputed by Zugibe.

Orthopedic surgeon Keith Maxwell not only analyzed the medical aspects of the crucifixion, but also considered the physical strain involved in Jesus carrying the cross along the Via Dolorosa.

In 2003, historians F. P. Retief and L. Cilliers reviewed the history and pathology of crucifixion as performed by the Romans and suggested that the cause of death was often a combination of factors. They also state that Roman guards were prohibited from leaving the scene until death had occurred.

== Theological significance ==
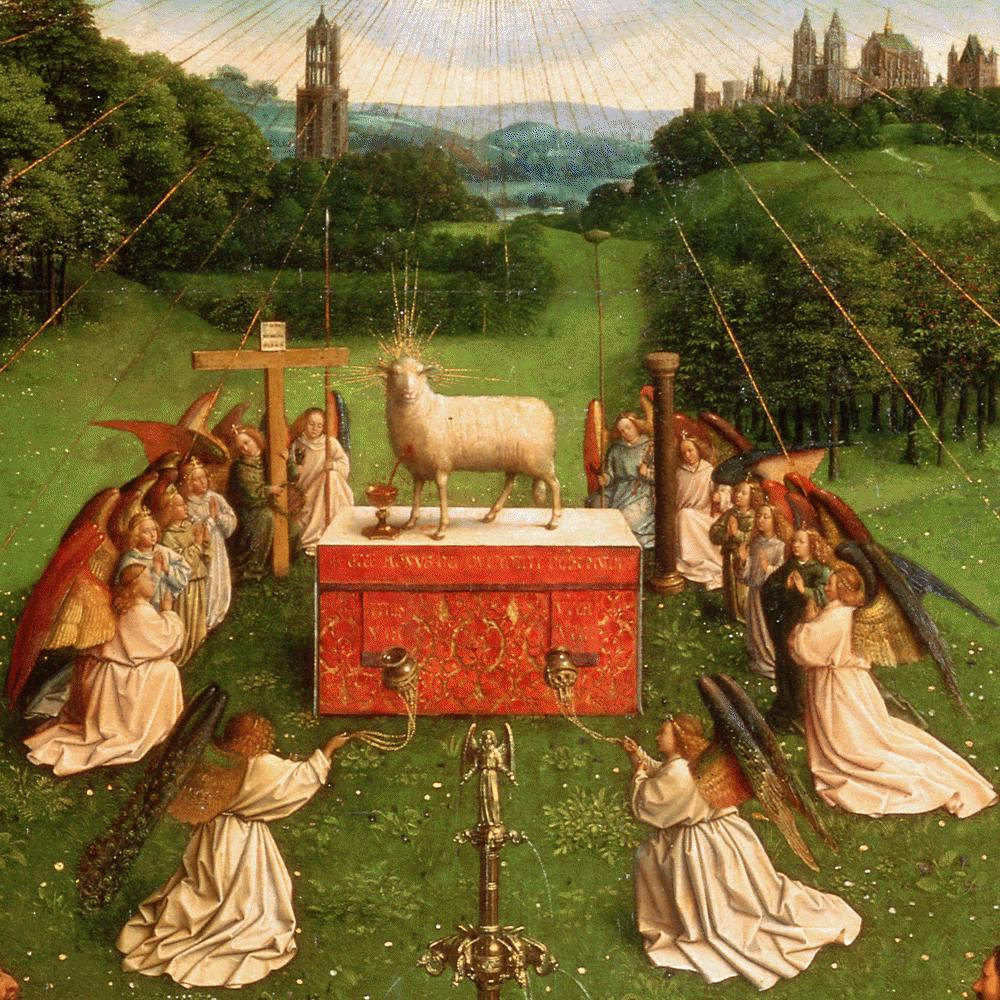
Adoration of the Mystic Lamb (detail of the Ghent Altarpiece, Jan van Eyck, c. 1432). Christ is represented as the sacrificial Lamb of God.

Christians believe that Jesus' death was instrumental in restoring humankind to relationship with God. Christians believe that through Jesus' death and resurrection, people may be reconciled with God and receive both joy and power in this life and eternal life. Thus the crucifixion of Jesus along with his resurrection restores access to a vibrant experience of God's presence, love and grace as well as the confidence of eternal life.

=== Christology ===
The accounts of the crucifixion and subsequent resurrection of Jesus provide a rich background for Christological analysis, from the canonical Gospels to the Pauline epistles. Christians believe Jesus' suffering was foretold in the Old Testament, such as in Psalm 22, and Isaiah 53 prophecy of the suffering servant.

In Johannine "agent Christology" the submission of Jesus to crucifixion is a sacrifice made as an agent of God or servant of God, for the sake of eventual victory. This builds on the salvific theme of the Gospel of John which begins in John 1:29 with John the Baptist's proclamation: "The Lamb of God who takes away the sins of the world".

A central element in the Christology presented in the Acts of the Apostles is the affirmation of the belief that the death of Jesus by crucifixion happened "with the foreknowledge of God, according to a definite plan". In this view, as in Acts 2:23, the cross is not viewed as a scandal, for the crucifixion of Jesus "at the hands of the lawless" is viewed as the fulfillment of the plan of God.

Paul's Christology has a specific focus on the death and resurrection of Jesus. For Paul, the crucifixion of Jesus is directly related to his resurrection and the term "the cross of Christ" used in Galatians 6:12 may be viewed as his abbreviation of the message of the gospels. For Paul, the crucifixion of Jesus was not an isolated event in history, but a cosmic event with significant eschatological consequences, as in 1 Corinthians 2:8. In the Pauline view, Jesus, obedient to the point of death (Philippians 2:8) died "at the right time" (Romans 4:25) based on the plan of God. For Paul the "power of the cross" is not separable from the resurrection of Jesus. Furthermore, Paul highlighted the idea that Jesus on the cross defeated the spiritual forces of evil "Kosmokrator", literally 'the rulers of this world' (used in plural in Ephesians 6:12), thus highlighting the idea of victory of light over darkness, or good over evil, through Jesus.

Belief in the redemptive nature of Jesus' death predates the Pauline epistles, to the earliest days of Christianity and the Church of Jerusalem. The Nicene Creed's statement that "for our sake he was crucified" is a reflection of this core belief's formalization in the 4th century.

John Calvin supported the "agent of God" Christology and argued that in his trial in Pilate's Court Jesus could have successfully argued for his innocence, but instead submitted to crucifixion in obedience to the Father. This Christological theme continued into the 20th century, both in the Eastern and Western Christianity. In Eastern Christianity, Sergei Bulgakov argued, the crucifixion of Jesus was "pre-eternally" determined by the Father before the creation of the world, to redeem humanity from the disgrace caused by the fall of Adam. In Western Christianity, Karl Rahner elaborated on the analogy that the blood of the Lamb of God (and the water from the side of Jesus) shed at the crucifixion had a cleansing nature, similar to baptismal water.

=== Atonement ===
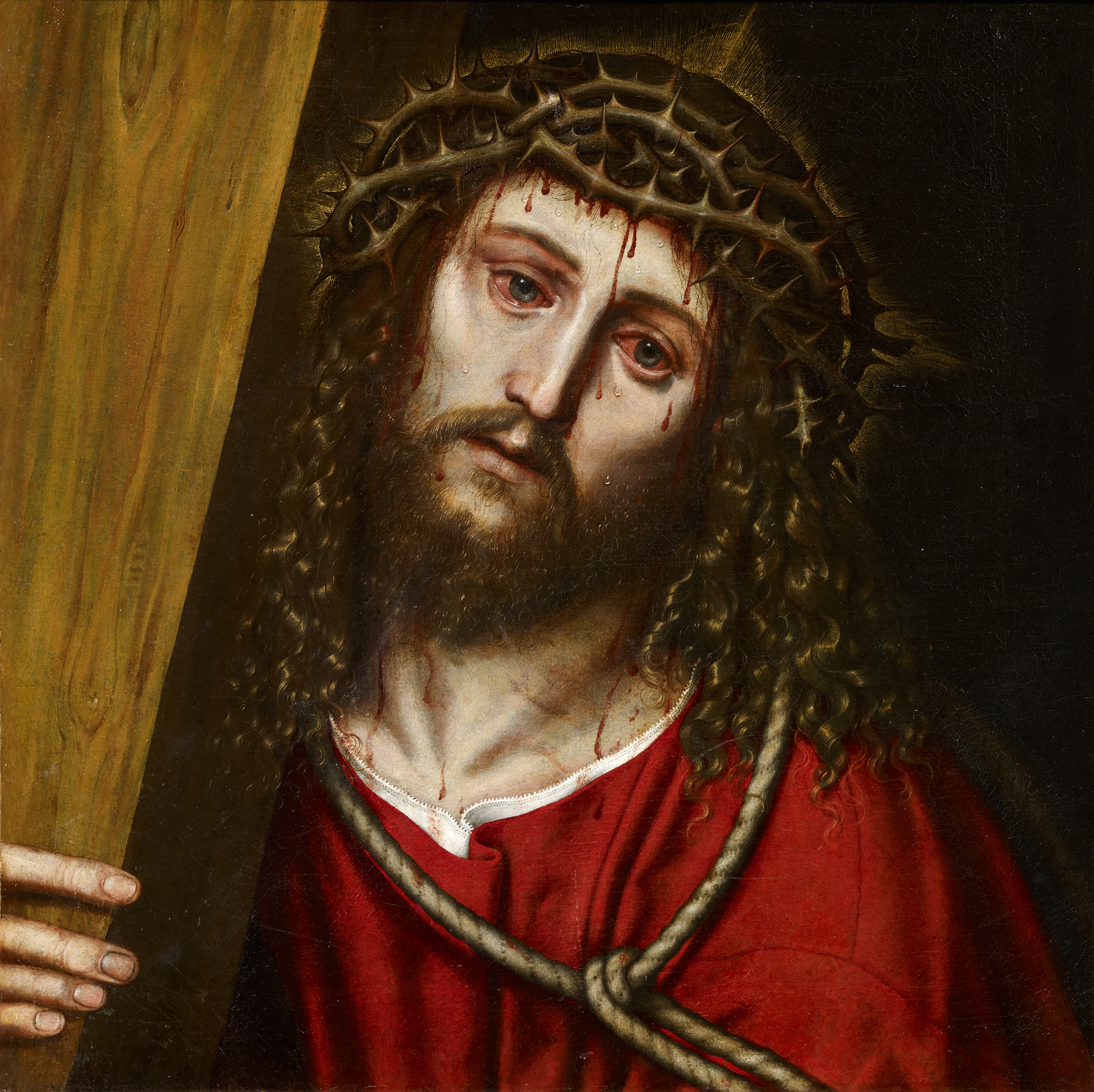
Penitent by Niccolò Frangipane, 1574

Jesus' death and resurrection underpin a variety of theological interpretations as to how salvation is granted to humanity. These interpretations vary widely in how much emphasis they place on the death and resurrection as compared to Jesus' words. According to the substitutionary atonement view, Jesus' death is of central importance, and Jesus willingly sacrificed himself after his resurrection as an act of perfect obedience as a sacrifice of love which pleased God. By contrast, the moral influence theory of atonement focuses much more on the moral content of Jesus' teaching, and sees Jesus' death as a martyrdom. Since the Middle Ages there has been conflict between these two views within Western Christianity. Evangelical Protestants typically hold a substitutionary view and in particular hold to the theory of penal substitution. Liberal Protestants typically reject substitutionary atonement and hold to the moral influence theory of atonement. Both views are popular within the Roman Catholic Church, with the satisfaction doctrine incorporated into the idea of penance.

In the Roman Catholic tradition this view of atonement is balanced by the duty of Roman Catholics to perform the Acts of Reparation to Jesus Christ which in the encyclical Miserentissimus Redemptor of Pope Pius XI were defined as "some sort of compensation to be rendered for the injury" with respect to the sufferings of Jesus. Pope John Paul II referred to these acts of reparation as the "unceasing effort to stand beside the endless crosses on which the Son of God continues to be crucified."

Among Eastern Orthodox Christians, another common view is Christus Victor. This holds that Jesus was sent by God to defeat death and Satan. Because of his perfection, voluntary death, and resurrection, Jesus defeated Satan and death, and arose victorious. Therefore, humanity was no longer bound in sin, but was free to rejoin God through the repentance of sin and faith in Jesus.

The Church of Jesus Christ of Latter-day Saints teaches that the crucifixion of Jesus was part of the atonement and a "redeeming ransom" both for the effect of the fall of Adam upon all humankind and "for the personal sins of all who repent, from Adam to the end of the world."

=== Deicide ===
Through most of its history, the mainstream Christian intellectual tradition blames the Jews at the time and forever for the crucifixion of Jesus. This blame is incorrect as an established historical fact. The Gospels shifted blame from Roman gentiles to the Jews as a way to explain away their rejection of the divinity of Jesus and to make Christianity more palatable to gentiles. According to Lüdemann, this claim "can still be heard and is not sufficiently contradicted."

==== Catholic view ====
Since the 4th century, the Church's attitude, mainly rooted in the teachings of Augustine and Aquinas, had been that the covenant between God and the Jews had been nullified by the latters' failure of recognising Jesus as the messiah and by them committing deicide. At the Council of Trent (1545-1563), held during the Counter-Reformation, a new so-called Tridentine Catechism was adopted which, while acknowledging that the Jews had historically crucified Jesus, at the same time taught that the main reason for the crucifixion was the entirety of the sins of humanity, with those committed by Christians being more severe since they knew and had accepted the teachings of Jesus Christ. The Second Vatican Council took a further step through its 1965 declaration known as "Nostra Aetate", freeing all Jews, both those contemporary to Jesus and those belonging to the generations since, of any common or individual guilt for his Passion, while only mentioning that "the Jewish authorities and those following their lead pressed for the death of Christ" at his trial. Since the Second Vatican Council, the Catholic Church denounces the idea of Jewish deicide, believing that all sinners are the authors and ministers of Jesus' crucifixion, and admonishes Christians that their own guilt is greater when they sin with knowledge of Jesus, than when others sin without it.

== Denial ==
=== Docetism ===
Historically, in Christianity, Docetism was the doctrine that the phenomenon of Jesus, his historical and bodily existence, and above all the human form of Jesus, was mere semblance without any true reality. Docetists denied that Jesus could have truly suffered and died, as his physical body was illusory, and instead saw the crucifixion as something that only appeared to happen.

=== Nag Hammadi manuscripts ===
According to the First Revelation of James in the Nag Hammadi library, Jesus appeared to James after apparently being crucified and stated that another person had been inflicted in his place:

The master appeared to him. He stopped praying, embraced him, and kissed him, saying, "Rabbi, I've found you. I heard of the sufferings you endured, and I was greatly troubled. You know my compassion. Because of this I wished, as I reflected upon it, that I would never see these people again. They must be judged for what they have done, for what they have done is not right." The master said, "James, do not be concerned for me or these people. I am the one who was within me. Never did I suffer at all, and I was not distressed. These people did not harm me. Rather, all this was inflicted upon a figure of the rulers, and it was fitting that this figure should be [destroyed] by them."

=== Islam ===
Most Islamic traditions categorically deny that Jesus physically died, either on a cross or another manner. This denial is asserted in the Quran, which states:

And [for] their saying, "Indeed, we have killed the Messiah, Jesus the son of Mary, the messenger of Allah." And they did not kill him, nor did they crucify him; but rather, it was made to appear to them so. And indeed, those who differ over it are in doubt about it. They have no knowledge of it except the following of assumption. And they did not kill him, for certain. (157) Rather, Allah raised him to Himself. And ever is Allah Exalted in Might and Wise. (158)

— Quran 4:157–158

Islamic traditions teach that Jesus ascended to Heaven without being put on the cross, but that God transformed another person to appear exactly like him and to be then crucified instead of him. An ancient antecedent of this view is attested in an account by Irenaeus of the doctrine of the 2nd-century Alexandrian Gnostic Basilides, in which Irenaeus refutes what he believes to be a heresy denying the death.

=== Gnosticism ===
Some scriptures identified as Gnostic reject the atonement of Jesus' death by distinguishing the earthly body of Jesus and his divine and immaterial essence. According to the Second Treatise of the Great Seth, Yaldabaoth (the Creator of the material universe) and his Archons tried to kill Jesus by crucifixion, but only killed their own man (that is the body). While Jesus ascended from his body, Yaldabaoth and his followers thought Jesus to be dead. In Apocalypse of Peter, Peter talks with the savior whom the "priests and people" believed to have killed.

Manichaeism, which was influenced by Gnostic ideas, adhered to the idea that not Jesus, but somebody else was crucified instead. Jesus suffering on the cross is depicted as the state of light particles (spirit) within matter instead.

According to Bogomilism, the crucifixion was an attempt by Lucifer to destroy Jesus, while the earthly Jesus was regarded as a prophet, Jesus himself was an immaterial being that can not be killed. Accordingly, Lucifer failed and Jesus' sufferings on the cross were only an illusion.

=== Others ===
According to some Christian sects in Japan, Jesus Christ did not die on the cross at Golgotha. Instead his younger brother, Isukiri, took his place on the cross, while Jesus fled across Siberia to Mutsu Province, in northern Japan. Once in Japan, he became a rice farmer, married, and raised a family with three daughters near what is now Shingō. While in Japan, it is asserted that he traveled, learned, and eventually died at the age of 106. His body was exposed on a hilltop for four years. According to the customs of the time, Jesus' bones were collected, bundled, and buried in a mound. There is also a museum in Japan which claims to have evidence of these claims.

In Yazidism, Jesus is thought of as a "figure of light" who could not be crucified. This interpretation could be either taken from the Quran or Gnostics.

== In art, symbolism and devotions ==
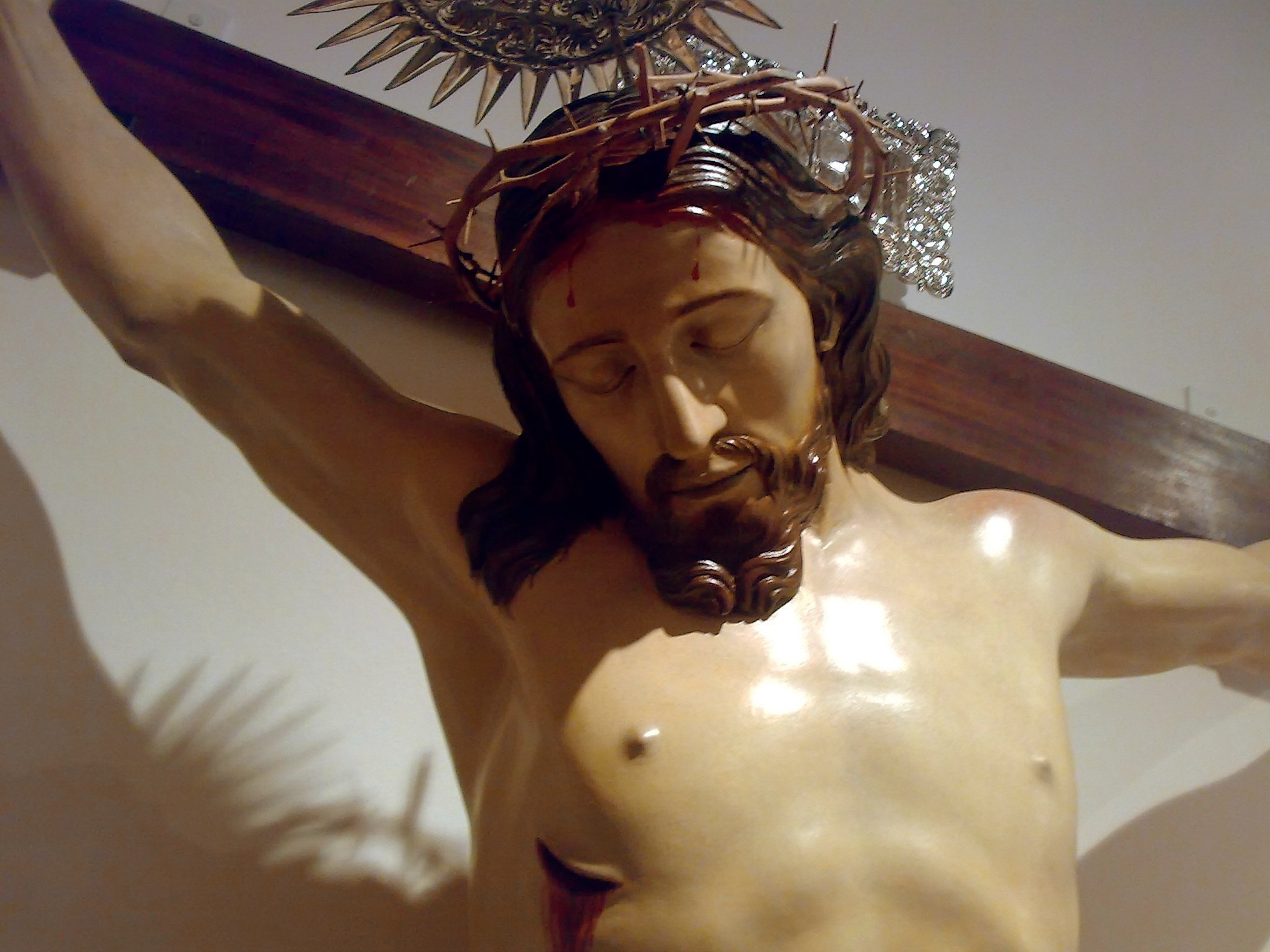
Detail of the countenance of Christ just dead, by José Luján Pérez, 1793, Las Palmas Cathedral

Since the crucifixion of Jesus, the cross has become a key element of Christian symbolism, and the crucifixion scene has been a key element of Christian art, giving rise to specific artistic themes such as Christ Carrying the Cross, raising of the Cross, Stabat Mater, Descent from the Cross and Lamentation of Christ.

The symbolism of the cross which is today one of the most widely recognized Christian symbols was used from the earliest Christian times. Justin Martyr, who died in 165, describes it in a way that already implies its use as a symbol, although the crucifix appeared later.

Devotions based on the process of crucifixion, and the sufferings of Jesus are followed by various Christians. The Stations of the Cross follows a number of stages based on the stages involved in the crucifixion of Jesus, while the Rosary of the Holy Wounds is used to meditate on the wounds of Jesus as part of the crucifixion.

Masters such as Giotto, Fra Angelico, Masaccio, Raphael, Botticelli, van Dyck, Titian, Caravaggio, El Greco, Zurbarán, Velázquez, Rubens and Rembrandt have all depicted the crucifixion scene in their works. The Crucifixion, seen from the Cross by Tissot presented a novel approach at the end of the 19th century, in which the crucifixion scene was portrayed from the perspective of Jesus.

The presence of the Virgin Mary under the cross, mentioned in the Gospel of John, has in itself been the subject of Marian art, and well known Catholic symbolism such as the Miraculous Medal and Pope John Paul II's Coat of Arms bearing a Marian Cross. And a number of Marian devotions also involve the presence of the Virgin Mary in Calvary, e.g., Pope John Paul II stated that "Mary was united to Jesus on the Cross". Well known works of Christian art by masters such as Raphael (the Mond Crucifixion), and Caravaggio (The Entombment of Christ) depict the Virgin Mary as part of the crucifixion scene.

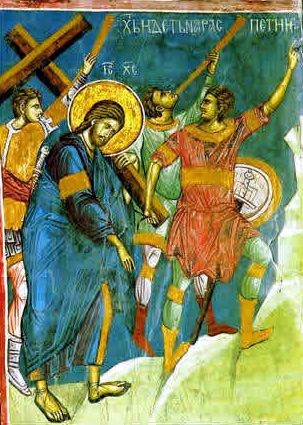
Carrying the Cross fresco, Decani monastery, Kosovo, 14th century

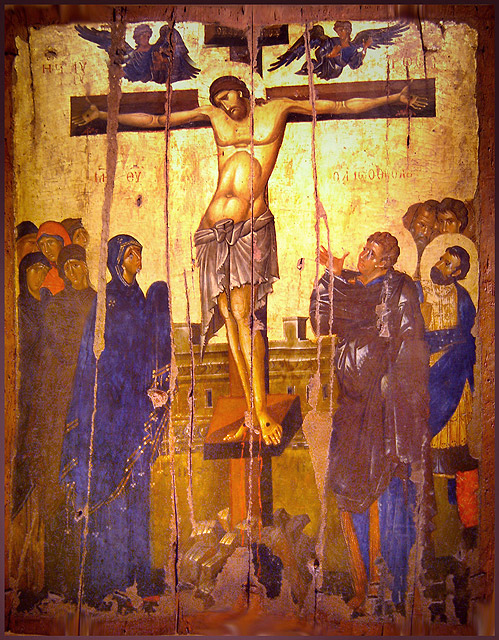
Orthodox Crucifixion icon, Athens, Greece

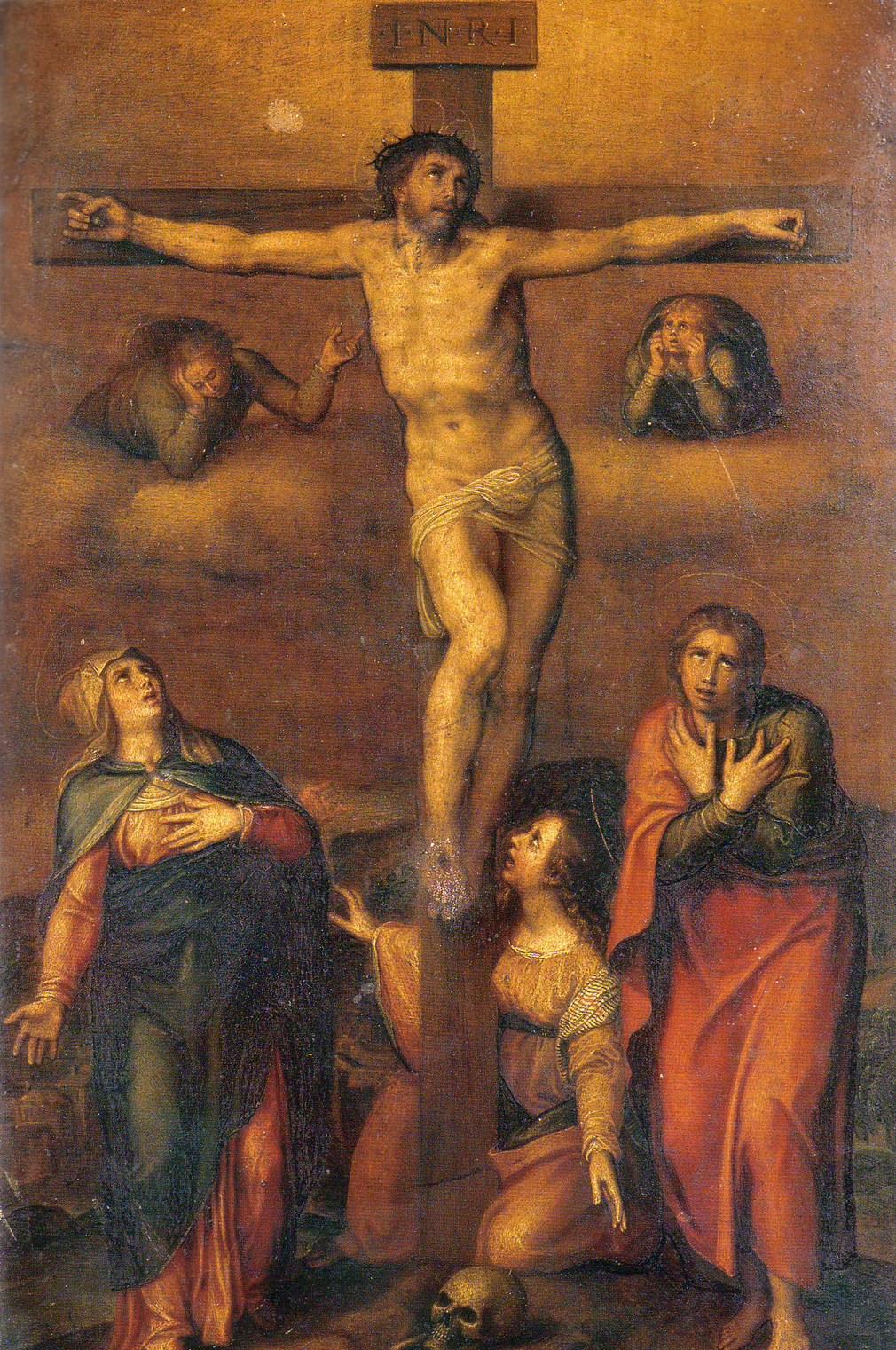
Crucifixion of Christ, Michelangelo, 1540

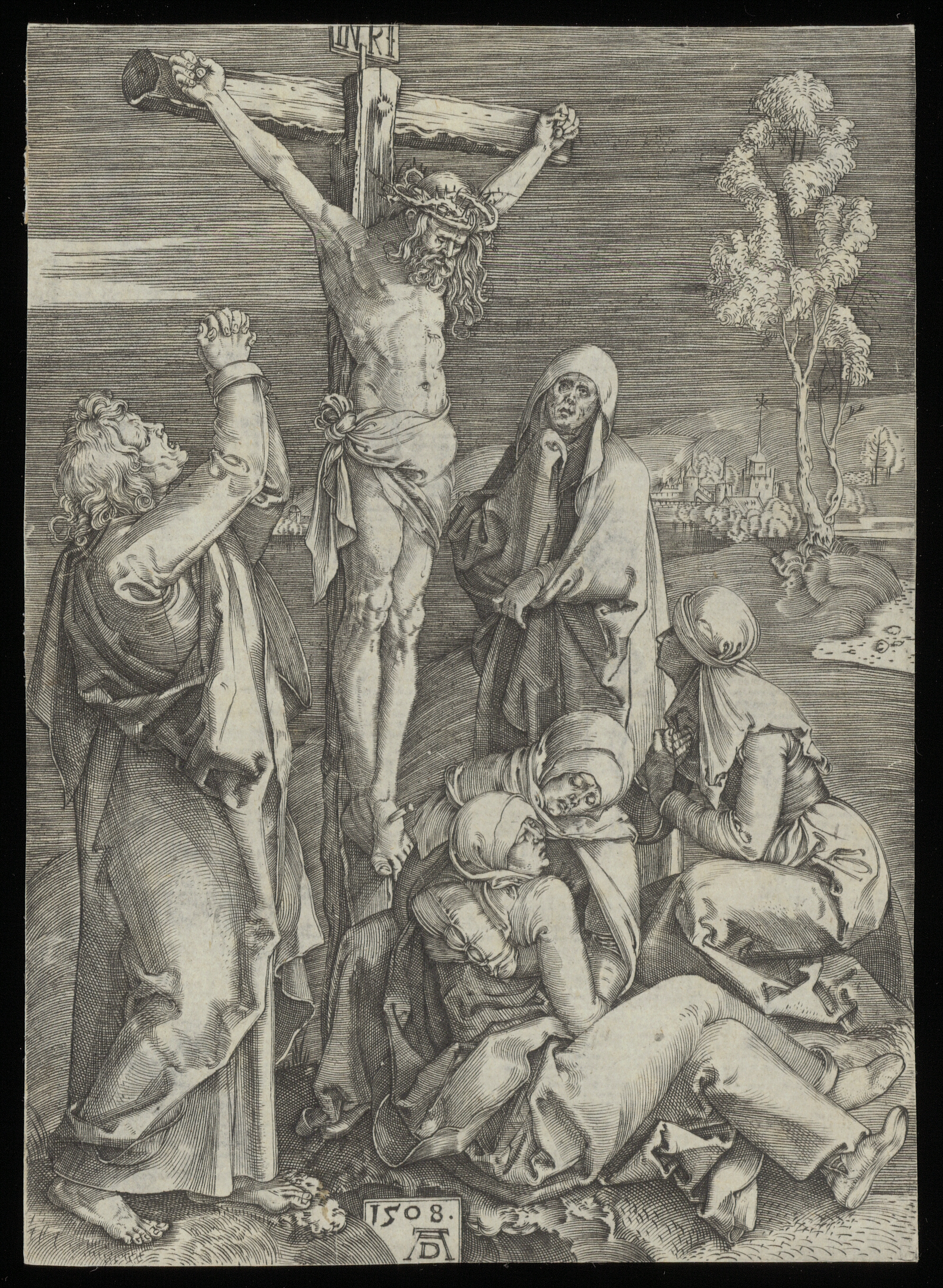
Print of Albrecht Dürer's Die Kreuzigung, printed at the end of the 16th century

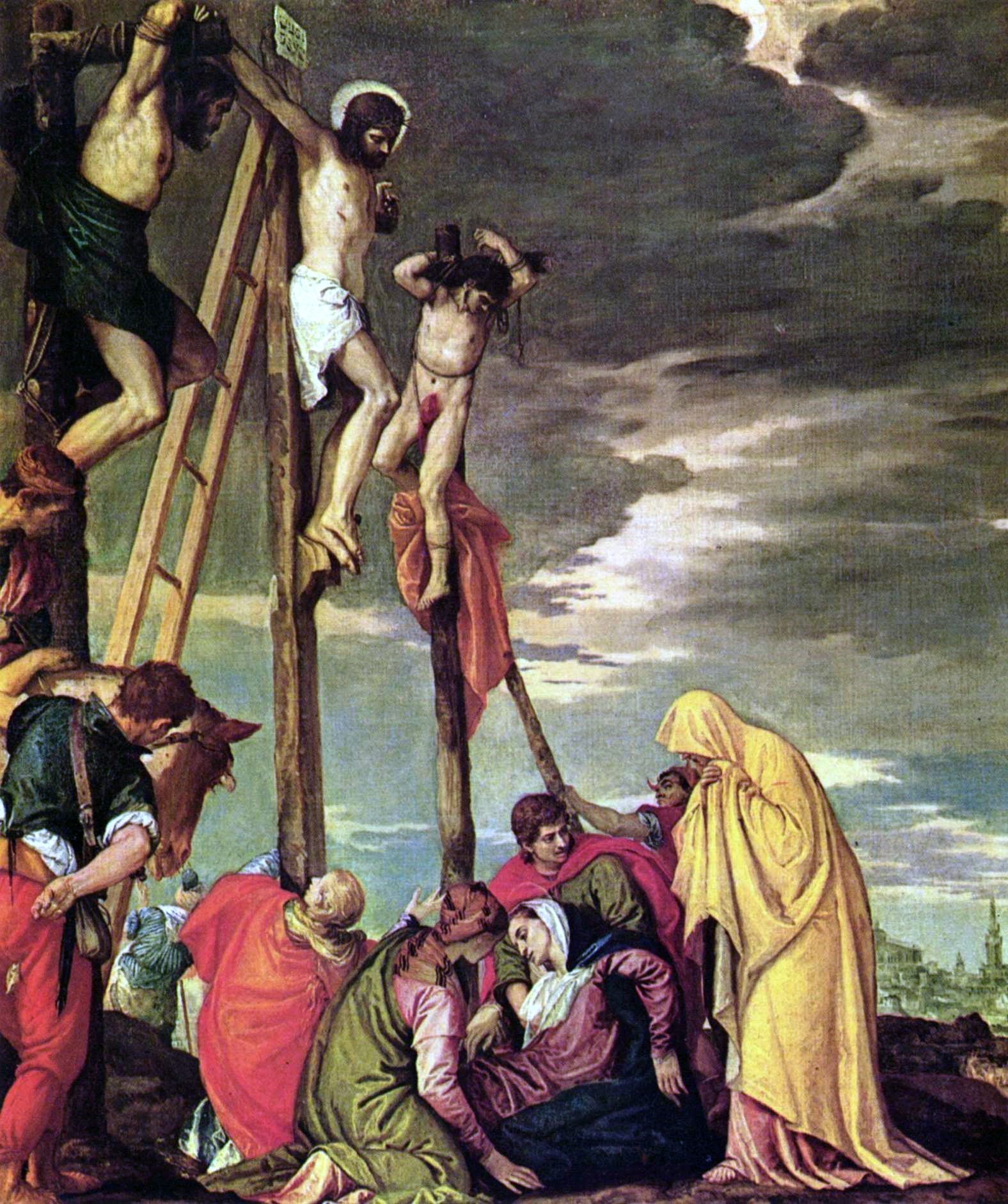
Calvary by Paolo Veronese, 16th century

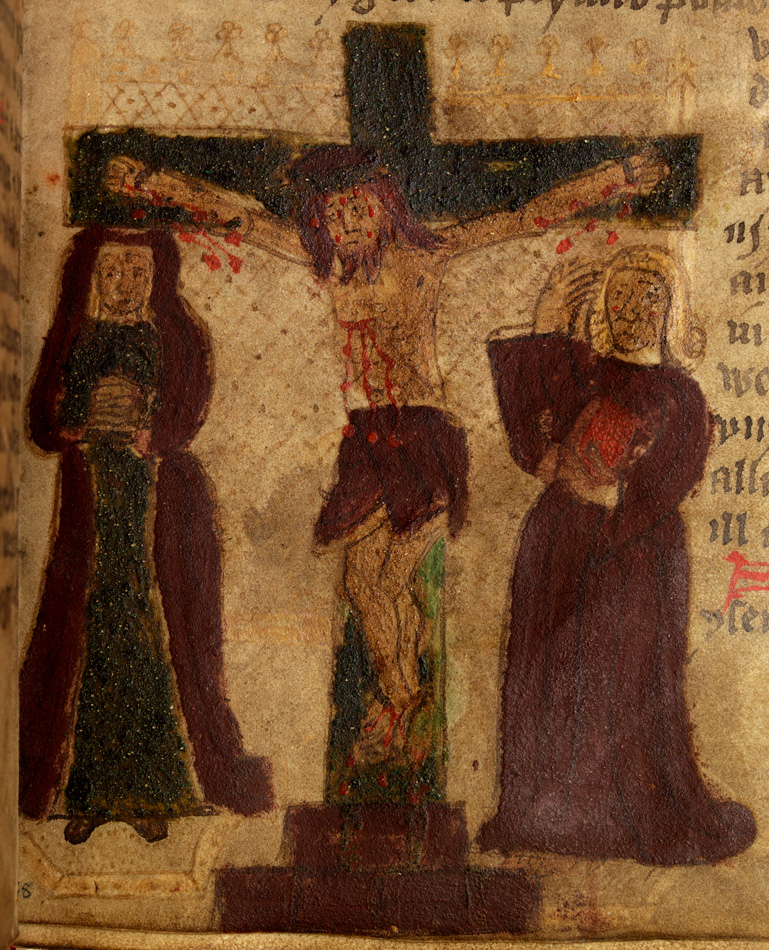
From a 14th–15th century Welsh manuscript

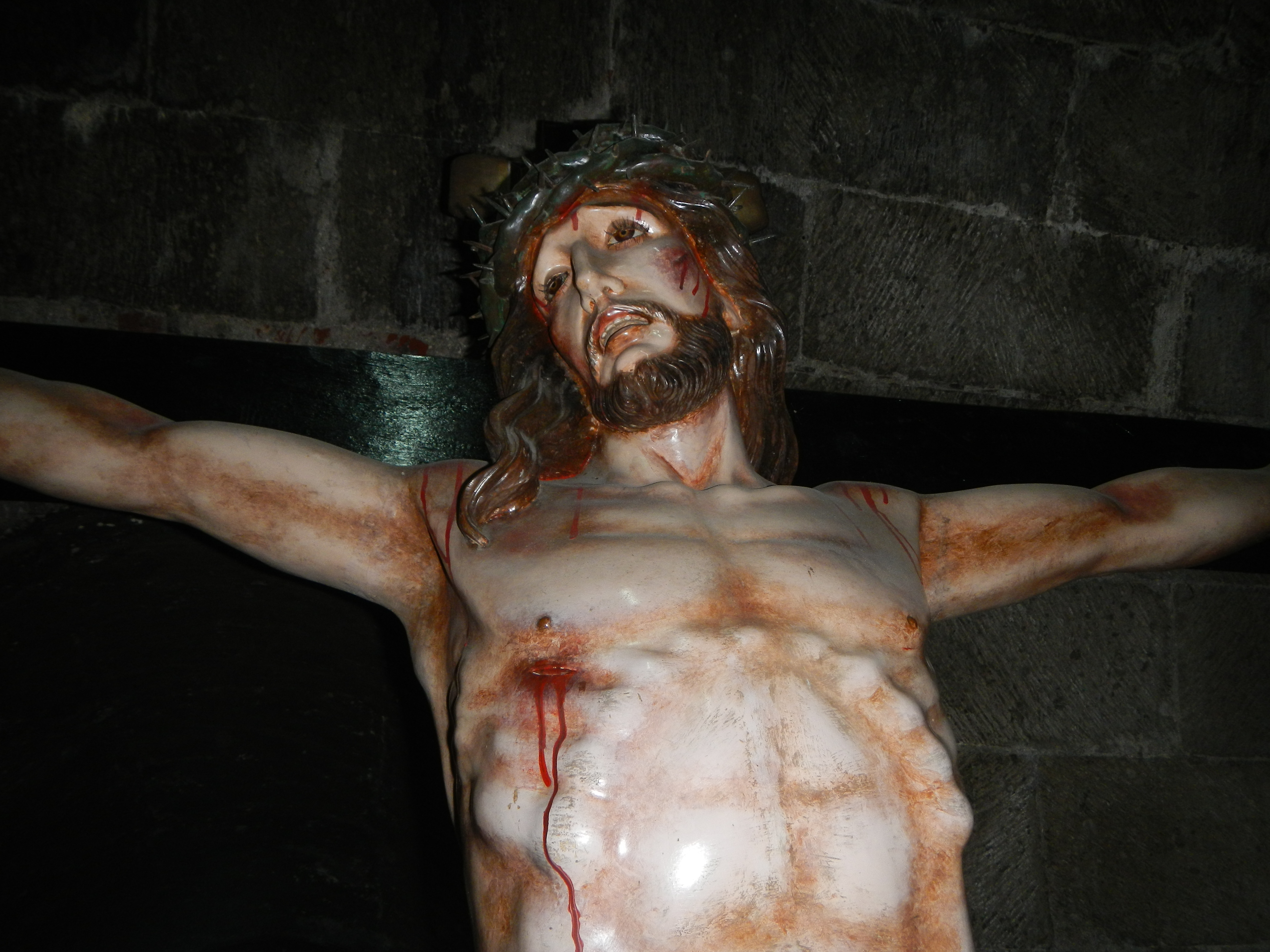
Crucifix of Taguig Church, Philippines

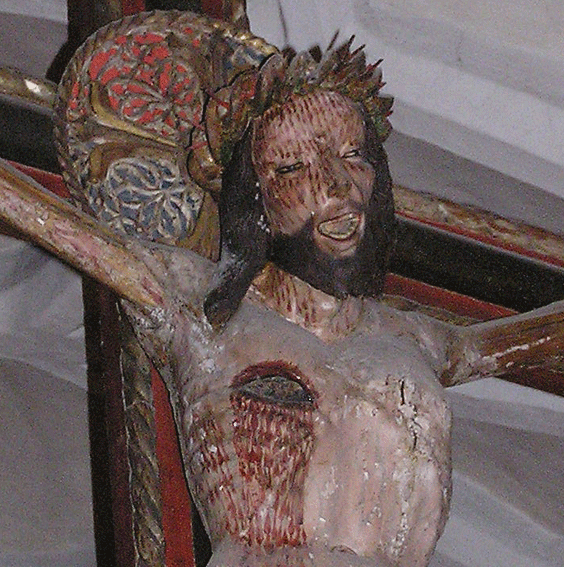
Crucified Jesus at the Ytterselö church, Sweden, c. 1500

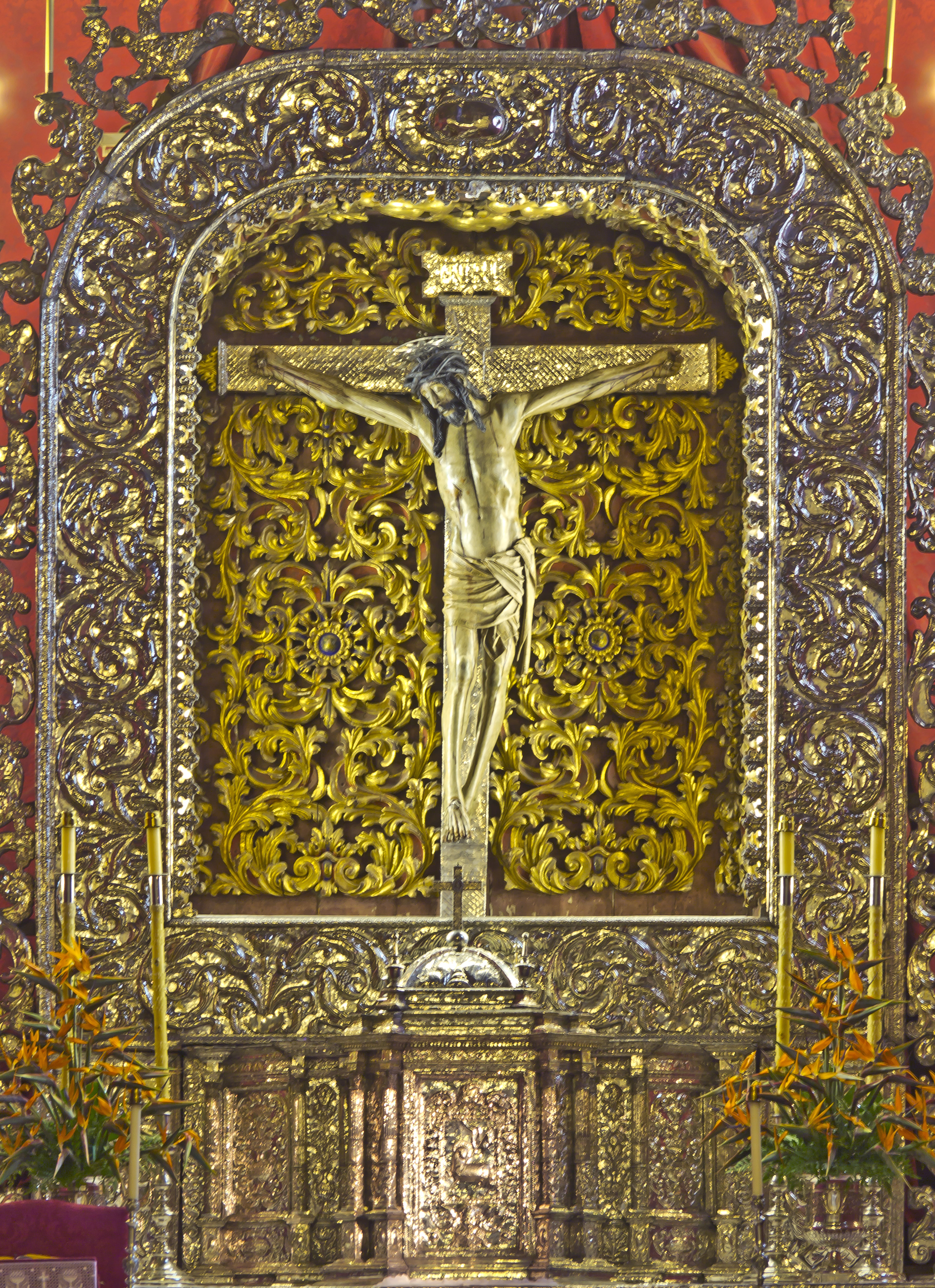
Cristo de La Laguna, Flemish-Brabanzon origin, 1510–14. San Cristóbal de La Laguna, Spain

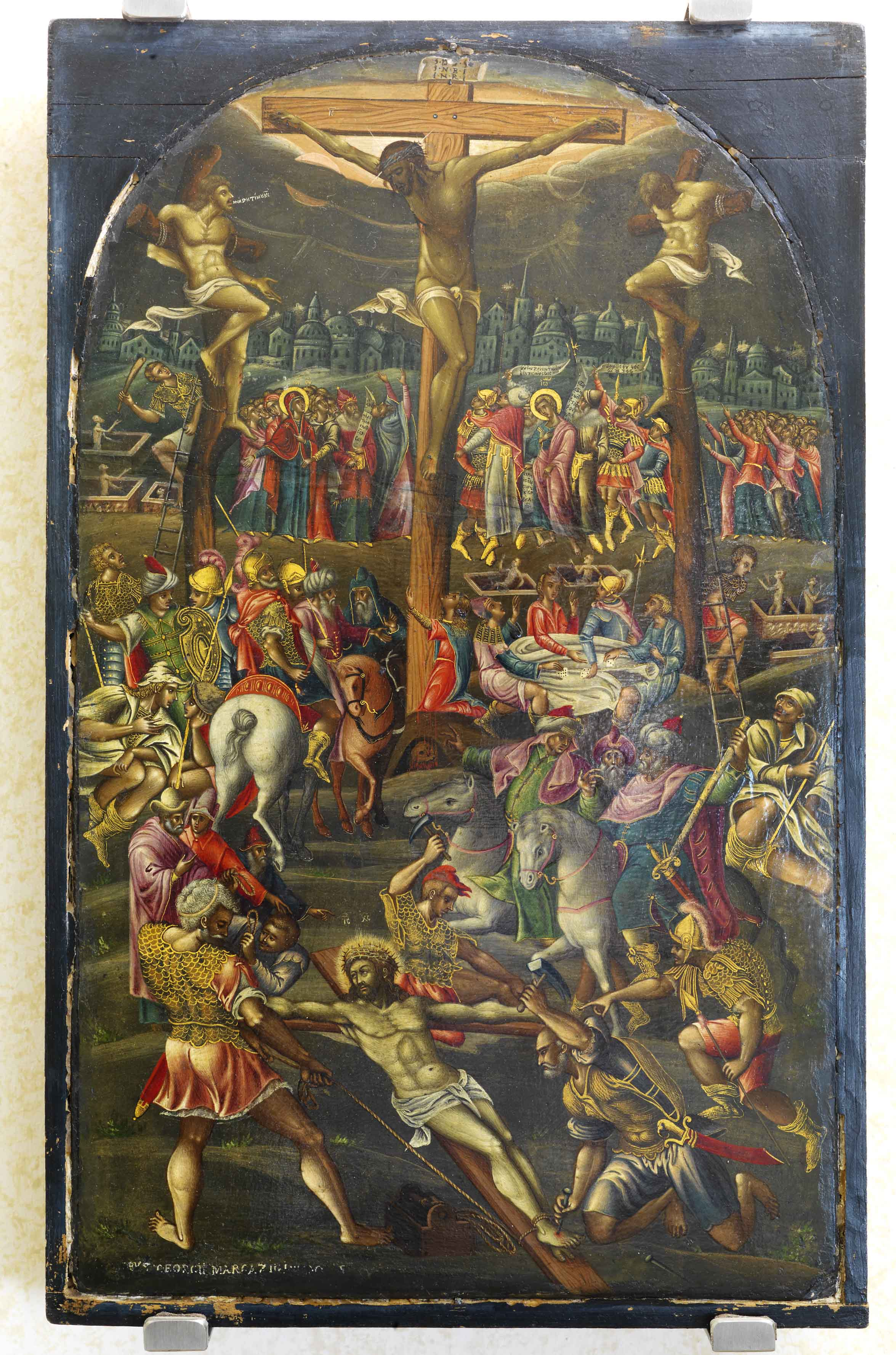
Crucifixion, Markazini, 1647

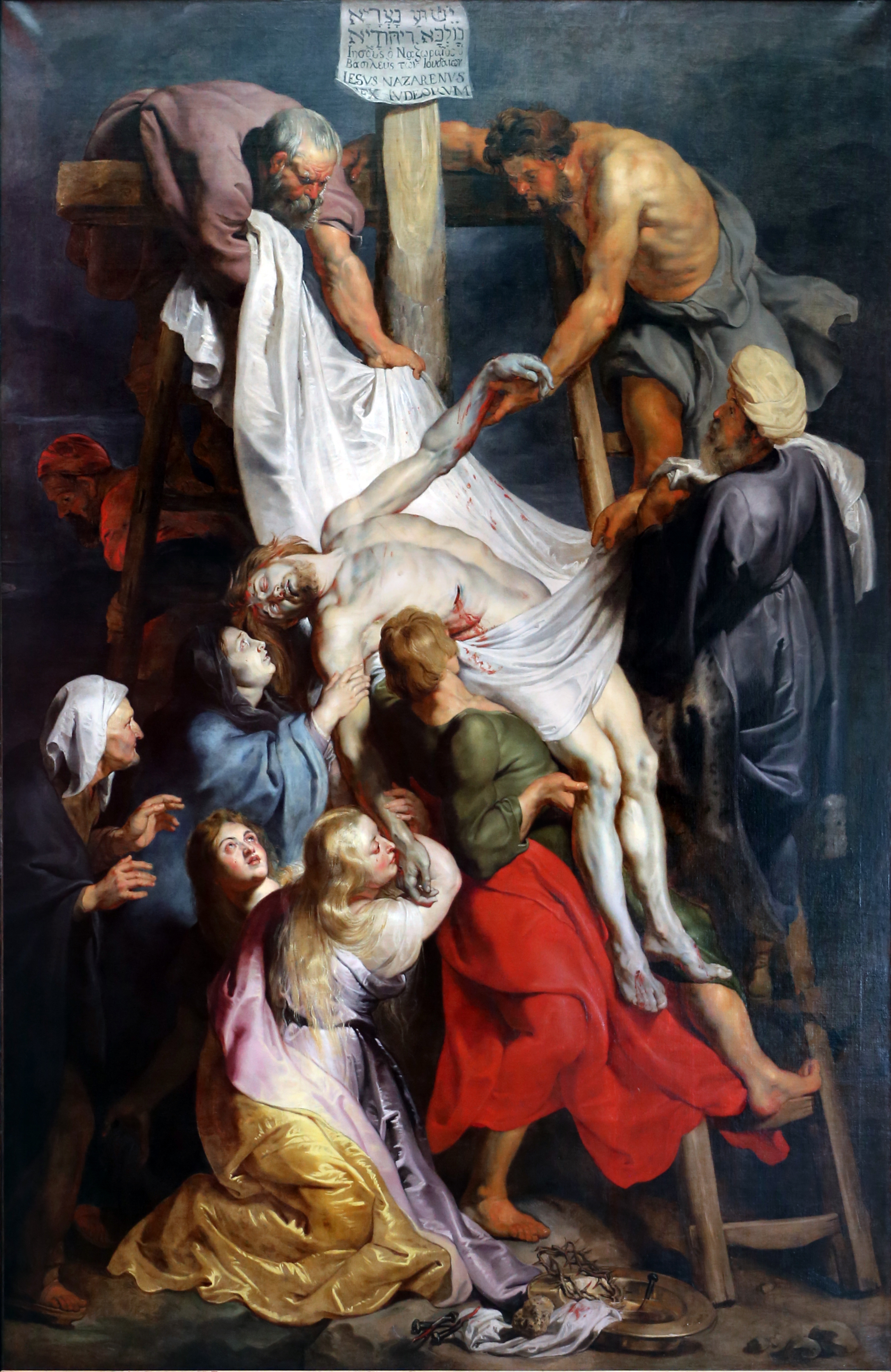
Descent from the Cross, Rubens, 1616–17

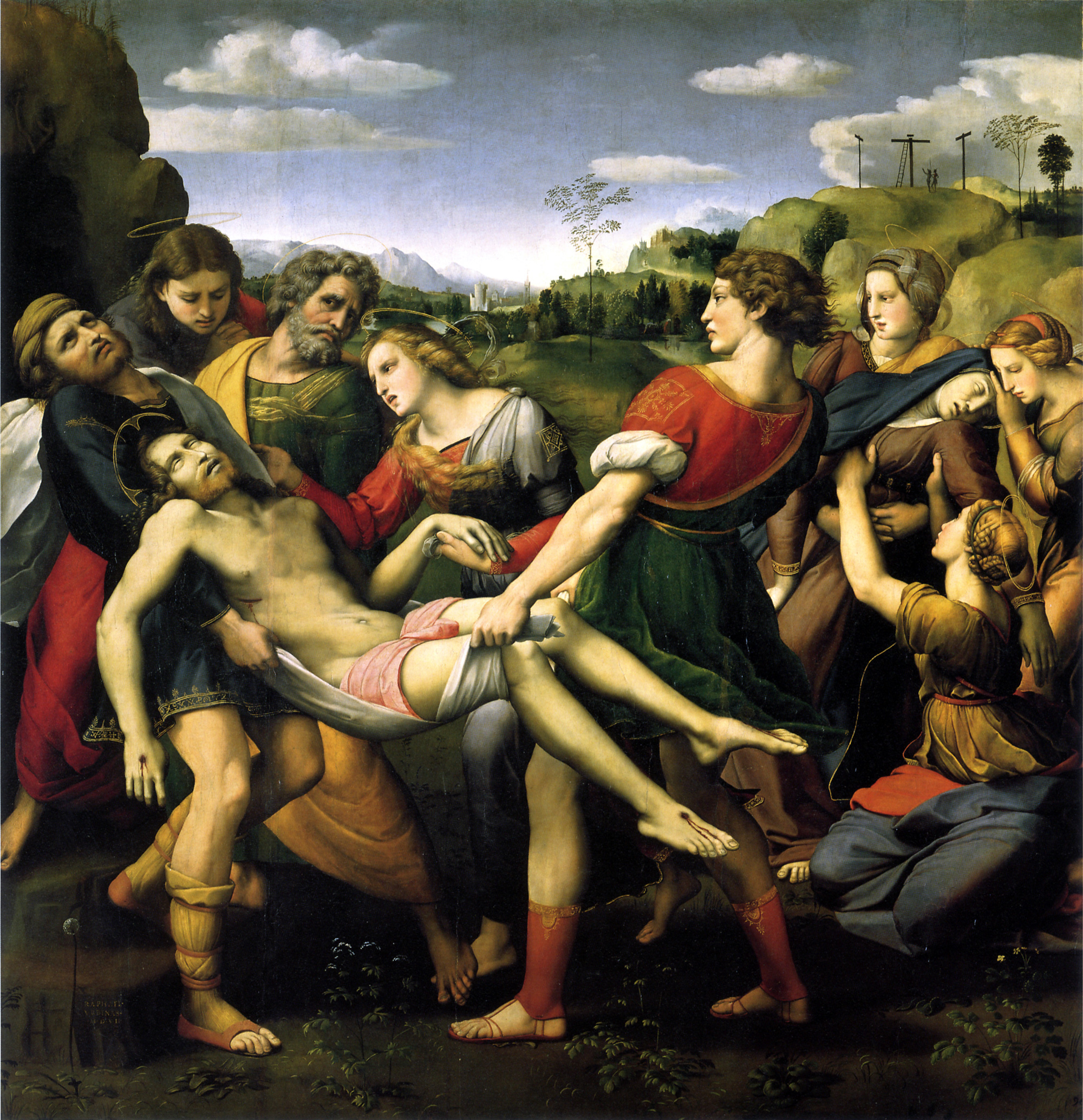
Descent from the Cross, Raphael, 1507

== See also ==
- The penitent thief and impenitent thief, crucified alongside Jesus
- Descriptions in antiquity of the execution cross
- True Cross
- Shroud of Turin
- Sudarium of Oviedo
- Feast of the Cross
- Life of Jesus in the New Testament
- Seven Sorrows of Mary
- Swoon hypothesis
- Depictions of Jesus
- Calvary (monument)
- Stations of the Cross

== Sources ==
- Blomberg, Craig L. (2009). Jesus and the Gospels: An Introduction and Survey. B&H Publishing. ISBN 978-0-8054-4482-7.
- Brox, Norbert (1984). "'Doketismus' – eine Problemanzeige". Zeitschrift für Kirchengeschichte. 95. Kohlhammer Verlag: 301–314. ISSN 0044-2925.
- Crossan, John Dominic (1995). Jesus: A Revolutionary Biography. HarperOne. ISBN 0-06-061662-8.
- Dunn, James D. G. (2003). Jesus Remembered. Wm. B. Eerdmans. ISBN 0-8028-3931-2.
- Eddy, Paul; Boyd, Gregory (2007). The Jesus Legend: A Case for the Historical Reliability of the Synoptic Jesus Tradition. Baker Academic. ISBN 978-0-8010-3114-4.
- Ehrman, Bart D. (2008). A Brief Introduction to the New Testament. Oxford University Press. ISBN 978-0-19-536934-2.
- Henige, David P. (2005). Historical Evidence and Argument. Wisconsin: University of Wisconsin Press. ISBN 978-0-299-21410-4.
- Lüdemann, Gerd (1997). The Unholy in Holy Scripture: The Dark Side of the Bible. Westminster John Knox Press. ISBN 0-664-25739-9.
- Meier, John P. (2006). "How do we decide what comes from Jesus". In Dunn, James D. G.; McKnight, Scot (eds.). The Historical Jesus in Recent Research. Eisenbrauns. ISBN 1-57506-100-7.
- Tuckett, Christopher M. (2001). Bockmuehl, Markus N. A. (ed.). The Cambridge Companion to Jesus. Cambridge University Press. ISBN 0-521-79678-4.
- Verhoeven, Paul (2010). Jesus of Nazareth. Seven Stories Press. ISBN 978-1-58322-905-7.
