= What Our Lord Saw from the Cross =

Painting by James Tissot

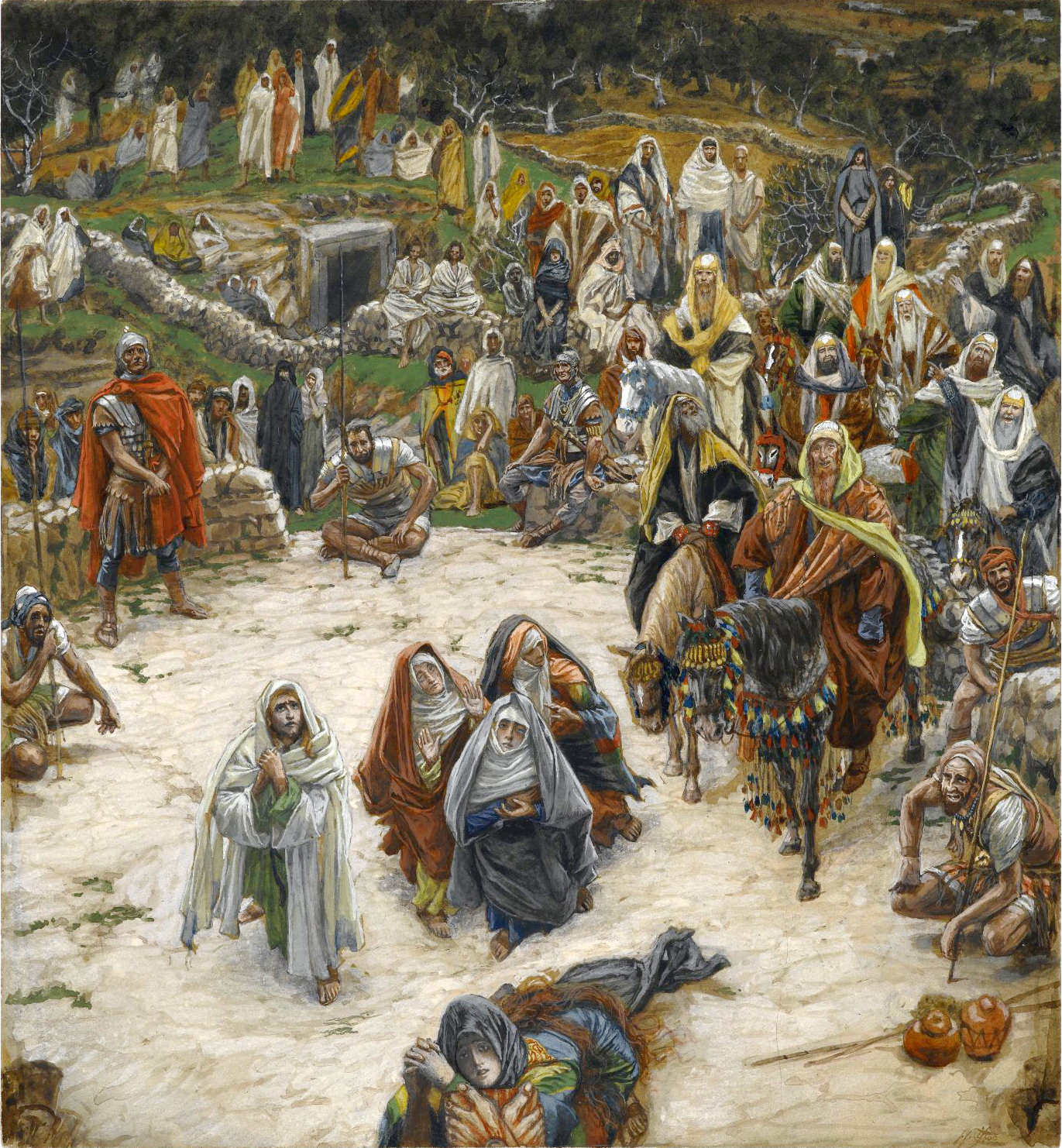
- Artist: James Tissot
- Year: c. 1890
- Type: Watercolor: gouache over graphite on gray-green wove paper
- Dimensions: 23 cm × 24.8 cm (9.1 in × 9.8 in)
- Location: Brooklyn Museum, New York

What Our Lord Saw from the Cross (Ce que voyait Notre-Seigneur sur la Croix) is an watercolor painting by the French painter James Tissot, from c. 1890. It is held at the Brooklyn Museum, in New York

== Background ==
In 1886, James Tissot, a successful late-19th-century painter, began to illustrate the New Testament after experiencing a religious revival in Church of St. Sulpice. Tissot then travelled to the Middle East in order to study contemporary life to make his paintings (what he believed to be) historically accurate over mere religious emotion. However, Tissot may have neglected the inconstancy of Middle Eastern culture over time; his works depicting the artisanal items (such as the patterns of rugs and costumes) and the time's customs may reflect Jerusalem in the 19th-century much more than in biblical times.

== History and description ==
The work is unusual for its portrayal of the Crucifixion of Jesus, seen from the perspective of Jesus on the cross, rather than featuring Christ at the center of the work. The scene shows witnesses, including Jesus' followers (the women and the disciple whom Jesus loved), participants, and bystanders; of Jesus' own body only the feet can be seen, at the bottom of the picture, above the distraught Mary Magdalene. Some Jews can be seen on horseback, most likely the Sanhedrin members who decreed his death. Several Roman legionaries guard the scene. In the distance is the entrance to the tomb.

The painting is part of the series The Life of Jesus Christ, a collection of 350 gouache watercolors of events from the Gospels completed by Tissot. Prints were also published of the compositions. The whole watercolor series was completed between 1886 and 1894; in that year, he presented his work in Paris, met with great enthusiasm, the works then travelling to Manhattan, Brooklyn, Boston, Philadelphia, and Chicago. The Life of Jesus Christ series was acquired in 1900 by the Brooklyn Museum in New York and went on display the following year, though it has seldom been displayed, largely due to preservation concerns.
