= Unknown years of Jesus =

Period in the life of Jesus

The unknown years of Jesus (also called his silent years, lost years, or missing years) generally refers to the period of Jesus's life between the accounts of his childhood and his baptism, for which the canonical gospels provide no detailed narrative.

The Gospel of Luke relates an episode involving Jesus at the age of twelve and later states that he was “about thirty years old” when he began his ministry. The gospels provide no continuous account of the intervening period. Mark 6:3 describes Jesus as ho tektōn, while Matthew 13:55 refers to him as “the carpenter's son”. The Greek term tektōn had a broader semantic range than the modern English word “carpenter” and could denote a woodworker, artisan or builder. Scholars have therefore often inferred that Jesus practised a manual trade in Galilee before his public ministry, but the sources do not establish the precise materials he worked with, where he worked, or that he worked alongside Joseph throughout this period.

From the late nineteenth century onward, various writers proposed that Jesus had travelled to India or Tibet, or had received religious instruction outside Galilee, during the period not narrated in the gospels. Modern historical-Jesus scholarship does not regard these travel narratives as historically supported, since their purported sources are late and no ancient evidence places Jesus in these regions.

== The 18 unknown years ==
=== New Testament gap ===
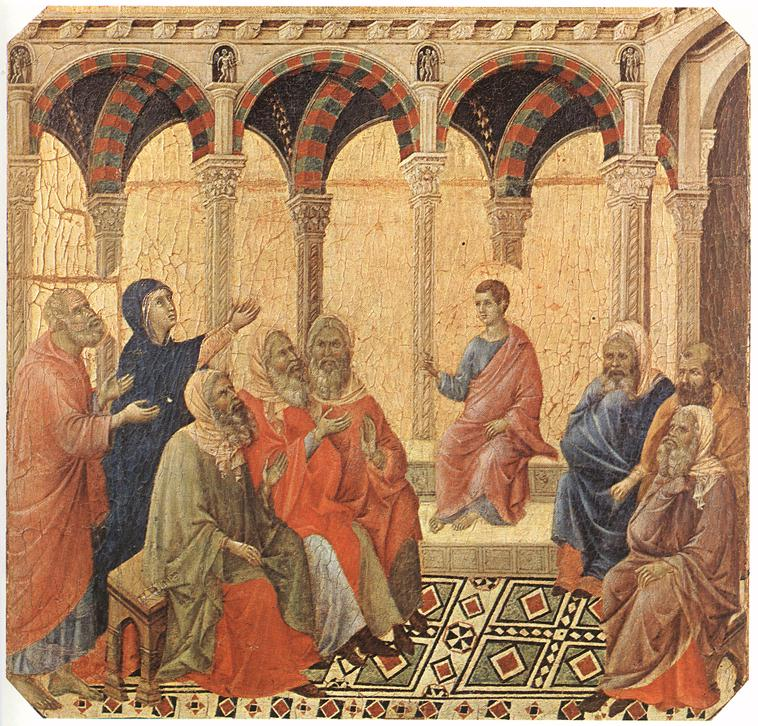
12 year old Jesus talking with the learned sages of the Temple. Duccio, early 14th century.

Following the accounts of Jesus' young life, there is a gap of about 18 years in his story in the New Testament.

The Finding in the Temple is described in chapter 2 of the Gospel of Luke. It is the only event of the later childhood of Jesus mentioned in a canonical gospel. This describes Jesus, at the age of 12, slipping away from his parents while on a family pilgrimage to Jerusalem. They found him discoursing with the teachers at the Temple in Jerusalem, who were all amazed at the depth of his understanding of religious and philosophical matters. Luke says that after that Jesus returned with his parents to Nazareth and "advanced in wisdom and stature, and in favor with God and men", but other than that nothing is written in the gospels of Jesus' next 18 years.

Christian tradition suggests that Jesus simply lived in Galilee during that period. Modern scholarship holds that there is little historical information to determine what happened during those years.

The ages of 12 and 29, the approximate ages at either end of the unknown years, have some significance in Judaism of the Second Temple period: 13 is the age of the bar mitzvah, the age of secular maturity, and 30 the age of readiness for the priesthood, although Jesus was not of the tribe of Levi.

Christians have generally taken the statement in Mark 6:3 referring to Jesus as "Is not this the carpenter...?" (Greek: οὐχ οὗτός ἐστιν ὁ τέκτων, romanized: ouch outos estin ho tektōn) as an indication that before the age of 30 Jesus had been working as a carpenter. The tone of the passage leading to the question "Is not this the carpenter?" suggests familiarity with Jesus in the area, reinforcing that he had been generally seen as a carpenter in the gospel account before the start of his ministry. Matthew 13:55 poses the question as "Is not this the carpenter's son?" suggesting that the profession tektōn had been a family business and Jesus was engaged in it before starting his preaching and ministry in the gospel accounts.

=== Background of Galilee and Judea ===
The historical record of the large number of workmen employed in the rebuilding of Sepphoris has led Batey (1984) and others to suggest that when Jesus was in his teens and twenties carpenters would have found more employment at Sepphoris rather than at the small town of Nazareth.

Aside from secular employment, some attempts have been made to reconstruct the theological and rabbinical circumstances of the "unknown years". For example, soon after the discovery of the Dead Sea Scrolls novelist Edmund Wilson (1955) suggested that Jesus may have studied with the Essenes, followed by the Unitarian Charles F. Potter (1958) and others. Other writers have taken the view that the predominance of Pharisees in Judea during that period, and Jesus' own later recorded interaction with the Pharisees, makes a Pharisee background more likely, as in the recorded case of another Galilean, Josephus, who studied with all three groups: Pharisees, Sadducees and Essenes.

=== Other sources ===
The New Testament apocrypha and early Christian pseudepigrapha preserve various pious legends filling the "gaps" in Christ's youth. Charlesworth (2008) explains this as due to the canonical Gospels having left "a narrative vacuum" that many have attempted to fill.

Jesus' childhood is described in the Infancy Gospel of Thomas, the Gospel of Pseudo-Matthew, and the Syriac Infancy Gospel, among other sources.

== Claims of young Jesus in Britain ==
During the late 12th century, Joseph of Arimathea became connected with Arthurian legend, appearing in them as the first keeper of the Holy Grail. This idea first appears in Robert de Boron's Joseph d'Arimathie, in which Joseph receives the Grail from an apparition of Jesus and sends it with his followers to Britain. This theme is elaborated upon in Boron's sequels and in subsequent Arthurian works penned by others.

Some Arthurian legends hold that Jesus travelled to Britain as a boy, lived at Priddy in the Mendips, and built the first wattle cabin at Glastonbury. William Blake's early 19th-century poem "And did those feet in ancient time" is assumed to be inspired by the story of Jesus travelling to Britain. However, according to British folklore scholar A. W. Smith, "there was little reason to believe that an oral tradition concerning a visit made by Jesus to Britain existed before the early part of the twentieth century". In some versions, Joseph was supposedly a tin merchant and took Jesus under his care when his mother Mary was widowed. Gordon Strachan wrote Jesus the Master Builder: Druid Mysteries and the Dawn of Christianity (1998), which was the basis of the documentary titled And Did Those Feet (2009). Strachan believed Jesus may have travelled to Britain to study with the Druids.

== Claims of young Jesus in India and/or Tibet ==
=== Nicolas Notovich, 1887 ===
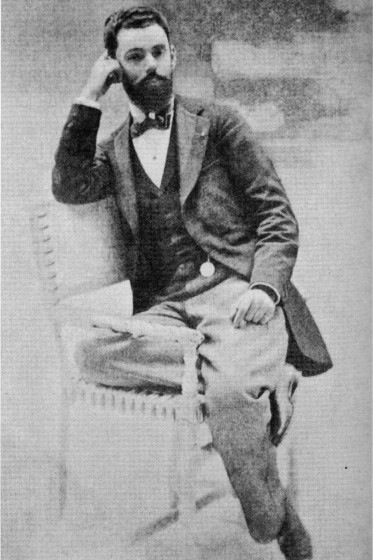
Nicolas Notovitch

In 1887, Russian war correspondent Nicolas Notovitch claimed that while at the Hemis Monastery in Ladakh, he had learned of a document called the "Life of Saint Issa, Best of the Sons of Men" – Isa being the Arabic name of Jesus in Islam. Notovitch's story, with a translated text of the "Life of Saint Issa", was published in French in 1894 as La vie inconnue de Jesus Christ (Unknown Life of Jesus Christ).

According to the scrolls, Jesus abandoned Jerusalem at the age of 13 and set out towards India, "intending to improve and perfect himself in the divine understanding and to studying the laws of the great Buddha". He crossed Punjab and reached Puri Jagannath where he studied the Vedas under Brahmin priests. He spent six years in Puri and Rajgir, near Nalanda, the ancient seat of Buddhist learning. Then he went to the Himalayas, and spent time in Tibetan monasteries, studying Buddhism, and through Persia, returned to Jerusalem at the age of 29.

Notovitch's writings were immediately controversial and Max Müller stated that either the monks at the monastery had deceived Notovitch (or played a joke on him), or he had fabricated the evidence. Müller then wrote to the monastery at Hemis and the head lama replied that there had been no Western visitor at the monastery in the past fifteen years and there were no documents related to Notovitch's story. J. Archibald Douglas then visited Hemis monastery and interviewed the head lama who stated that Notovitch had never been there. Indologist Leopold von Schroeder called Notovitch's story a "big fat lie". Wilhelm Schneemelcher states that Notovich's accounts were soon exposed as fabrications, and that to date no one has even had a glimpse at the manuscripts Notovitch claims to have had.

Notovich responded to claims to defend himself. However, once his story had been re-examined by historians – some even questioning his existence – it is claimed that Notovitch confessed to having fabricated the evidence. Bart D. Ehrman states that "Today there is not a single recognized scholar on the planet who has any doubts about the matter. The entire story was invented by Notovitch, who earned a good deal of money and a substantial amount of notoriety for his hoax". However, others deny that Notovich ever accepted the accusations against him – that his account was a forgery, etc. Although he was not impressed with his story, Sir Francis Younghusband recalls meeting Nicolas Notovitch near Skardu, not long before Notovitch had visited Hemis monastery.

In 1922, Swami Abhedananda, the president of the Vedanta Society of New York between 1897 and 1921 and the author of several books, went to the Himalayas on foot and reached Tibet, where he studied Buddhist philosophy and Tibetan Buddhism. He went to the Hemis Monastery, and allegedly found the manuscript translated by Notovitch, which was a Tibetan translation of the original scrolls written in Pali. The lama said that it was a copy and that the original was in a monastery at Marbour near Lhasa. After Abhedananda's death in 1939, one of his disciples inquired about the documents at the Hemis monastery, but was told that they had disappeared.

=== Levi H. Dowling, 1908 ===
In 1908, Levi H. Dowling published the Aquarian Gospel of Jesus the Christ which he claimed was channeled to him from the "Akashic records" as the true story of the life of Jesus, including "the 'lost' eighteen years silent in the New Testament." The narrative follows the young Jesus across India, Tibet, Persia, Assyria, Greece and Egypt. Dowling's work was later used by Holger Kersten who combined it with elements derived from other sources such as the Ahmadiyya beliefs.

=== Nicholas Roerich, 1925 ===
In 1925, Nicholas Roerich recorded his travels through Ladakh in India. This portion of his journal was published in 1933 as part of Altai Himalaya. He recounts legends of Issa shared with him by the Ladakhi people and lamas, including that Issa (Jesus) traveled from Judea to India with merchants and taught the people. An extended section of this text parallels sections of Notovitch's book, and Roerich comments on the remarkable similarity of the accounts of the Ladakhis to these passages, despite the Ladakhis having no knowledge of Notovitch's book. He also recounts that the stories of others on his travel refer to various manuscripts and legends regarding Jesus (Issa) and that he personally visited the "abbot" of Hemis.

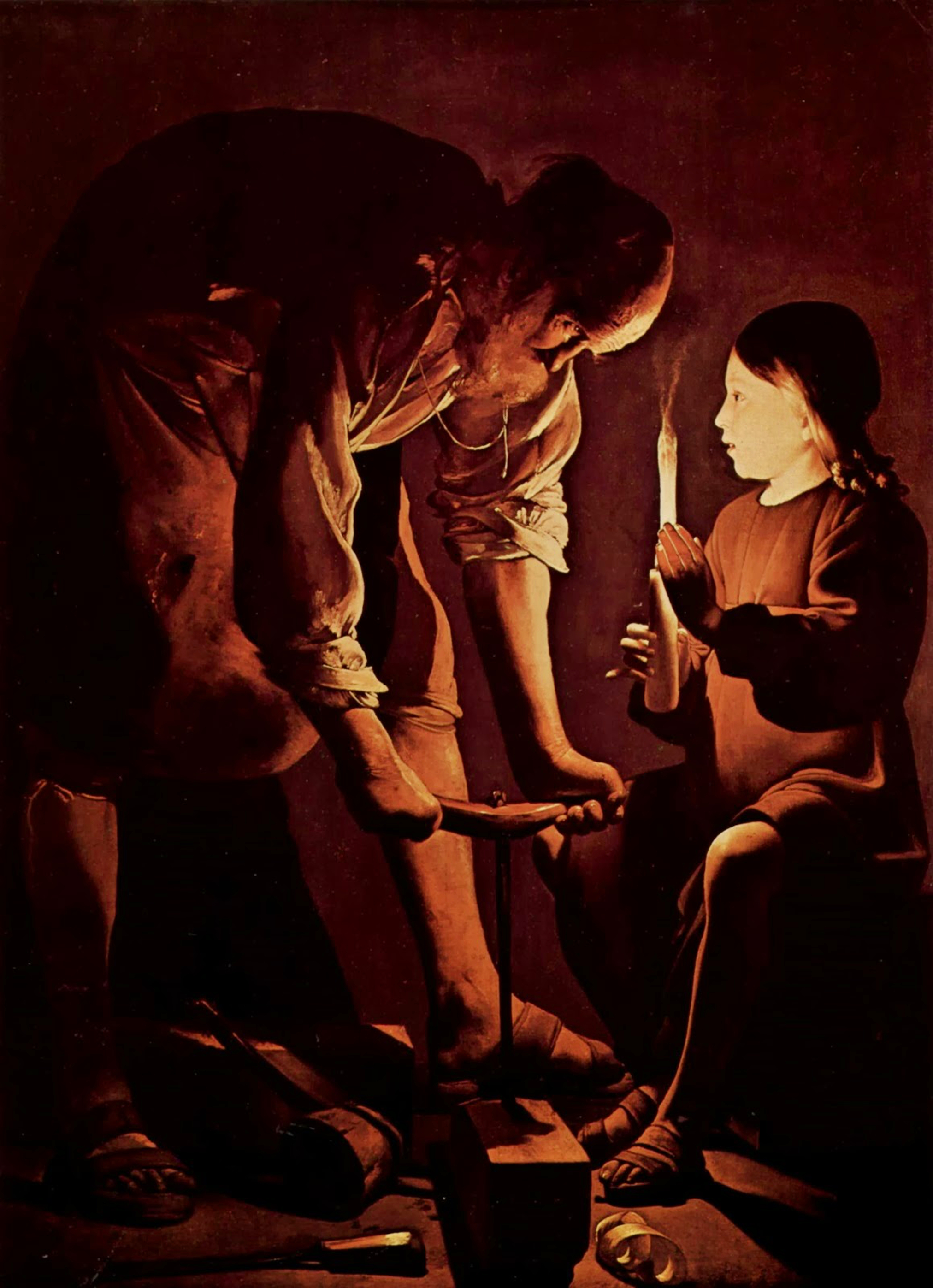
Jesus in the workshop of Joseph the Carpenter, by Georges de La Tour, 1640s

=== Rejection by modern mainstream New Testament scholarship ===
Modern mainstream Christian scholarship has generally rejected any travels by Jesus to India, Tibet or surrounding areas as without historical basis:

- Robert Van Voorst states that modern scholarship has "almost unanimously agreed" that claims of the travels of Jesus to Tibet, Kashmir or rest of India contain "nothing of value".
- Marcus Borg states that the suggestions that an adult Jesus traveled to Egypt or India and came into contact with Buddhism are "without historical foundation".
- John Dominic Crossan states that none of the theories presented about the travels of Jesus to fill the gap between his early life and the start of his ministry have been supported by modern scholarship.
- Leslie Houlden states that although modern parallels between the teachings of Jesus and Buddha have been drawn, these comparisons emerged after missionary contacts in the 19th century and there is no historically reliable evidence of contacts between Buddhism and Jesus.
- Paula Fredriksen states that no serious scholarly work places Jesus outside the backdrop of 1st century Judaism.

== Other claims ==
=== Japan ===
Some people in Japan have believed that Jesus visited them during the lost years and possibly survived the crucifixion to remain in Japan for the rest of his life. The legend exists in a village named Shingō, Aomori, and the supposed tomb Kirisuto no Haka.

=== The Urantia Book ===
In The Urantia Book – a spiritual, philosophical, and religious book that originated in the United States in the early/mid 20th century – purports, amongst other things, to recount revelations from a divine source about the life of Jesus. It claims that, in the period when he was 13–30 years old, Jesus took trips to Rome and Urmia. Paper 127 of The Urantia Book covers "The Adolescent Years"; subsequent papers cover the trip to Rome, and Paper 134 concerns a period shortly before Jesus' baptism by John.

== Artistic and literary renditions ==
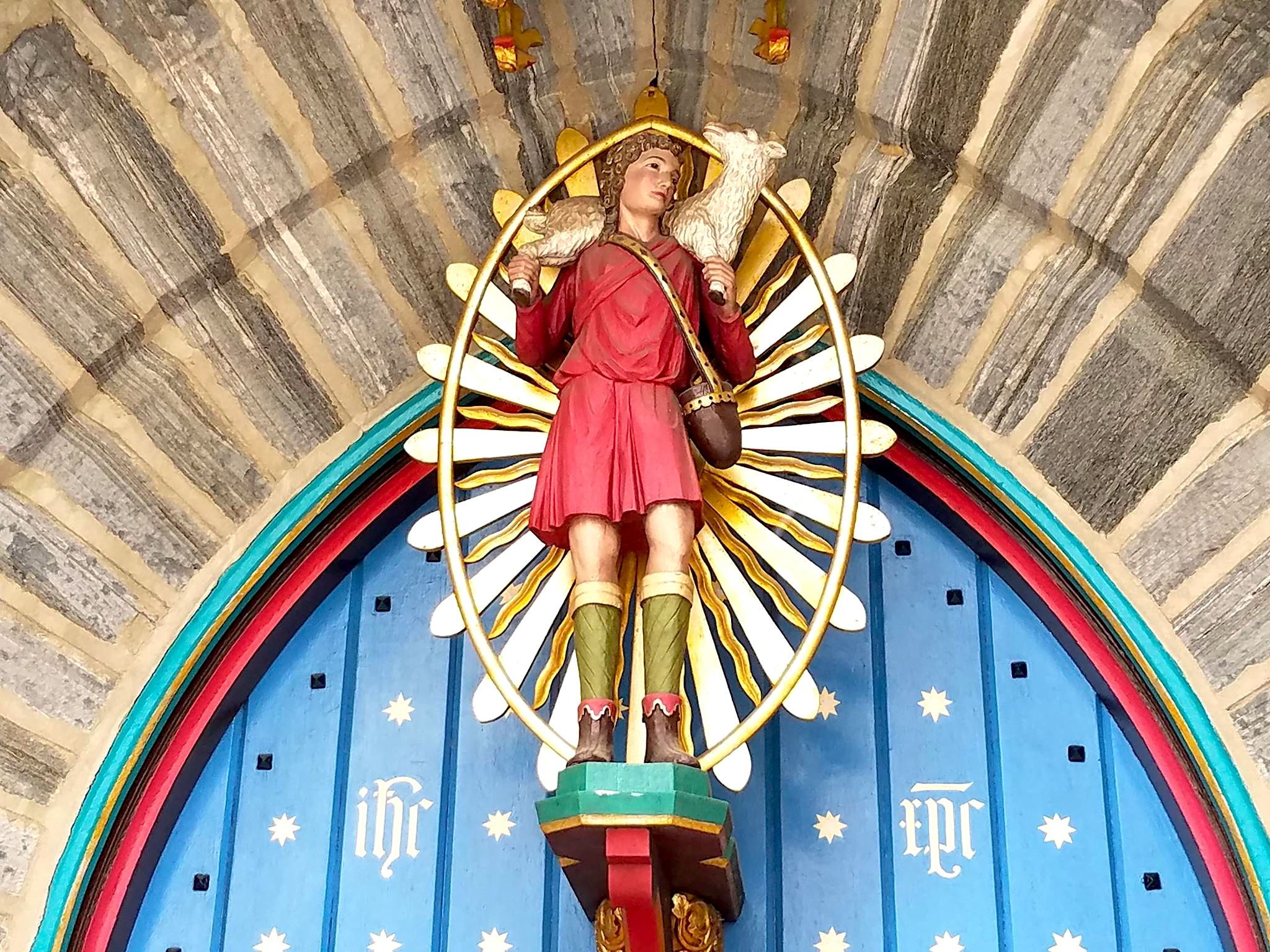
The boy Jesus represented as the Good Shepherd; image above the North door of the Church of the Good Shepherd (Rosemont, Pennsylvania)

In 1996, the documentary Mysteries of the Bible presented an overview of the theories related to the travels of Jesus to India and interviewed a number of scholars on the subject.

Also in 1996, John Farman published Jesus - The Teenage Years, a comic novel for children.

Edward T. Martin's book King of Travelers: Jesus' Lost Years in India (2008) was used as the basis for Paul Davids' film Jesus in India (2008) shown on the Sundance Channel. The book and film cover Martin's search for Notovitch's claimed "Life of Issa."

The book Lamb: The Gospel According to Biff, Christ's Childhood Pal, by Christopher Moore, is a fictional comedy which tells the story of Jesus's adolescence and his travels to India and China from the point of view of Jesus's best friend Biff.

== See also ==
- Basilidians
- Gospel of Barnabas
- Gospel of Basilides
- Gospel of James
- Life of Jesus in the New Testament
- The Life and Teachings of Jesus in The Urantia Book
