= Gordon Strachan (disambiguation) =

Gordon Strachan (born 1957) is a Scottish football manager and former player.

Gordon Strachan may also refer to:

- Gordon Strachan (minister) (1934–2010), Church of Scotland minister, theologian, university lecturer and author
- Gordon Strachan (rugby union) (born 1947), Scottish rugby union player
- Gordon C. Strachan (born 1943), political aide
