= Prophecy of Melkin =

The Prophecy of Melkin is a medieval text about an alleged hidden grave of Joseph of Arimathea at Glastonbury in England, containing the Holy Grail. It is contained in a local chronicle (Cronica sive antiquitates Glastoniensis ecclesiae) written by John of Glastonbury in the mid-14th century, who attributes it to an alleged Celtic bard named Melkin, said to have lived "before Merlin". It is thought to have been created in the context of legends that linked Joseph of Arimathea with the mythical Avalon, Glastonbury and the court of King Arthur, which had arisen in England in the mid-13th century.

== Extant sources ==
The legend may have been partly based on an older narrative of how the discovery of the alleged grave of King Arthur at Glastonbury, in c. 1191, had been foretold by an ancient Welsh bard, mentioned by Gerald of Wales around 1193.

Later references to Melkin are found in a chronicle of John Hardyng in the mid-15th century, and in writings of John Leland in the 16th century. Leland claimed that Melkin was a famous and erudite ancient British writer and a bard, of Welsh origin, and that he was the author of a "History of Britain" (Historiola de Rebus Britannicis), of which Leland had seen ancient fragments in Glastonbury. Other 16th- und 17th-century writers such as John Bale and John Pitts placed Melkin in the mid-6th century, the time associated with King Arthur.

It has been conjectured that the name of Melkin may have been based on that of the 6th-century Welsh king Maelgwn of Gwynedd, who also had a reputation as a bard and prophet.

== Text ==
A modern English translation of the Latin text of the prophecy, by J. A. Robinson, runs as follows:

Amid these Joseph in marble
Of Arimathea by name
Hath found perpetual sleep
And he lies on a two-forked line
Next the south corner of an oratory
Fashioned of wattles
For the adoring of a mighty Virgin

In his sarcophagus
Two cruets, white and silver
Filled with blood and sweat
Of the Prophet Jesus
When his sarcophagus
Shall be found entire, intact
In time to come, it shall be seen

And shall be open unto all the world
Thenceforth nor water nor the dew of heaven
Shall fail the dwellers in that ancient isle
For a long while before
The day of judgment in Josaphat
Open shall these things be
And declared to living men.

== Bibliography ==
- Carley, James P. (1985). The Chronicle of Glastonbury Abbey: An Edition, Translation and Study of John of Glastonbury's "Cronica sive Antiquitates Glastoniensis Ecclesiae". Translated by David Townsend. Boydell Press.
- Carley, James P. (1994). "A Grave Event: Henry V, Glastonbury Abbey, and Joseph of Arimathea's Bones". In Shichtman, Martin B.; Carley, James P. (eds.). Culture and the King: The Social Implications of the Arthurian Legend. State University of New York Press. pp. 129–148. ISBN 978-0791418635.
- Carley, James P. (2004). "John of Glastonbury and Borrowings from the Vernacular". In Firth Green, Richard; Mooney, Linne R. (eds.). Interstices: Studies in Middle English and Anglo-Latin Texts in Honour of A.G. Rigg. University of Toronto Press. pp. 44–73. ISBN 978-0802087430.
- Lyons, William John (2014). Joseph of Arimathea: A study in reception history. Oxford: Oxford University Press.
- Robinson, J. A. (1926). Two Glastonbury Legends: King Arthur and St. Joseph of Arimathea. Cambridge: Cambridge University Press.
