= Son of God (Christianity) =

Jesus as the son of God the Father

In Christianity, the title Son of God refers to the status of Jesus as the divine son of God the Father.

It derives from several uses in the New Testament and early Christian theology. The terms "son of God" and "son of the LORD" are found in several passages of the Old Testament.

== Old Testament usage ==
=== Genesis ===
In the introduction to the Genesis flood narrative, Genesis 6:2 refers to "sons of God" who married the daughters of men and is used to refer to angels.

=== Exodus ===
In Exodus 4:22, the Israelites as a people are called "my firstborn son" by God, using the singular form.

=== Deuteronomy ===
In some versions of Deuteronomy, the Dead Sea Scrolls refer to the sons of God rather than the sons of Israel, probably in reference to angels. The Septuagint reads similarly.

=== Psalms ===
In Psalm 89:26–28, David calls God his father. God in turn tells David that he will make David his first-born and highest king of the earth.

In Psalm 82:1–8, the Biblical judges are called gods and the sons of God.

==== Royal psalms ====
Psalm 2 is thought to be an enthronement text. The rebel nations and the uses of an iron rod are Assyrian motifs. The begetting of the king is an Egyptian one. Israel's kings are referred to as the son of the LORD. They are reborn or adopted on the day of their enthroning as the "son of the LORD".

Some scholars think that Psalm 110 is an alternative enthronement text. Psalm 110:1 distinguishes the king from the LORD. The LORD asks the king to sit at his right hand. Psalm 110:3 may or may not have a reference to the begetting of kings. The exact translation of 110:3 is uncertain. In the traditional Hebrew translations his youth is renewed like the morning dew. In some alternative translations the king is begotten by God like the morning dew or by the morning dew. One possible translation of 110:4 is that the king is told that he is a priest like Melchizedek. Another possibility is to translate Melchizedek not as a name but rather as a title "Righteous King". If a reference is made to Melchizedek this could be linked to pre-Israelite Canaanite belief. The invitation to sit at the right hand of the deity and the king's enemy's being used as footstools are both classic Egyptian motifs, as is the association of the king with the rising sun. Many scholars now think that Israelite beliefs evolved from Canaanite beliefs. Jews have traditionally believed that Psalm 110 applied only to King David. Being the first Davidic king, he had certain priest-like responsibilities.

Some believe that these psalms were not meant to apply to a single king, but rather were used during the enthronement ceremony. The fact that the Royal psalms were preserved suggests that the influence of Egyptian and other near eastern cultures on pre-exile religion needs to be taken seriously. Ancient Egyptians used similar language to describe pharaohs. Assyrian and Canaanite influences among others are also noted.

=== Samuel ===
In 2 Samuel 7:13–16, God promises David regarding his offspring that "I will be to him as a father and he will be to me as a son." The promise is one of eternal kingship.

=== Isaiah ===
In Isaiah 9:6, the next king is greeted, similarly to the passages in Psalms. Like Psalm 45:7–8 he is figuratively likened to the supreme king God. Isaiah could also be interpreted as the birth of a royal child, Psalm 2 nevertheless leaves the accession scenario as an attractive possibility. The king in 9:6 is thought to have been Hezekiah by Jews and various academic scholars.

=== Jeremiah ===
In Jeremiah 31:9, God refers to himself as the father of Israel and Ephraim as his first born son. Ephraim in Jeremiah refers collectively to the northern kingdom.

=== Deuterocanonicals ===
==== Wisdom ====
The Book of Wisdom refers to a righteous man as the son of God.

==== Sirach ====
In the Book of Sirach 4:10, in the Hebrew text, God calls a person who acts righteously his son. The Greek reads slightly differently; here, he will be "like a son of the Most High".

== Theological development ==
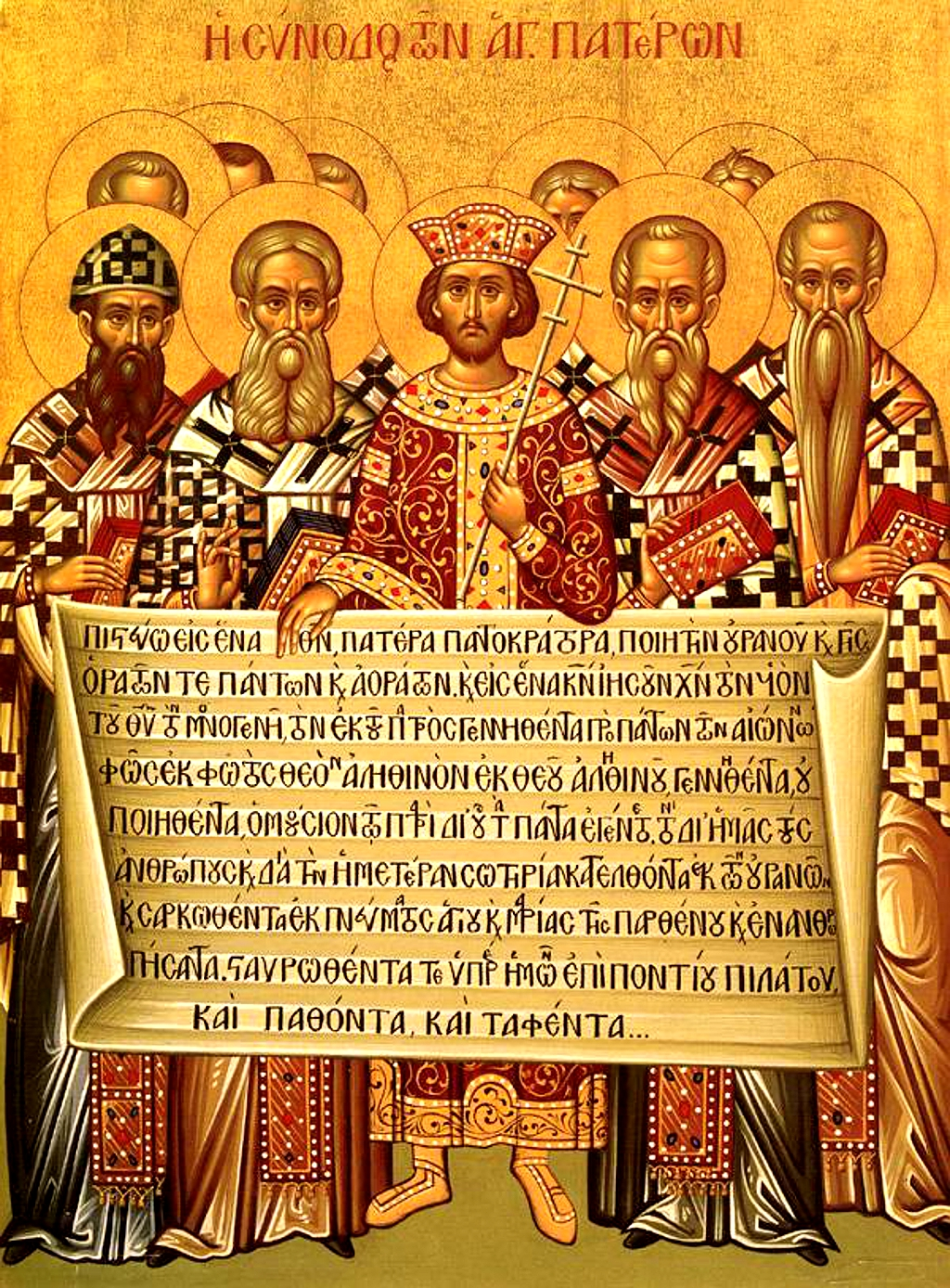
Emperor Constantine and the Fathers of the First Council of Nicaea of 325 with the Niceno–Constantinopolitan Creed of 381

Through the centuries, the theological development of the concept of the Son of God has engaged with other Christological elements, including pre-existence of Christ, son of man, the hypostatic union, and related doctrines. For instance, in Johannine "Christology from above" which begins with the pre-existence of Christ, Jesus did not become Son of God through the virgin birth, he was always the Son of God. The term Son of God is also found as a small fragment along with other Dead Sea Scrolls, numbered as 4Q246.

Early Christians developed various view of how Jesus related to God and what role he played in God's plan for salvation.

By the 2nd century, differences had developed among various Christian groups and to defend the mainstream view in the early Church, Irenaeus introduced the confession: "One Christ only, Jesus the Son of God incarnate for our salvation". By referring to incarnation, this professes Jesus as the pre-existing Logos, i.e. the Word. It also professes him as both Christ and the only-begotten Son of God.

To establish a common ground, the Nicene Creed of 325 began with the profession of the Father Almighty and then states belief:

...in one Lord Jesus Christ, the Son of God, the only-begotten of his Father, of the substance of the Father, God of God, Light of Light, very God of very God, begotten, not made, being of one substance with the Father.

Augustine of Hippo wrote at length on the title "Son of God* and its relationship with the title "Son of man", positioning the two issues in terms of the dual nature of Jesus as both divine and human in terms of the hypostatic union. He wrote:

Christ Jesus, the Son of God, is God and Man: God before all worlds, man in our world [...] But since he is the only Son of God, by nature and not by grace, he became also the Son of Man that he might be full of grace as well.

However, unlike Son of God, the proclamation of Jesus as the "son of man" has never been an article of faith in Christianity. The interpretation of the use of "the Son of man" and its relationship to Son of God has remained challenging and after 150 years of debate no consensus on the issue has emerged among scholars.

Just as in Romans 10:9–13 the Apostle Paul emphasized the salvific value of "professing by mouth" that Jesus is Lord (Kyrion Iesoun), Augustine emphasized the value of "professing that Jesus is the Son of God" as a path to salvation.

For Thomas Aquinas (who also taught the Perfection of Christ), the "'Son of God' is God as known to God". Aquinas emphasized the crucial role of the Son of God in bringing forth all of creation and taught that although humans are created in the image of God they fall short and only the Son of God is truly like God, and hence divine.

== Meaning ==
Of all the Christological titles used in the New Testament, Son of God has had one of the most lasting impacts in Christian history and has become part of the profession of faith by many Christians.

The New Testament quotes Psalm 110 extensively as applying to the Son of God. A new theological understanding of Psalm 110:1 and 110:4, distinct from that of Judaism, evolved. Jesus himself quotes Psalm 110 in Luke 20:41–44, Matthew 22:41–45, and Mark 12:35–37. The meanings and authenticity of these quotations are debated among modern scholars. Various modern critical scholars reject that David wrote this psalm. In the Masoretic Text many Psalm including this one are explicitly attributed to David. The superscription is "of David a psalm." Some have suggested that this indicates that Psalm 110 was not written by David. The superscription as it stands is ambiguous. However, Jewish tradition ascribes Psalm 110 and indeed all Psalms to king David. In Christianity, David is considered to be a prophet. The New Testament records several psalms as having been spoken through David by the Holy Spirit. Acts 2:29–30 explicitly calls David a prophet. Jesus himself affirms the authorship of this psalm by David in Mark 12:36 and Matthew 22:43. In the Christian reading, David the king is presented as having a lord other than the Lord God. The second lord is the Messiah, who is greater than David, because David calls him "my lord". In Hebrew, the first "Lord" in Psalm 110 is Yahweh (יהוה), while the second is referred to as adoni (אדני, 'my adon'), a form of address that in the Old Testament is used generally for humans but also, in Judges 6:13, for the theophanic Angel of the Lord. The Greek-speaking Jewish philosopher Philo, a contemporary of Jesus, identified the Angel of the Lord with his version of the logos distinct from the later Christian logos.

It is debated when exactly Christians came to understand Psalm 110 as introducing a distinction of persons in the Godhead and indicating that Jesus was more than a human or angelic messiah, but also a divine entity who was David's lord. Hebrews 1:13 again quotes Psalm 110 to prove that the Son is superior to angels. Psalm 110 would play a crucial role in the development of the early Christian understanding of the divinity of Jesus. The final reading of Psalm 110:1 incorporated a preexistent Son of God greater than both David and the angels. The Apostles' Creed and the Niceno-Constantinopolitan Creed would all included references to Psalm 110:1.

Psalm 2:7 reads:

I will tell of the decree of the Lord:

He said to me, "You are my son; today I have begotten you. Ask of me, and I will make the nations your heritage, and the ends of the earth your possession. You shall break them with a rod of iron, and dash them in pieces like a potter's vessel."

— Psalm 2:7

Psalm 2 can be seen as referring to a particular king of Judah, but has also been understood to reference the awaited Messiah. In the New Testament, Adam, and, most notably, Jesus Christ References to Psalm 2 in the New Testament are less common than Psalm 110. The passages in Acts, Hebrews and Romans that refer to it give the appearance of being linked with Jesus' resurrection and/or exaltation. Those in the Gospels associate it with Jesus' baptism and transfiguration. The majority of scholars believe that the earliest Christian use of this Psalm was in relation to his resurrection, suggesting that this was initially thought of as the moment when he became Son, a status that the early Christians later extended back to his earthly life, to the beginning of that earthly life and, later still, to his pre-existence, a view that Aquila Hyung Il Lee questions.

The terms sons of God and son of God appear frequently in Jewish literature, and leaders of the people, kings and princes were called "sons of God". What Jesus did with the language of divine sonship was first of all to apply it individually (to himself) and to fill it with a meaning that lifted "Son of God" beyond the level of his being merely a human being made like Adam in the image of God, his being perfectly sensitive to the Holy Spirit (Luke 4:1, 14, 18), his bringing God's peace (Luke 2:14; Luke 10:5–6) albeit in his own way (Matthew 10:34, Luke 12:51), or even his being God's designated Messiah.

In the New Testament, the title "Son of God" is applied to Jesus on many occasions. It is often used to refer to his divinity, from the beginning of the New Testament narrative when in Luke 1:32–35 the angel Gabriel announces: "the power of the Most High shall overshadow thee: wherefore also the holy thing which is begotten shall be called the Son of God."

The declaration that Jesus is the Son of God is echoed by many sources in the New Testament. On two separate occasions the declarations are by God the Father, when during the Baptism of Jesus and then during the Transfiguration as a voice from Heaven. On several occasions the disciples call Jesus the Son of God and even the Jews scornfully remind Jesus during his crucifixion of his claim to be the "Son of God."

However, the concept of God as the father of Jesus, and Jesus as the exclusive divine Son of God is distinct from the concept of God as the Creator and father of all people, as indicated in the Apostles' Creed. The profession begins with expressing belief in the "Father almighty, creator of heaven and earth" and then immediately, but separately, in "Jesus Christ, his only Son, our Lord", thus expressing both senses of fatherhood within the Creed.

== New Testament usage ==
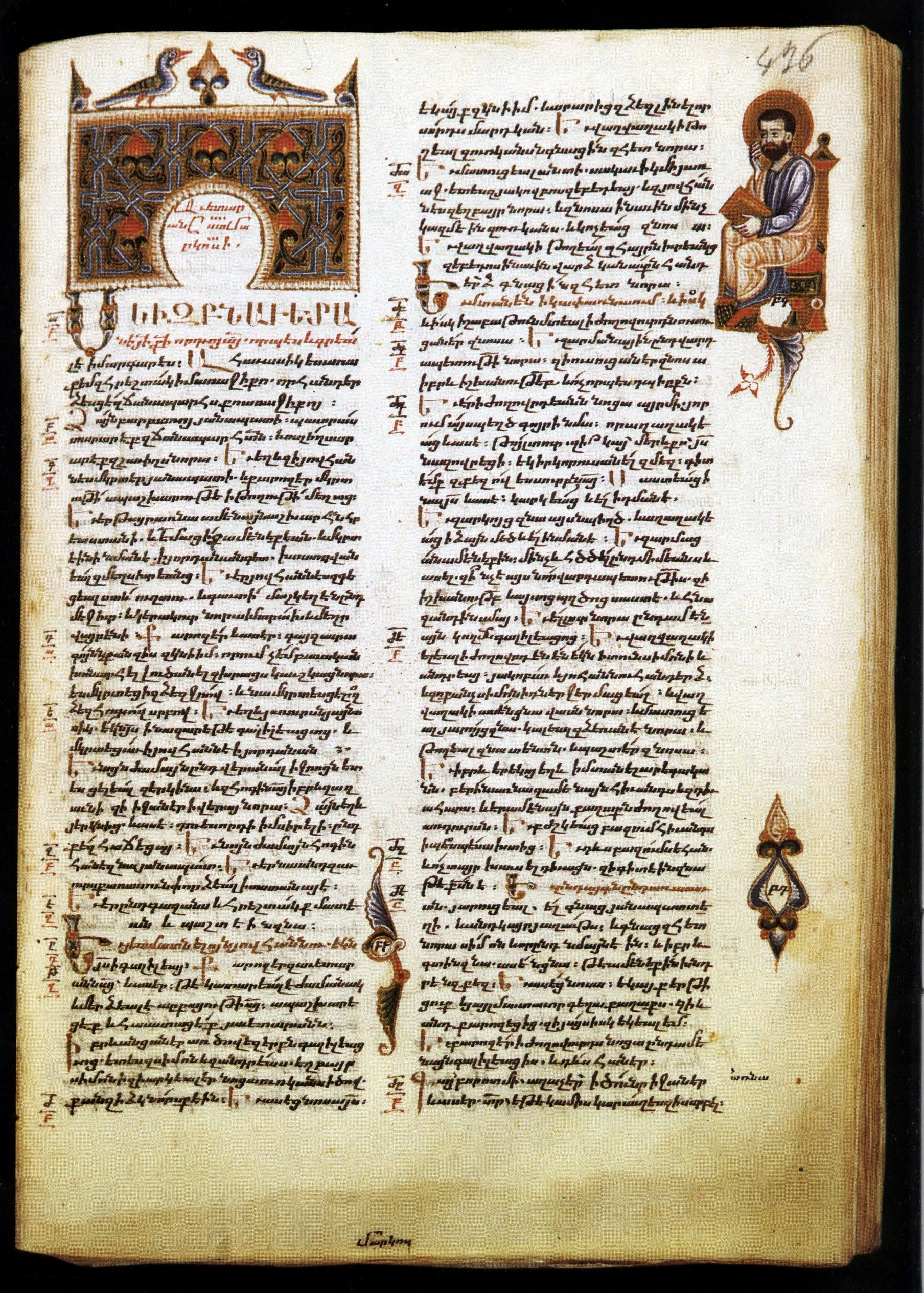
First page of Mark: "The beginning of the gospel of Jesus Christ, the Son of God", by Sargis Pitsak. 14th century.

The Gospel of Mark begins by calling Jesus the Son of God and reaffirms the title twice when a voice from Heaven calls Jesus: "my Son" in Mark 1:11 and Mark 9:7.

In Matthew 14:33, after Jesus walks on water, the disciples tell Jesus: "You really are the Son of God!" In response to the question by Jesus, "But who do you say that I am?", Peter replied: "You are Christ, the Son of the living God". And Jesus answered him, "Blessed are you, Simon Bar-Jonah! For flesh and blood has not revealed this to you, but my Father who is in heaven" (Matthew 16:15–17). In Matthew 27:43, while Jesus hangs on the cross, the Judean leaders mock him to ask God help, "for he said, I am the Son of God", referring to the claim of Jesus to be the Son of God. Matthew 27:54 and Mark 15:39 include the exclamation by the Roman commander: "He was surely the Son of God!" after the earthquake following the Crucifixion of Jesus.

In Luke 1:35, in the Annunciation, before the birth of Jesus, the angel tells Mary that her child "shall be called the Son of God". In Luke 4:41 (and Mark 3:11), when Jesus casts out demons, they fall down before him, and declare: "You are the Son of God."

In John 1:34, John the Baptist bears witness that Jesus is the Son of God and in John 11:27 Martha calls him the Messiah and the Son of God. In several passages in the Gospel of John assertions of Jesus being the Son of God are usually also assertions of his unity with the Father, as in John 14:7–9: "If you know me, then you will also know my Father" and "Whoever has seen me has seen the Father".

In John 19:7, the Jews cry out to Pontius Pilate "Crucify him" based on the charge that Jesus "made himself the Son of God." The charge that Jesus had declared himself "Son of God" was essential to the argument of the Jews from a religious perspective, as the charge that he had called himself King of the Jews was important to Pilate from a political perspective, for it meant possible rebellion against Rome.

Towards the end of the Gospel of John, in John 20:31, the author declares that the purpose for writing it was "that you may believe that Jesus is the Messiah, the Son of God".

In Acts 9:20, after the Conversion of Paul the Apostle, and following his recovery, "straightway in the synagogues he proclaimed Jesus, that he is the Son of God."

=== Synoptic Gospels ===
According to the Synoptic Gospels, Jesus referred to himself obliquely as "the Son" and even more significantly spoke of God as "my Father" (Matthew 11:27 par.; 16:17; Luke 22:29). He not only spoke like "the Son" but also acted like "the Son" in knowing and revealing the truth about God, in changing the divine law, in forgiving sins, in being the one through whom others could become children of God, and in acting with total obedience as the agent for God's final kingdom. This clarifies the charge of blasphemy brought against him at the end (Mark 14:64 par.); he had given the impression of claiming to stand on a par with God. Jesus came across as expressing a unique filial consciousness and as laying claim to a unique filial relationship with the God whom he addressed as "Abba".

=== Gospel of John ===
In the Gospel of John, Jesus is the eternally pre-existent Son who was sent from heaven into the world by God (e.g., John 3:17; 4:34; 5:24–37). He remains conscious of the divine pre-existence he enjoyed with the Father (John 8:23, 8:38–42). He is one with the Father (John 10:30, 14:7) and loved by the Father (John 3:35, 5:20, 10:17, 17:23–26). The Son has the divine power to give life and to judge (John 5:21–26, 6:40, 8:16, 17:2). Through his death, resurrection, and ascension the Son is glorified by the Father (John 17:1–24), but it is not a glory that is thereby essentially enhanced. His glory not only existed from the time of the incarnation to reveal the Father (John 1:14), but also pre-existed the creation of the world (John 17:5–24). Where Paul and the author of Hebrews picture Jesus almost as the elder brother or the first-born of God's new eschatological family (Romans 8:14–29; Hebrews 2:10–12), John insists even more on the clear qualitative difference between Jesus' sonship and that of others. Being God's "only Son" (John 1:14–18, 3:16–18), he enjoys a truly unique and exclusive relationship with the Father.

At least four of these themes go back to the earthly Jesus himself. First, although one has no real evidence for holding that he was humanly aware of his eternal pre-existence as Son, his "Abba-consciousness" revealed an intimate loving relationship with the Father. The full Johannine development of the Father-Son relationship rests on an authentic basis in the Jesus-tradition (Mark 14:36; Matthew 11:25–26; 16:17; Luke 11:2). Second, Jesus not only thought of himself as God's Son, but also spoke of himself as sent by God. Once again, John develops the theme of the Son's mission, which is already present in sayings that at least partly go back to Jesus (Mark 9:37; Matthew 15:24; Luke 10:16), especially in 12:6, where it is a question of the sending of a "beloved Son". Third, the Johannine theme of the Son with power to judge in the context of eternal life finds its original historical source in the sayings of Jesus about his power to dispose of things in the kingdom assigned to him by "my Father" (Luke 22:29–30) and about one's relationship to him deciding one's final destiny before God (Luke 12:8–9). Fourth, albeit less insistently, when inviting his audience to accept a new filial relationship with God, Jesus – as previously seen – distinguished his own relationship to God from theirs. The exclusive Johannine language of God's "only Son" has its real source in Jesus' preaching. All in all, Johannine theology fully deploys Jesus' divine sonship, but does so by building up what one already finds in the Synoptic Gospels and what, at least in part, derives from the earthly Jesus himself.

=== Pauline epistles ===
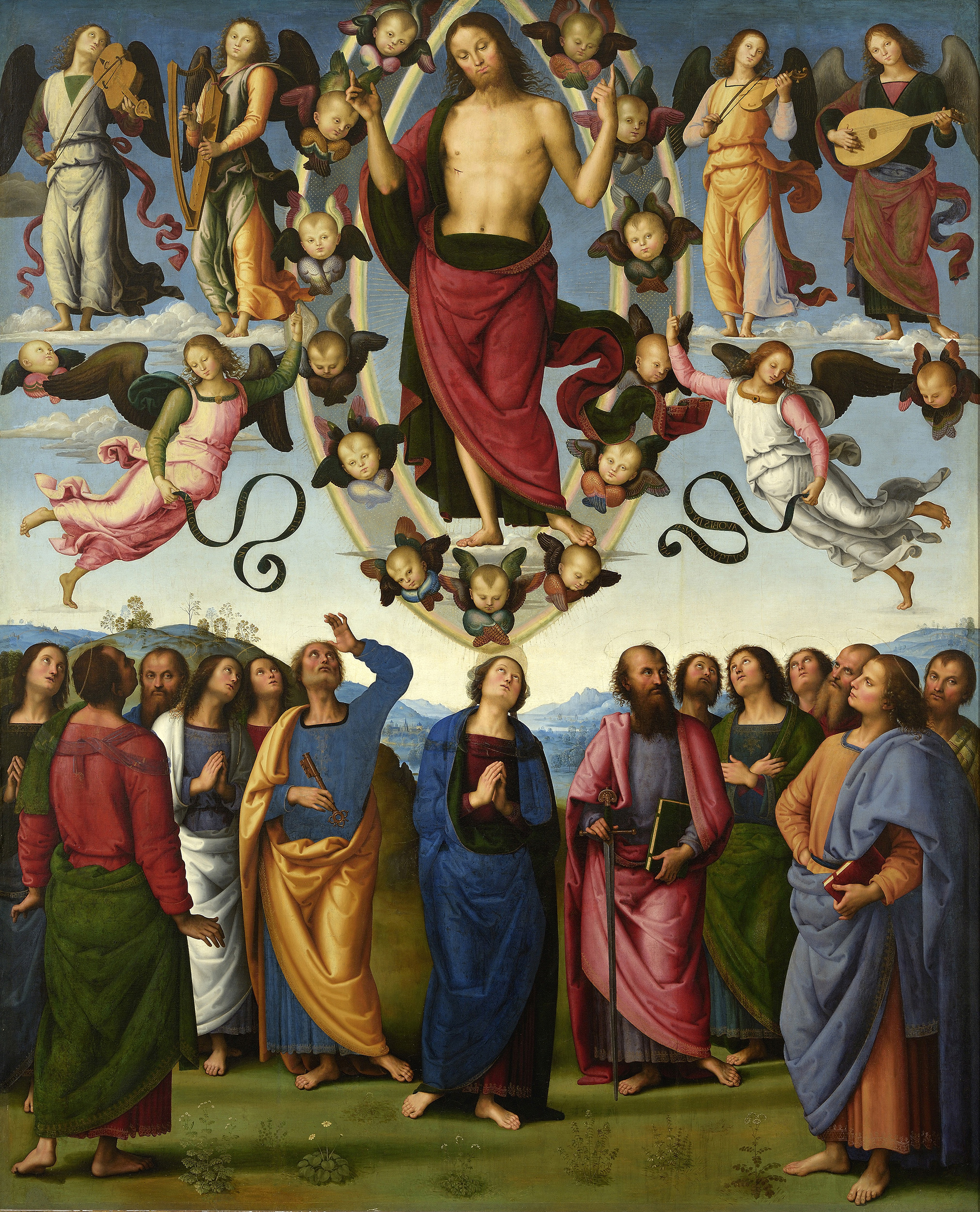
The Ascension, Jesus returning to his Father – by Pietro Perugino (c. 1500), Musée des Beaux-Arts de Lyon

In their own way, the Gospel of John, the First Epistle of John and Paul the Apostle maintain this distinction. Paul expressed their new relationship with God as taking place through an "adoption" (Galatians 4:5; Romans 8:15), which makes them "children of God" (Romans 8:16–17) or, alternatively, "sons of God" (Romans 8:14; (Romans 4:6–7). John distinguished between the only Son of God (John 1:14, 18; John 3:16, 18) and all those who through faith can become "children of God" (John 1:12; 11:52; and 1 John 3:1–2,10 and 5:2. Paul and John likewise maintained and developed the correlative of all this, Jesus' stress on the fatherhood of God. In the Gospel of John, God is given the title of "Father" over 100 times. Paul's typical greeting to his correspondents runs as follows: "Grace to you and peace from God our Father and the/our Lord Jesus Christ". The greeting names Jesus as "Lord", but the context of "God our Father" implies his sonship.

Paul therefore distinguishes between their graced situation as God's adopted children and that of Jesus as Son of God. In understanding the latter's "natural" divine sonship, Paul firstly speaks of God "sending his own Son in the likeness of sinful nature and to deal with sin" (Romans 8:3). In a similar passage, Paul says that "when the fullness of time had come God sent his Son, born of a woman, born under the law" (Galatians 4:4). If one examines these three passages in some detail, it raises the question whether Paul thinks of an eternally pre-existent Son coming into the world from his Father in heaven to set humanity free from sin and death (Romans 8:3, 32) and make it God's adopted children (Galatians 4:4–7). The answer will partly depend, first, on the way one interprets other Pauline passages which do not use the title "Son of God" (2 Corinthians 8:9; Philippians 2:6–11). These latter passages present a pre-existent Christ taking the initiative, through his "generosity" in "becoming poor" for us and "assuming the form of a slave". The answer will, second, depend on whether one judges 1 Corinthians 8:6 and Colossians 1:16 to imply that as a pre-existent being the Son was active at creation. 1 Corinthians 8:6, without explicitly naming "the Son" as such, runs:

There is one God, the Father, from whom are all things and for whom we exist, and one Lord, Jesus Christ, through whom are all things and through whom we exist.

— 1 Corinthians 8:6, New Revised Standard Version

Calling God "the Father" clearly moves one toward talk of "the Son". In the case of Colossians 1:16, the whole hymn (Colossians 1:15–20) does not give Jesus any title. However, he has just been referred to in Colossians 1:13 as God's "beloved Son".

Third, it should be observed that the language of "sending" (or, for that matter, "coming" with its stress on personal purpose (Mark 10:45 par.; Luke 12:49, 51 par.) by itself does not necessarily imply pre-existence. Otherwise one would have to ascribe pre-existence to John the Baptist, "a man sent from God", who "came to bear witness to the light" (John 1:6–8; cf. Matthew 11:10, 18 par.). In the Old Testament, angelic and human messengers, especially prophets, were "sent" by God, but the prophets sent by God were never called God's sons. It makes a difference that in the cited Pauline passages it was God's Son who was sent. Here being "sent" by God means more than merely receiving a divine commission and includes coming from a heavenly pre-existence and enjoying a divine origin. Fourth, in their context, the three Son of God passages here examined (Romans 8:3, 32; Galatians 4:4) certainly do not focus on the Son's pre-existence, but on his being sent or given up to free human beings from sin and death, to make them God's adopted children, and to let them live (and pray) with the power of the indwelling Spirit. Nevertheless, the Apostle's soteriology presupposes here a Christology that includes divine pre-existence. It is precisely because Christ is the pre-existent Son who comes from the Father that he can turn human beings into God's adopted sons and daughters.

=== Jesus' own assertions ===
When in Matthew 16:15–17, Peter states: "You are Christ, the Son of the living God", Jesus not only accepts the titles, but calls Peter "blessed" because his declaration had been revealed to him by "my Father who is in Heaven". According to John Yieh, in this account the Gospel of Matthew is unequivocally stating this as the church's view of Jesus.

In the Sanhedrin trial of Jesus in Mark 14:61, when the high priest asked Jesus: "Are you the Messiah, the Son of the Blessed One?" In the next verse, Jesus responded "I am". Jesus' claim here was emphatic enough to make the high priest tear his robe.

In the new Testament Jesus uses the term "my Father" as a direct and unequivocal assertion of his sonship, and a unique relationship with the Father beyond any attribution of titles by others:

- In Matthew 11:27 Jesus claims a direct relationship to God the Father: "No one knows the Son except the Father and no one knows the Father except the Son", asserting the mutual knowledge he has with the Father.
- In John 5:23 he claims that the Son and the Father receive the same type of honor, stating: "so that all may honor the Son, just as they honor the Father".
- In John 5:26 he claims to possess life as the Father does: "Just as the Father has life in himself, so also he gave to his Son the possession of life in himself".

In a number of other episodes Jesus claims sonship by referring to the Father, e.g. in Luke 2:49 when he is found in the temple a young Jesus calls the temple "my Father's house", just as he does later in John 2:16 in the Cleansing of the Temple episode. In Matthew 3:17 and Luke 3:22 Jesus allows himself to be called the Son of God by the voice from above, not objecting to the title.

References to "my Father" by Jesus in the New Testament are distinguished in that he never includes other individuals in them and only refers to "his Father", however when addressing the disciples he uses "your Father", excluding himself from the reference.

== See also ==
- Names and titles of Jesus in the New Testament
- Divine filiation
- Jesus in Manichaeism
