= Matthew 27:52 =

- ← 27:51 27:53 →
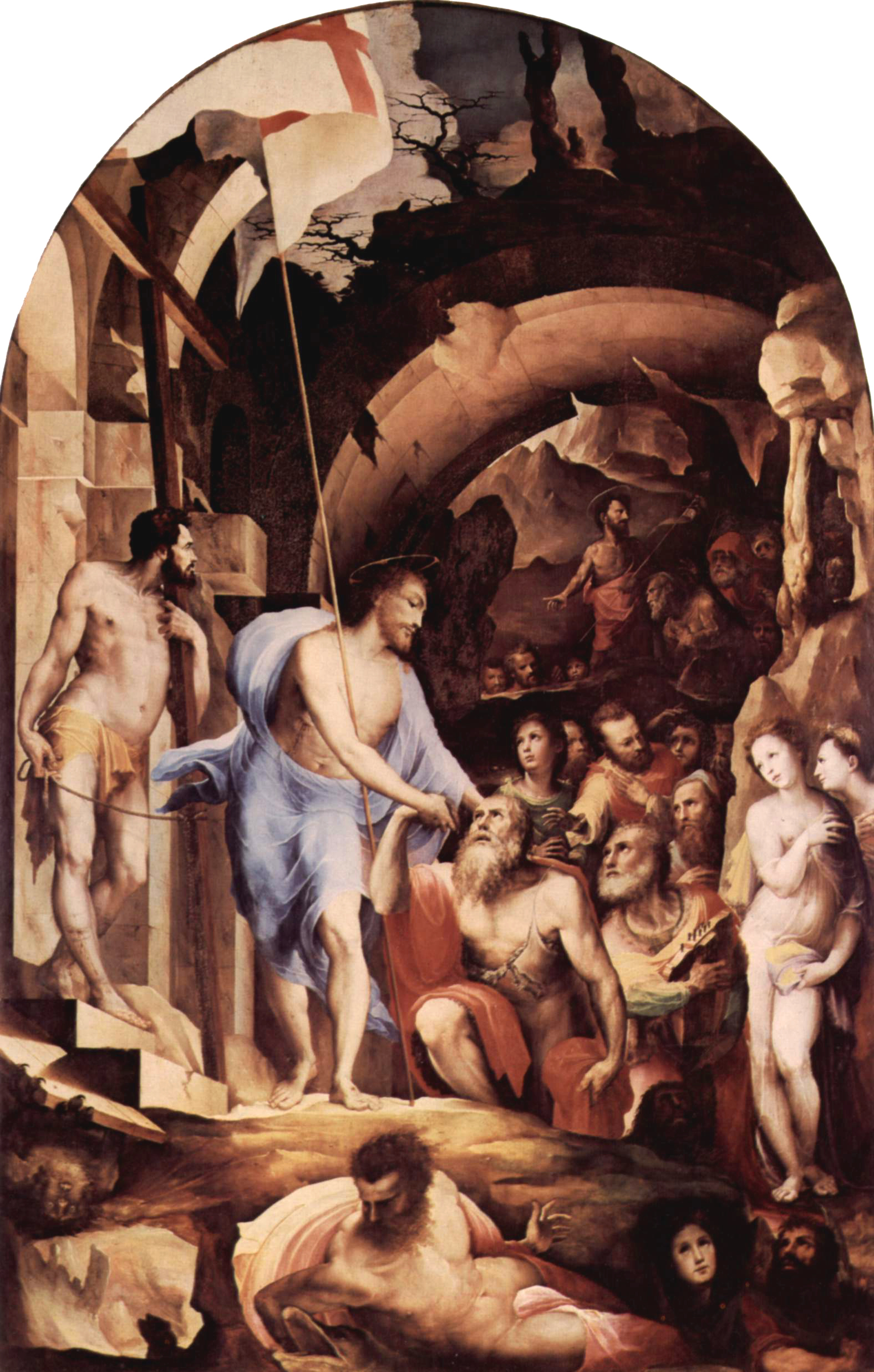
- Domenico Beccafumi's depiction of Jesus leading the patriarchs out of limbo, c.1530-1535
- Book: Gospel of Matthew
- Christian Bible part: New Testament

Matthew 27:52 is the fifty-second verse of the twenty-seventh chapter of the Gospel of Matthew in the New Testament. This verse describes some of the events that occurred upon death of Jesus, particularly the report that tombs broke open and the saints inside were resurrected.

== Content ==
The original Koine Greek, according to Westcott and Hort, reads:

καὶ τὰ μνημεῖα ἀνεῴχθησαν καὶ πολλὰ σώματα τῶν κεκοιμημένων ἁγίων ἠγέρθησαν,

In the King James Version of the Bible, it is translated as:

And the graves were opened; and many bodies of the saints which slept arose,

The modern World English Bible translates the passage as:

The tombs were opened, and many bodies of the saints who had fallen asleep were raised. (Note: For a collection of other versions see BibleHub Matthew 27:52)

== Analysis ==
The raising of holy people who had died points to 'the resurrection of the last days' (Isaiah 26:19; Daniel 12:2) which starts with Jesus' resurrection. It is only reported in Matthew, tied to the tearing of the temple curtain as the result of the earthquake noted in verse 51. The temple area is located on a geological fault, and the tremors from time to time cause damage to the buildings until the modern times.

Johann Bengel suggests that the "saints" or "holy people" were "those who had died either a long while before the birth of Christ, or not much after".

There is no parallel record to this event in other gospels or contemporary documents, and the account in Matthew does not have enough detail; for example, no explanation is given for the delay between the opening of the tombs on the day of Jesus' death and the appearance of raised holy people in Jerusalem after Jesus' resurrection, so the story is mainly taken for its fairly clear symbolism. The words of Matthew recall the text of Ezekiel 37:13, "when I open your graves and bring you up out of your graves, my people", and "the earthquake-like imagery" in Ezekiel 37:7. Nonetheless, these signs were surely known by many, that Paul could say to King Agrippa, "this thing was not done in a corner" (Acts 26:26).

Some explain the incident as referring to the grave physically opening itself up, after the gravestones broke apart from the earthquake. This was done to anticipate the resurrection of Jesus and the dead three days later.

== Sources ==
- France, R. T. (1994). "Matthew". In Carson, D. A.; France, R. T.; Motyer, J. A.; Wenham, G. J. (eds.). New Bible Commentary: 21st Century Edition (4, illustrated, reprint, revised ed.). Inter-Varsity Press. pp. 904–945. ISBN 9780851106489.
- France, R.T. (2007). Bruce, Frederick Fyvie (ed.). The Gospel of Matthew. New international commentary on the New Testament. Wm. B. Eerdmans Publishing. ISBN 9780802825018.

Preceded by Matthew 27:51	Gospel of Matthew; Chapter 27	Succeeded by Matthew 27:53
