= Matthew 27:53 =

- ← 27:52 27:54 →
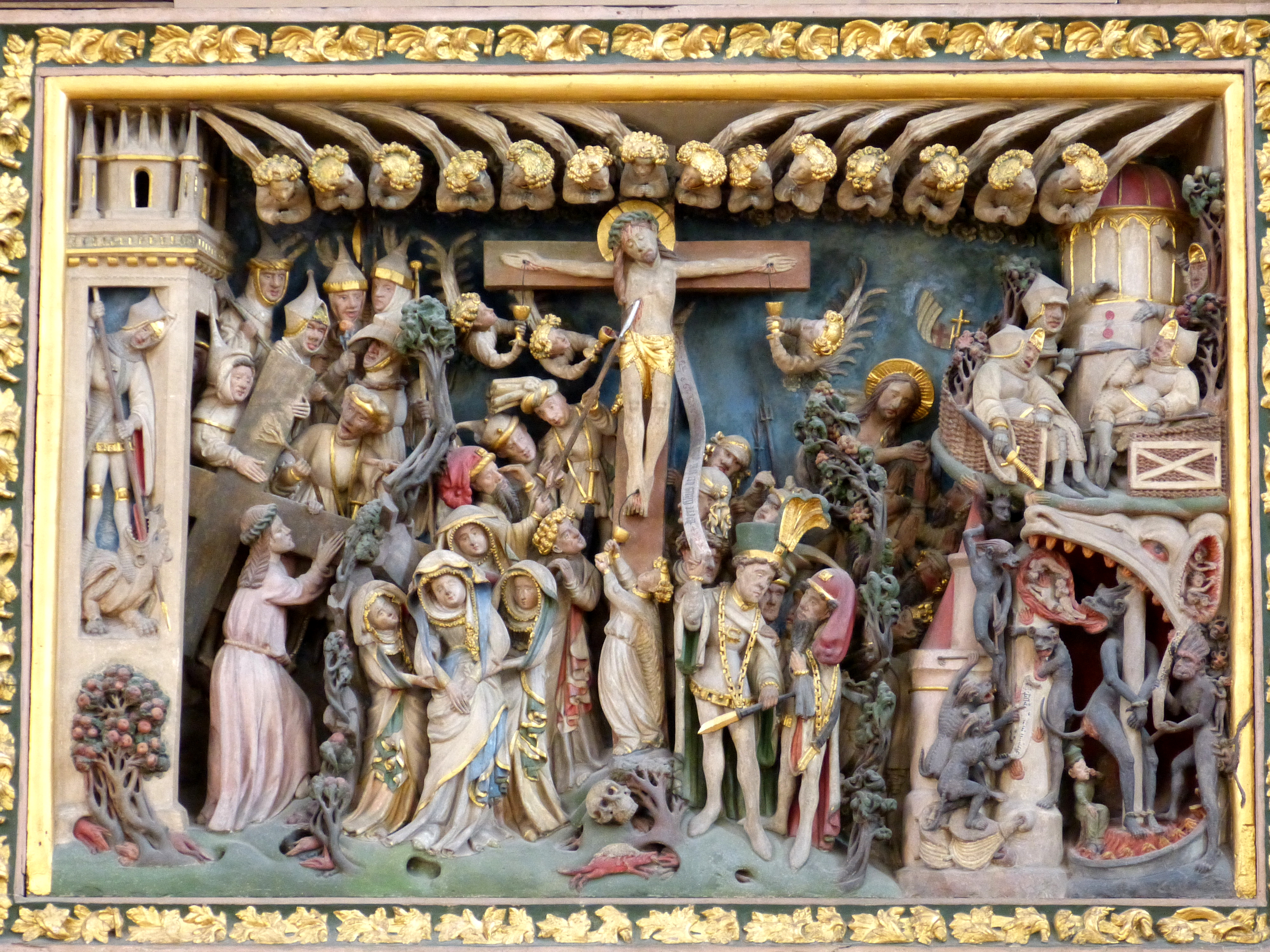
- Schwerin Cathedral ( Mecklenburg ). Gothic polyptich ( 15th century ) - Sandstone relief ( 1420s ) showing the bearing of the cross, crucifixion and harrowing of hell.
- Book: Gospel of Matthew
- Christian Bible part: New Testament

Matthew 27:53 is the fifty-third verse of the twenty-seventh chapter of the Gospel of Matthew in the New Testament. This verse describes some of the events that occurred upon the death of Jesus. The previous verse mentioned that tombs broke open and the saints inside were resurrected. In this verse, the saints descend upon the Holy City.

== Content ==
The verse in Koine Greek, according to NA28, reads:

καὶ ἐξελθόντες ἐκ τῶν μνημείων μετὰ τὴν ἔγερσιν αὐτοῦ
εἰσῆλθον εἰς τὴν ἁγίαν πόλιν καὶ ἐνεφανίσθησαν πολλοῖς

In the King James Version of the Bible, it is translated as:

and [the bodies of the saints] came out of the graves after his resurrection,
and went into the holy city, and appeared unto many.

== Analysis ==
These verses see the resurrection of "many" saints, and their appearance in the city where they are seen by "many." The concern that Biblical scholars have had for centuries with this story, is that these momentous events are mentioned nowhere else. Not only are they not noticed by any contemporary non-Christian sources, but none of the other gospel writers mentions this occurring.

The text also makes no note of why there is a two-day delay between the opening of the tombs upon Jesus' death and the saints' appearance in the city only after Jesus' resurrection. If these events only happen two days hence, why are they mentioned here and not with the miraculous events of the resurrection in Matthew 28:2? Some later manuscripts have "after their resurrection" rather than "his," rearranging the timeline. Schweizer speculates that this verse contains an ancient correction to Matthew's original manuscript. Theologically Jesus had to be the first person resurrected, so Schweizer believes the wording of this verse was switched to ensure the saints only rose after Jesus.

Most modern scholars thus do not consider these events to be historical. Bultmann refers to them as "pure novelistic motifs." Hagnar states that these events make more theological than historical sense. Brown comments that the strength of this part of the narrative is "atmosphere, not details." There have been attempts to reconcile this verse with other sources. One proposition is that by the "holy city" Matthew is not referring to Jerusalem, but rather to heaven. The saints thus appeared only in heaven, explaining why no other source makes note of this event. Most scholars reject this understanding, as "holy city" has referred to Jerusalem throughout Matthew's gospel (such as in Matthew 4:5). The theory also fails to explain what is meant when Matthew states they were "seen by many." Others also note that the Biblical text does not explicitly tell how these resurrected saints appeared and to whom, along with how they disappeared. Thus, one cannot draw a definitive conclusion from the text. Nolland, however, speculates that the saints were translated directly to heaven after a short time on Earth, similar to Elijah.

== Sources ==
- France, R.T. (2007). The Gospel of Matthew. Wm. B. Eerdmans Publishing.
- Keener, Craig S (2009). The Gospel of Matthew: A Socio-Rhetorical Commentary. Wm. B. Eerdmans Publishing.

Preceded by Matthew 27:52	Gospel of Matthew; Chapter 27	Succeeded by Matthew 27:54
