= John of Glastonbury =

John of Glastonbury (fl. c. 1340) was a Benedictine monk and chronicler. His full name may have been John Seen.

In the mid fourteenth century John wrote the Cronica Sive Antiquitates Glastoniensis Ecclesie (Chronicles or Antiquities of the Glastonbury Church) which is a chronicle of Glastonbury Abbey, from when it was founded, up to the period of John's life. The Cronica survives as a full text over seven manuscripts. The Cronica refers to the Arthurian legends several times, and John drew extensively on De Antiquitate Glastonie Ecclesie by William of Malmesbury.

== See also ==
- Prophecy of Melkin

== Bibliography ==
- Echard, Siân (1998). Arthurian Narrative in the Latin Tradition. Cambridge University Press. ISBN 978-0-521-62126-7.
- Luxford, Julian M. (2008). The Art and Architecture of English Benedictine Monasteries, 1300-1540: A Patronage History. Boydell Press. ISBN 978-1-84383-153-2.
- Kennedy, Edward D. (2005). "Visions of History: Robert de Boron and English Arthurian Chroniclers". In Lacy, Norris J. (ed.). The Fortunes of King Arthur. D.S.Brewer. pp. 29–46. ISBN 978-1-84384-061-9.
- of Glastonbury, John (1985). Carley, James P. (ed.). Cronica Sive Antiquitates Glastoniensis Ecclesie: Chronicle of Glastonbury Abbey. Boydell Press. ISBN 978-0-85115-409-1.
