= Matthew 27:54 =

- ← 27:53 27:55 →
- Lucas Cranach the Elder's The Crucifixion with the Converted Centurion, 1536
- Book: Gospel of Matthew
- Christian Bible part: New Testament

Matthew 27:54 is the fifty-fourth verse of the twenty-seventh chapter of the Gospel of Matthew in the New Testament. This verse follows immediately after the death of Jesus and describes the reaction of the Roman soldiers present.

== Content ==
The original Koine Greek, according to Westcott and Hort, reads:

ο δε εκατονταρχος και οι μετ αυτου τηρουντες τον ιησουν ιδοντες τον σεισμον
και τα γινομενα εφοβηθησαν σφοδρα λεγοντες αληθως θεου υιος ην ουτος

In the King James Version of the Bible it is translated as:

Now when the centurion, and they that were with him, watching
Jesus, saw the earthquake, and those things that were done,
they feared greatly, saying, Truly this was the Son of God.

The modern World English Bible translates the passage as:

Now the centurion, and those who were with him watching Jesus,
when they saw the earthquake, and the things that were done,
feared exceedingly, saying, "Truly this was the Son of God."

For a collection of other versions see BibleHub Matthew 27:54

== Analysis ==
This verse is based on Mark 15:39, though the author of Matthew makes some modifications. Mention is added of the earthquake, which is not part of Mark's crucifixion narrative. In this verse the earthquake seems to be the prime motivator of the centurion's fear. At the location on Golgotha it would have been impossible to see the damage to the Temple or the rising of the dead. Matthew also adds mention of the soldiers' great fear, and addition that also appears at Matthew 17:6, at a similar demonstration of Jesus' miraculous powers. Matthew also increases the number of people from a single centurion to include his soldiers as well. A multitude of soldiers has been interpreted as foreshadowing of the masses of gentiles who would soon join the Jesus movement. France also notes that an increase of numbers is also legally important, as a single witness would not be enough before a court to verify what had occurred.

The soldiers were early mentioned as keeping watch over the crucifixion at Matthew 5:36. This verse highlights their leader, a centurion. It is the second time a centurion appears in Matthew, the previous time being the healing the Centurion's servant in Matthew 8. The soldiers had been present for the torture and mockery of Jesus, such as the King of the Jews sign at Matthew 27:37. The proclamation in this verse thus shows that they now realize the error of their ways.

Son of God is a central term in the New Testament and in modern Christianity, and one that has recurred in Matthew's gospel. In Matthew 3:17 he was proclaimed such by God at his baptism, and the call is repeated at 17:5. Jesus has also been called such by demons, Satan, himself, and his disciples. This verse is important as it is the first time any person outside Jesus' own circle refers to him as such.

There are alternate understandings of this verse, beyond the conversion of the gentiles to Christianity. One alternative is that this is a cry of defeat rather than of conversion. The evil gentiles are overcome and defeated rather than won over. The verse might not thus represent the opening up of the mission to non-Jews. The Roman soldiers were pagans, which can also imply a different understanding of the title "Son of God." The original Greek does not contain an article, so this verse can be read equally as referring to "the Son of God" or "a Son of God." In Roman mythology gods frequently interacted with the world and had many semi-divine children. Thus the soldiers might not be understanding Jesus in the modern Christian sense, but in a Roman religious sense.

"Son of god," or divi filius, was also one of the standard titles used by the Roman emperors. A title that would have been well known by the original readers of the gospel. Thus this verse can also be read as an attack on the cult of the emperor, and thus on the Empire itself. The phrasing in this verse corresponds more closely to official Roman usage than do most of the proclamations of Jesus' divine origins elsewhere in Matthew.

== Bibliography ==
- France, R.T. (2007). The Gospel of Matthew. Wm. B. Eerdmans. ISBN 9780802825018.

Preceded by Matthew 27:53	Gospel of Matthew; Chapter 27	Succeeded by Matthew 27:55
