= Tektōn =

Ancient Greek term for an artisan/craftsman

The Ancient Greek noun tektōn (τέκτων) is a common term for an artisan or craftsman, in particular a carpenter, woodworker, or builder. The term is frequently contrasted with an ironworker, or smith (χαλκεύς) and stone-worker or mason (λιθολόγος, λαξευτής).

== Etymology ==
Tektōn (τέκτων) is derived from the Proto-Indo-European root *tetḱ-, which means "to carve, to chisel, to mold." It is comparable to the Sanskrit takṣan, literally "wood-cutter".

"Architect" derives from ἀρχιτέκτων (arkhitéktōn, "master builder", "chief tektōn).

== Septuagint ==
The characteristic Ancient Greek distinction between the general worker or wood-worker and the stonemason and the metal-worker occurs frequently in the Septuagint:

So the carpenter (tektōn) encouraged the goldsmith, and he that smootheth with the hammer him that smote the anvil, saying, ...

— Isaiah 41:7

The distinction occurs in lists of workmen working on building or repairs to the temple in Jerusalem, for example in the repairs carried out under the priest Jehoiada and "the carpenters and builders, that wrought upon the house of the LORD,... And to masons, and hewers of stone, and to buy timber and hewed stone to repair the breaches of the house of the LORD", in 2 Kings 12:11–12. This same incident is recounted in similar language, using tektōn again, in the account of Josephus.

However, in the Septuagint, tektōn is especially broad and vague; a modifier is often necessary to disambiguate the term. This is likely due to the influence of the broad Hebrew term חָרָשׁ on the Greek translation (LXX). Thus, tektōn in the Septuagint can only be specifically defined (i.e. woodworker, blacksmith, etc.) via an accompanying modifier or contextual clues.

== New Testament ==
=== Gospel references ===
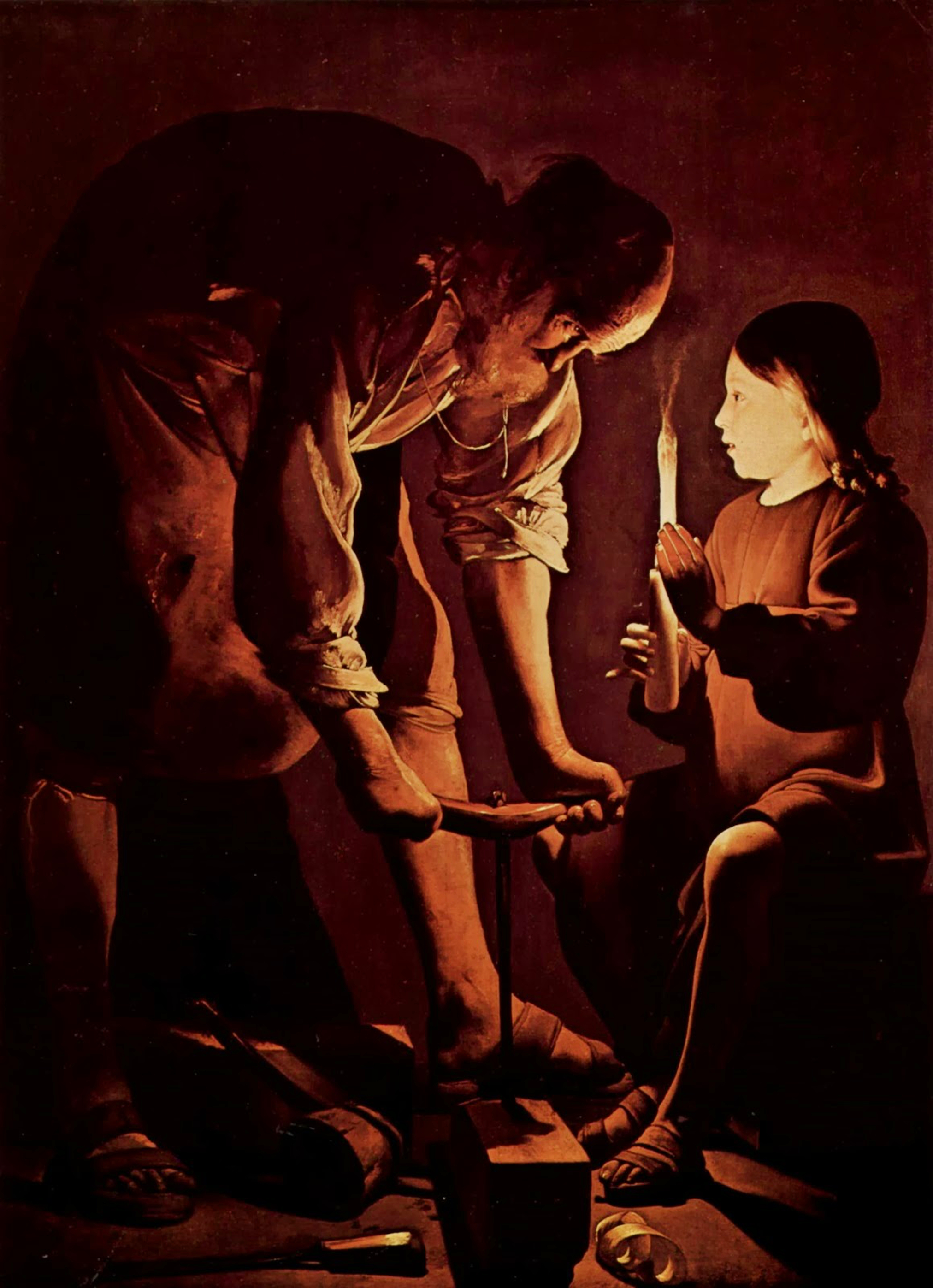
Jesus in the workshop of Joseph the Carpenter, by Georges de La Tour, 1640s.

The term is chiefly notable for New Testament commentators' discussion of the employment of Jesus and his father Joseph, both described as tektōn in the New Testament. This is translated as "carpenter" in English-language Bibles.

The term occurs in combination with the definite article in Mark 6:3 to describe the occupation of Jesus.

Is not this the carpenter (ho tektōn) the son of Mary and brother of James and Joses and Judas and Simon, and are not his sisters here with us?

A variant text for this appears in the Gospel of Matthew in relation to Jesus' adoptive father Joseph.

Is not this the carpenter's son (ho tou tektōnos huios)? Is not his mother called Mary? And are not his brothers James and Joseph and Simon and Judas? And are not all his sisters with us?

In modern scholarship, the word has sometimes been re-interpreted from the traditional meaning of carpenter and has sometimes been translated as craftsman, as the meaning of builder is implied, but can be applied to both wood-work and stone masonry. In his 2021 Neotestamentica article, Matthew K. Robinson argues that, due to its vagueness (particularly in light of influence from the LXX), tektōn in Mark 6:3 should be translated according to contextual clues. Referencing ancient literature and recent archeological evidence, Robinson posits that the best translation for tektōn is "builder-craftsman."

=== Hebrew naggar interpretation ===
In the Septuagint, the Greek noun tektōn either stands for the generic Hebrew noun kharash (חרש), "craftsman," (as Isaiah 41:7) or tekton xylon (τέκτων ξύλον) as a word-for-word rendering of kharash-'etsim (חָרַשׁ עֵצִים) "craftsman of woods." (as Isaiah 44:13). The term kharash occurs 33 times in the Masoretic Text of the Hebrew Bible.

As an alternative to kharash, some authors have speculated that the Greek term corresponds to the Aramaic term naggara (Hebrew נגר, naggar, "craftsman") and in 1983 Geza Vermes, biblical scholar, suggested that given that the use of the term in the Talmud "carpenter" can signify a very learned man, the New Testament description of Joseph as a carpenter could indicate that he was considered wise and literate in the Torah. This theory was later popularized by writer A. N. Wilson to suggest that Jesus had some sort of elevated status.

The original text with "There is no carpenter or son of carpenter that can take it apart" is found in Avodah Zarah 50b in discussion of whether to prune a tree on the Sabbath, with "carpenter" used in Isidore Epstein (Soncino) and Michael Rodkinson's translations and Ezra Zion Melamed's Lexicon. In the modern English version of the Talmud by academic Jacob Neusner, the passage reads as follows:

1.5 A. Said R. Joseph bar Abba ... "people may remove worms from a tree or patch the bark with dung during the Sabbatical Year, but people may not remove worms or patch the bark during the intermediate days of a festival. ... But there is no craftsman let alone a disciple of a craftsman who can unravel this teaching." B. Said Rabina, "I am not a craftsman let alone a disciple of a craftsman, but I can unravel this teaching. What is the problem anyhow? ..."

However, the Greek term tektōn does not carry this meaning, and the nearest equivalent in the New Testament is Paul's comparison to Timothy of a "workman" (ἐργάτης, ergatēs) rightly "dividing" the word of truth. This has been taken as carpentry imagery by some Christian commentators. The suggested term naggar ("craftsman") is not found in biblical Aramaic or Hebrew, or in Aramaic documents of the New Testament period, but is found in later Talmudic texts where the term "craftsman" is used as a metaphor for a skilled handler of the word of God.
