= Centre for Open Learning, University of Edinburgh =

Coordinates: 55.950°N 3.180°W

Centre for Open Learning
- Affiliations: University of Edinburgh
- Location: Edinburgh, Scotland
- Campus: Holyrood Campus
- Website: www.ed.ac.uk/lifelong-learning

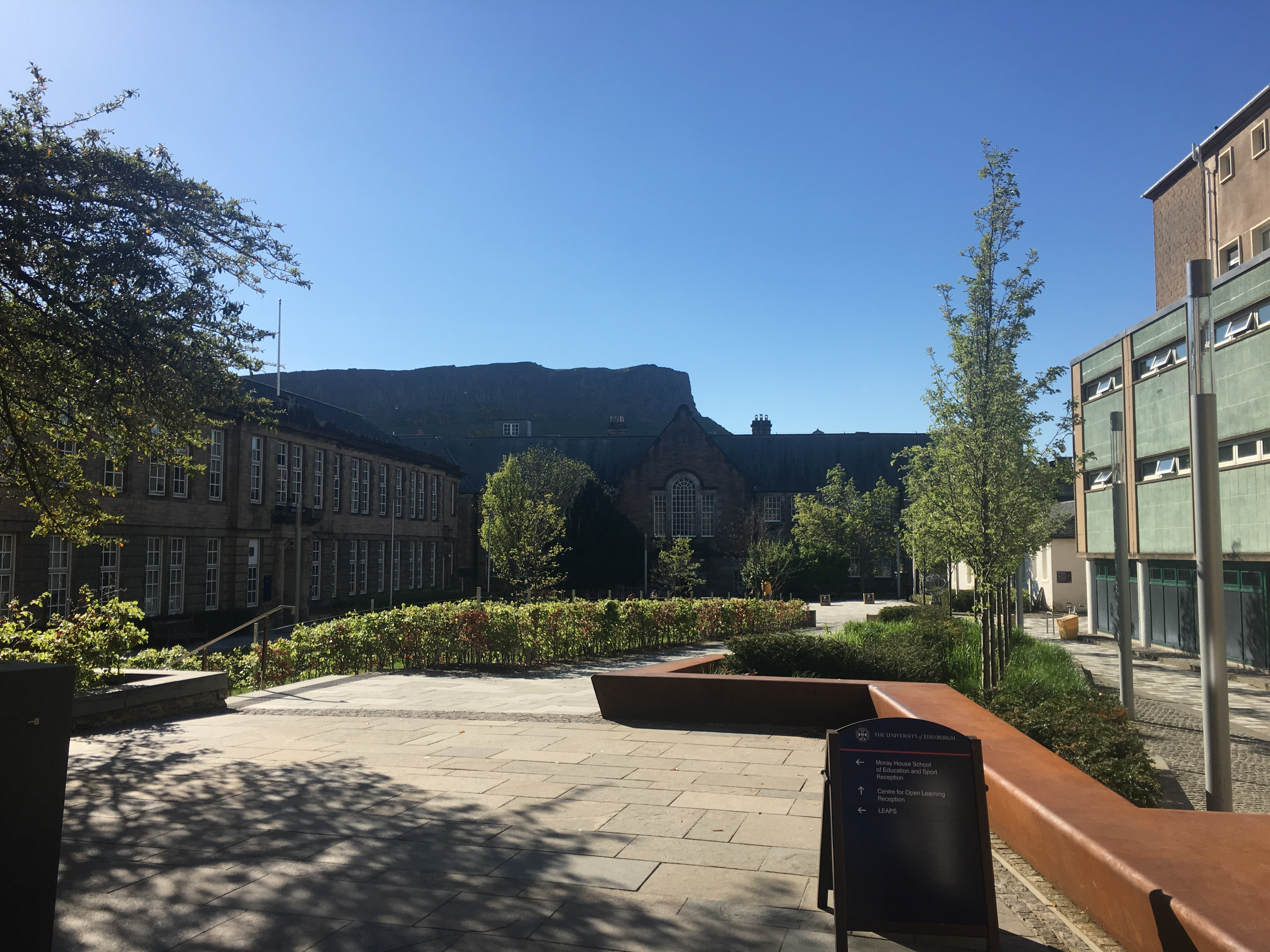

The Centre for Open Learning (COL) is a department within the College of Arts, Humanities and Social Sciences at the University of Edinburgh in Scotland.

== History ==
The Office of Lifelong Learning (OLL) was a school within the College of Humanities and Social Science. The buildings of the Office of Lifelong Learning were located on Buccleuch Place in the Central Campus adjacent to George Square in Edinburgh. In 2012, the Centre moved to its current location at Paterson's Land on the university's Holyrood Campus.

In 2008, OLL merged with the Institute of Applied Language Studies. In 2011, the English Language Teaching Centre joined the centre. In April 2016, it was renamed the Centre for Open Learning.
