= Gordon Strachan (minister) =

Scottish minister

- Born: 24 January 1934; Cheam, England, United Kingdom
- Died: 7 July 2010 (aged 76); Edinburgh, Scotland, United Kingdom
- Occupations: Minister, theologian, lecturer, author
- Spouse: Elspeth
- Children: Christopher
- Theological work
- Language: English

Charles Gordon Strachan (24 January 1934 – 7 July 2010) was a Church of Scotland minister, theologian, university lecturer and author. He was regarded as a radical thinker with unorthodox views, such as his claim that Jesus may have travelled to Britain during his lost years to study with the Druids.

After attending St Edward's School, Oxford, Strachan went on to graduate with a degree in history from the University of Oxford, and a PhD in theology from New College, Edinburgh. The subject of his doctoral thesis was Edward Irving, a 19th-century Scottish divine denounced as a heretic. Strachan was active in the Iona Community, taught courses at the Office of Lifelong Learning and lectured in the Department of Architecture at the University of Edinburgh.

Strachan wrote a number of books including Jesus the Master Builder: Druid Mysteries and the Dawn of Christianity, which was the basis of a 45-minute documentary titled And Did Those Feet (2009) by Ted Harrison.

== Bibliography ==
- Pentecostal Theology of Edward Irving (1973)
- Freeing the Feminine (1985), co-authored with his wife Elspeth
- Christ and the Cosmos (1985), later republished as The Bible's Hidden Cosmology (2005)
- Jesus the Master Builder: Druid Mysteries and the Dawn of Christianity (1998)
- Chartres: Sacred Geometry, Sacred Space (2003)
- The Return of Merlin: Star Lore and the Patterns of History (2006)
- Prophets of Nature: Green Spirituality in Romantic Poetry and Painting (2008)
