= The Lost Books of the Bible and the Forgotten Books of Eden =

English translations of pseudepigrapha and apocryphon

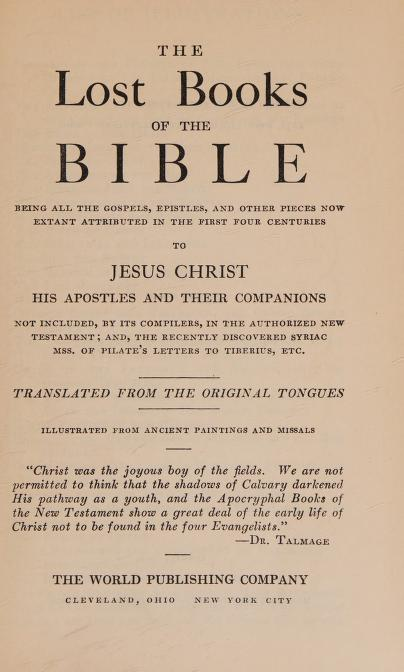
- Genre: Theology
- Publication date: 1926

The Lost Books of the Bible and the Forgotten Books of Eden (1926) is a collection of 17th-century and 18th-century English translations of some Old Testament Pseudepigrapha and New Testament Apocrypha, some of which were assembled in the 1820s, and then republished with the current title in 1926.

"The Lost books of the Bible" included an introduction written by Dr. Frank Crane.

== History of the translations ==
Rutherford Hayes Platt, in the preface to his 1964 reprint of The Lost Books of the Bible and the Forgotten Books of Eden states:

"First issued in 1926, this is the most popular collection of apocryphal and pseudepigraphical literature ever published."

The translations were first published, under this title, by an unknown editor in The Lost Books of the Bible Cleveland 1926, but the translations had previously been published many times.

The book is, essentially, a combined reprint of earlier works. The first half, Lost Books of the Bible, is an unimproved reprint of a book published by William Hone in 1820, titled The Apocryphal New Testament, itself a reprint of a translation of the Apostolic Fathers done in 1693 by William Wake, who later became the Archbishop of Canterbury, and a smattering of medieval embellishments on the New Testament, from a book by Jeremiah Jones (1693–1724), posthumously published in 1736. In the three centuries since these were originally published, a great deal more is known about the Apostolic Fathers (including a good deal of the original text that was not available in 1693) and New Testament Apocrypha.

The second half of the book, The Forgotten Books of Eden, includes a translation originally published in 1882 of the "First and Second Books of Adam and Eve", translated first from ancient Ethiopic to German by Ernest Trumpp and then into English by Solomon Caesar Malan, and a number of items of Old Testament pseudepigrapha, such as reprinted in the second volume of R.H. Charles's Apocrypha and Pseudepigrapha of the Old Testament (Oxford, 1913).

More modern translations of these works include J. H. Charlesworth, ed. Old Testament Pseudepigrapha; W. Schneemelcher, ed. New Testament Apocrypha; and M. R. James, The Apocryphal New Testament.

== The Lost Books of the Bible ==
♦ = attributed to the Apostolic Fathers

- The Book of Mary
- The book of Enoch
- The Protevangelion
- The Gospel of the Infancy of Jesus Christ
- The Infancy Gospel of Thomas
- The Book of Jesus Christ
- The Gospel of Nicodemus (Acts of Pilate)
- The Apostles' Creed (throughout history)
- The Epistle of Paul the Apostle to the Laodiceans
- The Epistles of Paul the Apostle to Seneca, with Seneca's to Paul
- The Acts of Paul and Thecla
- ♦ The Epistles of Clement (The First and Second Epistles of Clement to the Corinthians)
- ♦ The Epistle of Barnabas
- ♦ The Epistle of Ignatius to the Ephesians
- ♦ The Epistle of Ignatius to the Magnesians
- ♦ The Epistle of Ignatius to the Trallians
- ♦ The Epistle of Ignatius to the Romans
- ♦ The Epistle of Ignatius to the Philadelphians
- ♦ The Epistle of Ignatius to the Smyrneans
- ♦ The Epistle of Ignatius to Polycarp
- ♦ The Shepherd of Hermas (Visions, Commands, and Similitudes)
- Letter of Herod To Pilate the Governor
- Letter of Pilate to Herod
- The Lost Gospel of Peter
- ♦ The Epistle of Polycarp to the Philippians
- The History of Susana

== Contents of The Forgotten Books of Eden ==
- The Conflict of Adam and Eve with Satan (The First and Second Book of Adam and Eve)
- The Secrets of Enoch (also known as the Slavonic Enoch or Second Enoch)
- The Psalms of Solomon
- The Odes of Solomon
- The Letter of Aristeas
- The Fourth Book of Maccabees
- The Story of Ahikar
- Testaments of the Twelve Patriarchs
