= Ascension of Isaiah =

Pseudepigraphical Judeo-Christian text

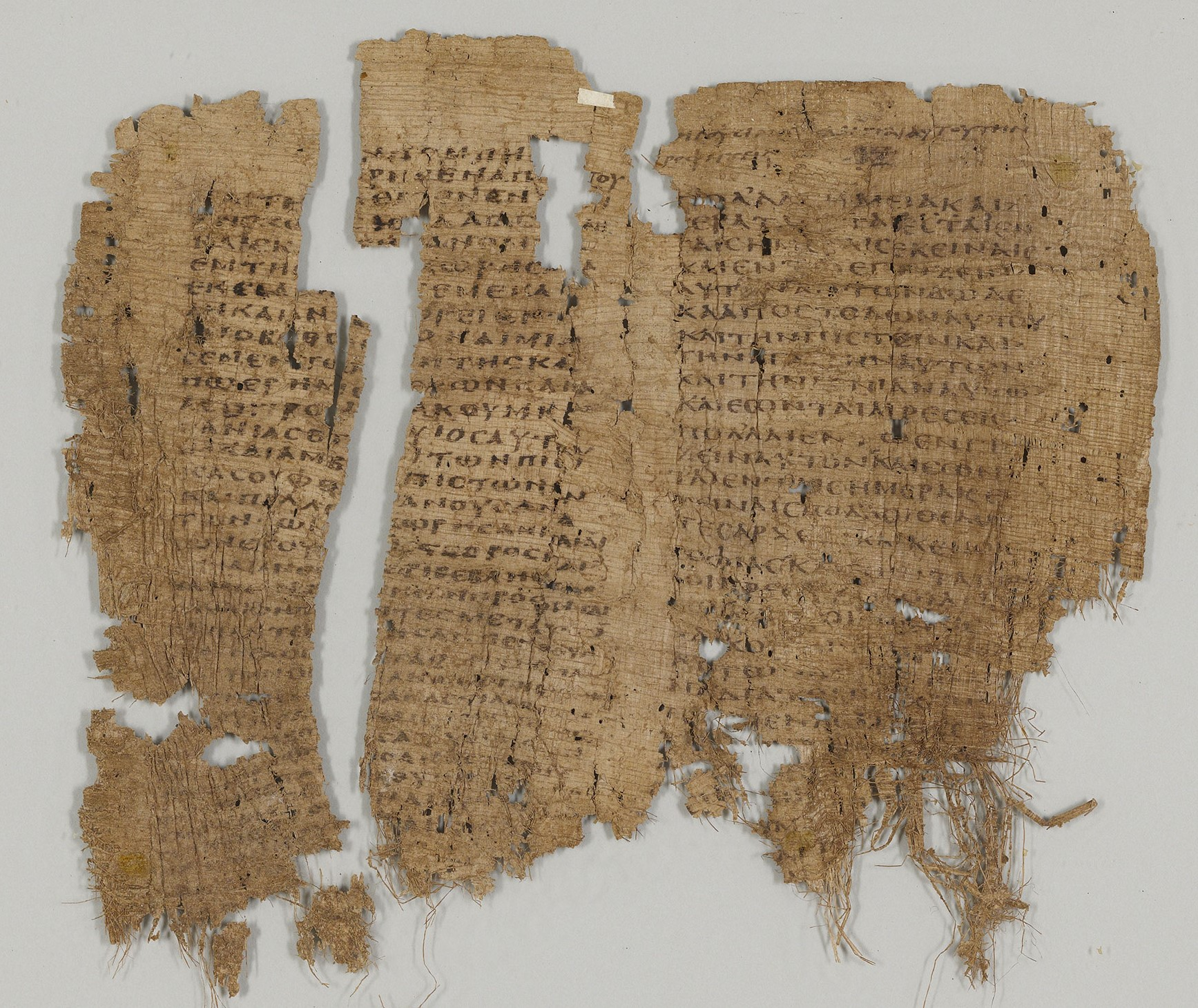
Fragmentary Greek text of the Ascension from the Amherst papyrus 1

The Ascension of Isaiah is a pseudepigraphical Judeo-Christian text. Scholarly estimates regarding the date of the Ascension of Isaiah range from 70 AD to 175 AD. Many scholars believe it to be a compilation of several texts completed by an unknown Christian scribe who claimed to be the Prophet Isaiah, while an increasing number of scholars in recent years have argued that the work is a unity by a single author that may have utilized multiple sources.

Many scholars have seen some similarities between Gnosticism and the Ascension of Isaiah.

== Dating of the text ==
It is generally believed that the text is composed of three different sections written at different times, by different authors. The earliest section, regarding chapters 3:13–4:22, was composed at about the end of the first century AD or perhaps early second century and is believed to be a text of Jewish origins which was later on redacted by Christian scribes. The date of the Vision of Isaiah (chapters 6–11) is rather more difficult to determine, but it is no more recent than the third century, since Jerome (c. 347–420 AD) cites a fragment of the work in some of his writings, but from internal evidence it seems that the text is to be placed before the end of the second century AD. The whole work was on a later date assembled as M.A. Kinibb writes:

It is not known when exactly the three sections of the Ascension were combined. The Greek fragment (from the 5th–6th cent.), the palimpsest giving the text of the fragments of the first Latin translation (likewise from the 5th–6th cent.), and the Ethiopic translation (which was made some time during the 4th-6th cent.) all presuppose the existence of the complete work. But the character of the mistakes in the Greek fragment and the Latin palimpsest suggests that the complete work had already been in existence for some time when these manuscripts were copied. It thus seems likely that the three sections of the Ascension were brought together in the third or fourth century A.D., and this is confirmed by the fact that Jerome seems to have known the complete book. It is possible that there were two stages in the process, first the combination of 3:13-4:22 with the Martyrdom, and second the combination of the enlarged Martyrdom with the Vision.

Knibb thus dates the whole text as being written between AD 150 and 200 but assembled at a later time. Most scholars agree that a mid to early second century date for the principal portion of the document is probable, dateable in its present to the least the early part of the second century.

== Content ==
=== Structure ===
Structure of the Ascension of Isaiah
1. Martyrdom of Isaiah
Scope	Chapters 1–5
Figures	Hezekiah, Manasseh, Beliar, Belkira
Theme	Isaiah warns the dying Hezekiah about Manasseh; after Manasseh takes control, Isaiah flees to the desert. Beliar inspires Belkira to falsely accuse Isaiah of treason, leading to Isaiah's execution.

2. Testament of Hezekiah
Scope	Chapters 3:13–4:22 (embedded middle)
Genre	Christian apocalypse
Figures	Jesus, Beliar
Theme	Corruption in the early Church, the rule of Beliar, and the second coming.

3. Vision of Isaiah
Scope	Chapters 6–11
Figures	Isaiah, Angelic guide, Jesus (the "Beloved").
Theme	An angel-guided journey through the Seven Heavens, detailing the descent of Jesus in disguise, and his earthly existence.

The book has three main sections:

- The first part of the book (chapters 1–5), generally referred to as the Martyrdom of Isaiah, recounts and expands on the events of 2 Kings chapter 21. Isaiah warns the dying Hezekiah that his heir, Manasseh, will not follow the same path. When Manasseh takes over, and Isaiah's warning proves true, Isaiah and a group of fellow prophets head into the desert, and a demon named Beliar inspires a false prophet named Belkira to accuse Isaiah of treason. The king consequently condemns Isaiah to death, and although Isaiah hides in a tree, he is found, and Belkira leads the execution.
  - Into the middle of this (3:13–4:22) is a Christian apocalypse called the Testament of Hezekiah, describing a vision of the coming of Jesus, the subsequent corruption of the Christian church, the rule of Beliar, and the second coming. All of this is phrased in such a way that it is clearly a code for the persecution of the Church by Nero and the belief that Nero was an Antichrist.
- The second part of the book (chapters 6–11) is referred to as the Vision of Isaiah and describes an angel-assisted journey, prior to the events of the first part of the book, by Isaiah through the Seven Heavens. It is written from a Christian perspective, concentrating on Jesus (named as the "Beloved" in the text) descending through each of the heavens disguising himself as an angel toward earth, his earthly birth, death, his resurrection, and the ascension of Jesus.

The extant complete manuscripts of the Ascension of Isaiah include a brief account of Jesus' nativity, birth, and crucifixion (11:2–22). According to Jonathan Knight, these expanded traditions are found in the Ethiopic translation (E) while the Slavonic and one of the two Latin translations (S and L2) replace them with a short summary of the earthly appearance traditions. Furthermore, he states that the common outlook among scholars is that 11:2-22 was originally in the Ascension of Isaiah and not a later insertion or adulteration.

Elements of the Ascension of Isaiah are paralleled in other Jewish and Christian writings. The method of Isaiah's death (sawn in half by Manasseh) is agreed upon by both the Babylonian Talmud and Jerusalem Talmud and is probably alluded to by the writer of the Epistle to the Hebrews (11:37). The demon Beliar appears in quite a number of apocryphal works, including the Book of Jubilees, the Book of Enoch, the Testaments of the Twelve Patriarchs, and the Sibylline Oracles. Finally, Isaiah's journey through the Seven Heavens parallels that of Enoch in the Second Book of Enoch, and the Epistula Apostolorum.

The first section of the text also contains hostility toward the Samaritans, an Israelite sect that claim to be Jews left behind during the Babylonian exile disowned by the remainder.

=== Proto-Trinitarianism ===
Some scholars have noted that the Ascension reflects a proto-Trinitarian perspective, such as when the inhabitants of the sixth heaven sing praises to "the primal Father and his Beloved Christ, and the Holy Spirit". Larry Hurtado writes;

The most extended narrative of heavenly worship is in 9.27–42, however, where a similar triadic view is presented. Having reached the seventh heaven, which is bathed in incomparable light, Isaiah sees innumerable angels and "all the righteous from the time of Adam onwards" (9.6–9). Then, after his angel guide explains how the descent of the Beloved One will make it possible for the righteous to receive their robes, crowns, and thrones (9.10–26), Isaiah sees a figure "whose glory surpassed that of all" being worshiped by Adam, Abel, and all the other righteous and angels (9.27–28). Crucially, at this point the angel guide directs Isaiah to "Worship this one," whom the angel identifies as "the Lord of all the praise which you have seen" (9.31–32), the Beloved One; Isaiah joins in the worship and sung praise directed to this figure. Then another glorious figure approaches, subsequently identified as "the angel of the Holy Spirit who has spoken in you and also in the other righteous" (9.36), and Isaiah is likewise told to join the angels in worshiping this one (9.35–36). Finally, in a carefully prepared climax to this scene, Isaiah sees "the Great Glory" (but with his spirit, for it appears that his eyes are blinded by the light of this glory, 9.37), and he relates how "my Lord" and "the angel of the Spirit" both offered worship to this third figure, along with "all the righteous" and the angels (9.40–42).

=== Theological controversy ===
The Ascension of Isaiah suggests early Christian belief in subordinationism, similar to that of Origen and, later, Novatian. The text describes the worship of the "Great Glory" by the "Beloved" and the "Angel of the Holy Spirit," implying hierarchy in the ranks of the trinity. Further, it is suggested that the angels escorting Isaiah in his ascension are none other than Jesus ("the Beloved") and the Angel of the Holy Spirit. By the text labeling Jesus and the Holy Spirit as angelic beings, a Christology and pneumatology are established that distinguish "the LORD" from "my LORD" and the Holy Spirit. This would be cause to label the story as heretical in the Western Orthodox tradition, along with similar theological beliefs, such as Arianism. Nonetheless, early Jewish-Christians, most likely in the Palestinian region, would have found this story influential in understanding theology, pneumatology and Christology, largely due to its referral to the Hebrew scriptures' prophets.

== Demons ==
Theological demons noted in the text are:

- Belial is the angel of lawlessness (Antinomianism) and is also identified as Samael and Satan.
  And Manasseh turned aside his heart to serve Belial; for the angel of lawlessness, who is the ruler of this world, is Belial, whose name is Matanbuchus.
  — (Ascension of Isaiah 2:4)
- Samael is identified in the vision that Isaiah experienced, wherein he ascended to the firmament and notes, "there I saw Sammael [sic] and his hosts, and there was great fighting therein. ...as above so on the earth [below] also; for the likeness of that which is in the firmament is here on the earth." Samael is also often identified as Malkira (Heb.: מלך רע melek ra - lit. "king of evil", "king of the wicked"; or מלאך רע malach ra - "messenger of evil", "angel of iniquity"), which are all epithets of the false prophet sent by Belial to accuse Isaiah of treason.

== Composition ==
According to the theory of R. H. Charles, the text incorporates three distinct sections, each once a separate work that is a single compilation here. Of these, one, the first, appears to have been written by a Jewish author, and the other two by Christians. However modern scholarship holds that it was all the work of Christians writers.

According to Charles, The Martyrdom consists of:

1. Ch. i. 1–2a, 6b–13a; ii. 1–iii. 12; v. 1b–14.
2. Ch. iii. 13b–iv. 18 are to be counted as a separate work, added by the first editor of the entire work, probably before the "Greek Legend" and the Latin translation were written.
3. The Vision comprises ch. vi. 1–xi. 40, ch. xi. 2–22 being thus an integral part of this section.
4. Editorial additions are: ch. i. 2b–6a, 13b; ii. 9; iii. 13a; iv. 1a, 19–22; v. 1a, 15–16; xi. 41–43.

E. Norelli suggests on the contrary that the whole text, even if written in different times, is the expression of a docetic Christian prophetic group related with the group attacked by Ignatius of Antioch in his letters to the Smyrnaeans and to the Trallians. According to this scholar chapters 6-11 (the Vision) are older than chapters 1–5 (which represent a later pessimistic introduction to the original Vision), the date of composition is the end of the 1st century AD, and the narrative of Mary's pregnancy (AI 11:2-5) is independent from the Gospel of Matthew. Other scholars reject characterizing the Ascension of Isaiah as a docetic text.

== Manuscript tradition ==
The text exists as a whole in three Ge'ez manuscripts of around the 15th-18th centuries, but fragments have also survived in Greek, Coptic, Latin, and Old Church Slavonic. All three component texts appear to have been originally in Greek, although it is possible that the "Martyrdom of Isaiah" derives from a Hebrew or Aramaic original. Comparison of the various translations suggests that two different recensions of the Greek original must have existed; one on which the Ethiopic and one of the Latin versions were based, and the other on which the Slavonic and the other Latin version were based. Fragments of both Greek versions have survived. The work's current title is derived from the title used in the Ethiopic manuscripts ('Ergata Īsāyèyās – "The Ascension of Isaiah"). In antiquity, Epiphanius also referred to it by this title (in Greek: Τὸ Αναβατικὸν Ἡσαΐου), as did Jerome (in Latin: Ascensio Isaiæ).

=== Textual sources ===
Extant content indexed to Ethiopic TOC
Greek autograph MS (G)
First recension (G_{1})		G_{2}	G_{1}		G_{2}	
Ethiopic		Amherst papyri	Greek Legend	Vat. Lib. 5750	Visio Iesaiae	Slavonic Visio Iesaiae
Eth. chapter;verse		Greek		Latin		
1;1-2;3	•					
2;4-13	•	•				
2;14-3;13	•	•		•		
3;14-4;4	•	•				
4;5-5;16	•					
6;1-16	•				•	•
6;17	•					
7;1-19	•			•	•	•
7;20-10;25	•				•	•
10;26-28	•					
10;29-11;2	•				•	•
11;3-18	•					
11;19-40	•				•	•
11;41-43	•					

- In its complete form Asc. Is. is found only in the Ethiopic Version, and even this needs to be corrected and at times supplemented by other authorities. Of this version there are five MSS, of which one is at the Bodleian, and two inferior ones in the British Museum:
  - Bodleian Library, MS Aeth. d.13 (Dillmann's Catalogue, No. 7), 15th century, fols. 95-115
  - British Library, Or. 501 (Wright's Catalogue No. 25), 15the century, fols. 62-69
  - British Library, Or. 503 (Wright's Catalogue No. 27), 18th century, fols. 57-62
  - Vatican Library, Eth. 263, 14th-15th century, fols. 85-104
  - a fragment in an Abba Garima codex (a microfilm of the codex is deposited in the Hill Monastic Manuscript Library). The fragment covers 1.4-2.3, and its text is closely similar to the manuscript of the Vatican Library.
- The Slavonic Version is extant in a MS at the Library of the Uspenschen Cathedral, Moscow. It belongs to c. AD 1200.
- There are two Latin Versions:

1. The fuller of the two was printed at Venice by Antonio De Fantis in 1522 from a MS now unknown, and republished by J.C.L. Gieseler in 1832.
2. The other version occurs in two fragments discovered by Mai in 1828 in the Codex Rescriptus of the Acts of Chalcedon, Vat. Lib. 5750, of the 5th or 6th century.

- The Greek Versions are likewise twofold:

1. The Greek text from which the Slavonic and the fuller Latin Versions were derived. Of this text 2.4–4.4 have been recovered in the Amherst papyri by Grenfell and Hunt.
2. A lost Greek text on which the Greek Legend is based. It was found at the Bibliothèque nationale de France (Note: Online per the Gallica website) by Gebhardt in a Greek MS of the 12th century This work is really a lection (Note: The term "menologium" is very widely applied to the legendary "lives of the saints" of the Orthodox Church) for Church use and so takes liberties in the way of rearranging and abbreviating the text. The Martyrdom is brought to the end and details are added. It is however very valuable for correcting and restoring the text.

From the authoritative texts, two recensions may traced to the Greek autograph MS.

1. The Greek Legend, the Latin fragments and the Ethiopic, support the first recension (G_{1}) of the Greek autograph MS (G).
2. The Greek Amherst Papyri, the Slavonic, and the fuller Latin Version follow the second recension (G_{2}).

== Sources ==
- "Apocryphal Book of the Ascension of Isaiah in Ge'ez [20th century]". Endangered Archives Programme.

Slavic

- Shakhmatov, Alekseĭ Aleksandrovich., Lavrov, Petr Alekseevich., Tschižewskij, Dmitrij. (1957). Sbornik XII veka Moskovskago uspenskago sobora: vypusk pervyĭ. Apophoreta Slavica, Vol.:1. Netherlands: Mouton, 1957. (Collection of the 12th Century from the Moscow Dormition Cathedral: First Issue).

Greek

- Grenfell, Bernard P.; Hunt, Arthur S.; Tyssen, Amherst Baron, William (1900). "The Ascension of Isaiah, and Other Theological Fragments". The Amherst Papyri: Being an Account of the Greek Papyri in the Collection of the Right Hon. Lord Amherst of Hackney, F.S.A., at Didlington Hall, Norfolk. London: Frowde. "With nine Plates."
- von Gebhardt, Oscar (1878). "Die Ascensio Isaiae als Heiligenlegende. Aus Cod. Gr. 1534 der Nationalbibliothek zu Paris". Zeitschrift für wissenschaftliche Theologie (in German). 21: 330–353.

Coptic

- Lacau, Pierre (1904). "Fragments d'apocryphes coptes". Mémoires publiés par les membres de l'Institut Français d'Archéologie Orientale du Caire (in French). 9: 1–116.
- Lefort, L. Th. (1938). "Coptica Lovaniensia". Le Muséon (in French). 51: 1–32.

Manuscript Sigla for the Sources
Language / Tradition		Charles (1900)		CCSA 7 (1995)	Manuscripts & Chapter Contents
Ethiopic		E		E	Codices Aethiopes A–L (Chapters 1–11 complete)
Slavonic		S		S	Visio Iesaiae in Old Church Slavonic manuscripts (Chapters 6–11)
Latin 1		L1		L1	Codex Vaticanus Latinus 5750 (Palimpsest, Ch. 2:14–3:13; 7:1–19)
Latin 2		L2		L2	Visio Iesaiae ed. Antonio de Fantis (1522) from lost MS (Ch. 6–11)
Greek (Papyrus)		G		G	P. Amherst 1 (Ch. 2:4–4:4)
Greek Legend	(1878)	Gk. Leg.		Leg. Gr. / Cod. Par. Gr. 1534	Codex Parisinus Graecus 1534
Coptic (Sahidic A)			(1904)	C1 / Sa A	Codex Panopolitanus / Akhmim (Ch. 3:13–20; 3:25–28)
Coptic (Sahidic B)			(1938)	C2 / Sa B	P. Copt. Lovaniensis (Ch. 4:3; 4:11–12)

== Bibliography ==
- Bauckham, Richard (2015). "Non Canonical Apocalypses and Prophetic Works §. Ascension of Isaiah". In Gregory, Andrew; Tuckett, Christopher (eds.). The Oxford Handbook of Early Christian Apocrypha. Oxford University Press. pp. 115–140 (128–130). ISBN 978-0-19-108018-0. Archived from the original on 2023-05-12.
- Knight, Jonathan (1995). The Ascension of Isaiah. Guides to Apocrypha and Pseudepigrapha. Sheffield Academic Press. ISBN 978-1-85075-543-2. Archived from the original on 2023-03-26.
- Enrico Norelli (1994), L'Ascensione di Isaia. Studi su un apocrifo al crocevia dei cristianesimi, Bologna, EDB.
- Norelli, Enrico (1995). Ascensio Isaiae: Commentarius. Corpus Christianorum Series Apocryphorum (in Italian). Vol. 8. Turnhout: Brepols.
