= Epistle of Ignatius to the Philadelphians =

Christian text

The Epistle of Ignatius to the Philadelphians (often abbreviated Ign. Phil.) is an epistle attributed to Ignatius of Antioch, a second-century bishop of Antioch, and addressed to the church in Philadelphia of Asia Minor. It was written during Ignatius' transport from Antioch to his execution in Rome.

== Composition ==
Philadelphians is one of seven epistles attributed to Ignatius that are generally accepted as authentic. In 5th century, this collection was enlarged by spurious letters.

It is clear that Philadelphians was written soon before the martyrdom of Ignatius, but it is uncertain when precisely this martyrdom occurred. Tradition places the martyrdom of Ignatius in the reign of Trajan, who was emperor of Rome from 98 to 117 AD. While many scholars accept the traditional dating of Ignatius' martyrdom under Trajan, others have argued for a somewhat later date. Richard Pervo dated Ignatius' death to 135-140 AD, and British classicist Timothy Barnes has argued for a date some time in the 140s AD.

== Content ==
Ignatius warns the Philadelphians not to start any schisms within their church, but to stay unified and obey their bishops and presbyters:

Keep yourselves from those evil plants which Jesus Christ does not tend, because they are not the planting of the Father. Not that I have found any division among you, but exceeding purity. For as many as are of God and of Jesus Christ are also with the bishop. And as many as shall, in the exercise of repentance, return into the unity of the Church, these, too, shall belong to God, that they may live according to Jesus Christ. Do not err, my brethren. If any man follows him that makes a schism in the Church, he shall not inherit the kingdom of God. If any one walks according to a strange opinion, he agrees not with the passion [of Christ].

— Ign. Phil. Chapter 3

He warns the Philadelphians not to listen to Jewish Christians who were advocating that Christians ought to observe the Torah:

But if any one preach the Jewish law unto you, listen not to him. For it is better to hearken to Christian doctrine from a man who has been circumcised, than to Judaism from one uncircumcised.

— Ign. Phil. Chapter 6

Ignatius also mentions that his home church in Antioch has recently found "peace" (cf. Ign. Poly. 7), resolving its earlier schisms, and that the Philadelphians should follow its example by electing deacons to lead their church:

Since, according to your prayers, and the compassion which you feel in Christ Jesus, it is reported to me that the Church which is at Antioch in Syria possesses peace, it will become you, as a Church of God, to elect a deacon to act as the ambassador of God [for you] to [the brethren there], that he may rejoice along with them when they are met together, and glorify the name [of God].

— Ign. Phil. Chapter 10

== Scholarship ==
Historian Paula Fredriksen presents the letter, alongside Ignatius's epistle to the Magnesians, as early evidence of the polarization of Christianity and Judaism into mutually exclusive abstractions. She notes Ignatius's insistence that living according to Judaism is incompatible with having received grace. She also points to a passage in chapter 6, in which Ignatius advises that it is better to hear about Christianity from a circumcised man than about Judaism from an uncircumcised one; she interprets this as a possible reflection of a social world in which Jewish followers of Christ and pagan God-fearers were still active simultaneously, thereby blurring the boundaries that Ignatius sought to enforce.
