= Epistle of Ignatius to the Ephesians =

Epistle dedicated to Ignatius of Antioch

The Epistle of Ignatius to the Ephesians (often abbreviated Ign. Eph.) is an epistle attributed to Ignatius of Antioch, a second-century bishop of Antioch, and addressed to the church in Ephesus of Asia Minor. It was written during Ignatius' journey from Antioch to his execution in Rome.

== Composition ==
To the Ephesians is one of seven epistles attributed to Ignatius that are generally accepted as authentic. In 5th century, this collection was enlarged by spurious letters.

It is clear that To the Ephesians was written shortly before the martyrdom of Ignatius, but it is uncertain when precisely this martyrdom occurred. Tradition places the martyrdom of Ignatius in the reign of Trajan, who was emperor of Rome from 98 to 117 AD. While many scholars accept the traditional dating of Ignatius' martyrdom under Trajan, others have argued for a somewhat later date. Richard Pervo dated Ignatius' death to 135-140 AD, and British classicist Timothy Barnes has argued for a date some time in the 140s AD.

== Content ==
Ignatius opens his letter by praising the Ephesians and highly commends Onesimus, stating: 'I received, therefore, your whole multitude in the name of God, through Onesimus, a man of inexpressible love, and your bishop in the flesh, whom I pray you by Jesus Christ to love, and that you would all seek to be like him. ... And indeed Onesimus himself greatly commends your good order in God, that ye all live according to the truth, and that no sect has any dwelling-place among you.' If the early date of the letter is accepted, this could well be the same Onesimus that Paul writes about in the canonical Epistle to Philemon. Ignatius advises the Ephesians that they should revere and obey their bishop as they would Christ himself.

For we ought to receive every one whom the Master of the house sends to be over His household, as we would do Him that sent him. It is manifest, therefore, that we should look upon the bishop even as we would upon the Lord Himself.

— Ign. Eph. Chapter 6

Ignatius seems to reiterate the topic of unity as this was one of Paul's main topic in the epistle to the Ephesians.

Ignatius references a tradition which is either not explicitly mentioned in the canonical gospel texts or is expanded on here:

Now the virginity of Mary was hidden from the prince of this world, as was also her offspring, and the death of the Lord; three mysteries of renown, which were wrought in silence by God. How, then, was He manifested to the world? A star shone forth in heaven above all the other stars, the light of which was inexpressible, while its novelty struck men with astonishment. And all the rest of the stars, with the sun and moon, formed a chorus to this star, and its light was exceedingly great above them all. And there was agitation felt as to whence this new spectacle came, so unlike to everything else [in the heavens]. Hence every kind of magic was destroyed, and every bond of wickedness disappeared; ignorance was removed, and the old kingdom abolished, God Himself being manifested in human form for the renewal of eternal life.

— Ign. Eph. Chapter 19

This story of a spectacular celestial light bears some similarities to the nativity story found in the Gospel of Matthew.

The passage "Now the virginity of Mary was hidden from the prince of this world" is cited by Origen (in a slightly altered form) in his 6th homily on Luke (c.240 AD). This is the first unequivocal reference to an Ignatian letter by another author; however, Origen gives as his source "the letter of [Ignatius]", in singular form and without specifying an addressee. By contrast, the Epistle of Polycarp to the Philippians seems to suggest that the Ignatian letters were assembled into a compilation 100 years before Origen already.
