= Epistle of Ignatius to the Trallians =

The Epistle of Ignatius to the Trallians (often abbreviated Trallians) is an epistle attributed to Ignatius, a second-century Bishop of Antioch and martyr, and addressed to the church in Tralles. It was written during the bishop's transport from Antioch to his execution in Rome.

== Composition ==
Trallians is one of seven epistles attributed to Ignatius that are generally accepted as authentic. In 5th century, this collection was enlarged by spurious letters.

It is clear that Trallians was written soon before the martyrdom of Ignatius, but it is uncertain when precisely this martyrdom occurred. Tradition places the martyrdom of Ignatius in the reign of Trajan, who was emperor of Rome from 98 to 117 AD. While many scholars accept the traditional dating of Ignatius' martyrdom under Trajan, others have argued for a somewhat later date. Richard Pervo dated Ignatius' death to 135-140 AD, and British classicist Timothy Barnes has argued for a date some time in the 140s AD.

== Content ==
The Trallian church had sent their bishop Polybius of Trallis to meet Ignatius who was being held at Smyrna on his way to execution in Rome, and Ignatius writes his letter to thank them.

In his letter he warns against false teaching, of separatism without, however, accusing them personally of these errors. He urges a duty of unity and obedience to Church leaders.

In Trallians 7:1, the phrase "God Jesus Christ" appears. This phrase is also found in Polycarp's letter to the Philippians.

Trallians mentions the resurrection of Jesus in chapter 9 (verses 1–2):

"Stop your ears, therefore, when any one speaks to you at variance with Jesus Christ, who was descended from David, and was also of Mary; who was truly born, and did eat and drink. He was truly persecuted under Pontius Pilate; He was truly crucified and died, in the sight of beings in heaven, and on earth, and under the earth. He was also truly raised from the dead, his Father having raised him up, as in the same manner his Father will raise up us who believe in him by Christ Jesus, apart from whom we do not possess the true life."
