= Catholic communion =

Catholic communion may refer to:

- Catholic Church, the individuals and groups in communion with the Holy See
- Degrees of communion with the Catholic Church
- Eucharist in the Catholic Church, also called Holy Communion

== See also ==
- Koinonia
- Catholic (term)
