= Epistle of Ignatius to the Romans =

Early 2nd century letter by the bishop of Antioch

The Epistle of Ignatius to the Romans (often abbreviated Ign. Rom.) is an epistle attributed to Ignatius of Antioch, an early second-century bishop of Antioch. It was written during his transport from Antioch to his execution in Rome. To the Romans contains Ignatius’ most detailed explanation of his views on martyrdom.

== Composition ==
To the Romans is one of seven epistles attributed to Ignatius that are generally accepted as authentic. In the 5th century, this collection was enlarged by spurious letters.

It is clear that To the Romans was written soon before the martyrdom of Ignatius, but it is uncertain when precisely this martyrdom occurred. Tradition places the martyrdom of Ignatius in the reign of Trajan, who was emperor of Rome from 98 to 117 AD. While many scholars accept the traditional dating of Ignatius' martyrdom under Trajan, others have argued for a somewhat later date. Richard Pervo dated Ignatius' death to 135-140 AD, and British classicist Timothy Barnes has argued for a date some time in the 140s AD. Although we do not know which specific year Ignatius wrote this letter, he does provide the month and day: August 23 (Ign. Rom. 10).

== Background ==
Following his arrest in Syria, Ignatius traveled through many cities on his way to Rome for execution. To the Romans was written prior to his arrival in Rome, while he was in Smyrna. Our evidence for the Ignatius’ journey to Rome primarily comes from the fourth-century church historian Eusebius of Caesarea.

While the other Ignatian epistles are addressed to communities with whom Ignatius had already had contact (either in person or via representatives), To the Romans addresses Roman Christians prior to his arrival in Rome. The epistle may have been intended to allow Roman Christians to prepare for Ignatius’ arrival, especially because it includes the specific day and month it was written.

== Content ==
The epistle follows this basic epistolary format:

- Greeting to the church in Rome (preface)
- Request that the Christians in Rome not intervene to stop his martyrdom (1.1-3.3)
- Explanation of his suffering as union with Christ (4.1-8.1)
- Closing and farewell (8.2-10.3)

Clayton Jefford provides the following short summary of the epistle:

"Greetings to the Romans! Though I am unworthy, I long to see you. Pray for me. And when I arrive in chains, let me die a martyr’s death – eaten by wild beasts! I long for this proof that I am a true disciple of Christ. Let me follow in the footsteps of the Lord. I no longer take pleasure in life. Pray for the church in Syria."

== Significance ==
While To the Romans is primarily significant for Ignatius’ discussion of his impending martyrdom, it is also important for serving as a representation of early Christian writing, though it does differ from the other six letters Ignatius wrote.

Ignatius implores the Roman Christians to allow him to be martyred, that they practice what they teach in regard to enduring suffering. The language Ignatius uses to discuss his death is frequently eucharistic, often referring to the consumption of his body as bread. Likewise, the language Ignatius uses is morbid, as the prospect of his death informs much of the letter. He claims that only through death can he attain true freedom, and that there is no longer any value in worldly things for him. Ignatius also likens his movement towards Rome to a victory march from battle. The various metaphors Ignatius uses glorify martyrdom. Overall, his rumination on martyrdom reflects the countercultural attitudes of Christianity during this post-apostolic era.

Also, it is important in how it differs from Ignatius’ other six epistles. This letter discusses martyrdom with a people Ignatius has not yet personally encountered (the Christian community in Rome), whereas the other letters primarily address issues such as church hierarchy, creeds and confessions, and maintaining Christianity. Ignatius also remarked that he could not command the Roman Christians the way Peter and Paul once did, such a comment making sense only if Peter had been a leader, if not the leader, of the church in Rome. Thus, this letter places importance upon Rome as a vehicle towards martyrdom.

Finally, this text is also important because it provides a sketch of the emerging church hierarchy. We can see how the three-tiered church hierarchy (consisting of bishops, presbyters, and deacons) was coming into being, and how regional churches were gaining unity through it.

== See also ==
- Christianity in the 1st century
- Christianity in the 2nd century
- Early centers of Christianity
- Early Christian art and architecture
- Early Christianity
- History of early Christianity

== Sources ==
- Paul Foster (ed.). The Writings of the Apostolic Fathers
- Robert M. Grant (ed.). The Apostolic Fathers: A New Translation and Commentary
- Clayton Jefford (ed.). Reading the Apostolic Fathers: An Introduction
- Wilhelm Pratscher (ed.) The Apostolic Fathers: An Introduction
- Timothy B. Sailors, "Bryn Mawr Classical Review: Review of The Apostolic Fathers: Greek Texts and English Translations".
