= Polybius of Tralles =

2nd Century Christian Bishop

Polybius was a 2nd-century Christian bishop of Tralles mentioned in the writings of Ignatius of Antioch in his Epistle to the Trallians where Polybius is described as grave in demeanour and having a gentleness which commanded respect. Polybius visited Ignatius at Smyrna while the latter was on his way to martyrdom in Rome.
