= Epistle of Ignatius to Polycarp =

The Epistle of Ignatius to Polycarp (often abbreviated Ign. Poly.) is an epistle attributed to Ignatius of Antioch, a second-century bishop of Antioch, and addressed to Polycarp, the bishop of Smyrna. Its narrative frame tells that it was written during Ignatius' transport from Antioch to his execution in Rome.

== Composition ==
To Polycarp is one of seven epistles attributed to Ignatius that some Christian scholars accept as authentic. In 5th century, this collection was enlarged by spurious letters.

Some people think that To Polycarp was written soon before the martyrdom of Ignatius, but it is uncertain when precisely this martyrdom occurred. Tradition places the martyrdom of Ignatius in the reign of Trajan, who was emperor of Rome from 98 to 117 AD. While many scholars accept the traditional dating of Ignatius' martyrdom under Trajan, others have argued for a somewhat later date. Richard Pervo dated Ignatius' death to 135–140 AD, and British classicist Timothy Barnes has argued for a date some time in the 140s AD.

== Content ==
The epistle contains various exhortations about morally correct behavior, and warnings against false doctrines (Ign. Poly. 2–5). Ignatius also rejoices at the fact that his home church of Antioch is now "at peace":

Seeing that the Church which is at Antioch in Syria is, as report has informed me, at peace, through your prayers, I also am the more encouraged, resting without anxiety in God...

— Ign. Poly. Chapter 7

Scholars such as Pearcy Neale Harrison have argued that Ignatius must be referring to some sort of schism in the Antiochene church which had recently been resolved. Ignatius then asks Polycarp to send a letter to the church in Antioch, congratulating and encouraging them for having resolved their schism:

It is fitting, O Polycarp, most blessed in God, to assemble a very solemn council, and to elect one whom you greatly love, and know to be a man of activity, who may be designated the messenger of God; and to bestow on him this honour that he may go into Syria, and glorify your ever active love to the praise of Christ.

— Ign. Poly. Chapter 7

Ignatius then requests that Polycarp send letters to various churches in Asia Minor, asking them to also send letters of congratulation to Ignatius' home church in Antioch:

Inasmuch as I have not been able to write to all the Churches, because I must suddenly sail from Troas to Neapolis, as the will [of the emperor] enjoins, [I beg that] you, as being acquainted with the purpose of God, will write to the adjacent Churches, that they also may act in like manner, such as are able to do so sending messengers, and the others transmitting letters through those persons who are sent by you, that you may be glorified by a work which shall be remembered for ever, as indeed you are worthy to be.

— Ign. Poly. Chapter 8

Polycarp seems to have responded to this request in Chapter 13 of his epistle to the Philippians, where he refers to a request of Ignatius that the Philippians send a letter to the church in Antioch.
