= Epistle =

Letter written for a didactic purpose

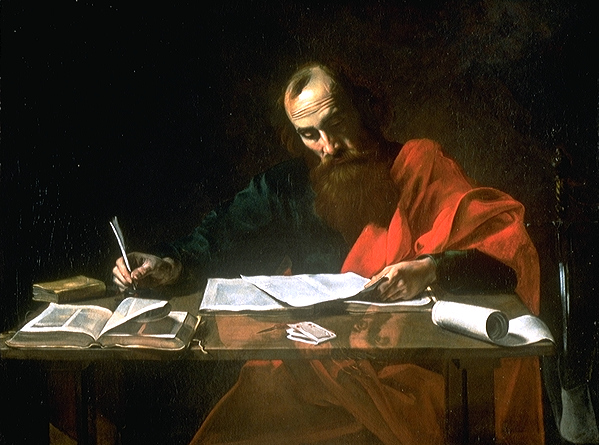
Saint Paul Writing His Epistles, by Valentin de Boulogne or Nicolas Tournier (c. 16th century, Blaffer Foundation Collection, Houston, TX).

An epistle (/ɪˈpɪsəl/; from Ancient Greek ἐπιστολή (epistolḗ) 'letter') is a writing directed or sent to a person or group of people, usually an elegant and formal didactic letter. The epistle genre of letter-writing was common in ancient Egypt as part of the scribal-school writing curriculum. The letters in the New Testament written by apostles to the early Christians are usually referred to as epistles; those traditionally attributed to Paul are known as Pauline epistles and the others as catholic (i.e., "general") epistles.

== Ancient Egyptian epistles ==
The ancient Egyptians wrote epistles, most often for pedagogical reasons. Egyptologist Edward Wente (1990) speculates that the Fifth-dynasty Pharaoh Djedkare Isesi—in his many letters sent to his viziers—was a pioneer in the epistolary genre. Its existence is firmly attested during the Sixth Dynasty of the Old Kingdom, and is prominently featured in the educational guide The Book of Kemit written during the Eleventh Dynasty. A standardized formulae for epistolary compositions existed by the time of the Middle Kingdom of Egypt. The epistolary formulae used in the Ramesside Period found its roots in the letters composed during the Amarna Period of the Twentieth Dynasty. Wente describes the "Satirical Letter" found on the Papyrus Anastasi I of the Nineteenth Dynasty as an epistle which was commonly copied as a writing exercise by Egyptian schoolchildren on ceramic ostraca (over eighty examples of which have been found so far by archaeologists). Epistle letters were also written to the dead, and, by the Ramesside Period, to the gods; the latter became even more widespread during the eras of Persian and Greek domination.

== Ancient Greece and Rome ==
Epistles in prose and verse were a major genre of literature among the Greeks and particularly the Romans. The letters of Cicero are one of the most important sources on the history of the late Roman Republic and preserve features of colloquial Latin not always in evidence in his speeches and treatises. The letters of Pliny the Younger likewise are studied as both examples of Latin prose with self-conscious literary qualities and sources for historical information. Ovid produced three collections of verse epistles, composed in elegiac couplets: the Heroides, letters written in the person of legendary women to their absent lovers; and the Tristia and Ex Ponto, written in first person during the poet's exile. The epistles of Seneca, with their moral or philosophical ruminations, influenced later patristic writers.

== Form of Christian epistles ==
Christian epistles, both those in the New Testament and among the early Christian Fathers, were written in accordance with the formalized, Hellenistic tradition. This reflects the amount of Hellenistic influence upon the epistle writers, especially in the case of Paul. Classicist Steve Reece has compared thousands of Greek, Roman, and Jewish letters contemporary with Paul and observes that Paul follows many of the normal epistolary conventions.

=== Opening/greetings ===
In contrast to modern letters, epistles usually named the author at the very beginning, followed by the recipient (for example, see Philippians 1:1). The scribe (or more correctly, the amanuensis) who wrote down the letter may be named at the end of the epistle (e.g., Romans 16:22). In the absence of a postal system, the courier may also be named (e.g. Ephesians 6:21–22).

After the names of the author and recipient, Pauline epistles often open with the greeting, "Grace and peace to you." "Grace" was a common Hellenistic greeting, while "peace" (shalom) was the common Jewish greeting; this reflected Paul's dual identity in Jewish faith and Hellenistic culture. There may also be a word of thanks to the audience. In secular letters, a prayer or wish for health followed.

=== Content/body ===
The body begins with a brief statement introducing the main topic of the entire body.

== New Testament epistles ==
The epistles of the New Testament canon are usually divided as follows:

=== Pauline epistles ===
The Pauline epistles, also called Epistles of Paul or Letters of Paul, are the thirteen books of the New Testament attributed to Paul the Apostle, although the authorship of some is in dispute. Among these epistles are some of the earliest extant Christian documents. They provide an insight into the beliefs and controversies of early Christianity. As part of the canon of the New Testament, they are foundational texts for both Christian theology and ethics. The Epistle to the Hebrews, although it does not bear his name, was traditionally considered Pauline (although Origen questioned its authorship in the 3rd century CE), but from the 16th century onwards opinion steadily moved against Pauline authorship and few scholars now ascribe it to Paul, mostly because it does not read like any of his other epistles in style and content. Most scholars agree that Paul actually wrote seven of the Pauline epistles, but many suggest that four of the epistles in Paul's name are pseudepigraphic (Ephesians, First Timothy, Second Timothy, and Titus), perhaps being written or reconstructed by Paul's followers, and that two other epistles are even less likely to have been written by Paul (Second Thessalonians and Colossians). According to some scholars, Paul wrote these letters with the help of a secretary, or amanuensis, who would have influenced their style, if not their theological content.

The Pauline epistles are usually placed between the Acts of the Apostles and the catholic epistles in modern editions. Most Greek manuscripts, however, place the catholic epistles first, and a few minuscules (175, 325, 336, and 1424) place the Pauline epistles at the end of the New Testament.

Status	Categorization	Epistle
Undisputed	Authentic Pauline epistles	First Epistle to the Thessalonians; Epistle to the Galatians; First Epistle to the Corinthians; Second Epistle to the Corinthians; Epistle to the Philippians; Epistle to Philemon; Epistle to the Romans
Disputed	Deutero-Pauline epistles; may be authentic	Epistle to the Ephesians; Epistle to the Colossians; Second Epistle to the Thessalonians
Disputed	Pastoral epistles; probably not authentic	First Epistle to Timothy; Second Epistle to Timothy; Epistle to Titus
Disputed	Anonymous sermon; nearly universally regarded as non-Pauline	Epistle to the Hebrews

=== Catholic (i.e., "general") epistles ===
The catholic epistles (also called the general epistles) are seven epistles of the New Testament. Listed in order of their appearance in the New Testament, the catholic epistles are:

Traditional epistle name	Author according to the text (NRSV)	Traditional attribution	Modern consensus	Addressee(s) according to the text (NRSV)
Epistle of James	"James, a servant of God and of the Lord Jesus Christ"	James, brother of Jesus	An unknown James	"To the twelve tribes in the Dispersion"
First Epistle of Peter	"Peter, an apostle of Jesus Christ"	Simon Peter	Maybe Simon Peter	"To the exiles of the Dispersion in Pontus, Galatia, Cappadocia, Asia and Bithynia"
Second Epistle of Peter	"Sim(e)on Peter, a servant and apostle of Jesus Christ"	Simon Peter	Not Simon Peter	To all Christians
First Epistle of John	anonymous	John, son of Zebedee	Unknown	To fellow Christians
Second Epistle of John	anonymous	John, son of Zebedee	Unknown	"To the elect lady and her children"
Third Epistle of John	anonymous	John, son of Zebedee	Unknown	"To the beloved Gaius"
Epistle of Jude	"Jude" (or "Judas"), "a servant," (Gk. slave), "of Jesus Christ and brother of James"	Jude, brother of Jesus	An unknown Jude	To all Christians

=== Epistles of Revelation ===
The Book of Revelation contains seven brief epistles directed at seven specific churches in Asia Minor: Ephesus, Smyrna, Pergamum, Thyatira, Sardis, Philadelphia, and Laodicea. According to Revelation 1, in a sudden vision Christ instructs John to write down what he is shown in a book and to send it to these seven churches with the specific cover letters.

=== Non-canonical epistles ===
- Correspondence of Paul and Seneca, a set of 14 forgeries
- Third Epistle to the Corinthians (canonical for a time in the Armenian Orthodox), also a correspondence of two letters
- Epistle to the Laodiceans (Latin version found in Codex Fuldensis)
- Letter of Peter to Philip

=== Lost epistles ===
- The first Epistle to Corinth referenced at 1 Corinthians 5:9
- The third Epistle to Corinth called Severe Letter referenced at 2 Corinthians 2:4 and 2 Corinthians 7:8–9
- The Corinthian letter to Paul referenced at 1 Corinthians 7:1
- The Earlier Epistle to the Ephesians referenced at Ephesians 3:3–4
- The Epistle to the Laodiceans referenced at Colossians 4:16
- The Earlier Epistle of Jude referenced at Jude 1:3
- The Earlier Epistle of John referenced at 3 John 1:9

== Epistles of Apostolic Fathers ==
These are letters written by some very early Christian leaders, in the 1st or 2nd century, which are not part of the New Testament. They are generally considered to form part of the basis of Christian tradition. The ennobling word "epistle" is used partly because these were all written in Greek, in a time period close to when the epistles of the New Testament were written, and thus "epistle" lends additional weight of authority.

- Epistle of the Romans to the Corinthians (1 Clement)
- Epistle of Ignatius to the Ephesians
- Epistle of Ignatius to the Magnesians
- Epistle of Ignatius to the Trallians
- Epistle of Ignatius to the Romans
- Epistle of Ignatius to the Philadelphians
- Epistle of Ignatius to the Smyrnaeans
- Epistle of Ignatius to Polycarp
- Epistle of Polycarp to the Philippians
- Epistle of Barnabas
- Epistle to Diognetus

== Liturgical use ==
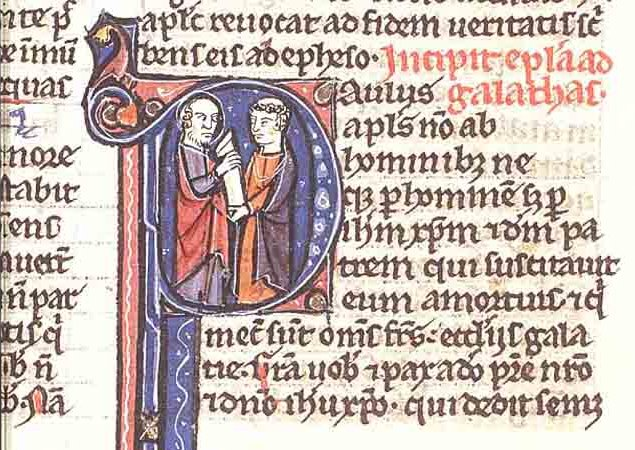
Opening of the Epistle to the Galatians, illuminated manuscript for reading during Christian liturgy.

In the context of a liturgy, epistle may refer more specifically to a particular passage from a New Testament epistle (the Pauline epistles and the General epistles)—sometimes also from the Book of Acts or the Revelation of John, but not the Four Gospels—that is scheduled to be read on a certain day or at a certain occasion.

=== Western churches ===
In the Roman Catholic Mass and Anglican Eucharist, epistles are read between the Collect and the Gospel reading. The corresponding Gregorian chants have a special tone (tonus epistolae). When the epistle is sung or chanted at Solemn Mass it is done so by the subdeacon. Epistles are also read by an Elder or Bishop in the Lutheran Divine Service, between the gradual and the Gospel.

=== Eastern churches ===
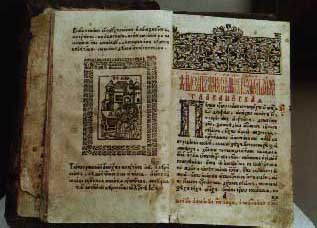
The Kniga Apostol (1632), lectionary in Church Slavonic for use in the Divine Liturgy of the Russian Orthodox Church.

In the Divine Liturgy of the Eastern Orthodox Church and the Byzantine Rite Catholics the Epistle reading is called the Apostol (the same name is given to the lectionary from which it is read). The Apostol includes the Acts of the Apostles as well as the Epistles, but never the Apocalypse (Revelation of John). Unlike in the Latin liturgical rites, there are never readings from the Old Testament. There are Epistle lessons for every day of the year, except for weekdays during Great Lent, when the Divine Liturgy is not celebrated. These daily Epistle readings are a part of the Paschal cycle, being ultimately dependent upon the date of Pascha (Easter). There are also lessons appointed for the feast days of numerous saints and commemorations. There may be one, two, or three readings from the Apostol during a single Liturgy. The Epistle is read between the Prokeimenon and the Alleluia. The Epistle reading is always linked to a reading from the Gospel, though some services, such as Matins, will have a Gospel lesson, but no Epistle (Vespers on a number of feast days (typically for Apostles) will also have three epistle readings but no Gospel). A number of services besides the Divine Liturgy will have an Epistle and Gospel reading. Such services often include a Prokeimenon and Alleluia as well. The Epistle is chanted by the reader, though at a Hierarchical Liturgy (a Divine Liturgy celebrated by a bishop), it is read by a deacon. The one who chants the Epistle also reads the verses of the Prokeimenon.

== Medieval epistles ==
During the Middle Ages, the art of letter writing was taught in numerous manuals, and the ars dictaminis became an important genre of instructional discourse. The necessity for letter writing was in large part due to the general deterioration of civil life and the decay of the Roman road system in the early Middle Ages, factors that obliged literate people with business to transact to send letters instead of travel themselves. A vast number of letters and letter-writing manuals were written in the period's lingua franca, Latin.

== See also ==
- Acts of the Apostles (genre)
- Agrapha
- Authorship of the Bible
- Epistle (Quaker)
- Epistolography
- Epistolary novel, a novel written as a series of letters or similar writings
- Epistolary poem
- Letter collection
- New Testament apocrypha
- Pseudepigraphy
- Textual criticism
- Shikshapatri
