= Robert Joly =

Belgian historian and philologist

Robert Joly (1922–2011) was a Belgian philologist, hellenist, exegete and historian of Christian sources.

== Biography ==
Joly was born in Carnières, Belgium on 12 May 1922.

He was a professor at the Free University of Brussels and at the University of Mons.

At the Free University of Brussels, he held the chair of New Testament and Greek and Latin patristics.

He edited and commented on several writings on the origins of Christianity such as The Shepherd of Hermas and published works by Hippocrates in the Budé collection.

His works on Ignatius of Antioch, who according to his research would be an imaginary character, were published from 1974 to 1980. He set out his conclusion that even the seven letters of Ignatius still considered authentic, would in fact be apocrypha written around 165 in the Christian community of Smyrna by the smyrniote forger Marcion of Smyrna.

Joly also studied a pagan religious text, The Table (or Pinax or Tabula), attributed to Cebes, a disciple of Plato.

He received the prize of the Société des Sciences, des Arts et des Lettres du Hainaut (English: Society of Sciences, Arts and Letters of Hainaut), for his critical edition of The Shepherd of Hermas in 1958, as well as the Théodore-Reinach Prize of the Association pour l'encouragement des études grecques en France (Association for the Encouragement of Greek Studies in France), for his research on the pseudo-Hippocratic treatise on the diet (Peri diaites).

He died in Anderlecht (Brussels region) on 24 July 2011.

== Publications ==
- Le thème philosophique des genres de vie dans l'Antiquité classique, Mémoires couronnés de l'Académie de Belgique, 1956.
- HERMAS, Le Pasteur, texte critique, traduction, introduction et notes, Paris, 1958 (Sources chrétiennes, n° 53).
- Recherches sur le traité pseudo-hippocratique du Régime, Liège-Paris, 1960.
- Propos pour mal pensants. Essais sur la doctrine chrétienne, Paris, 1961.
- Le Tableau de Cébès et la philosophie religieuse, 1965.
- "Le dossier d'Ignace d'Antioche. Réflexions liminaires", dans : Mélanges Armand Abel, vol. 3, Brill Archive, 1974, p. 116-125, Google Books.
- Christianisme et Philosophie. Études sur Justin et les Apologistes grecs du II siècle, Bruxelles 1973
- Le dossier d'Ignace d'Antioche, Bruxelles : Éditions de l'université de Bruxelles, 1979.
- "Le dossier d'Ignace d'Antioche. Réflexions méthodologiques", dans : Problèmes d'Histoire du Christianisme 9, Bruxelles, 1980, pp. 31-44.
- Libre pensée sans évangile, editions Labor/Espace de Libertés, coll. "Liberté j'écris ton nom", Bruxelles, 2002.
- Dieu vous interpelle ? Moi, il m'évite, editions Aden Belgique, collection EPO, 2009.
