= Catholic (term) =

Term in Christianity

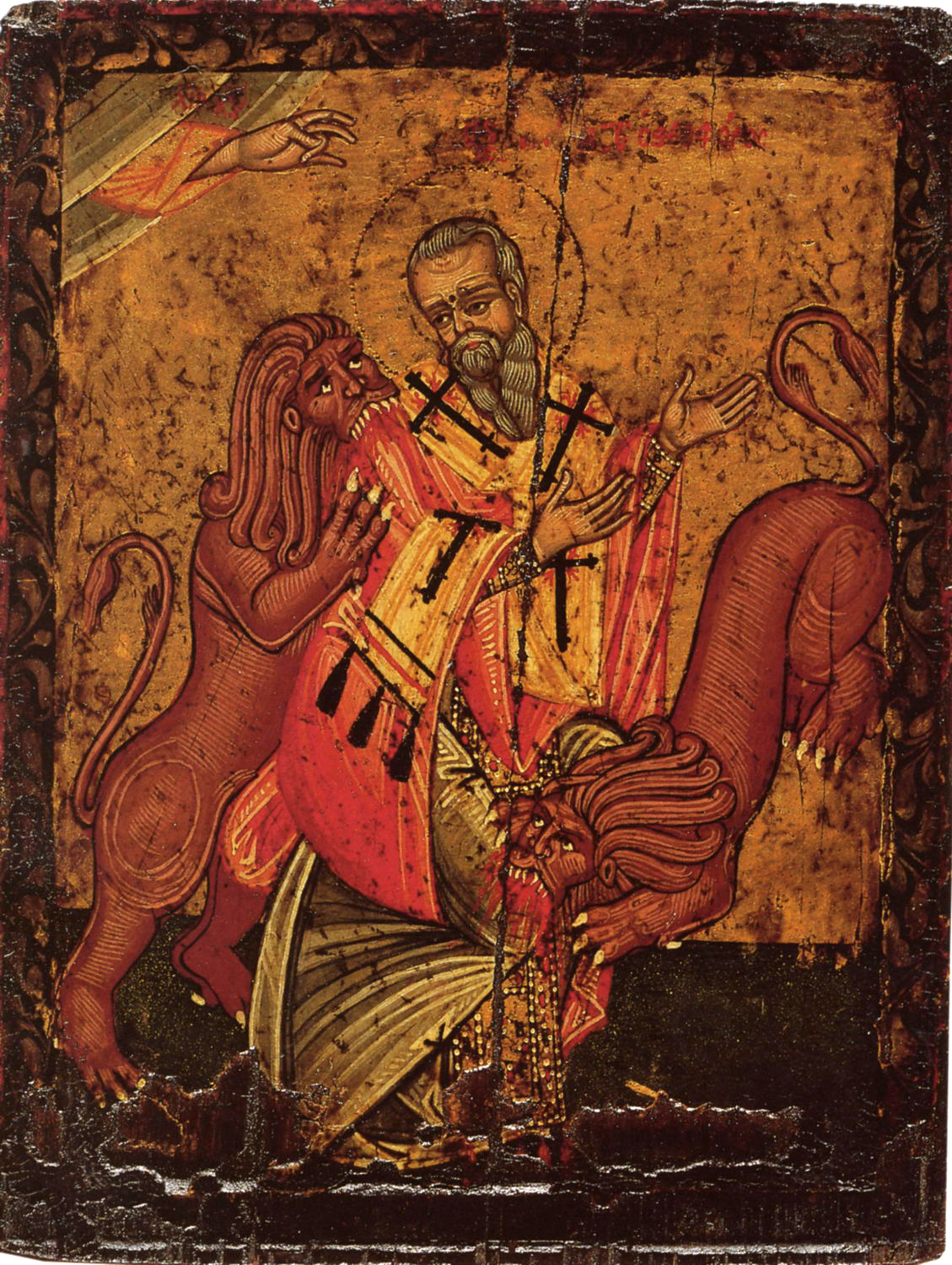
The first use of the term "Catholic Church" (literally meaning "universal church") was by the Church Father Ignatius of Antioch in his Letter to the Smyrnaeans (circa 110 AD). Ignatius of Antioch is also attributed the earliest recorded use of the term "Christianity" (Greek: Χριστιανισμός) in 100 AD He died in Rome, with his relics located in the Basilica of San Clemente al Laterano.

The word catholic (derived via Late Latin catholicus, from the ancient Greek adjective καθολικός (katholikos) 'universal') comes from the Greek phrase καθόλου (katholou) 'on the whole, according to the whole, in general', and is a combination of the Greek words κατά (kata) 'about' and ὅλος (holos) 'whole'. The first known use of "Catholic" was by the Church Father Ignatius of Antioch in his Letter to the Smyrnaeans (circa 110 AD). In the context of Christian ecclesiology, it has a rich history and several usages.

The word in English can mean either "of the Catholic faith" or "relating to the historic doctrine and practice of the Western Church". (Note: Western Christianity includes both the (Roman) Catholic Church, Protestant Churches that share historic ties with the Catholic Church, as well as independent Catholic Churches that split later.) "Catholicos", the title used for the head of some churches in Eastern Christian traditions, is derived from the same linguistic origin.

In non-ecclesiastical use, it derives its English meaning directly from its root, and is currently used to mean the following:

- including a wide variety of things, or all-embracing;
- universal or of general interest;
- having broad interests, or wide sympathies;
- inclusive, inviting.

The term has been incorporated into the name of the largest Christian communion, the Roman Catholic Church. All of the three main branches of Christianity in the East – the Eastern Orthodox Church, the Oriental Orthodox Churches and the Church of the East – had always identified themselves as Catholic in accordance with apostolic traditions and the Nicene Creed. Lutherans, Calvinists, Anglicans and Methodists also believe that their churches are "Catholic" in the sense that they too are in continuity with the original universal church founded by the Apostles. However, each church defines the scope of the "Catholic Church" differently. The Roman Catholic, Eastern Orthodox, Oriental Orthodox churches, and Church of the East, all maintain that their own denomination is identical with the original universal church, from which all other denominations broke away.

An early definition for what is "catholic" was summarized in what is known as the Vincentian Canon in the 5th century Commonitory: "what has been believed everywhere, always, and by all". Distinguishing beliefs of Catholicity, the beliefs of most Christians who call themselves "Catholic", include the episcopal polity, that bishops are considered the highest order of ministers within the Christian religion, as well as the Nicene Creed of AD 381. In particular, along with unity, sanctity, and apostolicity, catholicity is considered one of Four Marks of the Church, found in the line of the Nicene Creed: "I believe in one holy catholic and apostolic Church." Some denominations using other forms of church polity, however, still define themselves as catholic under an interpretation of apostolic succession which does not require bishops.

During the medieval and modern times, additional distinctions arose regarding the use of the terms Western Catholic and Eastern Catholic. Before the East–West Schism of 1054, those terms had just the basic geographical meanings, since only one undivided Catholicity existed, uniting the Latin-speaking Christians of West and the Greek-speaking Christians of the East. After the Schism, terminology became much more complicated, resulting in the creation of parallel and conflicting terminological systems.

== Etymology ==
The Greek adjective katholikos, the origin of the term catholic, means 'universal'. Directly from the Greek, or via Late Latin catholicus, the term catholic entered many other languages, becoming the base for the creation of various theological terms such as catholicism and catholicity (Late Latin catholicismus, catholicitas).

The term catholicism is the English form of Late Latin catholicismus, an abstract noun based on the adjective catholic. The Modern Greek equivalent καθολικισμός katholikismos is back-formed and usually refers to the Catholic Church. The terms catholic, catholicism, and catholicity are closely related to the use of the term Catholic Church. (See Catholic Church (disambiguation) for more uses.)

The earliest evidence of the use of that term is the Letter to the Smyrnaeans that Ignatius of Antioch wrote in about 107 to Christians in Smyrna. Exhorting Christians to remain closely united with their bishop, he wrote: "Wherever the bishop shall appear, there let the multitude [of the people] also be; even as, wherever Jesus Christ is, there is the Catholic Church."

From the second half of the second century, the word "catholic" began to be used to mean "orthodox" (non-heretical), "because Catholics claimed to teach the whole truth, and to represent the whole Church, while heresy arose out of the exaggeration of some one truth and was essentially partial and local". In 380, Emperor Theodosius I limited use of the term "Catholic Christian" exclusively to those who followed the same faith as Pope Damasus I of Rome and Pope Peter of Alexandria. Numerous other early writers including Cyril of Jerusalem (c. 315–386), Augustine of Hippo (354–430) further developed the use of the term "catholic" in relation to Christianity. The 5th century Vincentian Canon, published in Commonitory, defined "catholic" as "what has been believed everywhere, always, and by all."

== Historical use ==
=== Ignatius of Antioch ===
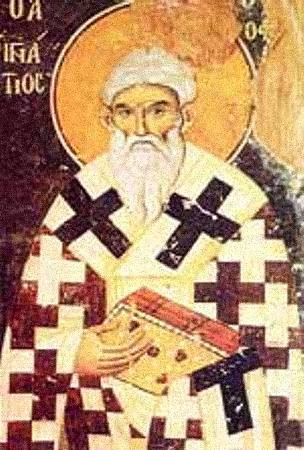
The first use of the term "Catholic Church" (literally meaning "universal church") was by the Church Father Ignatius of Antioch (c. 50–140) in his Letter to the Smyrnaeans (circa 110 AD). He died in Rome, with his relics located in the Basilica of San Clemente al Laterano.

The earliest recorded evidence of the use of the term "Catholic Church" is the Letter to the Smyrnaeans that Ignatius of Antioch wrote in about 107 AD to Christians in Smyrna. Exhorting Christians to remain closely united with their bishop, he wrote:

Wherever the bishop shall appear, there let the multitude [of the people] also be; even as, wherever Jesus Christ is, there is the Catholic Church.

Of the meaning for Ignatius of this phrase J.H. Srawley wrote:

This is the earliest occurrence in Christian literature of the phrase 'the Catholic Church' (ἡ καθολικὴ ἐκκλησία). The original sense of the word is 'universal'. Thus Justin Martyr (Dial. 82) speaks of the 'universal or general resurrection', using the words ἡ καθολικὴ ἀνάστασις. Similarly here the Church universal is contrasted with the particular Church of Smyrna. Ignatius means by the Catholic Church 'the aggregate of all the Christian congregations' (Swete, Apostles Creed, p. 76). So too the letter of the Church of Smyrna is addressed to all the congregations of the Holy Catholic Church in every place. And this primitive sense of 'universal' the word has never lost, although in the latter part of the second century it began to receive the secondary sense of 'orthodox' as opposed to 'heretical'. Thus it is used in an early Canon of Scripture, the Muratorian fragment (circa 170 A.D.), which refers to certain heretical writings as 'not received in the Catholic Church'. So too Cyril of Jerusalem, in the fourth century, says that the Church is called Catholic not only 'because it is spread throughout the world', but also 'because it teaches completely and without defect all the doctrines which ought to come to the knowledge of men'. This secondary sense arose out of the original meaning because Catholics claimed to teach the whole truth, and to represent the whole Church, while heresy arose out of the exaggeration of some one truth and was essentially partial and local.

By Catholic Church Ignatius designated the universal church. Ignatius considered that certain heretics of his time, who disavowed that Jesus was a material being who actually suffered and died, saying instead that "he only seemed to suffer" (Smyrnaeans, 2), were not really Christians.

=== Martyrdom of Polycarp ===
The term is also used in the Martyrdom of Polycarp (AD 156):

The Church of God which sojourns at Smyrna, to the Church of God sojourning in Philomelium, and to all the congregations of the Holy and Catholic Church in every place: Mercy, peace, and love from God the Father, and our Lord Jesus Christ, be multiplied.

For, [Polycarp] having through patience overcome the unjust governor, and thus acquired the crown of immortality, he now, with the apostles and all the righteous [in heaven], rejoicingly glorifies God, even the Father, and blesses our Lord Jesus Christ, the Saviour of our souls, the Governor of our bodies, and the Shepherd of the Catholic Church throughout the world.

=== Muratorian fragment ===
The Muratorian fragment (AD 177) mentions:

[Paul] wrote, besides these, one to Philemon, and one to Titus, and two to Timothy, in simple personal affection and love indeed; but yet these are hallowed in the esteem of the Catholic Church, and in the regulation of ecclesiastical discipline. There are also in circulation one to the Laodiceans, and another to the Alexandrians, forged under the name of Paul, and addressed against the heresy of Marcion; and there are also several others which cannot be received into the Catholic Church, for it is not suitable for gall to be mingled with honey.

=== Tertullian ===
The term is employed by Tertullian (AD 200):

Where was Marcion then, that shipmaster of Pontus, the zealous student of Stoicism? Where was Valentinus then, the disciple of Platonism? For it is evident that those men lived not so long ago — in the reign of Antoninus for the most part, — and that they at first were believers in the doctrine of the Catholic Church, in the church of Rome under the episcopate of the blessed Eleutherus, until on account of their ever restless curiosity, with which they even infected the brethren, they were more than once expelled.

=== Clement of Alexandria ===
Clement of Alexandria (AD 202) cites:

Therefore in substance and idea, in origin, in pre-eminence, we say that the ancient and Catholic Church is alone, collecting as it does into the unity of the one faith.

=== Cyprian of Carthage ===
Cyprian of Carthage (AD 254) wrote a large number of epistles where he makes use of the term:

Marcianus, who abides at Aries, has associated himself with Novatian, and has departed from the unity of the Catholic Church. [...] While the Bishop Cornelius was ordained in the Catholic Church by the judgment of God, and by the suffrages of the clergy and people.

When we were together in council, dearest brethren, we read your letter which you wrote to us concerning those who seem to be baptized by heretics and schismatics, (asking) whether, when they, come to the Catholic Church, which is one, they ought to be baptized.

They strive to set before and prefer the sordid and profane washing of heretics to the true and only and legitimate baptism of the Catholic Church. [...] We ought by all means to maintain the unity of the Catholic Church, and not to give way to the enemies of faith and truth in any respect. [...] Whose opinion, as being both religious and lawful and salutary, and in harmony with the Catholic faith and Church, we also have followed.

In addition to epistles 66, 69 and 70, the term is also found in the epistles 19, 40, 41, 42, 43, 44, 45, 46, 50, 51, 54, 63, 68, 71, 72, 74, 75.

=== Cyril of Jerusalem ===
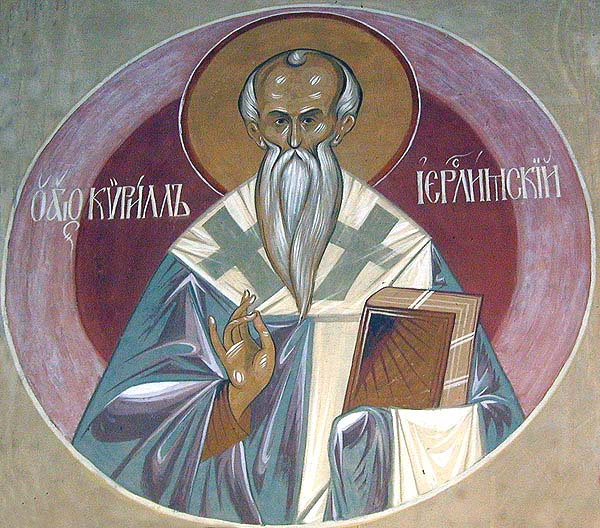
Saint Cyril of Jerusalem, fresco at an Orthodox church

As mentioned in the above quotation from J.H. Srawley, Cyril of Jerusalem (c. 315–386), who is venerated as a saint by the Roman Catholic Church, the Eastern Orthodox Church, and the Anglican Communion, distinguished what he called the "Catholic Church" from other groups who could also refer to themselves as an ἐκκλησία (assembly or church):

Since the word Ecclesia is applied to different things (as also it is written of the multitude in the theatre of the Ephesians, And when he had thus spoken, he dismissed the Assembly (Acts 19:41), and since one might properly and truly say that there is a Church of evil doers, I mean the meetings of the heretics, the Marcionists and Manichees, and the rest, for this cause the Faith has securely delivered to you now the Article, "And in one Holy Catholic Church"; that you may avoid their wretched meetings, and ever abide with the Holy Church Catholic in which you were regenerated. And if ever you are sojourning in cities, inquire not simply where the Lord's House is (for the other sects of the profane also attempt to call their own dens houses of the Lord), nor merely where the Church is, but where is the Catholic Church. For this is the peculiar name of this Holy Church, the mother of us all, which is the spouse of our Lord Jesus Christ, the Only-begotten Son of God (Catechetical Lectures, XVIII, 26).

=== Theodosius I ===
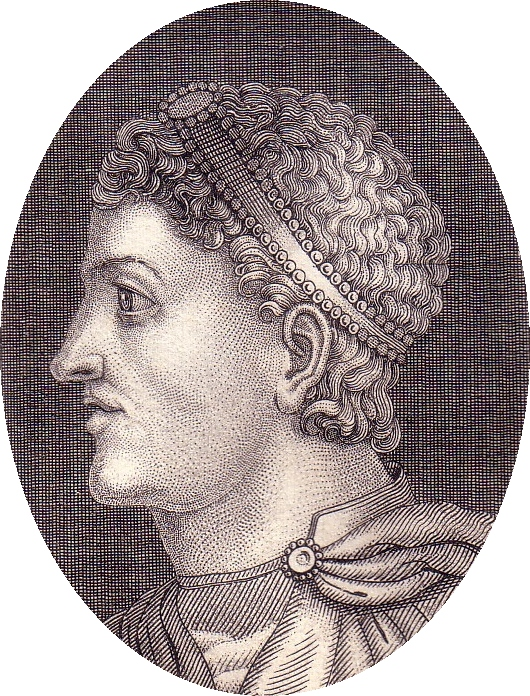
Theodosius I.

Theodosius I, Emperor from 379 to 395, declared "Catholic" Christianity the official religion of the Roman Empire, declaring in the Edict of Thessalonica of 27 February 380:

It is our desire that all the various nations which are subject to our clemency and moderation, should continue the profession of that religion which was delivered to the Romans by the divine Apostle Peter, as it has been preserved by faithful tradition and which is now professed by the Pontiff Damasus and by Peter, Bishop of Alexandria, a man of apostolic holiness. According to the apostolic teaching and the doctrine of the Gospel, let us believe in the one Deity of the Father, Son and Holy Spirit, in equal majesty and in a holy Trinity. We authorize the followers of this law to assume the title Catholic Christians; but as for the others, since in our judgment they are foolish madmen, we decree that they shall be branded with the ignominious name of heretics, and shall not presume to give their conventicles the name of churches. They will suffer in the first place the chastisement of the divine condemnation, and in the second the punishment which our authority, in accordance with the will of heaven, will decide to inflict. Theodosian Code XVI.i.2

=== Jerome ===
Jerome wrote to Augustine of Hippo in 418: "You are known throughout the world; Catholics honour and esteem you as the one who has established anew the ancient Faith"

=== Augustine of Hippo ===
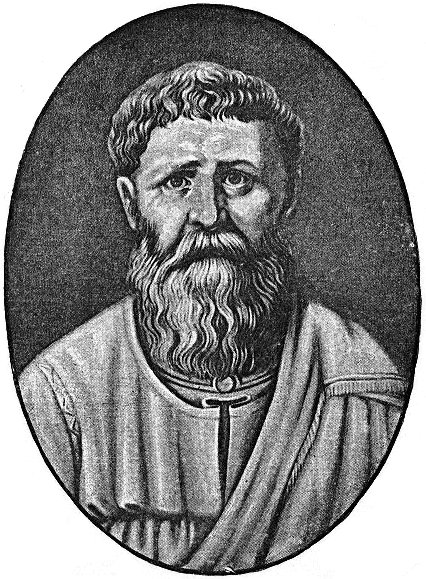
Augustine of Hippo.

Only slightly later, Augustine of Hippo (354–430) also used the term "Catholic" to distinguish the "true" church from heretical groups:

In the Catholic Church, there are many other things which most justly keep me in her bosom. The consent of peoples and nations keeps me in the Church; so does her authority, inaugurated by miracles, nourished by hope, enlarged by love, established by age. The succession of priests keeps me, beginning from the very seat of the Apostle Peter, to whom the Lord, after His resurrection, gave it in charge to feed His sheep (Jn 21:15–19), down to the present episcopate.

And so, lastly, does the very name of Catholic, which, not without reason, amid so many heresies, the Church has thus retained; so that, though all heretics wish to be called Catholics, yet when a stranger asks where the Catholic Church meets, no heretic will venture to point to his own chapel or house.

Such then in number and importance are the precious ties belonging to the Christian name which keep a believer in the Catholic Church, as it is right they should ... With you, where there is none of these things to attract or keep me... No one shall move me from the faith which binds my mind with ties so many and so strong to the Christian religion... For my part, I should not believe the gospel except as moved by the authority of the Catholic Church. —St. Augustine (354–430): Against the Epistle of Manichaeus called Fundamental, chapter 4: Proofs of the Catholic Faith.

— St. Augustine (354–430): Against the Epistle of Manichaeus called Fundamental, chapter 4: Proofs of the Catholic Faith.

=== Vincent of Lerins ===
A contemporary of Augustine, Vincent of Lerins, wrote in 434 (under the pseudonym Peregrinus) a work known as the Commonitoria ("Memoranda"). While insisting that, like the human body, church doctrine develops while truly keeping its identity (sections 54–59, chapter XXIII), he stated:

In the Catholic Church itself, all possible care must be taken, that we hold that faith which has been believed everywhere, always, by all. For that is truly and in the strictest sense 'catholic,' which, as the name itself and the reason of the thing declare, comprehends all universally. This rule we shall observe if we follow universality, antiquity, consent. We shall follow universality if we confess that one faith to be true, which the whole church throughout the world confesses; antiquity, if we in no wise depart from those interpretations which it is manifest were notoriously held by our holy ancestors and fathers; consent, in like manner, if in antiquity itself we adhere to the consentient definitions and determinations of all, or at the least of almost all priests and doctors.

— A Commonitory for the Antiquity and Universality of the Catholic Faith Against the Profane Novelties of All Heresies, section 6, end of chapter II

=== Catholic Church and Eastern Orthodox Church ===
In the early centuries of Christian history, the majority of Christians who followed doctrines represented in Nicene Creed were bound by one common and undivided Catholicity that united the Latin-speaking Christians of the west and the Greek-speaking Christians of the east. In those days, the terms "eastern Catholic" and "western Catholic" had geographical meanings, generally corresponding to existing linguistic distinctions between Greek east and Latin west. In spite of various theological and ecclesiastical disagreements between Christian sees, a common Catholicity was preserved. A great dispute arose between the 9th and 11th century. After the East–West Schism, the notion of common Catholicity was broken and each side started to develop its own terminological practice.

All major theological and ecclesiastical disputes in the Christian East or West have been commonly accompanied by attempts of arguing sides to deny each other the right to use the word "Catholic" as term of self-designation. After the acceptance of Filioque clause into the Nicene Creed by the Rome, Orthodox Christians in the East started to refer to adherents of Filioquism in the West just as "Latins" considering them no longer to be "Catholics".

The dominant view in the Eastern Orthodox Church, that all Western Christians who accepted Filioque interpolation and unorthodox Pneumatology ceased to be Catholics, was held and promoted by famous Eastern Orthodox canonist Theodore Balsamon who was patriarch of Antioch. He wrote in 1190:

For many years the once illustrious congregation of the Western Church, that is to say, the Church of Rome, has been divided in spiritual communion from the other four Patriarchates, and has separated itself by adopting customs and dogmas alien to the Catholic Church and to the Orthodox ... So no Latin should be sanctified by the hands of the priests through divine and spotless Mysteries unless he first declares that he will abstain from Latin dogmas and customs, and that he will conform to the practice of the Orthodox.

On the other side of the widening rift, Eastern Orthodox were considered by western theologians to be Schismatics. Relations between East and West were further estranged by the tragic events of the Massacre of the Latins in 1182 and Sack of Constantinople in 1204. Those bloody events were followed by several failed attempts to reach reconciliation (see: Second Council of Lyon, Council of Florence, Union of Brest, Union of Uzhhorod). During the late medieval and early modern period, terminology became much more complicated, resulting in the creation of parallel and confronting terminological systems that exist today in all of their complexity.

During the Early Modern period, a special term "Acatholic" was widely used in the West to mark all those who were considered to hold heretical theological views and irregular ecclesiastical practices. In the time of Counter-Reformation the term Acatholic was used by zealous members of the Catholic Church to designate Protestants as well as Eastern Orthodox Christians. The term was considered to be so insulting that the Council of the Serbian Orthodox Church, held in Temeswar in 1790, decided to send an official plea to emperor Leopold II, begging him to ban the use of the term "Acatholic".

=== Lutheranism ===
The Augsburg Confession found within the Book of Concord, a compendium of belief of the Lutheranism, teaches that "the faith as confessed by Luther and his followers is nothing new, but the true catholic faith, and that their churches represent the true catholic or universal church". When the Lutherans presented the Augsburg Confession to Charles V, Holy Roman Emperor in 1530, they believe to have "show[n] that each article of faith and practice was true first of all to Holy Scripture, and then also to the teaching of the church fathers and the councils".

== See also ==
- Anglo-Catholicism
- Anglican Catholic Church
- Anglican Use
- Christianity
- Liberal Catholic Church
- List of popes
