= Epistle of Ignatius to the Magnesians =

Letter by Ignatius of Antioch

The Epistle of Ignatius to the Magnesians (often abbreviated Magnesians or Ign. Mag.) is an epistle attributed to Ignatius of Antioch, a second-century bishop of Antioch, and addressed to the church in Magnesia on the Maeander. It claims to have been written during Ignatius' transport from Antioch to his execution in Rome.

== Composition ==
Magnesians is one of seven epistles attributed to Ignatius that are generally accepted as authentic. In 5th century, this collection was enlarged by spurious letters.

It is clear that Magnesians was written shortly before the martyrdom of Ignatius, but it is uncertain when precisely this martyrdom occurred. Tradition places the martyrdom of Ignatius in the reign of Trajan, who was emperor of Rome from 98 to 117 AD. While many scholars accept the traditional dating of Ignatius' martyrdom under Trajan, others have argued for a somewhat later date. Richard Pervo dated Ignatius' death to 135-140 AD, and British classicist Timothy Barnes has argued for a date some time in the 140s AD.

== Background ==
The Magnesian and Trallian churches had sent their bishops, Polybius of Trallis and Damas, in company with two presbyters from Magnesia to meet Ignatius who was being held at the nearby port of Smyrna on his way to execution in Rome, and Ignatius writes his letter to thank the Magnesian church.

== Content ==
The epistle calls for unity and submission in the church. Ignatius also cautions against "false doctrines." In particular, he warns the magnesian community about judaizing practices among Christians:

Be not deceived with strange doctrines, nor with old fables, which are unprofitable. For if we still live according to the Jewish law, we acknowledge that we have not received grace.

— Ign. Mag. Chapter 8

Ignatius' letter to the Magnesians is often cited in support of the idea that Christians should observe the Lord's Day every Sunday, rather than the Jewish Sabbath on Saturdays. The text is often translated as:

If, therefore, those who were brought up in the ancient order of things have come to the possession of a new hope, no longer observing the Sabbath, but living in the observance of the Lord's Day, on which also our life has sprung up again by Him and by His death... (emphasis added)

— Ign. Mag. Chapter 9

However, the text does not contain the word "day" [emera] but "life" or "living" [zontes] and can also be translated as "no longer Sabbatizing [observing the Sabbath in a judaizing way] but living according to Lord's way." Jesus indeed kept the Sabbath but rejected rabbinic regulations (See Mark 2:23-28 where Jesus calls himself "Lord of the Sabbath").

Even though that's the case, various other documents can be used to contradict this interpretation. For example, the Didache highlights the Lord's Day as the day that Christians ought to gather and break bread. It's also worth noting that Justin Martyr's Dialogue with Trypho, a document only about 50 years older than Ignatius' letter, in the contrary uses very specific wording when referring to the Sabbath (μήτε σάββατα ἐφύλαξαν)

For if there was no need of circumcision before Abraham, or of the observance of Sabbaths, of feasts and sacrifices, before Moses; no more need is there of them now, after that, according to the will of God, Jesus Christ the Son of God has been born without sin, of a virgin sprung from the stock of Abraham.

— Dialogue with Trypho Chapter 23
