= Ignatius of Antioch =

Patriarch of Antioch from 68 to 107

Saint Ignatius of Antioch
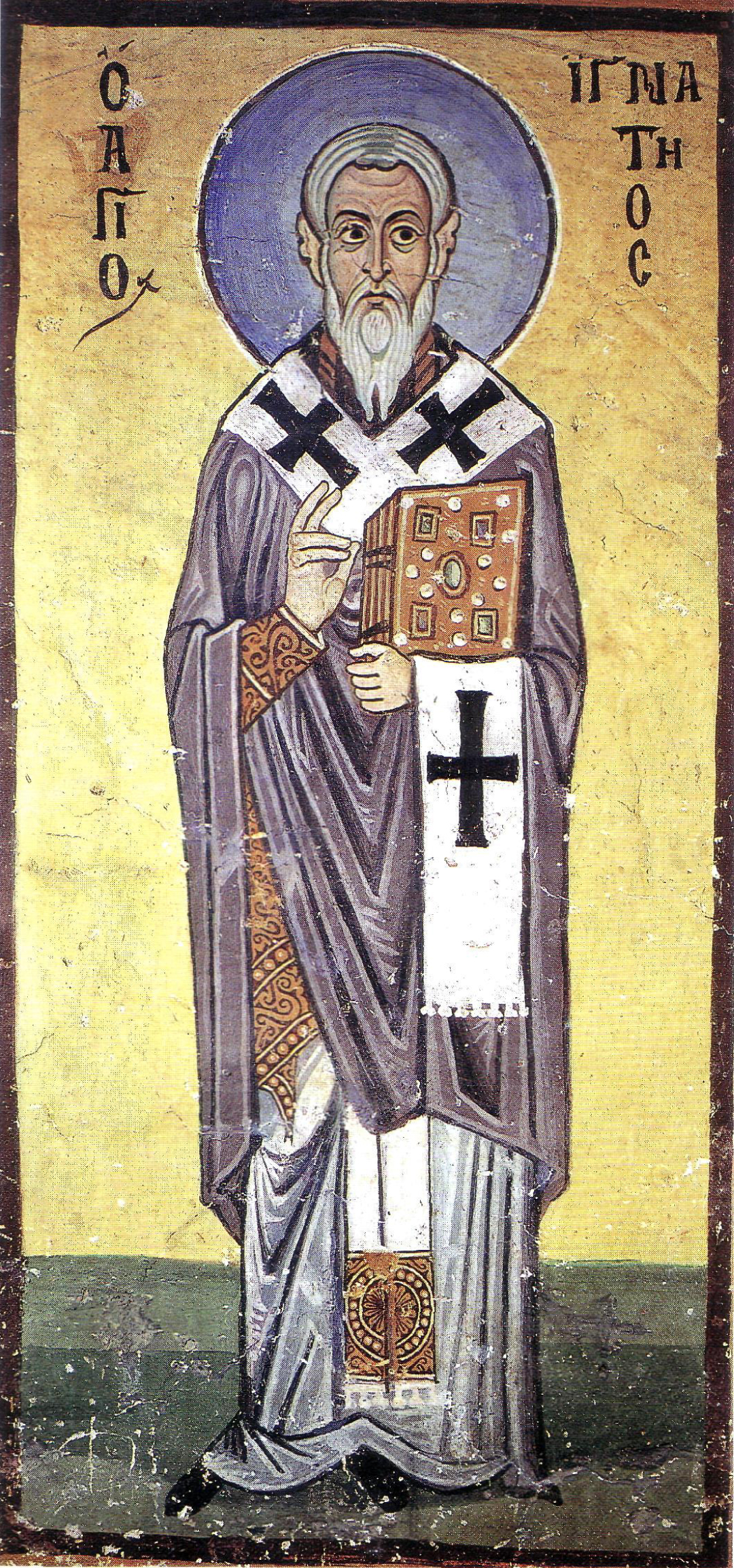
- Fresco of Saint Ignatius on the south west chapel of the Hosios Loukas monastery.

Patriarch of Antioch, Theophoros
- Born: c. 23, Province of Syria, Roman Empire
- Died: c. 108, or perhaps a few decades later Rome, Roman Empire
- Venerated in: Catholic Church; Eastern Orthodox Church; Oriental Orthodoxy; Church of the East; Anglican Communion; Lutheranism
- Canonized: Pre-congregation by John the Apostle (said in later writings)
- Major shrine: Basilica of San Clemente, Rome, Italy
- Feast: 20 December (Eastern Orthodox Church); 24 Koiak (martyrdom – Coptic Christianity); 7 Epip (commemoration - Coptic Christianity); 17 October (Catholic Church, Church of England, Lutheran Churches and Syriac Christianity); 1 February (General Roman Calendar, 12th century–1969); Monday after 4th Sunday of Advent (Armenian Apostolic Church)
- Attributes: Surrounded by lions or in chains
- Patronage: Church in eastern Mediterranean; Church in North Africa

Ignatius of Antioch (/ɪɡˈneɪʃəs/; Ancient Greek: Ἰγνάτιος Ἀντιοχείας, romanized: Ignátios Antiokheías; died c. 108), also known as Ignatius Theophorus (Ἰγνάτιος ὁ Θεοφόρος, Ignátios ho Theophóros, 'the God-bearing'), was an early Christian writer and the Patriarch of Antioch. While en route to Rome, where he was to be killed, Ignatius wrote a series of letters. This correspondence forms a central part of a later collection of works by the Apostolic Fathers. He is considered one of the three most important of these, together with Clement of Rome and Polycarp. Although the authenticity of his letters has been questioned, they continue to serve as an example of early Christian theology, and address important topics including ecclesiology, the sacraments, and the role of bishops.

== Life ==
Nothing is known of Ignatius' life apart from the words of his letters and later traditions. It is said Ignatius converted to Christianity at a young age. Tradition identifies him and his friend Polycarp as disciples of John the Apostle. Later, Ignatius was chosen to serve as Bishop of Antioch; the fourth-century Church historian Eusebius writes that Ignatius succeeded Evodius. Theodoret of Cyrrhus claimed that St. Peter himself left directions that Ignatius be appointed to this episcopal see. Ignatius was called Theophorus (God Bearer). A tradition exists that he was one of the children whom Jesus Christ took in his arms and blessed.

== Veneration ==
Ignatius' feast day was kept in his own Antioch on 17 October, the day on which he is now celebrated in the Catholic Church and generally in western Christianity, although from the 12th century until 1969 it was put at 1 February in the General Roman Calendar.

In the Eastern Orthodox Church it is observed on 20 December. The Synaxarium of the Coptic Orthodox Church of Alexandria places it on the 24th of the Coptic Month of Koiak (which is also the 24th day of the fourth month of Tahisas in the Synaxarium of the Ethiopian Orthodox Tewahedo Church), corresponding in three years out of every four to 20 December in the Julian Calendar, which currently falls on 2 January of the Gregorian Calendar.

Ignatius is honored in the Church of England and in the Episcopal Church on 17 October. Likewise, Lutheran Churches honor Ignatius on 17 October.

== Martyrdom ==
=== Circumstances of martyrdom ===
Ignatius was condemned to death for his faith, but instead of being executed in his home town of Antioch, the bishop was taken to Rome by a company of ten soldiers:

'From Syria even unto Rome I fight with beasts, both by land and sea, both by night and day, being bound to ten leopards, I mean a band of soldiers...'

— Ignatius to the Romans Chapter 5

Scholars consider Ignatius' transport to Rome unusual since those persecuted as Christians would be expected to be punished locally. Stevan Davies has pointed out that "no other examples exist from the Flavian age of any prisoners except citizens or prisoners of war being brought to Rome for execution".

If Ignatius had been a Roman citizen, he could have appealed to the emperor, with the common result of execution by beheading rather than torture. However, Ignatius' letters state that he was put in chains during the journey, but it was against Roman law for a citizen to be put in bonds during an appeal to the emperor.

Allen Brent suggests that Ignatius was transferred to Rome for the emperor to provide a spectacle as a victim in the Colosseum. Brent also asserts, contrary to some, that "it was normal practice to transport condemned criminals from the provinces in order to offer spectator sport in the Colosseum at Rome."

Stevan Davies rejects this idea, reasoning that: "If Ignatius was in some way a donation by the Imperial Governor of Syria to the games at Rome, a single prisoner seems a rather miserly gift." Instead, Davies proposes that Ignatius may have been indicted by a legate, or representative, of the governor of Syria while the governor was away temporarily, and sent to Rome for trial and execution. Under Roman law, only the governor of a province or the emperor himself could impose capital punishment, so the legate would have faced the choice of imprisoning Ignatius in Antioch or sending him to Rome. Transporting the bishop might have avoided further agitation by the Antiochian Christians.

Christine Trevett calls Davies' suggestion "entirely hypothetical" and concludes that no fully satisfactory solution to the problem can be found: "I tend to take the bishop at his word when he says he is a condemned man. But the question remains, why is he going to Rome? The truth is that we do not know."

=== Route of travel to Rome ===
During the journey to Rome, Ignatius and his entourage of soldiers made a number of lengthy stops in Asia Minor, deviating from the most direct land route from Antioch to Rome. Ignatius' route of travel has been reconstructed as follows:

1. Ignatius first was taken from Antioch, in the province of Syria, to Asia Minor. It is uncertain whether this happened by sea or by land;
2. He was then taken to Smyrna, via a route that bypassed the cities of Magnesia, Tralles, and Ephesus, but likely passed through Philadelphia; (cf. Ign. Phil. 7)
3. Ignatius then was brought to Troas, where he boarded a ship bound for Neapolis in Macedonia; (cf. Ign. Pol. 8)
4. He then passed through the city of Philippi; (cf. Pol. Phil. 9)
5. After this, he was taken by some land or sea route to Rome.

During the journey, the soldiers seem to have allowed the chained Ignatius to meet with entire congregations of Christians, at least at Philadelphia (cf. Ign. Phil. 7), and numerous Christian visitors and messengers were allowed to meet with him individually. Via these messengers, Ignatius sent six letters to nearby churches, and one to Polycarp, the bishop of Smyrna.

These aspects of Ignatius' martyrdom are also unusual, in that a prisoner would normally be transported on the most direct route to his destination. Travel by land in the Roman Empire was far more expensive than by sea, especially since Antioch was a major sea port. Davies argues that Ignatius' circuitous route can only be explained by positing that he was not the main purpose of the soldiers' trip and that the various stops in Asia Minor were for other state business. He suggests that such a scenario would also explain the relative freedom that Ignatius was given to meet with other Christians during the journey.

=== Date of martyrdom ===
Tradition places Ignatius's martyrdom in the reign of Trajan (c. 98–117). The earliest source for this is the 4th-century church historian Eusebius of Caesarea. Richard Pervo argues that Eusebius may have had an ideological interest in dating church leaders as early as possible, and asserting a continuous succession between the original apostles of Jesus and the leaders of the church in his day. However, Jonathon Lookadoo argues that John Malalas and the Acts of Martyrdom's accounts of Ignatius are independent from Eusebius and they still place his death under Trajan.

While many scholars accept this traditional dating, others have argued for a somewhat later date. Richard Pervo dated Ignatius' death to 135–140. British classicist Timothy Barnes has argued for a date in the 140s, on the grounds that Ignatius seems to have quoted a work of Ptolemy the Gnostic, who became active only in the 130s. Étienne Decrept has argued from the testimony of John Malalas and the Acts of Drosis that Ignatius was martyred under the reign of Trajan during Apollo's festival in July 116, and in response to the earthquake at Antioch in late 115.

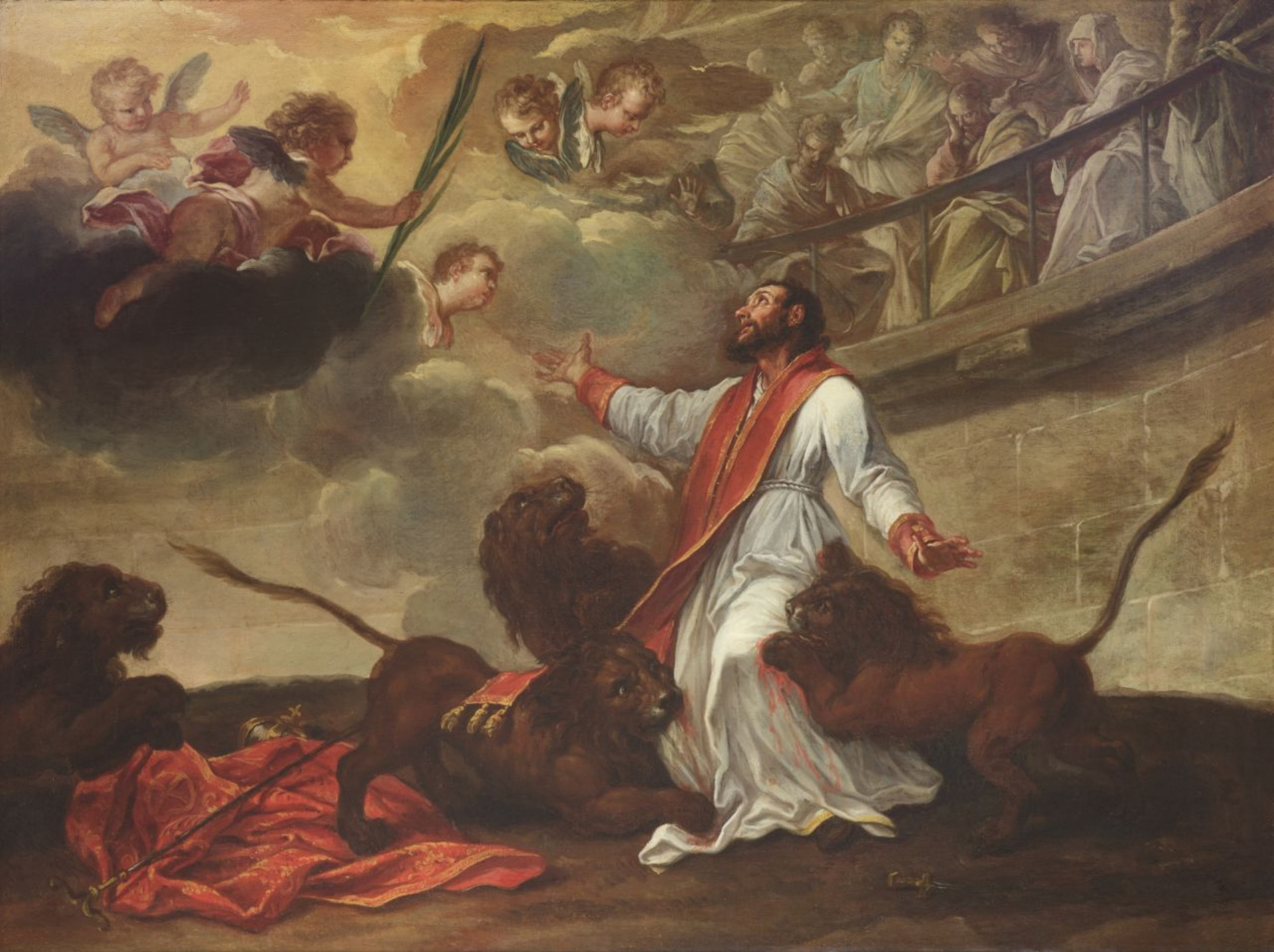
Martyrdom of St. Ignatius of Antioch by Pier Leone Ghezzi

=== Death and aftermath ===
Ignatius wrote that he would be thrown to the beasts; in the fourth century, Eusebius reports a tradition that this did happen, while Jerome is the first to explicitly mention lions. John Chrysostom is the first to place Ignatius' martyrdom at the Colosseum. Modern scholars are uncertain whether any of these authors had sources other than Ignatius' own writings.

According to a medieval Christian text titled Martyrium Ignatii, Ignatius' remains were carried back to Antioch by his companions after his martyrdom. The sixth-century writings of Evagrius Scholasticus state that the reputed remains of Ignatius were moved by the Emperor Theodosius II to the Tychaeum, or Temple of Tyche, and converted it into a church dedicated to Ignatius. In 637, when Antioch was captured by the Rashidun Caliphate, the relics were transferred to the Basilica di San Clemente in Rome.

=== The Martyrium Ignatii ===
The Martyrium Ignatii is an account of the saint's martyrdom. It is presented as an eye-witness account for the church of Antioch, attributed to Ignatius' companions, Philō of Cilicia, deacon at Tarsus, and Rheus Agathopus, a Syrian.

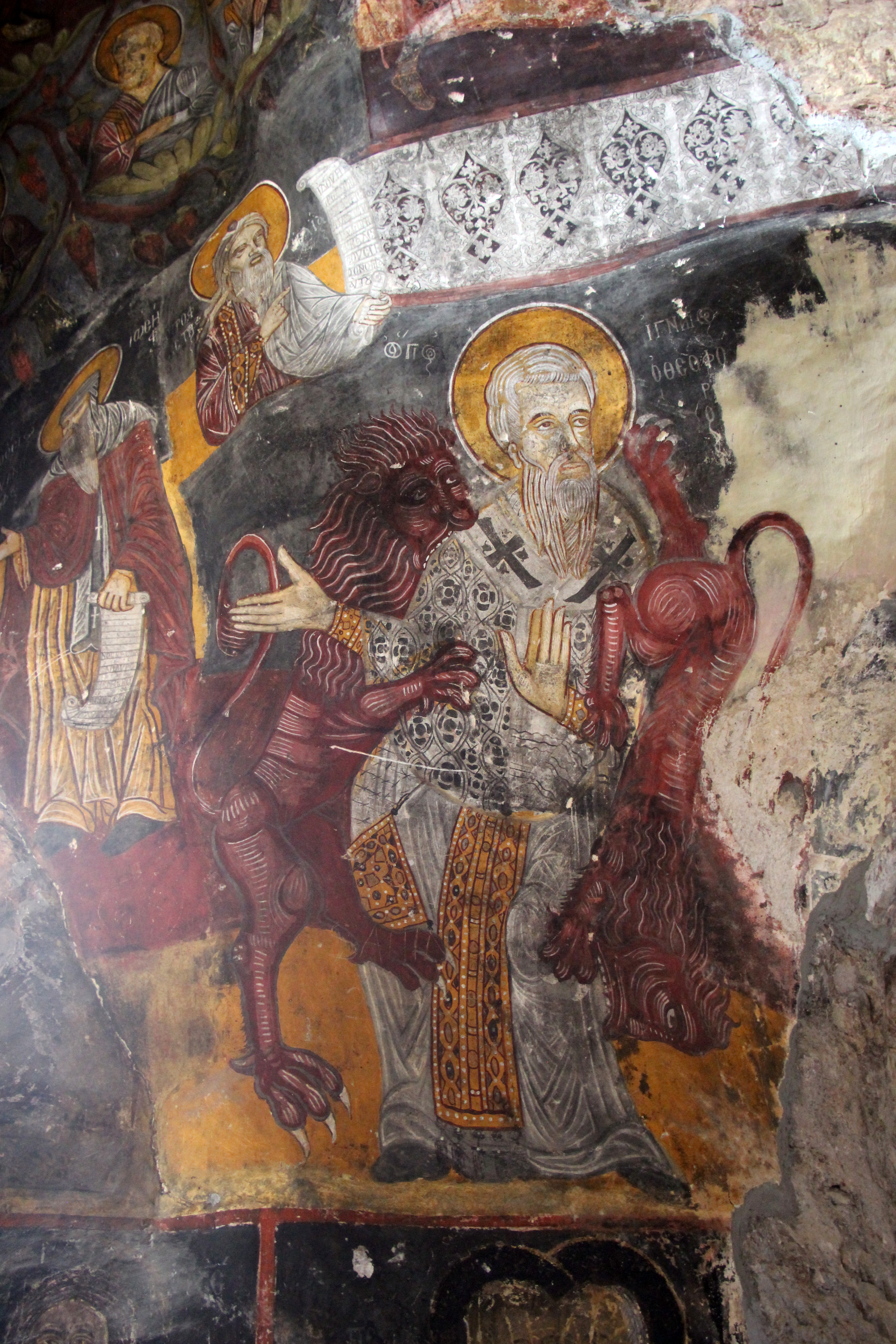
Fresco of Saint Ignatios from the Soumela Monastery in Trebizond.

Its most reliable manuscript is the 10th-century collection Codex Colbertinus (Paris), in which it is the final item. The Martyrium presents the confrontation of Bishop Ignatius with Emperor Trajan at Antioch, a familiar trope of Acta of the martyrs, and many details of the long journey to Rome. The Synaxarium of the Coptic Orthodox Church of Alexandria says that he was thrown to the wild beasts that devoured him.

== Epistles ==
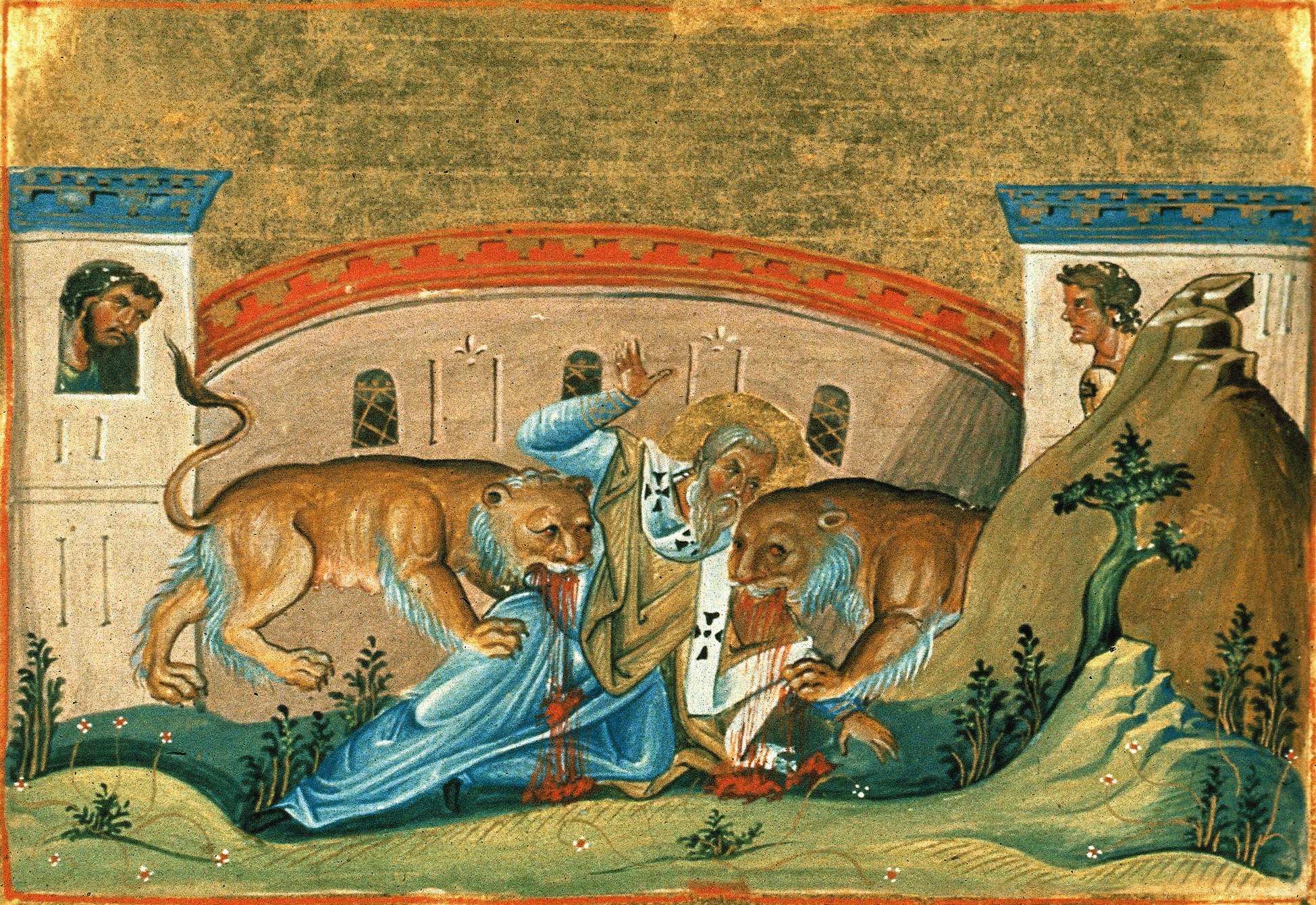
An icon of Ignatius of Antioch from the Menologion of Basil II (c. 1000)

The following seven epistles preserved under the name of Ignatius are generally considered authentic since they were mentioned by the historian Eusebius in the first half of the fourth century.

Seven original epistles:

- The Epistle to the Ephesians;
- The Epistle to the Magnesians;
- The Epistle to the Trallians;
- The Epistle to the Romans;
- The Epistle to the Philadelphians;
- The Epistle to the Smyrnaeans;
- The Epistle to Polycarp, a bishop of Smyrna.

=== Style and structure ===
Ignatius's letters bear signs of being written in great haste, such as run-on sentences and an unsystematic succession of thought. Ignatius modelled them after the biblical epistles of Paul, Peter, and John, quoting or paraphrasing these apostles' works freely. For example, in his letter to the Ephesians he quoted 1 Corinthians 1:18:

Let my spirit be counted as nothing for the sake of the cross, which is a stumbling-block to those that do not believe, but to us salvation and life eternal.

— Letter to the Ephesians 18, Roberts and Donaldson translation

=== Recensions ===
The text of these epistles is known in three different recensions (versions): the Short Recension, found in three pre-AD 900 Syriac manuscripts; the Middle Recension, attested as of 2024 by about three dozen manuscripts, manuscript fragments and manuscript compilations in Greek, Latin, Armenian, Slavonic, Coptic, Arabic, Ethiopic and Syriac, usually containing at least the Epistle to the Romans, often 3-16 others, and the Long Recension, found in numerous Late Medieval manuscripts in Greek, Latin and Georgian which typically contain expanded collections of around 13 letters. The original letters were written in Ancient Greek with some Latinisms, but the Middle Recension manuscripts in other languages seem to be based on more than one Greek source, as some variant readings found in them seem too divergent to be merely caused by the ambiguities of translation. In this regard, it was also noted that the Middle Recension's Epistle to the Romans was apparently transmitted on two different routes – together with the Martyrium Ignatii but none of the other epistles, as well as part of a collection of Ignatian epistles and occasionally also the Martyrium Ignatii (in which case, the Epistle to the Romans is placed after the Martyrium). Unfortunately, the famous Laurentian Library manuscript (the main source for reconstructing the Middle Recension text) has lost one or more leaves at the end; it does not contain the Epistle to the Romans in its present state, but other Ignatian letter collections of comparable age generally feature this epistle as the very last; thus, it is quite likely that the Laurentian manuscript also ended with the Epistle to the Romans before it got damaged.

For some time, it was believed that the Long Recension was the only extant version of the Ignatian epistles, but around 1628 a Latin translation of the Middle Recension was discovered by Archbishop James Ussher, who published it in 1646. For around a quarter of a century after this, it was debated which recension represented the original text of the epistles. But John Pearson's strong defense of the authenticity of the Middle Recension in the late 17th century established a scholarly consensus that the Middle Recension is the original version of the text. The Long Recension is the product of a fourth-century Arian Christian, who interpolated the Middle Recension epistles in order posthumously to enlist Ignatius as an unwitting witness in theological disputes of that age. This individual also forged the six spurious epistles attributed to Ignatius (see § Pseudo-Ignatius below).

The manuscripts representing the Short Recension of the Ignatian epistles were discovered and published by William Cureton in the mid-19th century. For a brief period, there was a scholarly debate on the question of whether the Short Recension was earlier and more original than the Middle Recension. But by the end of the 19th century, Theodor Zahn and J. B. Lightfoot had established a scholarly consensus that it is easier to arrive at the Short Recension text by summarizing the Middle Recension, than expanding the Short Recension to gain the Middle Recension text; thus, the Short Recension post-dates the Middle Recension. This consensus has been questioned again in the early 21st century by such experts as Markus Vinzent, but so far not very successfully. Other recent studies have claimed that the Short Recension parallels the long Recension in intent but is opposite in method: instead of adding, it seems to selectively excise material relevant to post-3rd century questions of dogma within mainstream ("Orthodox"="Catholic", at that time) Christianity. While this results in a more theologically neutral text – also observed by Vinzent, but interpreted as indication of the Short Recension being older –, the Short Recension's missing passages often interrupt the flow of the stylistically elaborate arguments and exhortations which are characteristic for the Ignatian corpus (and even were imitated – with varying success – in the Long Recension and the now-rejected letters): the Short Recension appears not only as theologically less developed, but also as stylistically less "typically Ignatian".

=== Authenticity ===
The earliest known texts of six of the seven letters are found in the Codex Mediceo Laurentianus, written in Greek in the 11th century (which also contains the pseudepigraphical letters of the Long Recension, except that to the Philippians), while the letter to the Romans is found in the Codex Colbertinus.

Though the Catholic Church has always supported the authenticity of at least seven letters, some Protestants have tended to deny the authenticity of all the epistles because they seem to attest to a monarchical episcopate in the second century. John Calvin called the epistles "rubbish published under Ignatius' name".

In 1886, Presbyterian minister and church historian William Dool Killen published a long essay attacking the authenticity of the epistles attributed to Ignatius. He argued that Pope Callixtus I, bishop of Rome, forged the letters around AD 220 to garner support for a monarchical episcopate, modeling Saint Ignatius after his own life to give precedent for his own authority. Killen contrasted this episcopal polity with the presbyterian polity in the writings of Polycarp.

Doubts about the letters' authenticity continued throughout the 20th century and beyond. In the 1970s and 1980s, the scholars Robert Joly, Reinhard Hübner, Markus Vinzent, and Thomas Lechner argued forcefully that the epistles of the Middle Recension were forgeries from the reign of Marcus Aurelius (161–180). Joseph Ruis-Camps published a study arguing that the Middle Recension letters were pseudepigraphically composed based on an original, smaller, authentic corpus of four letters (Romans, Magnesians, Trallians, and Ephesians). In 2009, Otto Zwierlein support the thesis of a forgery written around 170 AD.

These publications stirred up heated scholarly controversy, but by 2017, most patristic scholars accepted the authenticity of the seven original epistles. However, starting with a collection of studies published in 2018, the view that all the letters are a pseudepigraphy most likely composed by a Roman pro-monepiscopate faction in 160–180 is again proposed by "a significant number of Ignatian researchers". As of 2020, most of these were from Germany, with UK/US authors generally accepting the seven Middle Recension letters as genuine. In notable contrast to previous research, 21st-century Ignatian studies – regardless of their conclusions – usually treat the questions of dating and authenticity as independent of each other and requiring separate proofs or refutations. A very early (pre-110) or extremely late (post-180) date is widely (but not universally) dismissed nowadays; as of 2020 most authors either propose the letters to be authentic and date from the mid-late 110s, or date them to almost 150 (with either view as regards authenticity), or consider them pseudepigraphic – and possibly a deliberate novel-like hagiographic fiction, closely tied in some way to Lucian's Peregrinus Proteus, and unrelated except in name to the Ignatius mentioned by Polycarp – dating from post-160.

Confounding the questions of how and when the Ignatiana were assembled, and which letters and what text-type are genuine (or at least the most ancient), are the facts that a full critical edition has not been published since Lightfoot, and that as of 2024 no stemmatic analysis has been conducted. Also, the term "recension" – first applied to the Ignatiana in the early Modern era, when the manuscript evidence was still fairly straightforward – is far more ambiguous today and liable to lead to confusion between the different collections and the different text-types evidenced in the known Ignatiana manuscripts, even in some professional and scholarly sources. Unfortunately, this most severely affects the "7-letter middle-recension" version which today is the only one not rejected by a large majority of experts. For example, the reconstruction of the "middle recension" text was largely based on letters from "long" collections, and was usually called "shorter recension" before Cureton published the even shorter text-type from the Syriac manuscripts.

=== Reception in Antiquity ===
Resolving the questions of dating and authenticity is made difficult by the comparative lack of reception of the Ignatian letters in proto-orthodox writings. The Epistle of Polycarp to the Philippians (Pol.Phil.) seems to imply that the Ignatian letters were collated into a collection before AD 150 already, but the pertinent passages are considered suspect by most authors today. Irenaeus, who was said to be familiar with Ignatius' close acquaintance Polycarp, in his Against Heresies V,28:4 (Lugdunum, c.180 AD) cites a passage found in the Epistle of Ignatius to the Romans (Ign.Rom.) almost verbatim, but claims it was "said" by "someone of our[ people]" (quidam de nostris dixit), contrasting with his usual tendency to reference his authorities by name. Moreover, Irenaeus also attests elsewhere that he is quite familiar with Pol.Phil., in which a martyr named Ignatius is discussed, and it is striking that he attributes his Ign.Rom. citation to an anonymous "someone" instead of referring it to the martyr he knew from Polycarp's letter.

In the 3rd century AD, Origen gives an abbreviated quotation from the Epistle of Ignatius to the Ephesians in his 6th homily on Luke (Caesarea c. 240 AD), and at about the same time in his Commentary on the Song of Songs (prologue, chapter 2) gives a brief quote from Ignatius' Roman epistle as something which Ignatius "said" and Origen "remembered". Also, and probably in the 220s AD already, Origen cites the heterodox phrase "I am not an incorporeal daemon" which prominently occurs in the Epistle of Ignatius to the Smyrnaeans (Ign.Sm.), but instead of attributing it to this letter, he gives a "booklet which is called Doctrines of Peter" (probably the pseudepigraphic Kerygma Petri) as his source. He quite insistently and at some length expounds that the concept of incorporeality is alien to Christian thought as he understood it ("the appellation 'ασώματου' is [...] indeed also not used in our Scriptures and unknown [to mainstream Christian authors]."), suggesting that he was not trying to dissociate the Ignatian use of the phrase from the heterodox if not heretical Kerygma Petri, but instead did not know Ign.Sm. at all: the letter implicitly attributes this phrase to a heterodox (pseudo)Petrine source, which immediately collapses Origen's entire argument.

Eusebius is the first author to provide unequivocal testimony to more than 3 Ignatian letters, proving they were known in southern Syria Palaestina by about 300 AD. However, while Eusebius lists only those 7 letters which today are considered genuine by many, the early Ignatiana manuscripts neither contain all of these 7 letters and no others, nor are they arranged in the sequence given by Eusebius: typically, Ign.Rom. is missing, the other 6 letters are arranged in various different sequences, and at least one of the pseudo-Ignatian letters is added.

Even as late as around 400 AD, John Chrysostom – an Antiochene who knew of Ignatius supposed relics located there – in his homily on Ignatius neither gives any corroborating details of his venerated compatriot's life, nor references the letters; compare, for example, his first homily on Priscilla and Aquila which quotes the primary sources verbatim. Neither do pre-Eusebius authors in the doctrinal disputes, which started in the mid-late 2nd and became highly divisive in the 3rd to 5th centuries AD, refer to or quote the Ignatian letters, even when doing so would have given a decisive authority to the argument. And as Markus Vinzent – one of the few present-day experts who advocates an original collection of only 3 letters and does not dismiss the "short recension" as an abbreviation of the "middle recension" – has noted, all presently known early quotations from the Ignatian corpus are from passages which are identical (if the uncertainties of translation are accounted for) in the 3- and 7-letter collections, as well as in the short- and middle-recension text-types. The first unequivocal attestations for the existence of the 7 letters listed by Eusebius and the middle-recension text, on the other hand, considerably post-date Eusebius, and are roughly contemporary with the first witnesses to the long-recension text and the pseudepigraphically expanded collections.

In summary, during the initial ~150 years during which a compilation of all Ignatian letters was supposedly available, at least two letters are attested to exist in written form by presently-known sources, one of which (Ephesians) was used as a source, while two passages from another (Romans) are independently cited as having been "said" – once by Ignatius, and once by an unspecified "someone". But even Origen, who speaks of Ignatius' "letters" in plural, does not indicate if he knew of more than the two letters he cited from, and his choice of words seems to suggest that at the time of his writing, he had at most one letter at hand. This widespread absence of Ignatian references in authors that could be expected to quote or at least paraphrase Ignatius' letters, and attribute them by name, is in striking contrast to the same authors' use of Polycarp or Clement of Rome, and to the subsequent popularity of the Ignatian letters. This discrepancy was already noted by the 19th-century authors mentioned above. The 7-letter-middle-recension hypothesis is thus, more than 300 years after John Pearson, still only based on the testimony of Eusebius, has no material support yet, and the pre-Eusebian references cannot distinguish between a 3-letter and a 7-letter hypothesis (and can even be interpreted as favoring the former); meanwhile, the short recension has even less evidence in its favor, at least if the Lectio brevior rule-of-thumb is held not to apply in this case. The expanded collections and the long recension, on the other hand, are today universally and robustly rejected by experts as post-AD 300 pseudepigraphies/forgeries. The earliest known source, as of 2022, which contains only the 7 letters listed by Eusebius – albeit in a very different sequence – and uses the middle-recension text, is a 13th-century Arabic manuscript (Sin. ar. 505).

== Theology ==
=== Christology ===
Ignatius is known to have taught the deity of Christ:

There is one Physician who is possessed both of flesh and spirit; both made and not made; God existing in flesh; true life in death; both of Mary and of God; first passible and then impassible, even Jesus Christ our Lord.

— Letter to the Ephesians, ch. 7, shorter version, Roberts-Donaldson translation

The same section in text of the Long Recension says the following:

But our Physician is the Only true God, the unbegotten and unapproachable, the Lord of all, the Father and Begetter of the only-begotten Son. We have also as a Physician the Lord our God, Jesus the Christ, the only-begotten Son and Word, before time began, but who afterwards became also man, of Mary the virgin. For "the Word was made flesh". Being incorporeal, He was in the body, being impassible, He was in a passible body, being immortal, He was in a mortal body, being life, He became subject to corruption, that He might free our souls from death and corruption, and heal them, and might restore them to health when they were diseased with ungodliness and wicked lusts.

— Letter to the Ephesians, ch. 7, longer version

He stressed the value of the Eucharist, calling it a "medicine of immortality" (Ignatius to the Ephesians 20:2). He regarded persecution and suffering as conferring grace and earnestly longed for his own martyrdom.

Ignatius is claimed to be the first known Christian writer to argue in favor of Christianity's replacement of the Sabbath with the Lord's Day:

Be not seduced by strange doctrines nor by antiquated fables, which are profitless. For if even unto this day we live after the manner of Judaism, we avow that we have not received grace. ...If then those who had walked in ancient practices attained unto newness of hope, no longer observing Sabbaths but fashioning their lives after the Lord's day, on which our life also arose through Him ... how shall we be able to live apart from Him?

— Ignatius to the Magnesians 8:1, 9:1–2, Joseph Barber Lightfoot translation.

If, therefore, those who were brought up in the ancient order of things have come to the possession of a new hope, no longer observing the Sabbath, but living in the observance of the Lord's day, on which also our life has sprung up again by Him and by His death – whom some deny, by which mystery we have obtained faith, and therefore endure, that we may be found the disciples of Jesus Christ, our only Master – how shall we be able to live apart from Him, whose disciples the prophets themselves in the Spirit did wait for Him as their Teacher? And therefore He whom they rightly waited for, being come, raised them from the dead.

— Letter to the Magnesians 9, Roberts and Donaldson translation, p. 189.

This passage has provoked textual debate since the only Greek manuscript extant read Κατα κυριακήν ζωήν ζωντες which could be translated "living according to the Lord's life". Most scholars, however, have followed the Latin text (secundum dominicam) omitting ζωήν and translating "living according to Lord's Day".

=== Ecclesiology ===
Ignatius is the earliest known Christian writer to emphasize loyalty to a single bishop in each city (or diocese) who is assisted by both presbyters (elders) (Note: Although the English word "priest" is derived from "πρεσβύτερος presbyteros" (literally meaning "old man" or "elder"), there is no clear evidence that this Greek word's original, intended usage among Biblical and early Patristic writers was of a sacramental priesthood, or even as being synonymous with the position of "pastor," as it has been used in Catholicism. Hence the comparatively very different usage of the term by, for example, the Christian denomination of Presbyterianism (which defines a presbyter as one of several senior leading members of a local church body).) and deacons. Earlier writings only mention either bishops or presbyters.

For instance, his writings on bishops, presbyters and deacons:

Take care to do all things in harmony with God, with the bishop presiding in the place of God, and with the presbyters in the place of the council of the apostles, and with the deacons, who are most dear to me, entrusted with the business of Jesus Christ, who was with the Father from the beginning and is at last made manifest.

— Letter to the Magnesians 2, 6:1.

He is also responsible for the first known use of the Greek word katholikos (καθολικός), or catholic, meaning "universal", "complete", "general", and/or "whole" to describe the Church, writing:

Wherever the bishop appears, there let the people be; as wherever Jesus Christ is, there is the Catholic Church. It is not lawful to baptize or give communion without the consent of the bishop. On the other hand, whatever has his approval is pleasing to God. Thus, whatever is done will be safe and valid.

— Letter to the Smyrnaeans 8, J.R. Willis translation.

Anglican bishop and theologian Joseph Lightfoot states the word "catholic (καθόλου)" meant "universal" to Ignatius, as that term was commonly used at the time by classical and ecclesiastical writers. Later usages of "Catholic Church" denote a particular church with orthodox beliefs and apostolic succession, as opposed to heretical or schismatic church bodies. Ignatius of Antioch is also attributed one of the earliest uses of the term "Christianity" (Greek: Χριστιανισμός) c. 100 AD.

== Parallels with Peregrinus Proteus ==
Several scholars have noted that there are striking similarities between Ignatius and the Christian-turned-Cynic philosopher Peregrinus Proteus, who is satirized by Lucian in The Passing of Peregrinus:

- Both Ignatius and Peregrinus show a morbid eagerness to die;
- Both are or have been, Christians;
- Both are imprisoned by Roman authorities;
- Upon the arrest of both prisoners, Christians from all over Asia Minor come to visit them and bring them gifts; (cf. Peregrinus 12–13).
- Both prisoners send letters to several Greek cities shortly before their deaths as "testaments, counsels, and laws", appointing "couriers" and "ambassadors" for the purpose.

It is generally believed that these parallels are the result of Lucian intentionally copying traits from Ignatius and applying them to his satire of Peregrinus. If the dependence of Lucian on the Ignatian epistles is accepted, then this places an upper limit on the date of the epistles during the 160s AD, just before The Passing of Peregrinus was written.

In 1892, Daniel Völter sought to explain the parallels by proposing that the Ignatian epistles were in fact written by Peregrinus, and later attributed to the saint, but this speculative theory has failed to make a significant impact on the academic community.

== Pseudo-Ignatius ==
Epistles attributed to Saint Ignatius, but of spurious origin (their author is often called Pseudo-Ignatius in English) include:

- Epistle to the Tarsians;
- Epistle to the Antiochians;
- Epistle to Hero, a Deacon of Antioch;
- Epistle to the Philippians;
- Epistle of Maria the Proselyte to Ignatius;
- Epistle to Mary at Neapolis, Zarbus;
- First Epistle to St. John;
- Second Epistle to St. John;
- Epistle of Ignatius to the Virgin Mary.

== See also ==
- Apostolic succession
- Christianity in the 1st century
- Christianity in the 2nd century
- Early centers of Christianity
- List of Patriarchs of Antioch
- Saint Ignatius of Antioch, patron saint archive
- Apostolic Fathers
- Clementine literature
- Catholicity
- Ignatius of Loyola

== Bibliography ==
- Zuiddam, Benno A. (1997). "Holy Letters and Syllables, the function and character of Scripture Authority in the writings of St Ignatius" (PDF). Ned. Geref. Teoligiese Tydskrif. 38 (3). Archived (PDF) from the original on 17 October 2022.

Titles of the Great Christian Church
Preceded by Evodius	Bishop of Antioch; 68–107	Succeeded by Herodion
