= Epistle of Ignatius to the Smyrnaeans =

C. 110 AD epistle attributed to Ignatius of Antioch

The Epistle of Ignatius to the Smyrnaeans (often simply called Smyrnaeans) is an epistle from circa 110 AD attributed to Ignatius of Antioch, a first-century bishop of Antioch, addressed to the early Christians in Smyrna.

== Composition ==
Smyrnaeans is one of seven epistles attributed to Ignatius that are generally accepted as authentic. In the fifth century, this collection was enlarged by spurious letters.

It is clear that Smyrnaeans was written soon before the martyrdom of Ignatius, but it is uncertain when precisely this martyrdom occurred. Tradition places the martyrdom of Ignatius in the reign of Trajan, who was emperor of Rome from 98 to 117 AD. While many scholars accept the traditional dating of Ignatius' martyrdom under Trajan, others have argued for a somewhat later date. Richard Pervo dated Ignatius' death to 135–140 AD, and British classicist Timothy Barnes has argued for a date some time in the 140s AD.

J. D. Atkins finds connections with the Gospel of Luke. According to Mark Goodacre, the reference to “Herod the Tetrarch” and Smyrn. 3.2 likely shows Ignatius’s knowledge of Luke.

== Content ==
The epistle mentions the resurrection of Jesus: "Now, he suffered all these things for our sake, that we might be saved. And he truly suffered, even as he truly raised himself up; not as certain unbelievers say, that he suffered in semblance, they themselves only existing in semblance" (2:1a). The term translated "semblance" is the Greek word "dokein" (δοκεῖν, "to seem"). This word is that from which the heresy of docetism (the heresy that the body of Jesus was merely a projected illusion) got its name. The primary purpose of the letter to the Smyrnaeans is to counter those who make the claims of docetism.

To counter the teaching of the Docetists, who claimed that Jesus did not come in the flesh, Ignatius wrote the first 7 sections demonstrating the real incarnation of Jesus, thus saying about the Eucharist:

"They [the docetists] abstain from the Eucharist and from prayer, because they confess not the Eucharist to be the flesh of our Saviour Jesus Christ, which suffered for our sins, and which the Father, of His goodness, raised up again. They who deny the gift of God are perishing in their disputes" (7:1).

At the same time, the practice of Christian charity – "care for the widow, or the orphan, or the oppressed; of the bond, or of the free; of the hungry, or of the thirsty" – is held out to be a mark of the true faith in contrast to the behaviour of "those who are of a different opinion".

The letter is also the earliest recorded evidence of the use of the term "Catholic Church". Saint Ignatius, who wrote some 900 years before the Great Schism, uses the term "Catholic" to mean the "Universal Church" (as the term "Catholic" comes from the Greek katholikos, meaning "universal").

The letter emphasizes the importance for the community of Smyrnaeans to follow the bishop:

“Do ye all follow your bishop, as Jesus Christ followed the Father ... Let no man do aught [anything whatever] of things pertaining to the Church apart from the bishop.” (8:1),
"He who honors the bishop has been honoured by God; he who does anything without the knowledge of the bishop, does [in reality] serve the devil" (9).

The letter emphasizes the power the bishop has, which as a result other members of the Church lack.

“Let that be held a valid Eucharist which is under the bishop ... It is not lawful apart from the bishop either to baptize or to hold a love-feast" (8:1,8:2).

== See also ==
- Christianity in the 1st century
- Christianity in the 2nd century
- Early centers of Christianity
- Early Christianity
- History of early Christianity
- List of Patriarchs of Antioch
