= Epistle of Polycarp to the Philippians =

Letter from Polycarp to the church in Philippi

The Epistle of Polycarp to the Philippians, commonly abbreviated Pol. Phil., is an epistle attributed to Polycarp, an early bishop of Smyrna, and addressed to the early Christian church in Philippi. It is widely believed to be a composite of material written at two different times in the first half of the second century. The epistle is described by Irenaeus as follows:

There is also a forceful epistle written by Polycarp to the Philippians, from which those who wish to do so, and are anxious about their salvation, can learn the character of his faith, and the preaching of the truth.

The epistle is one of a number believed to have been written by Polycarp, but is the only extant document.

== Manuscript tradition ==
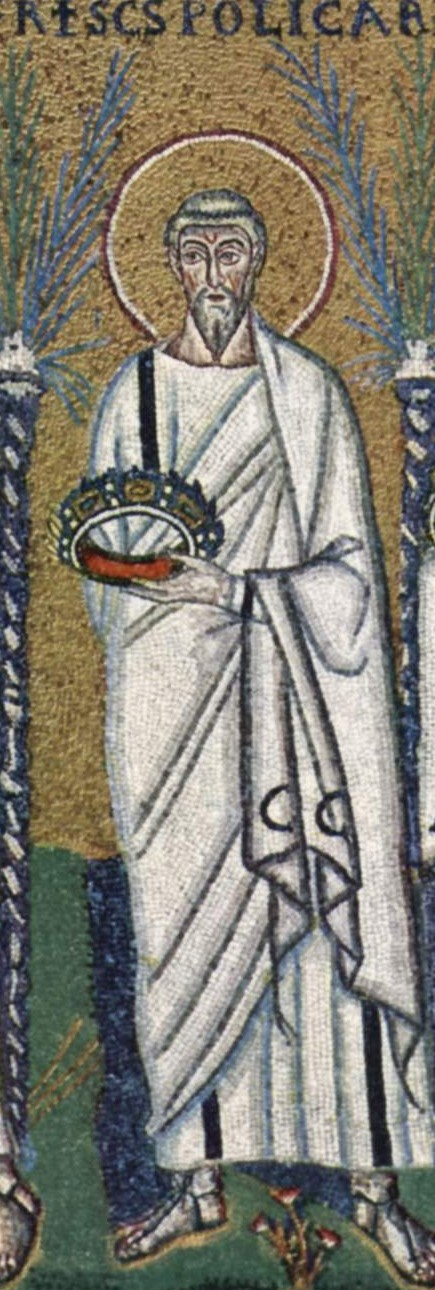
Mosaic of Polycarp in Ravenna.

The epistle was composed in Greek, but the Greek text has not been preserved in its entirety. Eight Greek manuscripts are known, but in each the text is defective and incomplete. The oldest Greek witness is Vaticanus Graecus 859 from the 11th–13th centuries, but most are from the 15th–16th centuries.

There is a complete Latin translation of the epistle. It survives in 13 or 14 manuscripts, the earliest perhaps from the 9th century. The quality of the Latin text is disputed, but it is based on a Greek text older than the existing Greek stemma.

A few excerpts of the epistle are preserved in Syriac. These include parts of chapters 5, 7 and 12.

There is an Armenian translation based on Vaticanus Graecus 859.

== Authorship and unity ==
Scholars generally agree that Pol. Phil. is an authentic epistle of Polycarp. One potential objection to the authenticity of the epistle, however, is the apparent chronological inconsistency between Chapters 9 and 13. In Chapter 9,

I exhort you all, therefore, to yield obedience to the word of righteousness, and to exercise all patience, such as you have seen [set] before your eyes, not only in the case of the blessed Ignatius, and Zosimus, and Rufus... they are [now] in their due place in the presence of the Lord, with whom also they suffered. For they loved not this present world, but Him who died for us, and for our sakes was raised again by God from the dead. (emphasis added)

— Polycarp's Epistle to the Philippians, Chapter 9

But in Chapter 13, Polycarp refers to a letter sent to him quite recently by Ignatius (see the Epistle of Ignatius to Polycarp), and seems to be unaware of Ignatius' ultimate fate:

Both you and Ignatius wrote to me, that if any one went into Syria, he should carry your letter with him...Any more certain information you may have obtained respecting both Ignatius himself, and those that are with him, have the goodness to make known to us.

— Pol. Phil. Chapter 13

Various efforts have been made to explain this seeming discrepancy. The most widely accepted proposal was put forward by Pearcy Neale Harrison in 1936, arguing that the Epistle is actually a merger of two authentic letters of Polycarp.

The first letter, written just before Ignatius' death, would consist of Chapter 13 and possibly also Chapter 14. It would have served as a short Cover Letter for the epistles of Ignatius, to which it refers explicitly:

The Epistles of Ignatius written by him to us, and all the rest [of his Epistles] which we have by us, we have sent to you, as you requested. They are subjoined to this Epistle, and by them you may be greatly profited; for they treat of faith and patience, and all things that tend to edification in our Lord.

— Pol. Phil. he argued that the epistle is actually a composite of two authentic letters of Polycarp written at different times. Chapter 13

The second letter, written many years later, would constitute the bulk of the epistle (Chapters 1–12). Harrison named this letter the Crisis Letter, because it seems to have been written in response to a crisis in the Philippian church, in which its presbyter Valens was removed from his post for "covetousness" (Chapter 11).

These two letters would have been compiled together, either accidentally or intentionally, by a later editor. This view, or some variation of it, continues to enjoy widespread support among scholars, although some continue to argue for the unity of the epistle, while a few others argue that the Cover Letter is a late forgery and only the Crisis Letter is authentic.

== Date ==
Scholars' estimates for the Cover Letter (Pol. Phil. 13) are largely dependent on the dating of the epistles of Ignatius, to which they explicitly refer. Traditionally, the Ignatian epistles are dated to around the year 108 AD during the reign of the Roman emperor Trajan, based on the writings of the 4th century church historian Eusebius of Caesarea. However, some modern scholars have questioned this view, arguing for a date in the 130s or 140s AD (see Ignatius of Antioch). In that case, the Cover Letter would be dated correspondingly later.

The Crisis Letter (Pol. Phil. 1–12) would date some time after Ignatius' death, but it is unclear precisely how much later it might have been written. Polycarp's death, which occurred around 155-167 AD, sets an upper limit. P. N. Harrison, who accepted the traditional Trajanic date of the epistles of Ignatius, dated the Crisis Letter to around 135-137 CE

If one accepts the minority view that Pol. Phil. is a unified letter, then the epistle as a whole would date to around the same time as the epistles of Ignatius of Antioch.

== Content ==
Polycarp speaks of the proper living of wives, widows, deacons, younger men, virgins and elders (4–6) and offers prescriptions for how a Christian community ought to be organized and to conduct itself.

Wives:

- [Being taught in] faith given them
- Love
- Purity
- Feeling affection for husbands "in all truth"
- Loving all equally "with all self-restraint"
- To teach children in "the reverential fear of God"

Widows:

- Being self-controlled "concerning the faith of the Lord"
- Interceding incessantly concerning everyone
- Knowing that they are "an altar of God"
- Perhaps: inspecting others and/or being inspected

Deacons:

- Being blameless as ministers of God and Christ, not people
- Free of love of money
- Self-restrained "in every way"
- Compassionate
- Attentive
- Proceeding "according to the truth of the Lord, who became a deacon/minister for everyone"

Younger men:

- Being blameless "in all things"
- Concerned about purity above all else
- Keeping themselves in check "with respect to all evil"

Virgins:

- Walking "in a blameless and pure conscience"

Elders:

- Being compassionate
- Being merciful to all
- Turning back those who have strayed
- Visiting all the weak/sick
- Always taking thought for the good "in the sight of God and people"
- Knowing that "we are all in debt because of sin"

Philippians 1:2 may refer to Acts 2:24 in the line ‘loosed the pangs of death/Hades.’ Widows’ most significant mention is in Pol. Phil. 4.3, where they are spoken of as "knowing that they are an altar of God". He invokes it without clarification of its meaning. This in itself is notable because he seems to presume that his audience will understand why he employs this particular figure of speech and will know upon what discourses he draws in so doing. Perhaps this is an image with which Polycarp assumes his intended audience will be familiar. This is one of a number of such references in eight early Christian texts generally dated to the second through the fifth centuries AD. In addition to Pol. Phil., these texts are: Tertullian Ad uxorem, Methodius' Symposium, the Didascalia Apostolorum, the Apostolic Constitutions, Pseudo-Ignatius' letter To the Tarsians, Gregory of Nazianzus' Funeral Oration on His Father, and the Testamentum Domini.

Margaret Butterfield concludes the following:

The text here allows for the possibility of widows as attending to the conduct of community members, perhaps in order to ensure their worthiness for intercession. And; "Widows alone are portrayed as providing the connecting link to God. What is perhaps even more striking is that when we step back and look at this entire shifting set of identifications, the cast of characters remains the same: God, the widows, and the community. As portrayed in this brief passage, these are the only participants needed for engaging in this sort of human–divine contact. There is no mention here of elders or deacons—or priests. The community more generally, but widows in particular, emerge from this passage as the principal ritual officiants." With regard to the meaning of the metaphor it is suggested that perhaps inspecting others and/or being inspected was his other job in the community.

The epistle warns against a number of disorders in the church and against apostasy, and encourages the Christians to persevere in good works. It also acted as a covering letter for a collection of writings by Ignatius of Antioch, whose works were being collected by the church at Philippi after Ignatius' visit there.

Here is one quotation from the epistle:

Stand fast, therefore, in these things, and follow the example of the Lord, being firm and unchangeable in the faith, loving the brotherhood, and being attached to one another, joined together in the truth, exhibiting the meekness of the Lord in your intercourse with one another, and despising no one.

— Pol. Phil. Chapter 10

Another, used by Pope Leo XIV in his apostolic exhortation on love for the poor (2025), states that

Presbyters [should] be compassionate and merciful to all, bringing back those that wander, visiting all the sick, and not neglecting the widow, the orphan, or the poor, but always "providing for that which is becoming in the sight of God and man".

One of the epistle's more important features is its use and citation of other early Christian writings, many of which later came to be part of the New Testament. The epistle has even been described as "pastiche-like", due to its heavy use of allusions and citations to other writings, which make up a large portion of the text.

In Chapter 7, Polycarp exhorts the Philippians to reject various heretical doctrines, but never mentions any particular heretics by name. For example, he attacks docetism, the belief that Jesus did not appear on Earth in the flesh, by citing the First Epistle of John: ("For whosoever does not confess that Jesus Christ has come in the flesh, is an antichrist"). He also attacks unnamed individuals who claim that "there is neither a resurrection nor a judgment," calling them "the first-born of Satan" (Pol. Phil. 7.1). Importantly, the Christian apologist Irenaeus of Lyon claimed in his book Against Heresies that Polycarp had called the unorthodox Christian thinker Marcion of Sinope "the first-born of Satan". This led P. N. Harrison to conclude that Polycarp was in fact referring to Marcion in this epistle, albeit at an early stage in Marcion's ideological development. Many other scholars, however, have found Harrison's argument to be unconvincing.

== Bibliography ==
- Paul Hartog, Polycarp's Epistle to the Philippians and the Martyrdom of Polycarp. Introduction, Text, and Commentary, New York, Oxford University Press, 2013.
- C. C. Richardson (ed.) Early Christian Fathers. Philadelphia. Westminster. 1953. reprinted Macmillan 1970.
