= Timothy Barnes (classicist) =

British classicist (born 1942)

Timothy Barnes FBA FRSC
- Born: Timothy David Barnes; 13 March 1942 (age 84); Yorkshire, England
- Education: Balliol College, Oxford (BA); Queen's College, Oxford (DPhil)
- Occupation: Historian
- Employer: University of Edinburgh
- Awards: Conington Prize, Philip Schaff Prize

Timothy David Barnes FBA FRSC (born 13 March 1942) is a British classicist.

== Biography ==
Barnes was born in Yorkshire on 13 March 1942. He was educated at Queen Elizabeth Grammar School, Wakefield, until 1960, going up to Balliol College, Oxford, where he read Literae Humaniores, taking his B.A. in 1964 and M.A. in 1967. He was Harmsworth Senior Scholar of Merton College, Oxford, 1964–66 and Junior Research Fellow of The Queen's College, Oxford, 1966–70. He was awarded his D.Phil. in 1970. In 1974 the University of Oxford conferred upon him the Conington prize.

On receiving his doctorate he was immediately appointed assistant professor of Classics at University College, University of Toronto, and in 1972 he was appointed associate professor. In 1976 he became professor of Classics, a post he held for thirty-one years until his retirement in 2007. He was three times associate chairman of Classics (1979–83, 1986–89, 1995–96). In the year 1976/7 he was a visiting member of the Institute for Advanced Study. 1983/4 he was Visiting Fellow of Wolfson College, Oxford and 1984/5 he was Connaught Senior Fellow in the Humanities. In 1989 he was elected a Fellow of the University of Trinity College. He delivered the Townsend Lectures at Cornell University in 1994.

In 1982 he was awarded both the Philip Schaff Prize by the American Society of Church History for Constantine and Eusebius and the Charles J. Goodwin Award of Merit by the American Philological Association. In 1985 he was elected Fellow of the Royal Society of Canada and in 2009 Foreign Member of the Finnish Society of Sciences and Letters.

In December 2007, he officially retired from the University of Toronto, and returned to the United Kingdom. He is currently an honorary fellow at the University of Edinburgh's School of Divinity, working with the Centre for the Study of Christian Origins.

== Selected works ==
- Barnes, Timothy D (1971), Tertullian a historical and literary study, Oxford Clarendon Press, OCLC 265040582
- Barnes, Timothy David (1978), The sources of the Historia Augusta, Latomus, ISBN 978-2-87031-005-2
- Barnes, Timothy David (1981), Constantine and Eusebius, Harvard University Press, ISBN 978-0-674-16531-1
- Barnes, Timothy David (1982), The new empire of Diocletian and Constantine, London, ISBN 0-7837-2221-4
- Barnes, Timothy David (1984), Early Christianity and the Roman Empire, CS 207, Variorum Reprints, ISBN 978-0-86078-155-4, OCLC 251547581
- Barnes, Timothy David (1993), Athanasius and Constantius : theology and politics in the Constantinian empire, Harvard University Press, hdl:2027/heb.01088, ISBN 978-0-674-00549-5
- Barnes, Timothy D (1994), From Eusebius to Augustine : selected papers 1982 – 1993, Collected studies series, 438, Aldershot Variorum, ISBN 978-0-86078-397-8, OCLC 260175509
- Barnes, Timothy David (1998), Ammianus Marcellinus and the representation of historical reality, Cornell studies in classical philology, v. 56., Cornell University Press, ISBN 978-0-8014-3526-3
