= Richard Pervo =

American biblical scholar and Episcopal priest (1942-2017)

Richard I. Pervo
- Born: Richard Ivan Pervo; May 11, 1942; Lakewood, Ohio, U.S.
- Died: May 19, 2017 (aged 75); Saint Paul, Minnesota, U.S.
- Education: Harvard University
- Occupation: Biblical scholar

Richard Ivan Pervo (May 11, 1942 – May 19, 2017) was an American biblical scholar, former Episcopal priest, and Fellow of the Westar Institute. He was best known for his works on the New Testament book of Acts of the Apostles, where he was influential in bringing comparisons between Acts and ancient novels to mainstream discussion, though most scholars maintain that Acts is a historiography. In 2001, Pervo was convicted for possession of child sexual abuse material.

== Biography ==
Pervo was born in Lakewood, Ohio, the son of Ivan Pervo and Elizabeth Kline. He married Karen E. Moreland on April 2, 1967.

Pervo received his undergraduate degree from Concordia Senior College in Fort Wayne, Indiana in 1964. He received a Bachelor of Divinity at the Episcopal Divinity School of Cambridge, Massachusetts, and earned his Th.D. from Harvard University in 1979. A revised version of his dissertation was published in 1987 as Profit with Delight: The Literary Genre of the Acts of the Apostles.

Pervo died of leukemia in St. Paul, Minnesota on May 19, 2017. (Note: The obituary published by the Society of Biblical Literature gives his date of death as May 20, but this is contradicted by the majority of sources.)

== Career ==
Pervo taught at Seabury-Western Theological Seminary (1975–1999) and as professor of Classical and Near Eastern Studies at the University of Minnesota (1999–2001). He served as an Episcopal priest until 2003.

He was best known for his works on the New Testament book of Acts of the Apostles.

A Festschrift in recognition of his scholarship was published posthumously by Mohr Siebeck in late 2017.

== Reception ==
Richard Pervo’s work was influential in bringing comparisons between Acts and ancient novels to mainstream scholarly discussions. Nonetheless, most scholars maintain that Acts is a historiography, with Sean Adams noting Pervo’s lack of engagement with the preface of Acts and key differences with fictional novels.

== Criminal conviction ==
In February 2001, Pervo was arrested after investigators found thousands of images of child pornography on his work computer at the University of Minnesota. In May he pleaded guilty to five counts of possession and one count of distribution of child pornography. He was sentenced to one year in a state workhouse and eight years probation. He formally resigned from the University of Minnesota as of June 2001, having been suspended since his arrest. After serving his sentence he continued to publish theological works as an independent scholar and Fellow of the Westar Institute, and was recognized as an authority on the canonical and non-canonical books of Acts.

== Selected works ==
- Profit with Delight: The Literary Genre of the Acts of the Apostles (1987) ISBN 978-0800607821
- Luke's Story of Paul (1990) ISBN 978-0800624057
- Rethinking the Unity of Luke and Acts (with Mikael C. Parsons) (1993) ISBN 978-0800627508
- "Romancing an Oft-Neglected Stone: The Pastoral Epistles and The Epistolary Novel" (1994) Journal of the Higher Criticism, 1 (Fall 1994), 25–47.
- Dating Acts: Between the Evangelists and the Apologists (2006) ISBN 978-0944344736
- Acts: A Commentary (2008) ISBN 978-0800660451
- The Mystery of Acts: Unravelling its Story (2008) ISBN 978-1598150124
- The Making of Paul: Constructions of the Apostle in Early Christianity (2010) ISBN 978-0800696597
- The Acts of Paul: A New Translation with Introduction and Commentary (2014) ISBN 978-1625641717
- The Gospel of Luke (2014) ISBN 978-1598151411
- The Acts of John (2015) ISBN 978-1598151671
- The Pastorals and Polycarp (2016) ISBN 978-1598151787
