= Electuary =

Type of medicine

An electuary is a medicine consisting of a powder or other ingredient mixed with something sweet such as honey to make it more palatable.

In German and Swiss cultures, electuary (German: Latwerge or Latwerg) is also more generally a thickened juice and honey preparation with a thick, viscous consistency that is used in for culinary purposes, such as a (bread) spread or as a sauce ingredient.

In the Indian Ayurveda tradition, electuaries are called Lēhya (लेह्य) (literally, "lickable").

== Types ==
There are several different types of electuary: laxative electuary, joyful electuary, etc. The fermentation of mixed herbs in honey and their effects on each other are said to increase the medical properties already present and to create new ones.

== Famous electuaries in medicine ==
- Chyawanprash
- Diasenna
- Mithridate
- Faroug
- Figra
- Sootira
