= Smokehouse =

Building where meat or fish is cured with smoke

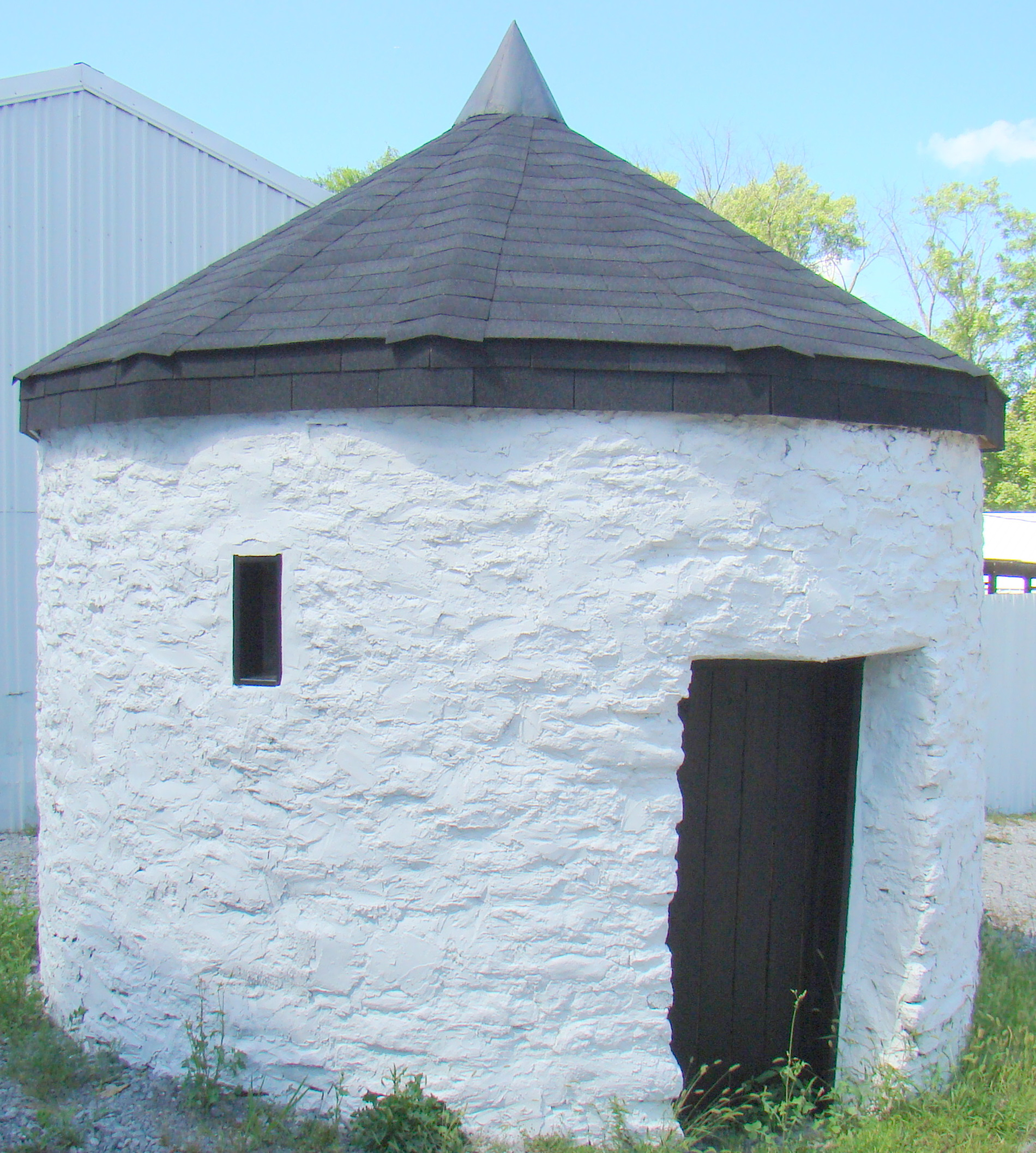
Reitman's Smokehouse, Camp Springs, Kentucky

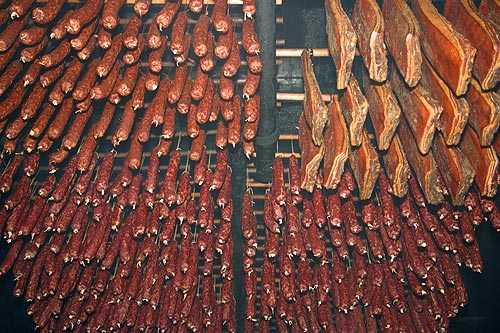
Meat hanging inside a smokehouse in Switzerland

A smokehouse (North American) or smokery (British) is a building where meat or fish is cured with smoke. The finished product might be stored in the building, sometimes for a year or more. Even when smoke is not used, such a building—typically a subsidiary building—is sometimes referred to as a "smokehouse". When smoke is not used, the term meathouse or meat house is common.

== History ==
Traditional smokehouses served both as meat smokers and to store the meats, often for groups and communities of people. Food preservation occurred by salt curing and extended cold smoking for two weeks or longer. Smokehouses were always secured to prevent animals and thieves from accessing the food. The meat is hung to keep it from the reach of vermin.

== Design and use ==
Traditionally, a smokehouse is a small enclosed outbuilding often with a vent, a single entrance, no windows, and frequently has a gabled or pyramid-style roof. Communal and commercial smokehouses are larger than those that served a single residence or estate. The use of slightly warmed, dry air from a very slow hardwood fire will ensure the proper drying of meats.

Smokehouses

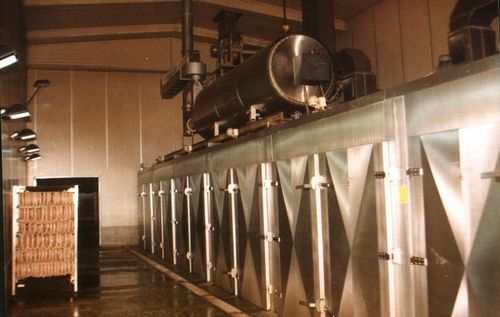
An industrial smokehouse in Poland.

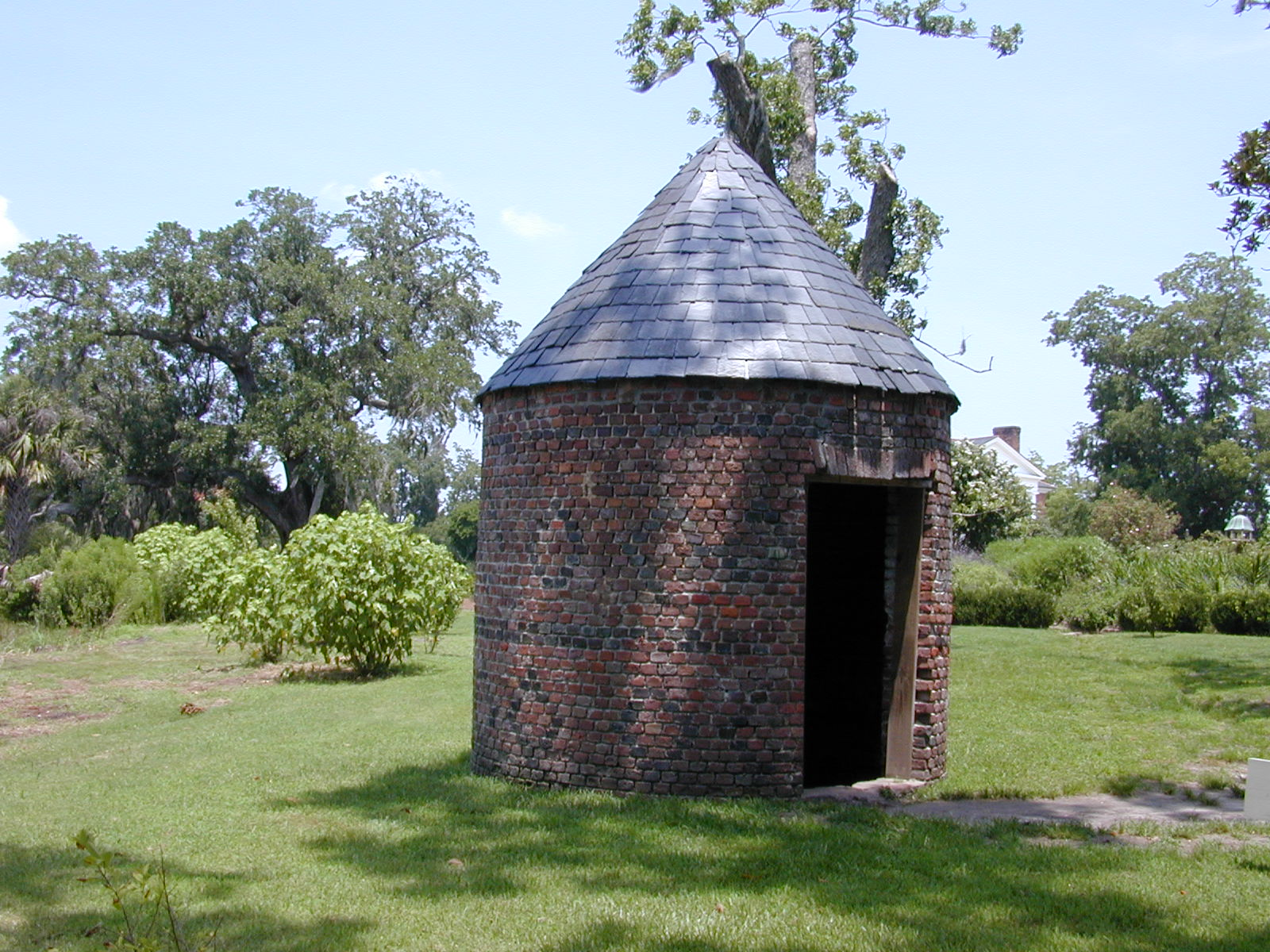
A smoke house at Boone Hall Plantation.

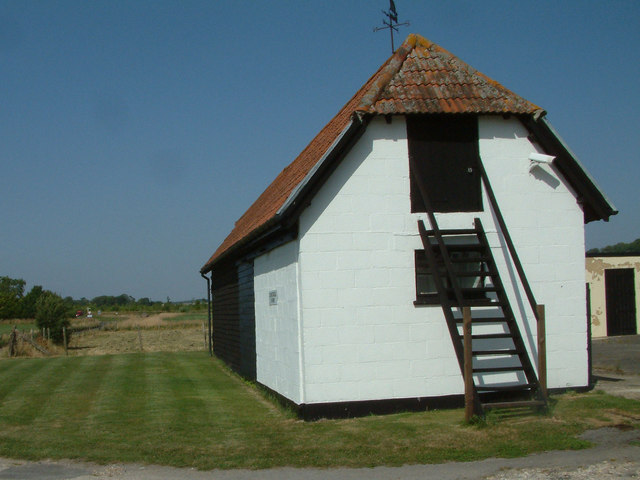
Fjordling Smokehouse. This smokehouse can be found at Dunstable Farm, Salisbury. The outbuilding shown is typical of this Wiltshire valley.

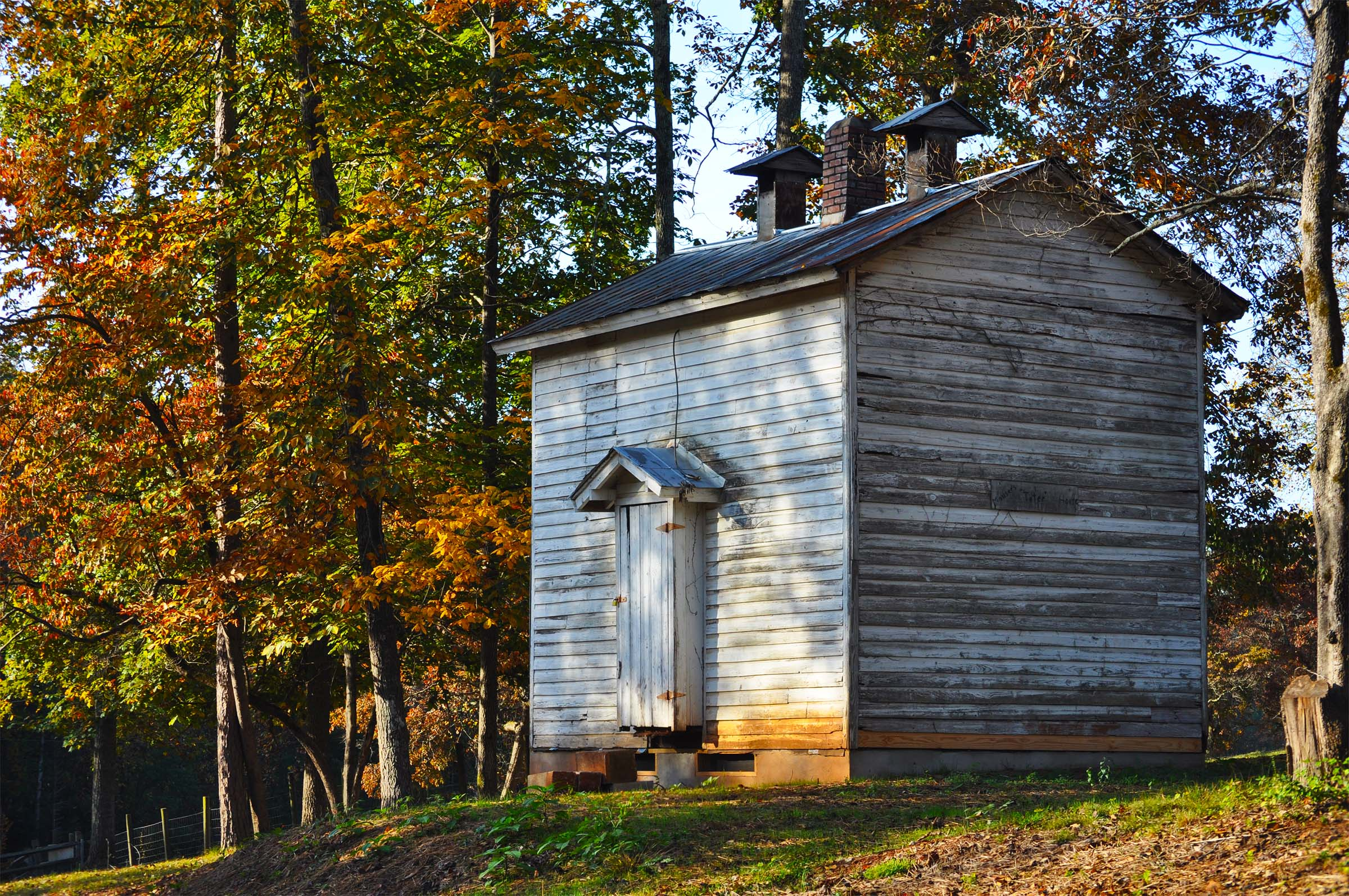
Smokehouse, North Carolina, Piedmont Region

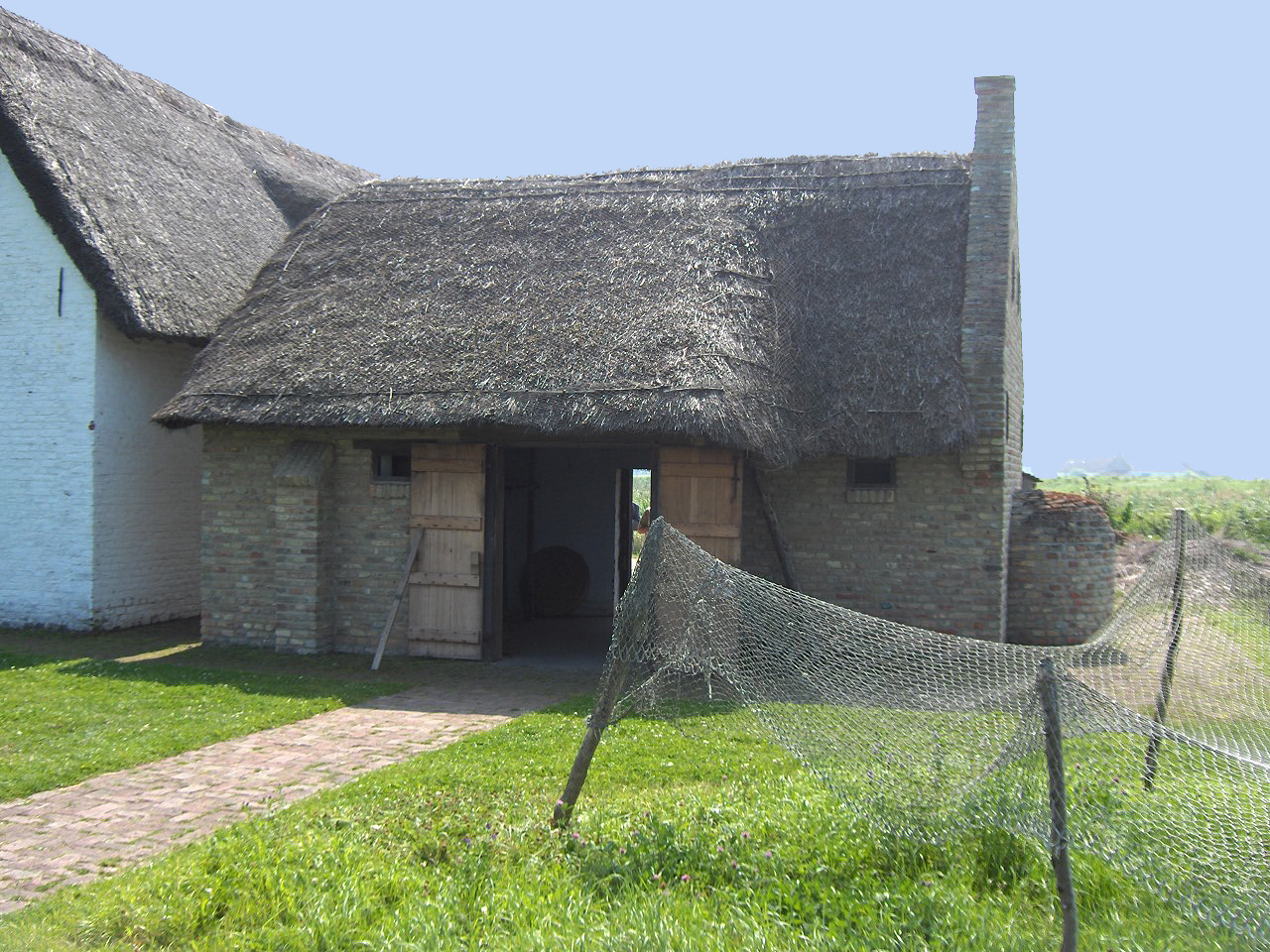
Reconstruction of medieval smokehouse at the fishing village of Walraversijde, c. 1465

== See also ==
- List of smoked foods
