= Walraversijde =

Former medieval fishing village in Belgium

Walraversyde
- Walraversijde
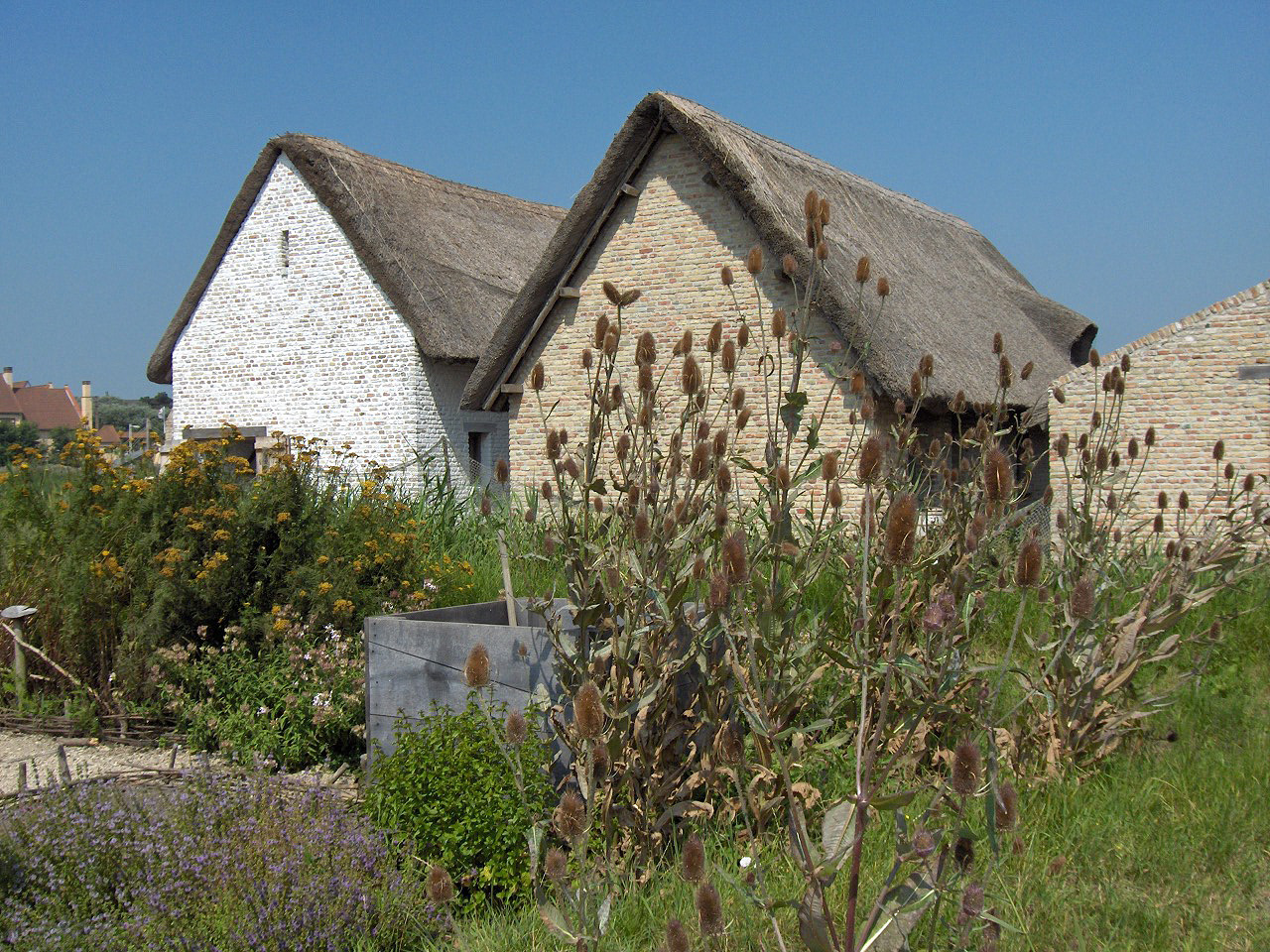
- Reconstructed 15th-century houses on the site
- Established: June 24, 2000
- Location: Ostend, West Flanders, Belgium
- Coordinates: 51°11′59″N 2°50′54″E
- Type: [Archaeological site]
- Curator: Marnix Pieters

Walraversijde is an abandoned medieval fishing village on the Belgian coast, near Ostend. It was rediscovered in 1992 in a dune area, near a medieval dyke. Archeological research showed that it had been occupied, in two phases, between 1200 and 1600. Walraversijde has been studied more thoroughly and more systematically than any other medieval fishing community in Europe. The village has been partially reconstructed and has a museum, Walraversijde Museum, dedicated to the site.

== Discovery ==
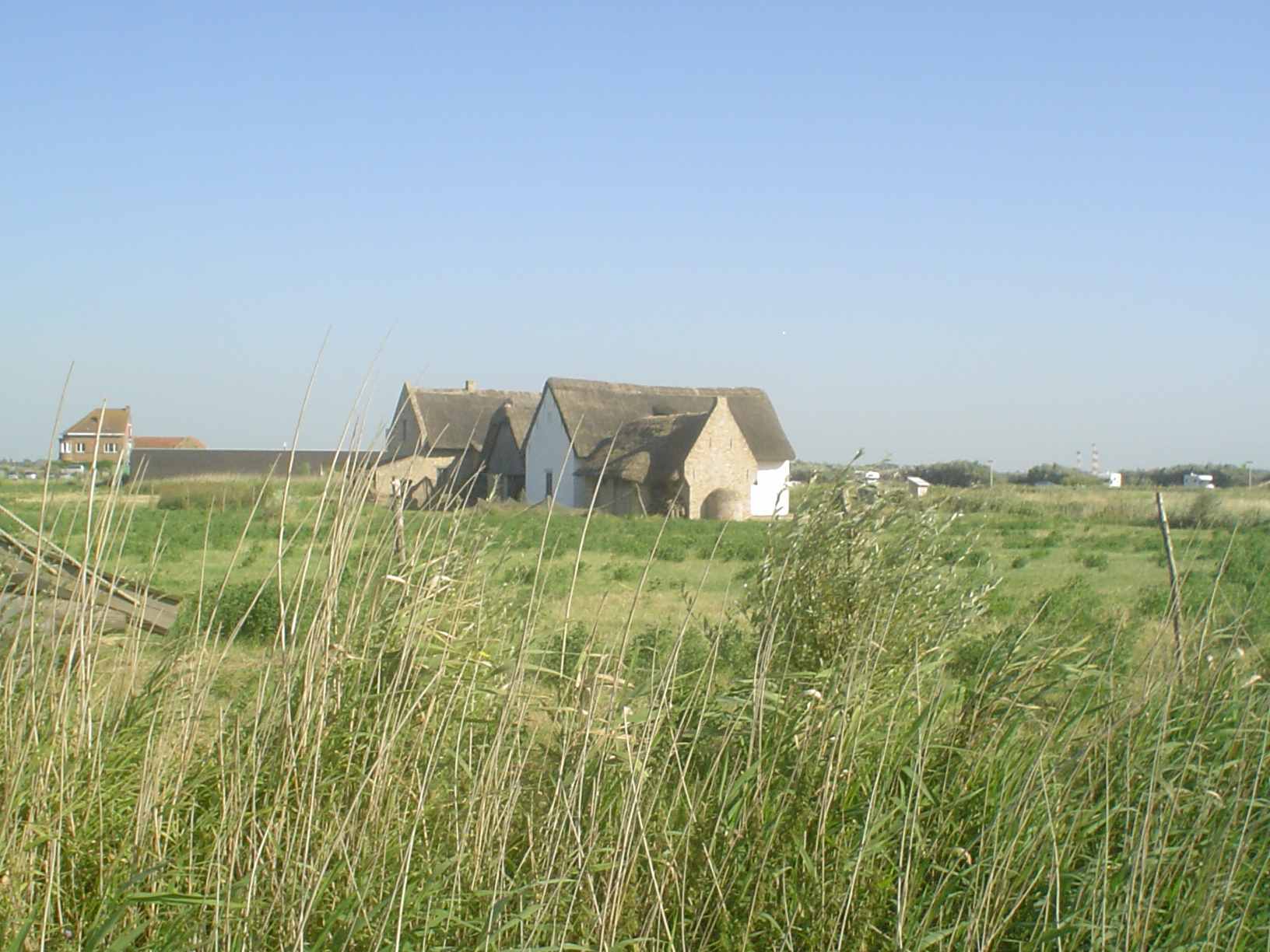
Fifteenth century fishermen cottages have been reconstructed at the archeological site of Walraversijde; ca. 1465

Walraversijde was discovered in 1992 on the Belgian coast by the archeologist Marnix Pieters. It was found in a dune area near a medieval dyke. Prior to discovery, Walraversijde was a lost village, with no obvious remains above ground. Two related sites were excavated, one on a beach and the other on a polder. The beach site was inhabited between 1200 and 1400, and the polder site was inhabited between 1400 and 1600. The excavations also found evidence of activities during the Roman era, such as a Roman dyke.

Location of Walraversijde on the Belgian coast

Walraversijde ceased having a role after the Siege of Ostend of 1601–1604 when a Spanish cavalry camp operated from the site. The artefacts and remains are well preserved, and there have been many finds. The sites have been excavated systematically and thoroughly, and have produced unusually rich findings.

== Early village ==
The village of the earlier beach phase of Walraversijde was located behind a protective dune belt. The houses were arranged in small, loose groups, the largest house measuring 7 by 12 metres (23 by 39 ft). Written sources indicate the villagers fished, traded salted fish and other goods, and sometimes engaged in piracy. They probably also dug peat to produce salt. However, the dune belt was maintained badly and Walraversijde became vulnerable. In 1394, a flood drowned the town of Ostend and caused heavy sand drifts and floods around the village. Walraversijde ended up in front of the dunes and had to be rebuilt further inland.

== Later village ==
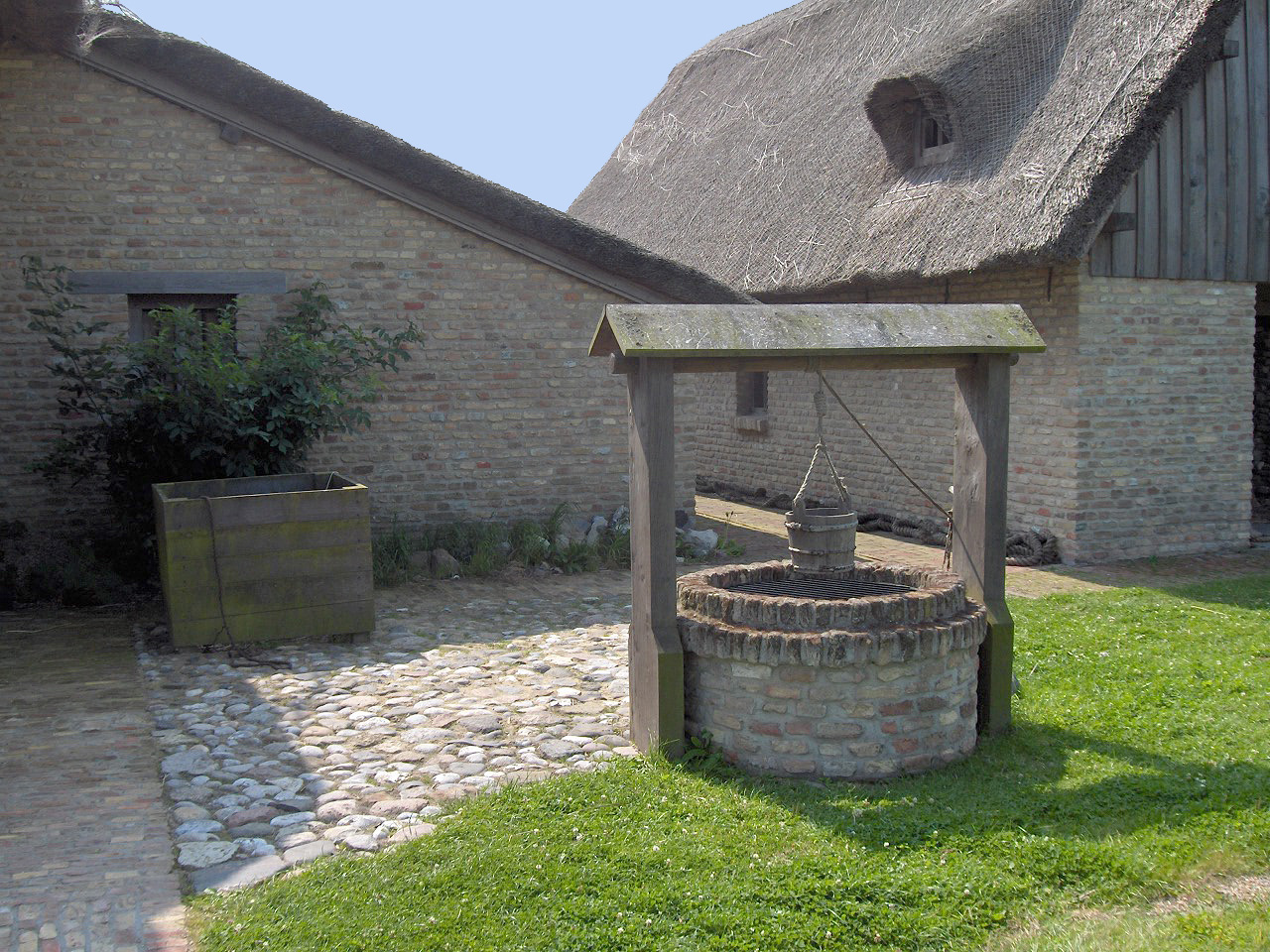
Well at the reconstructed archeological site of Walraversijde; ca. 1465

The new Walraversijde was relocated on a polder protected by a new dyke. At least 100 houses were built, with widths between 3.7 and 8.8 metres (12 and 29 ft) and lengths between 12.4 and 17.5 metres (41 and 57 ft). They were built mainly using brick, often plastered inside and outside. Some houses had stained windows. Floors were brick or sand-covered clay, and roofs were thatched with reeds, straw, or galingale.

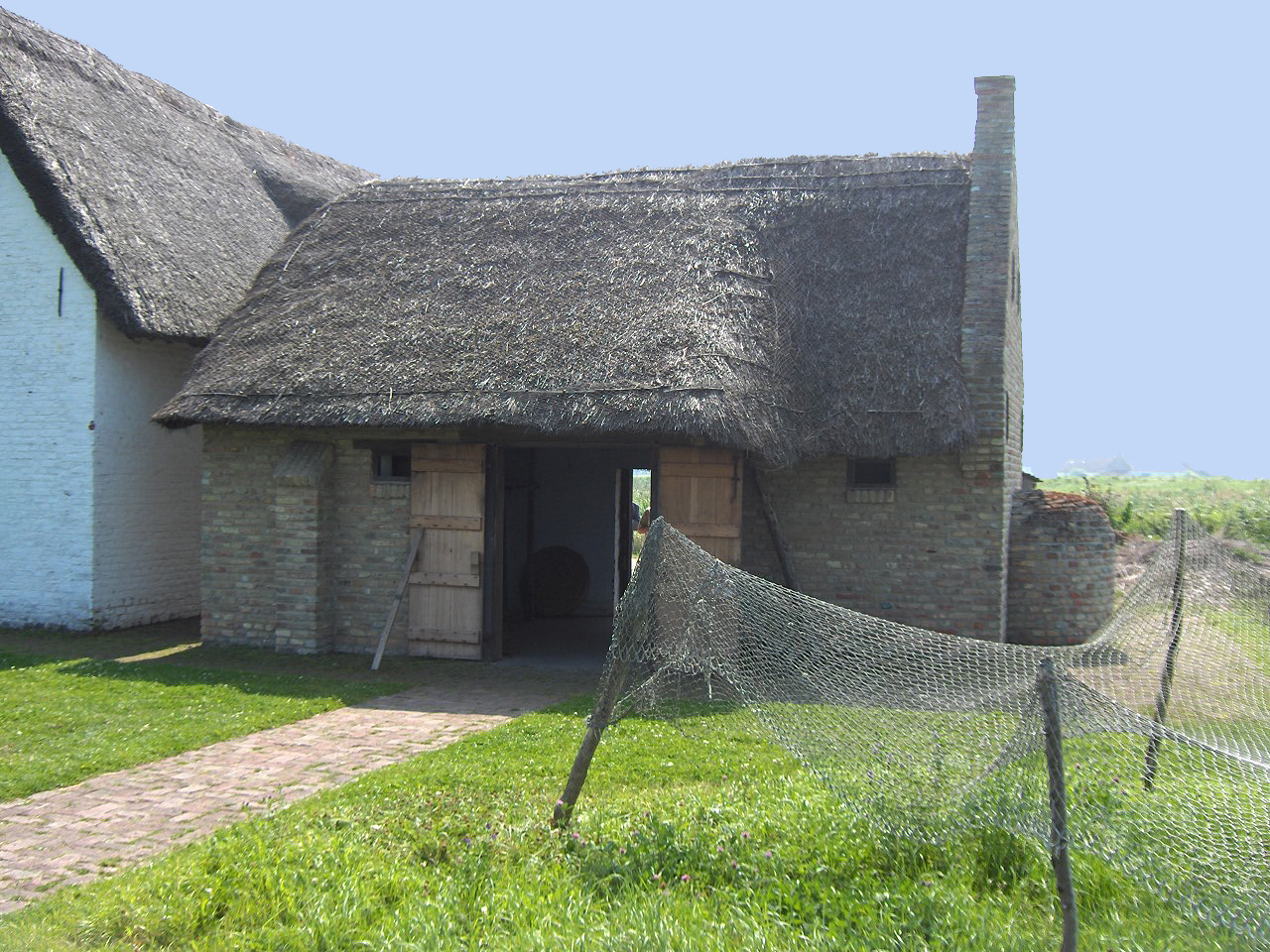
Reconstructed bakery and fish smokehouse; ca. 1465

There were also community spaces, such as a draeyplaetsen for making cordage, a brewery, and a caetsspel (gaming house and brothel). Around 1435 a chapel was built. As might be expected for a settlement preoccupied with the sea, the occupation density was much higher than in non-fishing rural communities. No spaces were set aside for stables, gardens, or fields between houses.

Between 1383 and 1413, under the supervision of the admirals of the Count of Flanders and the Duke of Burgundy, privateering and piracy took place between English and Flemish fishing and trading vessels. The fishermen of Walraversijde participated in this privateering to the degree that they were warned not to plunder or damage ships at sea unless ordered to do so by the duke. In addition to acting as privateers under the orders of the duke, Walraversijde fishermen supplied the duke's fleet with vessels and the fishing fleet with guard boats throughout the fifteenth century.

The villagers had commodities one might not expect to find in a medieval fishing community. There were "exotic spices such as paradise grains, cloves, and pepper, exotic fruits such as pomegranates, ivory combs, cast bronze candlesticks, and luxury ceramics." The piracy, privateering and also beachcombing must have played a part in this, as probably also did the piloting of Spanish merchant vessels by Walraversijde fisherman to the port of Bruges.

By the middle of the fifteenth century, Walraversijde reached its heyday, becoming, both economically and politically, the most important village in the region. It was well populated, housing perhaps 500 to 600 people, though half the population was usually away at sea. The village operated about twenty fishing vessels, each crewed with between thirteen and twenty fishermen. The fishermen were individually free and independent, brought their own nets, and shared in the profits. The sciplieden (boat captains) owned the fishing vessels and were the central figures in the village at the top of the social hierarchy.

Later in the fifteenth century, larger vessels were developed which could sail to the lucrative offshore fishing grounds of the Doggerbank. Purchasing these vessels required money which the fishermen did not have. Rich fish merchants invested in the fleet, and the new ship owners or wards took control of the offshore fishing. The role of the captains diminished and the independent fishermen were reduced to wage fishermen.

== Restorations and artifacts ==
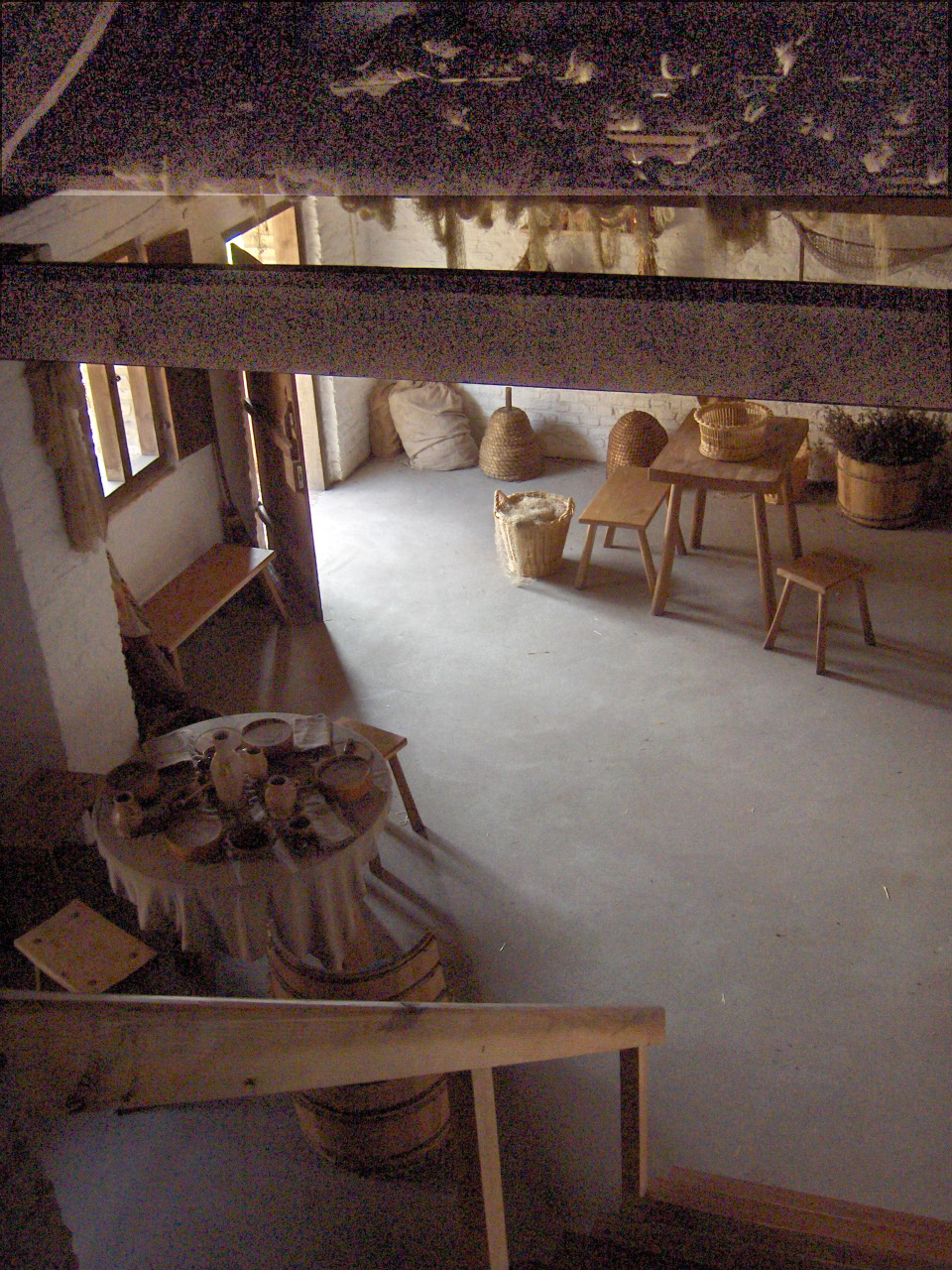
View from upstairs in a fisherman's house

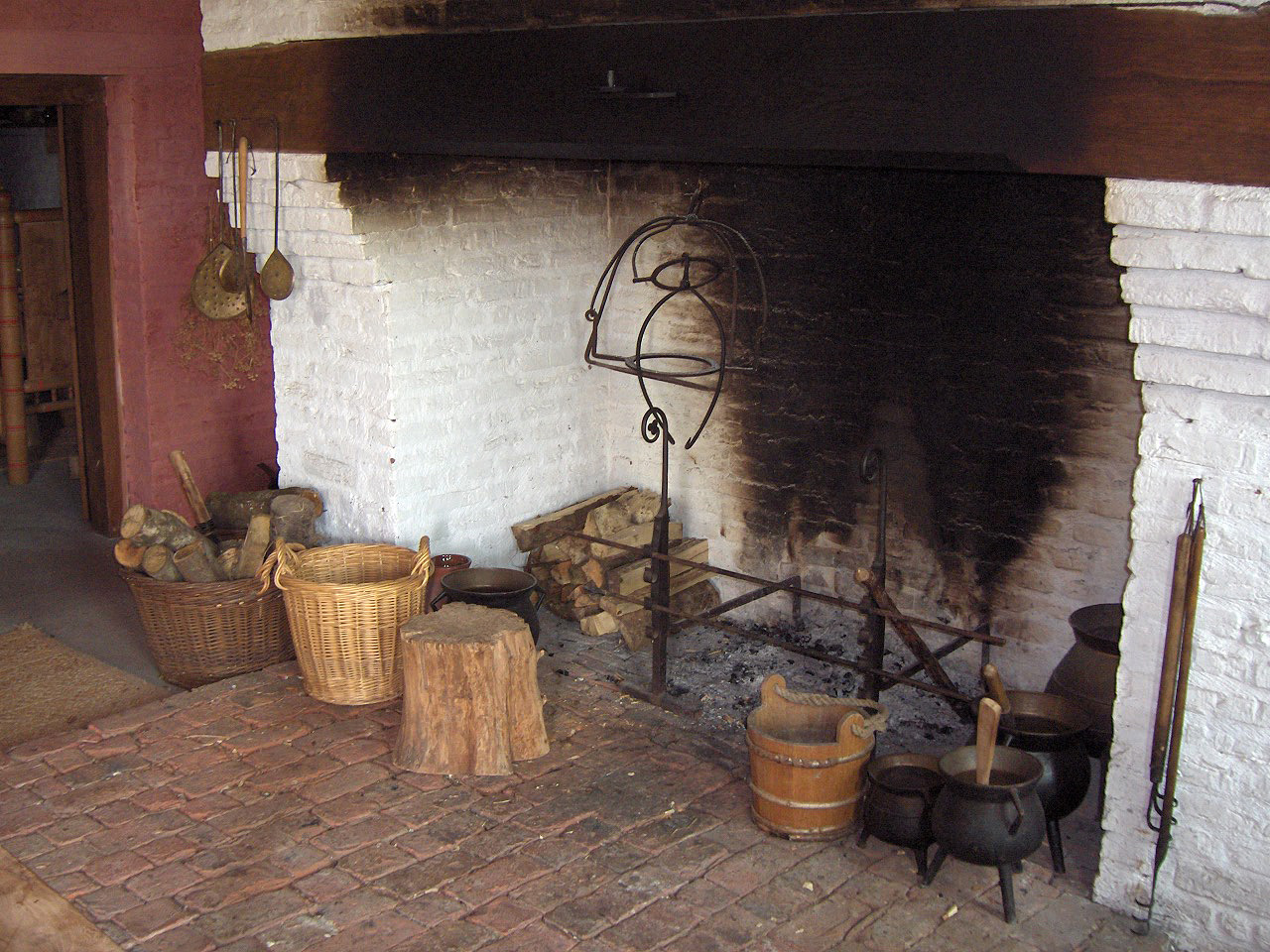
Medieval hearth with appurtenances

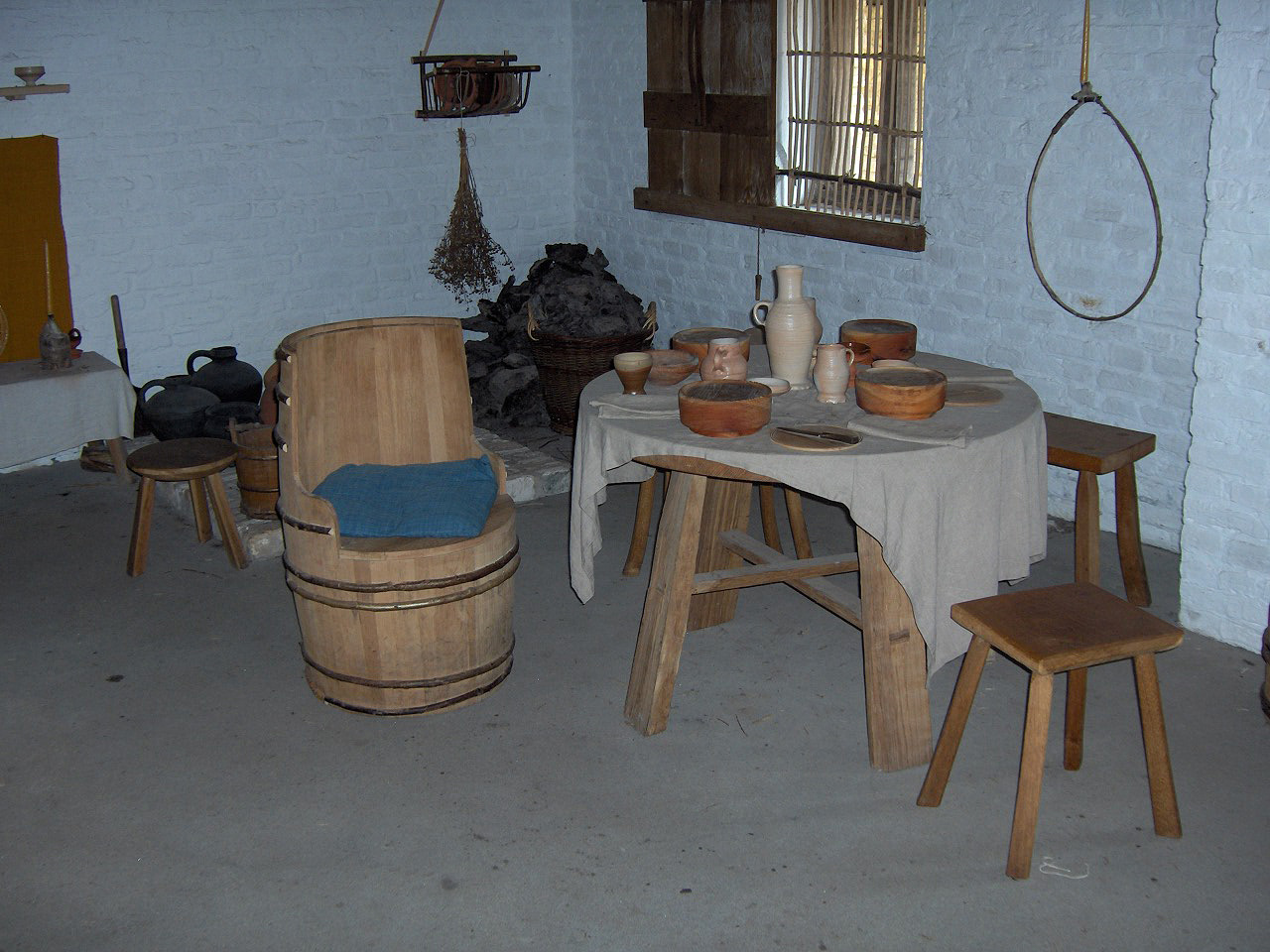
Restored table, barrel chair and stools

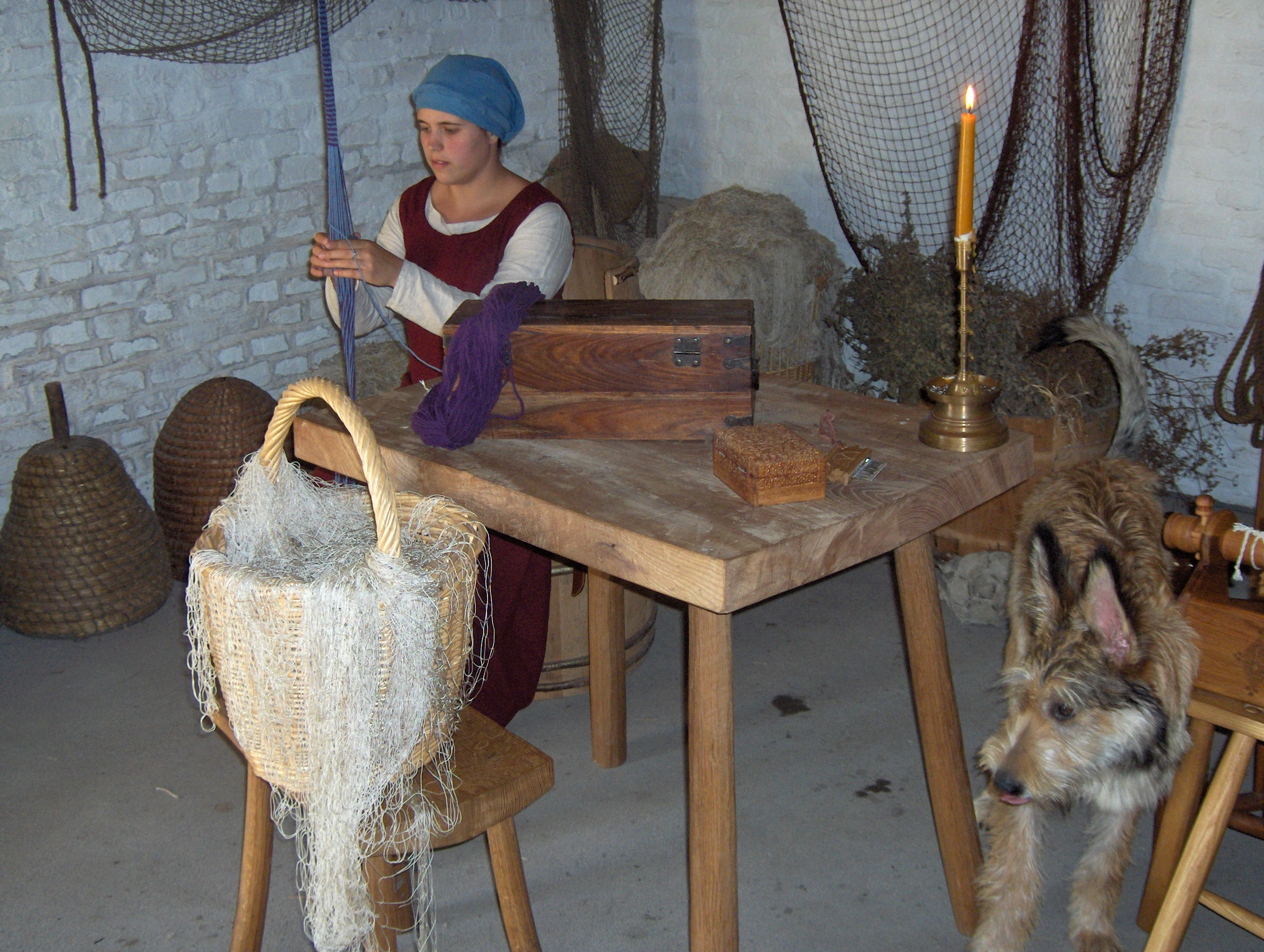
Woman in common fifteenth century dress repairing fishing net

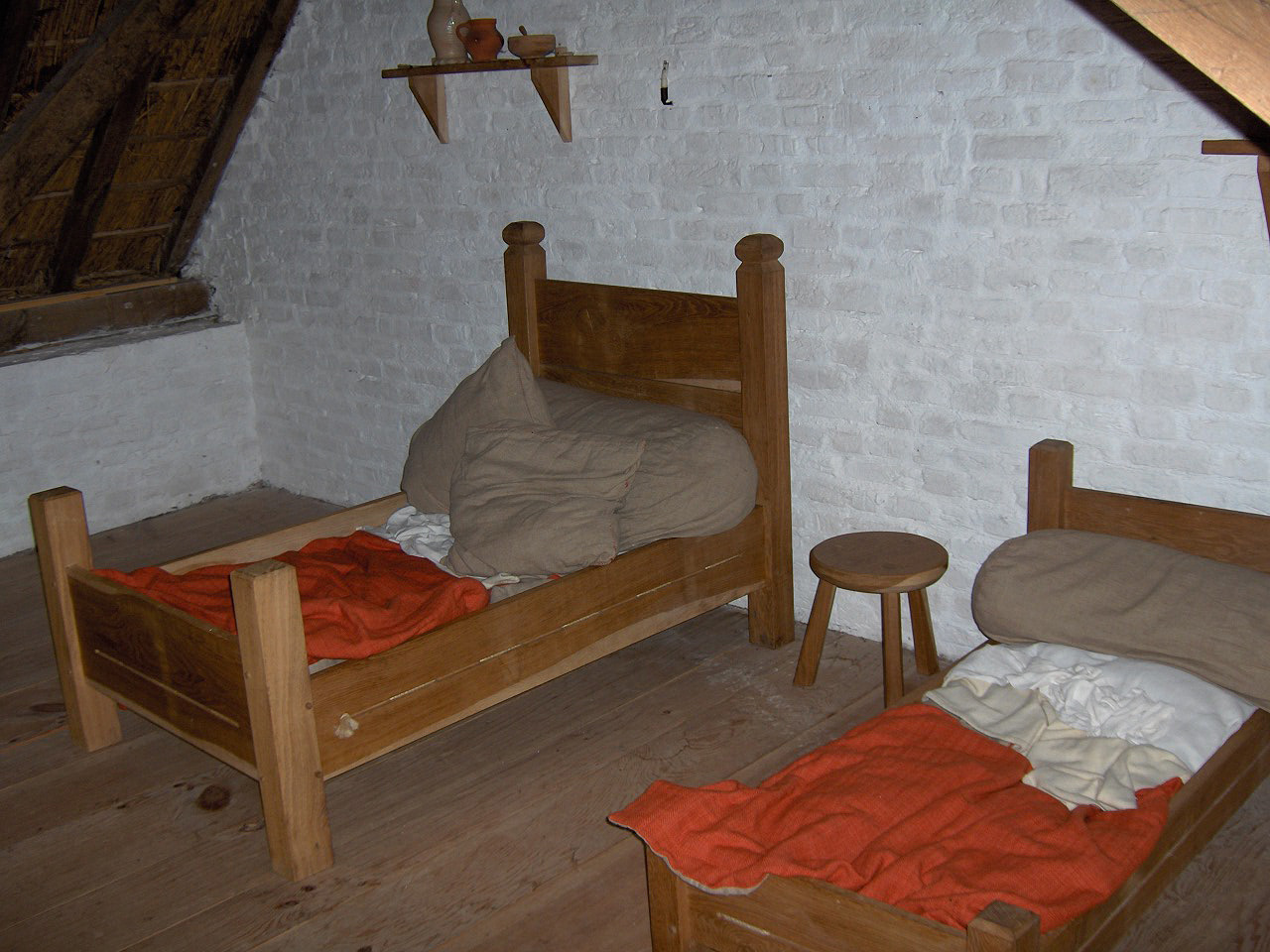
Children's bedroom with large pillows and the blankets coloured with madder

== Decline ==
Towards the end of the fifteenth century, the region became politically unstable. Starting in 1483, Maximilian of Austria warred against a coalition of Bruges and Ghent for ten years. Walraversijde was in the middle of these battles and was probably deserted during this time. The houses in the eastern quarter of the village were ruined and subsequently abandoned. To make matters worse, the fishing fleet became endangered at sea. Different parties in the English Channel and the North Sea became threatening in various ways, and the fisherman had to arrange for armed ships to protect their fleet. Meanwhile, the sand dunes started drifting again, and the village brewery closed.

But this was just a start. In 1568 the Eighty Years' War began, the Sea Beggars blockaded coastal ports while mercenaries plundered and looted the coast itself. In 1571 the dikes that surrounded Ostend were breached in a desperate attempt to defend the town. For eleven further years the region, including Walraversijde, was flooded and uninhabitable. Beyond this, the war still carried on, further destroying the area. By 1598, written sources recount how wasted the area had become, including Walraversijde. The finishing touch was the Siege of Ostend (1601–1604), after which, apart from some isolated houses, the fishing community of Walraversijde ceased to exist. The tower of the chapel remained until the nineteenth century when it collapsed in a storm.

== Walraversijde Museum ==
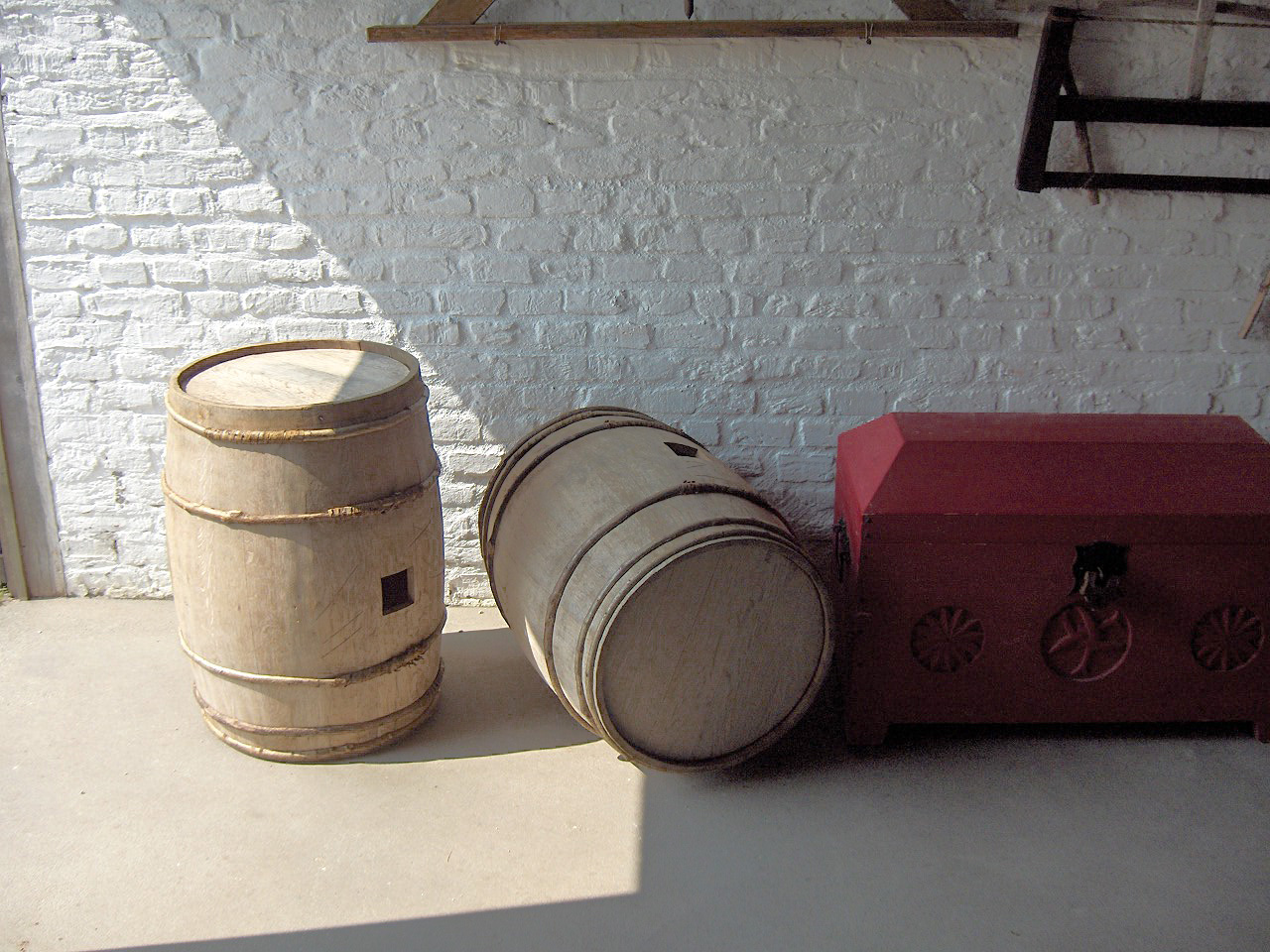
Barrels for salted herring

Because of the archaeological richness of the findings, the Province of West Flanders decided to present the results in an on-site interactive museum, Walraversijde Museum. The museum opened in 2000 and includes three medieval houses and a bakery/smokehouse. These late medieval buildings have been reconstructed as they are thought to have appeared during the prime of Walraversijde around 1465, together with furniture, fittings, and fixtures. Flemish artists were particularly productive during the 15th century, and their paintings have been helpful guides during reconstruction.

The museum displays artifacts which give a sense of the medieval fishing industry and trade, as well as the risks the fishermen faced at sea, such as piracy, war, and shipwrecks. There are further displays concerning household goods, clothing, hygiene, religious and recreational life, mouth bows and staffs, toys for young and old, including a well-engineered pair of bone glasses. Walraversijde has been studied more thoroughly and systematically than any other medieval fishermen community in Europe. This is, in part, because most other locations are still inhabited.

== Gallery ==
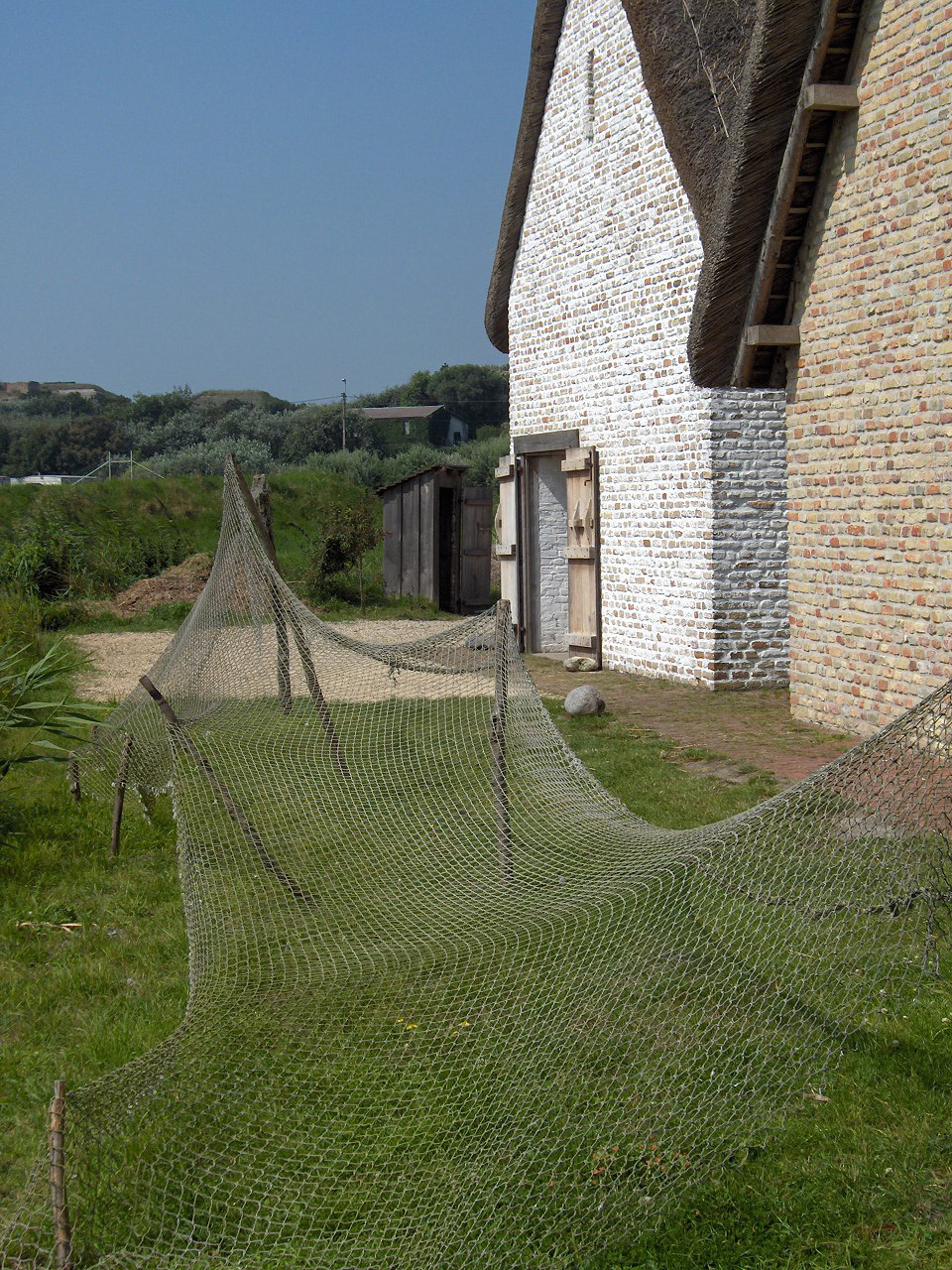
Fishing net drying on poles (reconstruction)

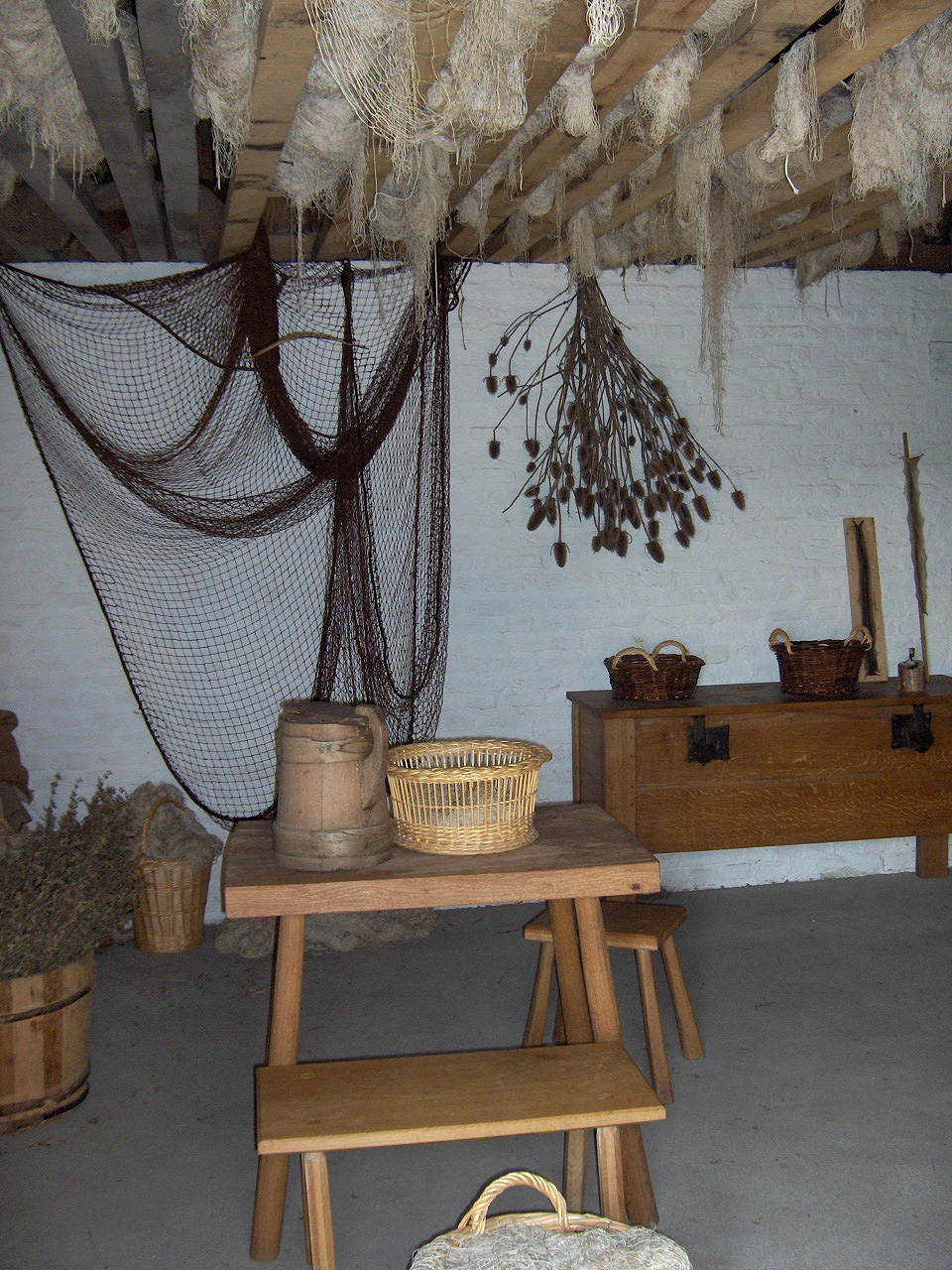
Nets, furniture, pitcher

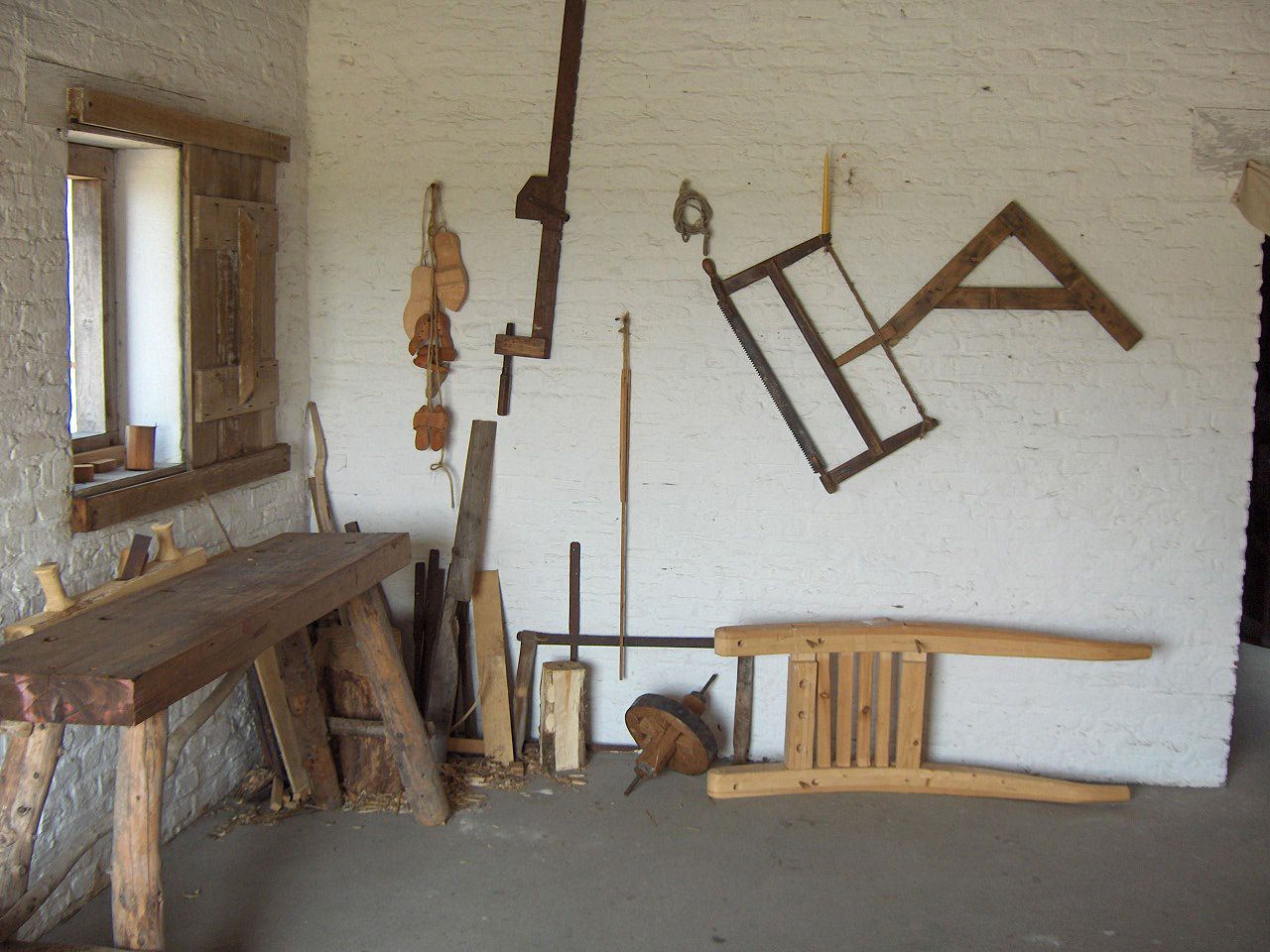
Tools of a medieval carpenter

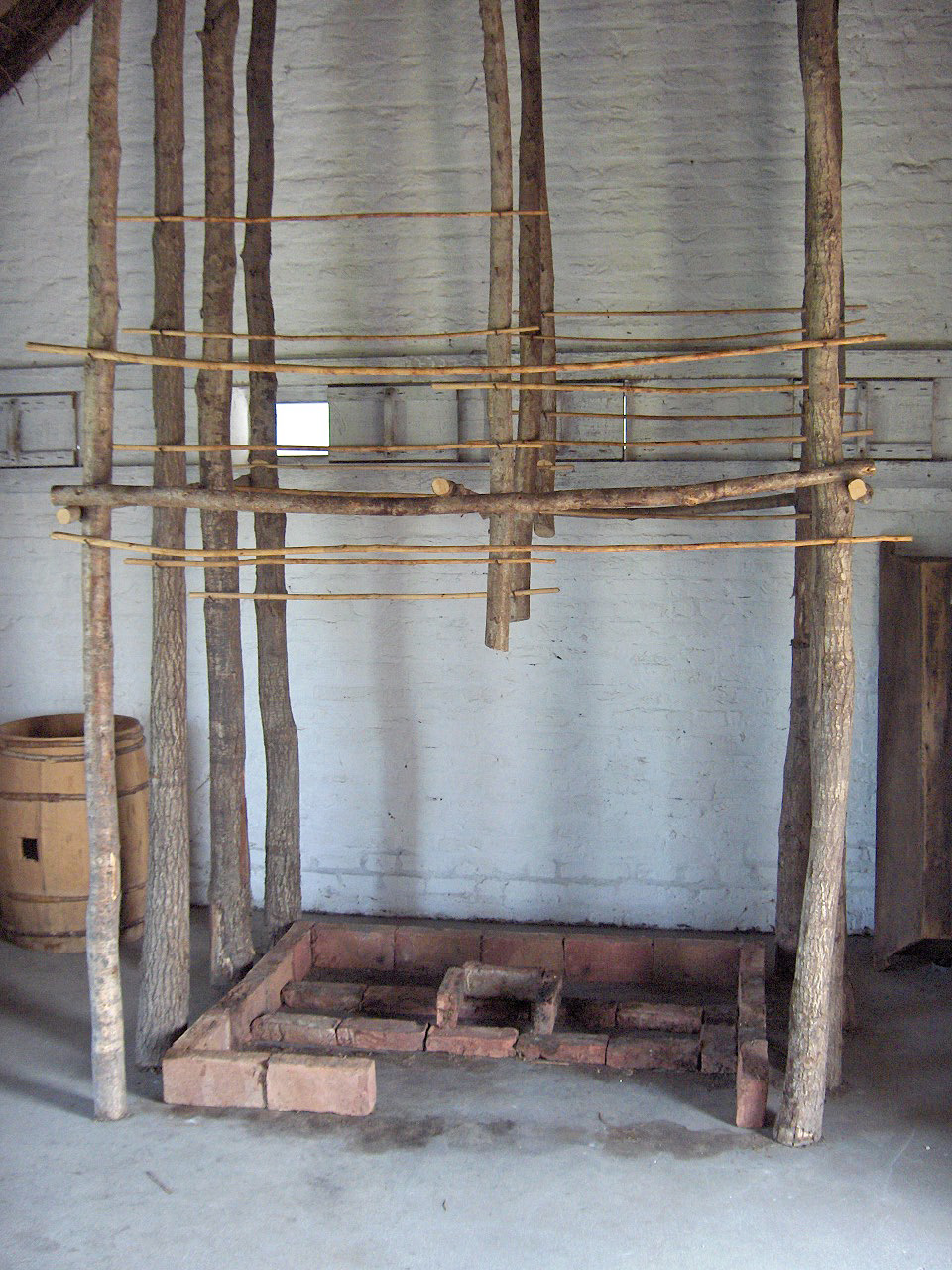
Fish smokery; frames to preserve fish during transport

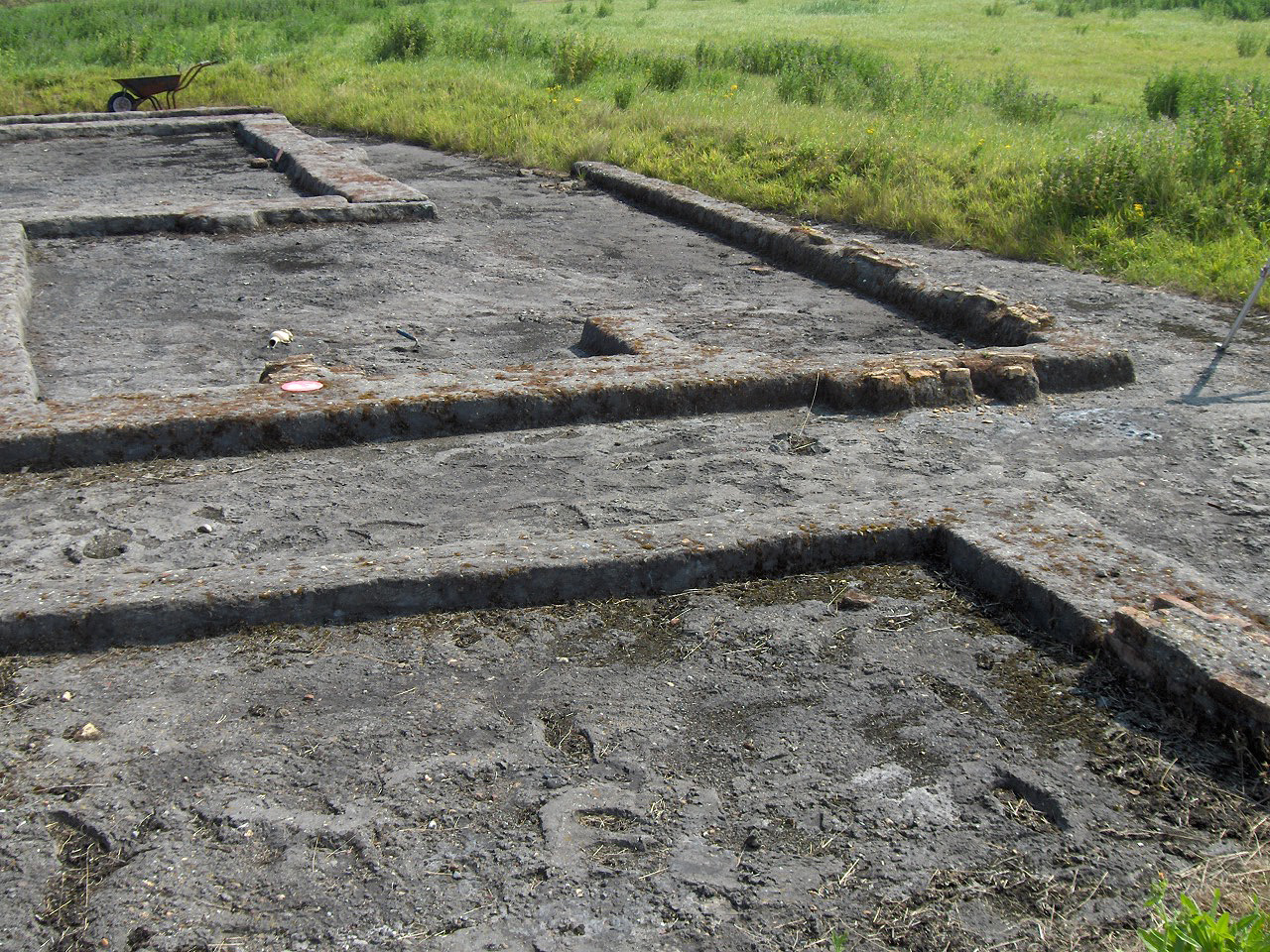
Foundations of fishermen's houses
