= Lehyam =

Traditional Indian medicine

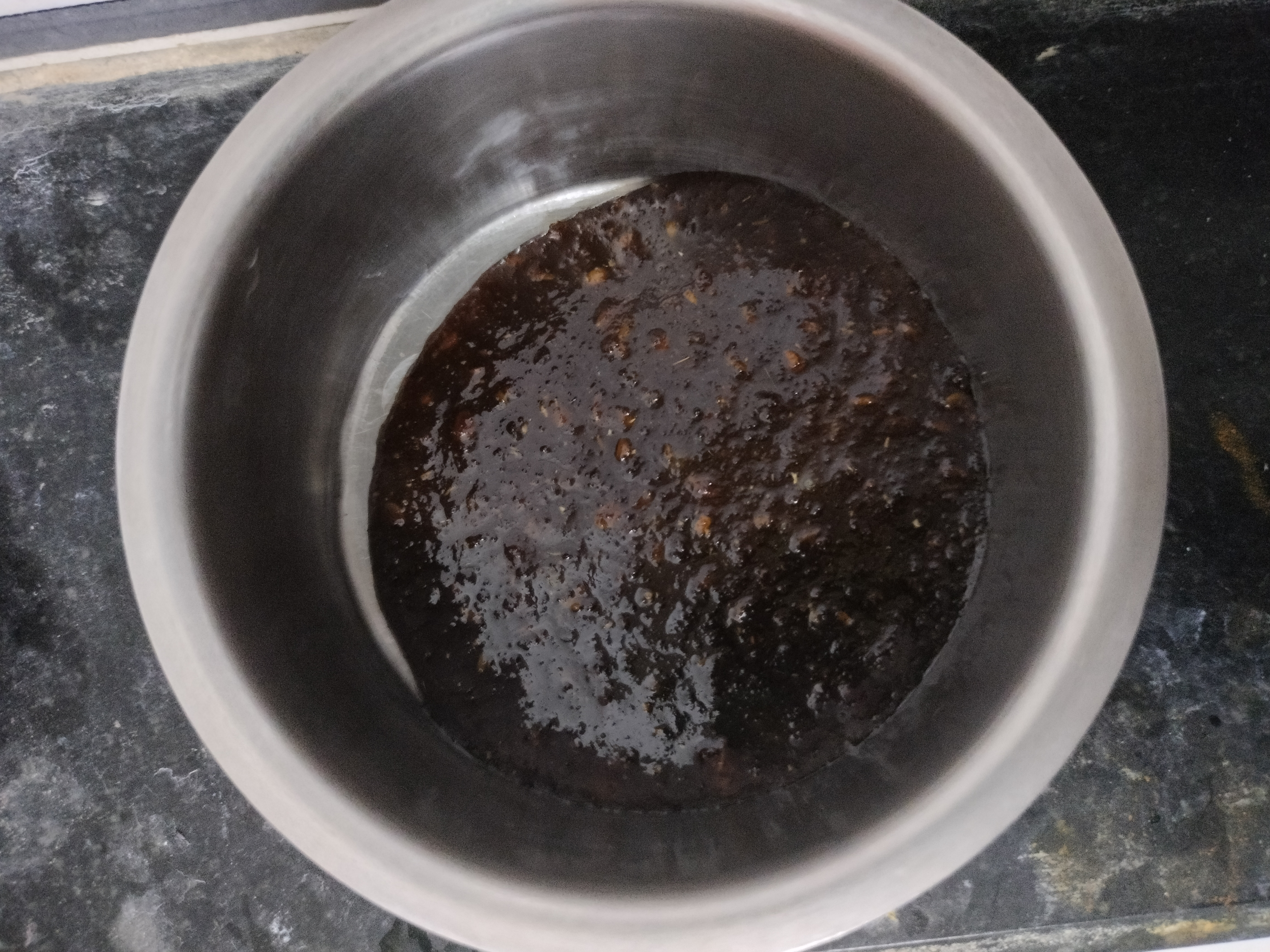
A small quantity of lekiyam served in a bowl

Lehyam (Sanskrit: लेह्य, romanized: Lēhya, lit. 'food to be licked'), also referred to as Lekiyam (Tamil: லேகியம், romanized: Lēkiyam) refers to a traditional Indian electuary or confection.

== Classification ==
Classified as a product of Siddha medicine, lehyam is regarded to be a healthy body tonic, consumed to resolve digestive and respiratory problems, comprising ingredients that are easily absorbed by the body.

== Ingredients and preparation ==
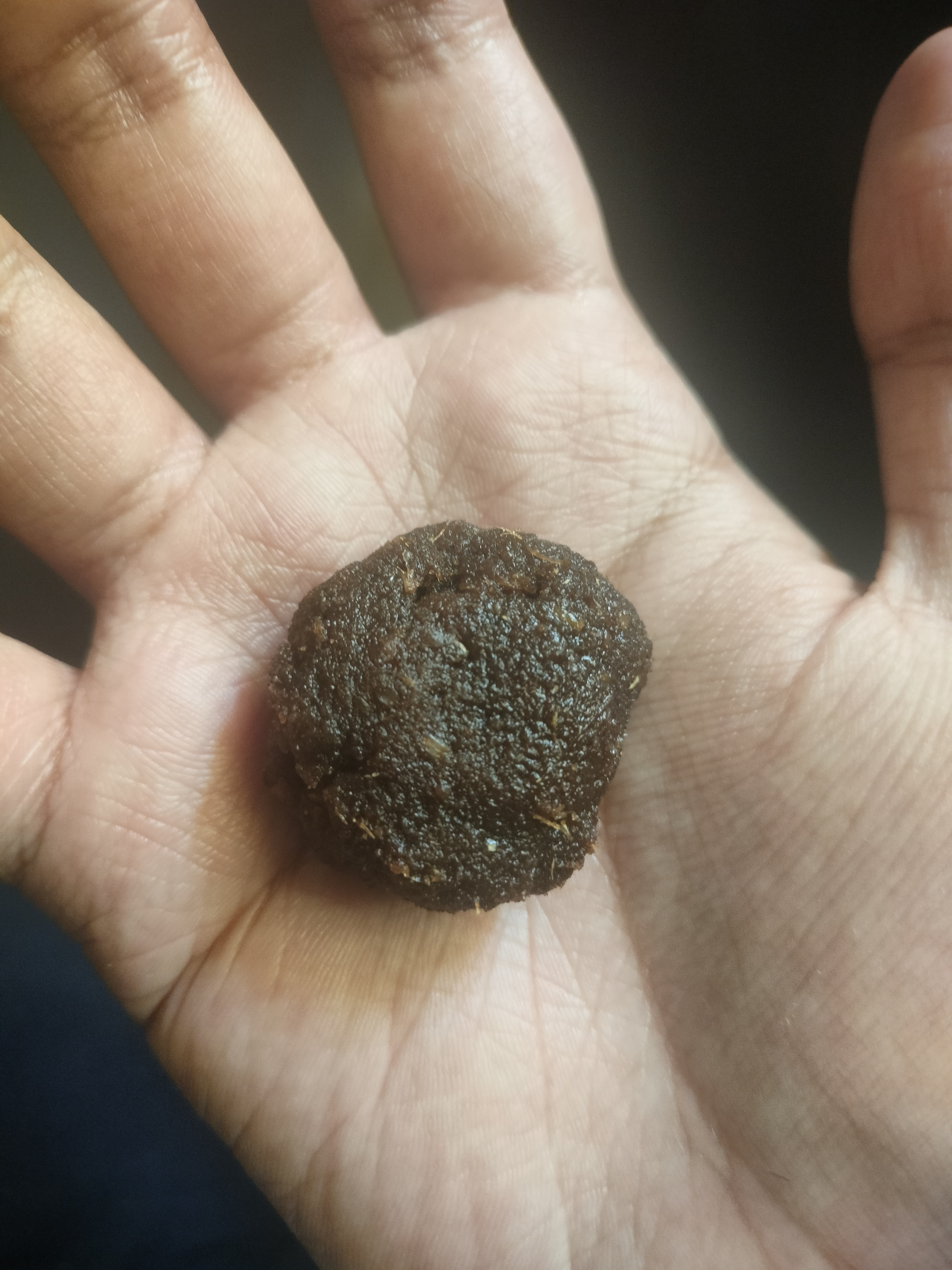
A ball of inji (ginger) lehyam upon a palm

Lehyam is prepared using powdered medicine, jaggery, sugar, honey, in an aqueous medium of water. Ghee is often added as a preserving agent, and after preparation, the food may be rolled into small balls and left to harden within a vessel, edible for up to a year.

== Variations and uses ==
Various forms of lehyam exist, and are named for their ingredients, and offer different properties. For instance, in Tamil Nadu, inji lekiyam, for which the salient ingredient is ginger, is offered to a new mother shortly after her delivery. Taneervittan (type of asparagus called shatavari) lekiyam and saubhagyasundi (dry ginger powder) lekiyam are used similarly. Nellikai lekiyam, for which the salient ingredient is star gooseberry, is offered to children to boost their immunity.

In South India, lehyam is often prepared and purchased on the occasion of Deepavali to aid the digestion, and counteract the effects, of eating sweets during the festival. According to The Hindu, Deepavali lekiyam, or Deepavali marundu, is popular in Chennai, and made in many households at festival time.

Ciṭṭukkuruvi lēkiyam, prepared from sparrow meat, was once consumed for aphrodisiacal purposes.

== See also ==
- Traditional medicine of India
