= Diasenna =

In pre-modern medicine, diasenna (medical Lat dia-, "composed of" + senna, from Arab. sanā) is a soft, purgative electuary containing the plant senna. The other ingredients are sugar candy, cinnamon, lapis lazuli, silk, cloves, galanga minor, black pepper, nardus indicus, seed of the basilica, leaves of cloves, cardamomum, saffron, ginger, zedoary, rosemary flowers, long pepper, lapis armenius, and honey. Diasenna was said to ease and comfort the melancholic, and splenetic, and was good against all diseases arising from an atrabilis.
