= Galingale =

Galingale may refer to:

- Galangal, one of several plants in the ginger family with aromatic rhizomes used for food and medicines
- Galingale, any of several species of Cyperus sedges with aromatic rhizomes, especially:
  - Cyperus longus
