= Bibliotheca =

Bibliotheca may refer to:

- Bibliotheca (Apollodorus), a grand summary of traditional Greek mythology and heroic legends
- Bibliotheca historica, a first century BC work of universal history by Diodorus Siculus
- Bibliotheca (Photius), a 9th-century work of Byzantine Patriarch Photius
- Bibliotheca (Bible), a 2014 version of the Bible without chapter and verse numbers

== See also ==
- Biblioteca Nacional (disambiguation)
- Library
