= List of Macedoniarchs =

This is a list of all the known Macedoniarchs, an official that was the head of the Koinon of Macedonians. It is known that there were only 11 such officials.

== List ==
- Claudius Rufrius Meno
- Septimus Insteianus Alexandros
- Silvanus Celer
- Poplius Aelius Nicanor
- Valerius Philoxenos
