= ALV =

ALV or Alv may refer to:

- Animal Liberation Victoria, the Australian animal rights organisation based in Melbourne
- Alvechurch railway station, Worcestershire, UK (National Rail code ALV)
- The Finnish value added tax
- Alv, a character in the 2002 anime Kiddy Grade
- American Literary Version
- Avian leukosis virus
- Autoliv (ticker symbol)
