= The Books of the Bible (book) =

Bible with chapter and verse numbers removed

Cover page of The Books of the Bible (NIV, 2011 update)

The Books of the Bible is the first presentation of an unabridged committee translation of the Bible to remove chapter and verse numbers entirely and instead present the biblical books according to their natural literary structures. This edition of the Bible is also noteworthy for the way it recombines books that have traditionally been divided, and for the way it puts the biblical books in a different order.

The edition was first published by the International Bible Society (now Biblica) in 2007 in Today's New International Version (TNIV). It was re-released in September 2012 in the latest update to the New International Version (NIV).

== Features ==
=== Natural literary structure in place of chapters and verses ===
The traditional chapter divisions in the Bible were introduced around the year 1200 by Stephen Langton, later Archbishop of Canterbury, when he was at the University of Paris. The verse divisions were added by Robert Estienne, a French printer and scholar, in the mid-16th century.

Biblical and literary scholars have noted that chapter and verse numbering disguises the actual form of the biblical writings and interferes with the act of reading. Ernest Sutherland Bates wrote, "Certainly, no literary format was ever less conducive to pleasure or understanding than is the curious and complicated panoply in which the Scriptures have come down to us. None but a work of transcendent literary genius could have survived such a handicap at all." Richard Moulton noted, "We are all agreed to speak of the Bible as a supremely great literature. Yet, when we open our ordinary editions, we look in vain for the lyrics, epics, dramas, essays, sonnets, treatises, which make the other great literatures of the world; instead of these the eye catches nothing but a monotonous uniformity of numbered sentences." New Testament scholar Hermann von Soden urged publishers, "It is high time, in any editions that wish to facilitate rather than impede readers' understanding of the New Testament writings, for not only the verse divisions… but also the conventional chapter divisions to disappear completely from the text. Without giving any consideration to these divisions, the text must be printed in a way that will illustrate visually what units the authors themselves created within their works."

In response to these concerns, in several 20th-century versions of the Bible, including two major committee translations, the chapter and verse numbers were moved to the margins, but they remained the organizing feature of the text. In one individual translation and one abridgment the numbers were eliminated entirely, but in the former case the text was still divided into the traditional chapters and in the latter topical divisions were introduced.

The Books of the Bible, according to its Preface, uses characteristics such as "changes in topic, movement in place or time, or shifts from one kind of writing to another" to identify the natural literary divisions within biblical books. It also relies on the tendency of authors to repeat "particular phrases… each time they [make] the transition from one section to another." The placement of these phrases "reinforces a structure that can already be recognized implicitly from other characteristics." The Books of the Bible uses line spacing of different widths to mark off natural literary sections on various levels. (Note: The Twentieth Century New Testament, London, New York & Chicago: Horace Marshall & Son, Fleming H. Revell, 1901 used two blank lines for larger divisions within sections, and one blank line for smaller divisions. The New English Bible, New York: Oxford University Press, 1970 also used blank lines to mark divisions within labeled sections.) It still provides a chapter and verse range, in faded type, at the bottom of each page.

=== Divided books recombined ===
The biblical book of Samuel-Kings was divided into two parts in the original Hebrew so it would fit conveniently onto ancient scrolls. When it was translated into Greek it expanded by a third (because Greek writing uses more letters per word in average than Hebrew writing), and so each part was divided in half, producing the books known today as 1 Samuel and 2 Samuel and 1 Kings and 2 Kings. (In the Septuagint the entire work, even though divided into four parts, is considered the "Book of Reigns".) In The Books of the Bible the work is treated as "one long book" that "tells the story of the Israelite monarchy from beginning to end." It is organized by "a consistent structuring pattern," a series of notices about kings' reigns, that "runs through the whole book".

Chronicles-Ezra-Nehemiah is another long biblical work that was divided into four parts in antiquity because of limitations on scroll length. The first two parts, 1 and 2 Chronicles, still make up a single book in the Hebrew Bible, as do the other two parts, Ezra and Nehemiah. G.F. Hasel writes, "It is rather widely accepted in current scholarship that Ezra-Nehemiah forms a continuation of Chronicles." The four books were presented together as "The Chronicles" in The Modern Reader's Bible, 1907. The Books of the Bible presents this work as "one long book, telling one continuous story."

Luke–Acts was also originally a single book. In The New Testament in Its Literary Environment, David Aune describes it as an example of the "general history" genre that "focused on the history of a particular people… from mythical beginnings to a point in the recent past." The book was divided into two parts not because of its length, but so that its first half, Luke, could be grouped with the other stories of Jesus' life (the gospels of Matthew, Mark, and John). The second half, Acts, is traditionally placed after the gospels, so that the book of John creates a barrier between the halves. The Books of the Bible reunites Luke and Acts and treats them as "two volumes of a single work." Luke-Acts was also presented as a single book in The Original New Testament (1985). In 2006 the International Bible Society published Luke-Acts as a separate volume in the format of The Books of the Bible under the title Kingdom Come, Kingdom Go.

=== A new book order ===
The accustomed order of the books of the Bible only became fixed in the mid–15th century with the advent of printing. Before that, the books were presented or listed in a variety of orders. In the case of the First Testament or Old Testament, Roger Beckwith explains that "this stability of order is a relatively modern phenomenon, and owes a good deal to the invention of printing. It was preceded by an era of fluidity, both among the Jews (the chief guardians of the Hebrew Bible) and among Christians (the chief guardians of the Greek [Bible])." In the case of the New Testament, Bruce M. Metzger notes similarly that beyond today's familiar order, "Prior to the invention of printing… there were many other sequences, not only of the five main groups of books [gospels, Acts, Pauline epistles, general epistles, Revelation], but also of the several books within each group. …Such matters were of no great significance for the ancient and medieval Church; they became an issue only with later editors and publishers." The order of the biblical books still differs between some ecclesiastical traditions today.

Some earlier editions of the Bible also presented the books in non-traditional orders: The Modern Readers' Bible; The Bible Designed to Be Read as Living Literature; The Twentieth Century New Testament; and The Original New Testament.

The Books of the Bible, again according to its Preface, seeks to "order the books in such a way that their literary types, the historical circumstances in which they were composed and the theological traditions out of which they speak will be evident." This new order is introduced because "the order in which today's readers are used to encountering the books of the Bible is yet another factor that hinders their understanding."

The book order in The Books of the Bible, and the rationale for it, is as follows:

==== First Testament ====
The Covenant History (Note: This division in The Books of the Bible includes the sections known as the Torah and the Former Prophets in the Hebrew Bible.)

"The first quarter of the Bible unfolds as one continuous narrative."

- Genesis
- Exodus
- Leviticus
- Numbers
- Deuteronomy
- Joshua
- Judges
- Ruth
- Samuel–Kings

The Prophets (Note: These books are known collectively as the Latter Prophets in the Hebrew Bible.)

The prophets are presented in "what… is plausibly their historical order."

- Jonah
- Amos
- Hosea
- Micah
- Isaiah
- Zephaniah
- Nahum
- Habakkuk
- Jeremiah
- Obadiah
- Ezekiel
- Haggai
- Zechariah
- Joel
- Malachi

The Writings

"The Writings… represent a much looser grouping… They have been drawn together from a wider range of traditions, genres… and time periods." They are "grouped by genre, so that each can be read meaningfully alongside other examples of the same kind of literature."

- Psalms
- Lamentations
- Song of Songs
- Proverbs
- Ecclesiastes
- Job
- Chronicles–Ezra–Nehemiah
- Esther
- Daniel

==== New Testament ====
"The order of the New Testament books in this edition seeks to express the ancient concept of the fourfold gospel in a fresh way. The traditional priority of the stories of Jesus is retained, but now each gospel is placed at the beginning of a group of related books."

Luke-Acts and the Pauline epistles

- Luke-Acts
- 1 Thessalonians
- 2 Thessalonians
- 1 Corinthians
- 2 Corinthians
- Galatians
- Romans
- Colossians
- Ephesians
- Philemon
- Philippians
- 1 Timothy
- Titus
- 2 Timothy

Matthew and works addressed to Jewish believers in Jesus

- Matthew
- Hebrews
- James

Mark and works addressed to a Roman audience

- Mark
- 1 Peter
- 2 Peter
- Jude

John and the letters of John

- John
- 1 John
- 2 John
- 3 John
- Revelation

(Revelation stands somewhat by itself because of its unique perspective and literary form, but its placement here also acknowledges its customary association with Johannine literature.)

=== Other features ===
The Books of the Bible also removes the NIV section headings and places the translators' notes at the end of each book. It presents the text in a single column. These changes, along with the removal of chapter and verse numbers and the recombination of divided works, are designed to "encourage meaningful units to be read in their entirety and so with greater appreciation and understanding."

== Development of The Books of the Bible ==
The format for The Books of the Bible was developed from 2003 to 2007 under the direction of Glenn Paauw, Director of Product Development at the International Bible Society (now Biblica). Editors who worked on the volume included Lisa Anderson, Paul Berry, John Dunham, Jim Rottenborn and Micah Wierenga. The graphic designer was Kate Hoyman. Consultants to the project included John R. Kohlenberger III, a master Bible typesetter and author and editor of Bible reference works; Dr. Eugene Rubingh, retired vice president for translation at the International Bible Society; and the Rev. Dr. Christopher R. Smith, a pastor, author, and scholar of biblical literature.

Bibles and Scripture portions published by the International Bible Society and Biblica in this format include:
Today's New International Version
The Search (Ecclesiastes) 2005
The Journey (Gospel of John) 2005
The Book of Psalms 2006
Kingdom Come, Kingdom Go (Luke-Acts) 2006
Amos: Hear This Word 2007
The Books of The Bible 2007
The Books of The Bible New Testament 2009, 2010
New International Version
The Books of the Bible New Testament 2011
The Books of the Bible Covenant History (Genesis-Kings) 2012
The Books of the Bible 2012

The Books of the Bible has become the centerpiece of Biblica's program of Community Bible Experiences, in which churches or similar groups read through a quarter of the Bible together in six to eight weeks.

InterVarsity Press is developing a series of study guides, entitled Understanding the Books of the Bible, that do not use chapters and verses and are instead keyed to the natural literary format of The Books of the Bible.

Biblica is developing a Spanish-language version of The Books of the Bible using the Nueva Versión Internacional entitled Los Libros de la Biblia.

Zondervan is planning to release a trade edition of The Books of the Bible in the fall of 2012.

== Responses to the edition ==
In its 2007 "Bible and Bible Reference Survey," Preaching.com called The Books of The Bible "one of the most interesting [Bibles published] this year," and predicted that the format changes would "aid reading and seeing the more natural divisions in the text which are often obscured by the chapter and verse divisions." A review in the journal Themelios stated, "The way [this edition] presents the Bible as a library of literature is unique, simple, and elegant"; the reviewer anticipated that "some other translations" might "follow suit." Bible Design and Binding described the edition as "a new approach both to the design and organization of the biblical text" that would "serve as an example to others." One of the contributors to the Better Bibles Blog expected that "the new format will bring increased understanding" and noted that "the format can be used with any version of the Bible."
