= Chapters and verses of the Bible =

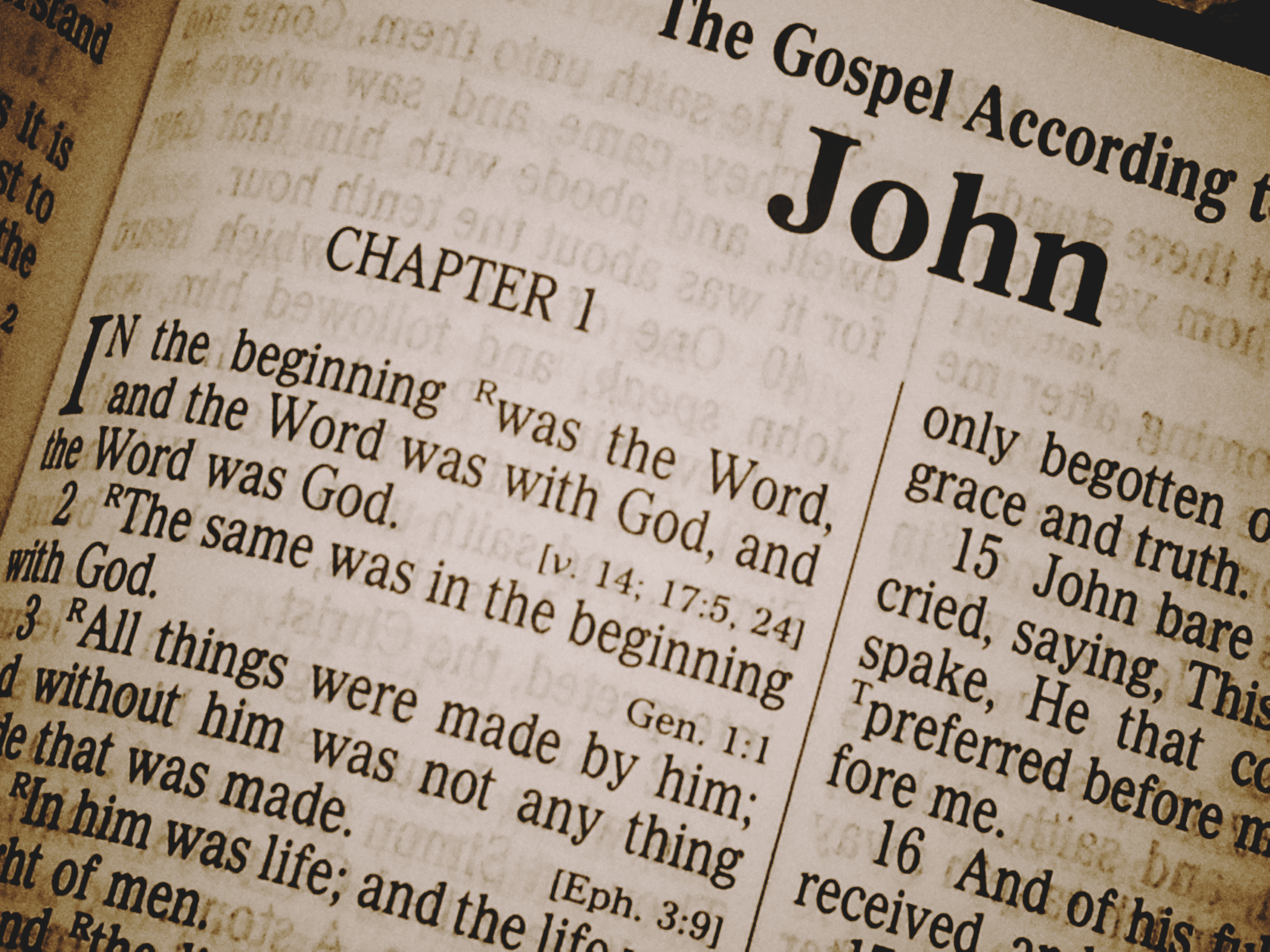
The Gospel according to John – a text showing chapter and verse divisions (King James Version)

The original Jewish and Christian Bibles did not have chapter and verse divisions—such divisions forming part of the paratext of the Bible. Since the early 13th century, most copies and editions of the Bible have presented all but the shortest of the scriptural books with divisions into chapters, generally a page or so in length. Since the mid-16th century, editors have further subdivided each chapter into verses – each consisting of a few short lines or of one or more sentences. Sometimes a sentence spans more than one verse, as in the case of Ephesians 2:8–9, and sometimes there is more than one sentence in a single verse, as in the case of Genesis 1:2. The Jewish divisions of the Hebrew text differ at various points from those used by Christians. For instance, Jewish tradition regards the ascriptions of many Psalms as independent verses or as parts of the subsequent verses, whereas established Christian practice treats each Psalm ascription as independent and unnumbered, resulting in 116 more verses in Jewish versions than in the Christian texts. Some chapter divisions also occur in different places, e.g. Hebrew Bibles have 1 Chronicles 5:27–41 where Christian translations have 1 Chronicles 6:1–15.

== History ==
=== Chapters ===
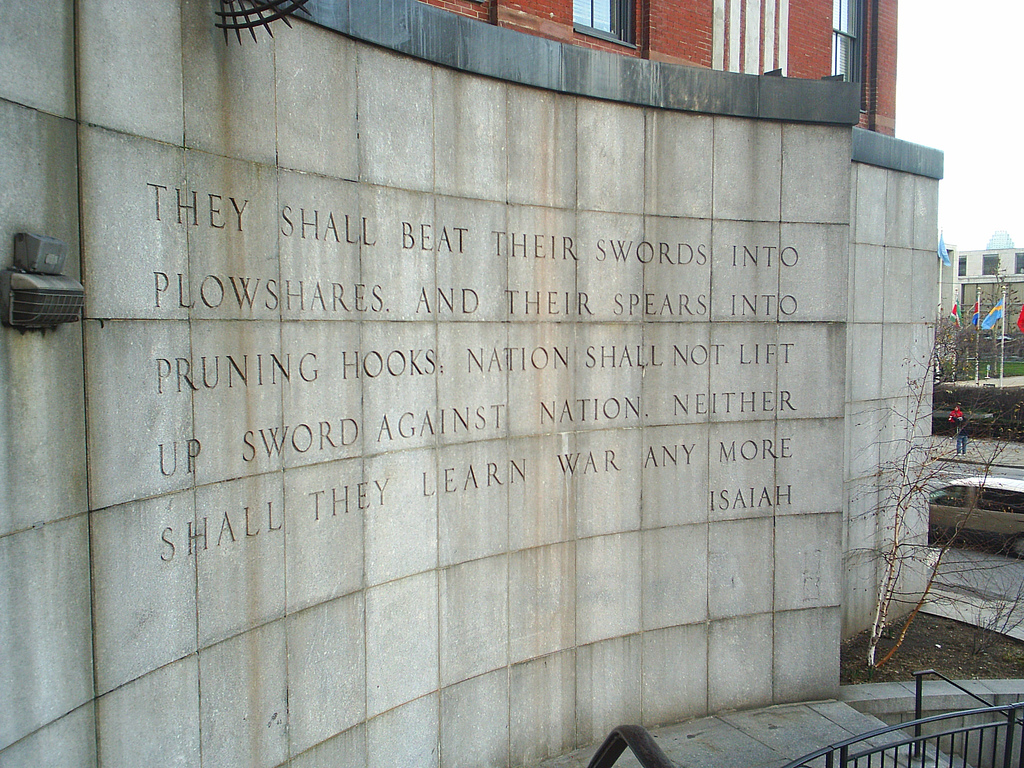
"...they shall beat their swords into plowshares, and their spears into pruning hooks: Nation shall not lift up sword against nation, neither shall they learn war any more." —Isaiah 2:4 (KJV), inscribed in a wall across the street from the Headquarters of the United Nations in New York City

Early manuscripts of the biblical texts did not contain the chapter and verse divisions in the numbered form familiar to modern readers. In antiquity Hebrew texts were divided into paragraphs (parashot) that were identified by two letters of the Hebrew alphabet. Peh (פ) indicated an "open" paragraph that began on a new line, while samekh (ס) indicated a "closed" paragraph that began on the same line after a small space. These two letters begin the Hebrew words open (patuach) and closed (satum), and are, themselves, open in shape (פ) and closed (ס). The earliest known witnesses of the Book of Isaiah from the Dead Sea Scrolls used parashot divisions, which differ slightly from the Masoretic divisions.

The Hebrew Bible was also divided into some larger sections. In Israel, the Torah (its first five books) were divided into 154 sections so that they could be read through aloud in weekly worship over the course of three years. In Babylonia, it was divided into 53 or 54 sections (Parashat ha-Shavua) so it could be read through in one year. The New Testament was divided into topical sections known as kephalaia ('chapters, divisions') by the fourth century. Eusebius of Caesarea divided the gospels into parts that he listed in tables or canons (Greek: κανών, kanōn). Neither of these systems corresponds with modern chapter divisions. (See fuller discussions below.)

Chapter divisions, with titles, are also found in the 9th-century Tours manuscript Paris Bibliothèque Nationale MS Lat. 3, the so-called Bible of Rorigo.

Cardinal archbishop Stephen Langton and Cardinal Hugo de Sancto Caro developed different schemas for systematic division of the Bible in the early 13th century. It is the system of Archbishop Langton on which the modern chapter divisions are based.

While chapter divisions have become nearly universal, editions of the Bible have sometimes been published without them. Such editions, which typically use thematic or literary criteria to divide the biblical books instead, include John Locke's Paraphrase and Notes on the Epistles of St. Paul (1707), Alexander Campbell's The Sacred Writings (1826), Daniel Berkeley Updike's fourteen-volume The Holy Bible Containing the Old and New Testaments and the Apocrypha, Richard Moulton's The Modern Reader's Bible (1907), Ernest Sutherland Bates's The Bible Designed to Be Read as Living Literature (1936), The Books of the Bible (2007) from the International Bible Society (Biblica), Adam Lewis Greene's five-volume Bibliotheca (2014), and the ESV Reader's Bible (2016) from Crossway Books.

=== Verses ===
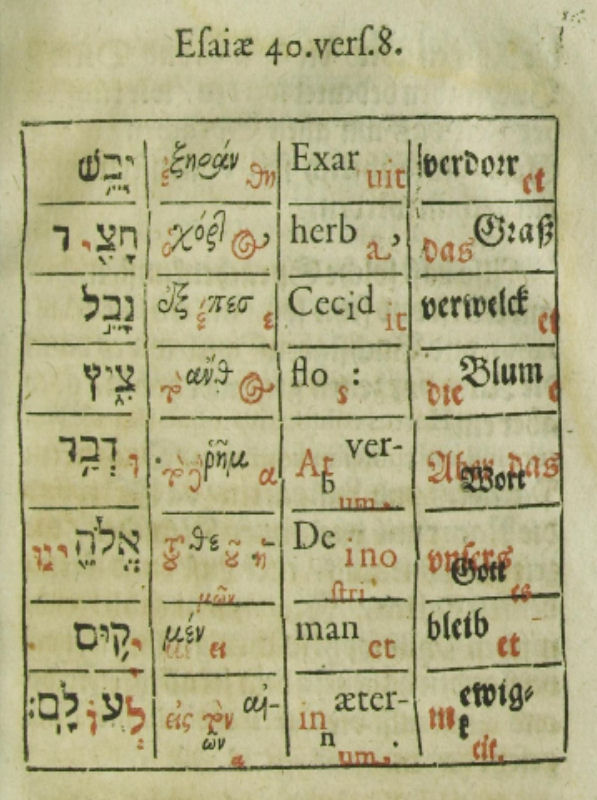
Isaiah chapter 40, verse 8 in Hebrew, Greek, Latin, and German, with the verse analysed word-by-word. In English, this verse is translated "The grass withers and the flowers fall, but the word of our God endures forever." (from Elias Hutter, 1602)

Since at least 916 the Tanakh has contained an extensive system of multiple levels of section, paragraph, and phrasal divisions that were indicated in Masoretic vocalization and cantillation markings. One of the most frequent of these was a special type of punctuation, the sof passuq, symbol for a period or sentence break, resembling the colon (:) of English and Latin orthography. With the advent of the printing press and the translation of the Hebrew Bible into English, versifications were made that correspond predominantly with the existing Hebrew sentence breaks, with a few isolated exceptions. Most attribute these to Rabbi Isaac Nathan ben Kalonymus's work for the first Hebrew Bible concordance around 1440.

The first person to divide New Testament chapters into verses was the Italian Dominican biblical scholar Santes Pagnino (1470–1541), but his system was never widely adopted. His verse divisions in the New Testament were far longer than those known today. The Parisian printer Robert Estienne created another numbering in his 1551 edition of the Greek New Testament, which was also used in his 1553 publication of the Bible in French. Estienne's system of division was widely adopted, and it is this system which is found in almost all modern Bibles. Estienne produced a 1555 Vulgate that is the first Bible to include the verse numbers integrated into the text. Before this work, they were printed in the margins.

The first English New Testament to use the verse divisions was a 1557 translation by William Whittingham (c. 1524–1579). The first Bible in English to use both chapters and verses was the Geneva Bible published shortly afterwards by Sir Rowland Hill in 1560. These verse divisions soon gained acceptance as a standard way to notate verses, and have since been used in nearly all English Bibles and the vast majority of those in other languages.

== Jewish tradition ==
The Masoretic Text of the Hebrew Bible notes several different kinds of subdivisions within the biblical books:

=== Pesukim ===
According to Talmudic tradition, the division of the text into pesukim (verses) is of ancient origin. In Masoretic versions of the Bible, the end of a verse, or sof passuk, is indicated by a small mark in its final word called a silluq (which means "stop"). Less formally, verse endings are usually also indicated by two vertical dots following the word with a silluq.

=== Parashot ===
The Masoretic Text also contains sections, or portions, called parashot or parashiyot. The end of a parashah is usually indicated by a space within a line (a "closed" section) or a new line beginning (an "open" section). The division of the text reflected in the parashot is usually thematic. Unlike chapters, the parashot are not numbered, but some of them have special titles.

In early manuscripts (most importantly in Tiberian Masoretic manuscripts, such as the Aleppo Codex), an "open" section may also be represented by a blank line, and a "closed" section by a new line that is slightly indented (the preceding line may also not be full). These latter conventions are no longer used in Torah scrolls and printed Hebrew Bibles. In this system, the one rule differentiating "open" and "closed" sections is that "open" sections must always start at the beginning of a new line, while "closed" sections never start at the beginning of a new line.

=== Sedarim ===
Another division of the biblical books found in the Masoretic Text is the division into sedarim. For the Torah, this division reflects the triennial cycle of reading that was practiced by the Jews of the Land of Israel.

== Christian versions ==
Christians also introduced a concept roughly similar to chapter divisions, called kephalaia (singular kephalaion, literally meaning heading).

Cardinal Hugo de Sancto Caro is often given credit for first dividing the Latin Vulgate into chapters in the real sense, but it is the arrangement of his contemporary and fellow cardinal Stephen Langton who in 1205 created the chapter divisions which are used today. They were then inserted into Greek manuscripts of the New Testament in the 16th century. Robert Estienne (Robert Stephanus) was the first to number the verses within each chapter, his verse numbers entering printed editions in 1551 (New Testament) and 1553 (Hebrew Bible).

Several modern publications of the Bible have eliminated numbering of chapters and verses. Biblica published such a version of the NIV in 2007 and 2011. In 2014, Crossway published the ESV Reader's Bible and Bibliotheca published a modified ASV.

== See also ==
- Bible – Collection of religious texts
- Bible citation – Book name and chapter and verse of the Bible
- List of New Testament verses not included in modern English translations
- Parashah – Section of a biblical book in the Masoretic Text
- Surah – Chapter of the Quran
