= Authorship of Luke–Acts =

Authorship of Luke and Acts

The Gospel of Luke and the Acts of the Apostles make up a two-volume work called Luke–Acts. According to a Church tradition, he was the Luke named as a companion of Paul in the Pauline letters, though the author is not named in the work, and critical views at the end of the 20th century were evenly divided about whether Luke the physician wrote it. The composition of the combined work is dated to around 80–90 AD.

Many scholars believe Luke the Evangelist to be a Gentile Christian, though some scholars think Luke was a Hellenic Jew. The identification of Luke as a physician comes from Colossians 4:14 and 2 Timothy, whose authenticity is debated in scholarship. Much discussion concerns the "we" passages of the Acts of the Apostles, though there currently exists no scholarly consensus.

== Common authorship of Luke and Acts ==
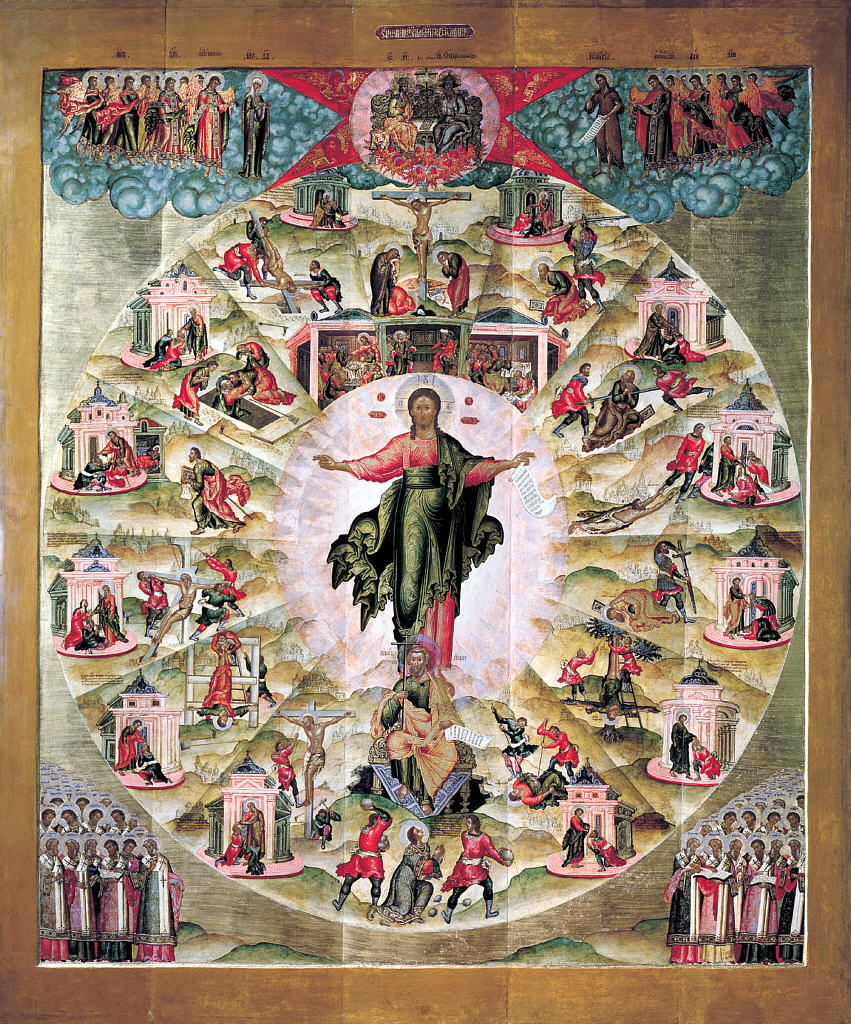
Ministry of the Apostles. Russian icon by Fyodor Zubov, 1660.

The Gospel of Luke and the Acts of the Apostles make up a two-part work, Luke–Acts, by the same author. Linguistic and theological similarities between the Gospel of Luke and the Book of Acts as well as the prefaces of Luke and Acts have led scholars to agree on their literary unity. The author is not named in either volume, as was common for ancient histories, such as Tacitus's Germania and Diogenes Laertius. According to a Church tradition, first attested by Irenaeus (c. 130 – c. 202 AD), he was the Luke named as a companion of Paul in the Pauline letters, but critical views at the end of the 20th century were evenly divided about whether Luke the physician wrote it, with a consensus noting the differences with the Pauline epistles, though recent scholarship tends to have a more favorable appraisal of Acts. The majority of scholars date the composition of the combined work to around 70-90 AD. The earliest surviving manuscripts for the Gospel of Luke fall into two "families" with considerable differences between them, the Western and the Alexandrian text-type, and the dominant view is that the Western text represents a process of deliberate revision in the second century, as the variations seem to form specific patterns.

The Gospel of Luke tells how God fulfilled his plan for the world's salvation through the life, death and resurrection of Jesus of Nazareth, the promised messiah. Acts continues the story of Christianity, beginning with the ascension of Jesus to Heaven. The early chapters, set in Jerusalem, describe the Day of Pentecost and the growth of the church in Jerusalem. Initially, the Jews are receptive to the Christian message, but later they turn against the followers of Jesus. Rejected by the Jews, the message is taken to the Gentiles under the guidance of Paul the Apostle. The later chapters tell of Paul's conversion, his mission in Asia Minor and the Aegean, and his imprisonment in Rome, where, as the book ends, he awaits trial.

Both books are addressed to Theophilus, the author's patron—and perhaps a label for a Christian community as a whole as the name means "Beloved of God", and the preface of Acts explicitly references "my former book" about the life of Jesus—almost certainly the work we know as the Gospel of Luke.

== Views on authorship ==
Although there currently exists no scholarly consensus on the authorship of Luke-Acts, three interpretations of the “we-passages” have become dominant: a) the writer was a genuine historical eyewitness, b) the writer was redacting existing written material or oral sources, whether by genuine eyewitnesses or not, c) use of the first person plural is a deliberate stylistic device which was common to the genre of the work, but which was not intended to indicate a historical eyewitness. Another possibility that goes beyond the theory of stylistic insertions is to propose that the "we" passages are deliberate deceptions, designed to convince readers that the author was a travelling companion of Paul, even though he was not.

=== Traditional view: Luke the physician as author ===
The traditional view is that the Gospel of Luke and Acts were written by the physician Luke, a companion of Paul. Many scholars believe him to be a Gentile Christian, though some scholars think Luke was a Hellenic Jew. This Luke is mentioned in Paul's Epistle to Philemon (v.24), and in two other epistles which are traditionally ascribed to Paul (Colossians 4:14 and 2 Timothy 4:11).

The view that Luke–Acts was written by the physician Luke was virtually unanimous in the early Christian church. The Papyrus Bodmer XIV, which is the oldest known manuscript containing the ending of the gospel (dating to around 200 AD), uses the subscription "The Gospel According to Luke". Nearly all ancient sources also shared this theory of authorship—Irenaeus, Tertullian, Clement of Alexandria, Origen, and the Muratorian Canon all regarded Luke as the author of Luke–Acts. Neither Eusebius of Caesarea nor any other ancient writer mentions another tradition about authorship.

In addition to the evidence provided by the ancient sources, the “we" passages passages (Acts 16:10–17; 20:5–15; 21:1–18; 27:1–37; 28:1-16)—a number of verses in Acts are written in the first person plural ("we") apparently indicating that the writer is participating in the events he is describing—were first interpreted by Irenaeus as evidence that the writer was a personal eyewitness of these events, and a companion of Paul on his travels; the traditional Luke. Although the bulk of Acts is written in the third person, several brief sections of the book are written from a first-person perspective. These "we" sections are written from the point of view of a traveling companion of Paul: e.g. "After Paul had seen the vision, we got ready at once to leave for Macedonia", "We put out to sea and sailed straight for Samothrace". Such passages would appear to have been written by someone who traveled with Paul during some portions of his ministry. This has been used as evidence to support the conclusion that these passages, and therefore the entire text of Luke–Acts, were written by a traveling companion of Paul's. The physician Luke would be one such person. This interpretation had come under sustained criticism by the middle of the twentieth century.

The interpretation of the "we" passages as indicative that the writer was a historical eyewitness (whether Luke the evangelist or not), remains the most influential in current biblical studies. Objections to this viewpoint mainly take the form of the following two interpretations, but also include the claim that Luke-Acts contains differences in theology and historical narrative which are irreconcilable with the authentic letters of Paul the Apostle.

The traditional view recognizes that Luke was not an eyewitness of the events in the Gospel, nor of the events prior to Paul's arrival in Troas in Acts 16:8, and the first "we" passage is Acts 16:10.

=== Redactor ===
The interpretation of the "we" passages as an earlier written source incorporated into Acts by a later redactor (whether Luke the evangelist or not), acknowledges the apparent historicity of these texts whilst viewing them as distinct from the main work. This view has been criticized for failing to provide sufficient evidence of a distinction between the source text and the document into which it was incorporated. ln 1882 Hobart claimed that the vocabulary used in Luke–Acts suggests its author may have had medical training, but this assertion was challenged by an influential study by Cadbury in 1926 that argued Luke's supposed medical terminology was no different than terminology used by non-physician authors such as Plutarch.

=== Critical view: Authentic letters of Paul do not refer to Luke as a physician ===
The Epistle to Philemon, almost universally accepted as an authentic letter of Paul, includes the name "Luke" among other "co-workers" of Paul who are sending greetings to the letter's recipients (Philemon, verse 24). The identification of Luke as a physician comes from Colossians 4:14. The historical Paul never mentions any "Luke the doctor", according to Bart Ehrman (since Colossians is not authentic). A 2011 survey of 109 scholars at the British New Testament Conference found 56 in favor of authenticity, while 17 rejected Pauline authorship and 36 were uncertain. 2 Timothy 4:11 also mentions a "Luke" and refers to him being "with me" but most modern scholars do not accept 2 Timothy as an authentic letter of Paul. Scholars use the word "Luke" wantonly.

=== Critical view: "We" passages as fragments of an earlier source ===
Vernon Robbins (1978) regards the "we" passages as a Greek rhetorical device used for sea voyages. However, scholars have criticized Robbins' literary-device theory by arguing that contemporary first-person accounts were the exception rather than the rule; that Robbins' cited literature is too broad in both linguistic range (Egyptian, Greek, and Latin) and temporal extent (1800 BC to third century AD); that many of the literary sea voyages cited represented the author's actual presence and were not literary devices at all; that many of his examples use the first person throughout and not only during sea voyages; and so on.

Noting the use of the "we" passages in the context of travel by ship, some scholars have viewed the "we" passages as a literary convention typical to shipboard voyages in travel romance literature of this period. This view has been criticized for failing to find appropriate parallels, and for failing to establish the existence of such a stylistic convention, and has not been widely accepted. Distinctive differences between Acts and the works of a fictional genre have also been noted, indicating that Acts does not belong to this genre.

=== Forgery ===
Some scholars suggest that the "we" passages are written by someone falsely claiming to have been a travelling companion of Paul, in order to present the untrue idea that the author had firsthand knowledge of Paul's views and activities, thus making the Acts of the Apostles a forgery. The author of Acts "wanted his readers to understand that he was for a time a traveling companion of Paul, even though he was not."

== Language ==
Scholars have characterised the language used by the author of Luke–Acts as 'a more polished Greek than Mark', saying it 'at times lacks Mark's Hebraisms (cf. Mk 11:9; 14:36) or uses Greek equivalents (Lk 3:12; 6:15; 23:33).' However, some typical Hebraic phrases such as 'and it came to pass' can still be commonly found in Luke–Acts, which may be based on Semitic sources; E. Earle Ellis (1999) cited as examples Luke 1:5–2:40; 5:1–11; 7:11–17, 36–50; 8:1–3; 9:51–56; 11:27f.; 13:10–17; 14:1–6; 17:11–19; 19:1–10; 23:50–24:53.

Some early scholars thought that the prevalence of Semitic idioms was much higher in the gospel and the first half of Acts than in the second half of Acts. They noted that the Acts narratives of the first half mostly took place inside the Levant while the narratives in the second half of Acts were mostly set in gentile environments outside the Levant. They also suggested that there was a link between the narratives' geography and the rate of Semitic idioms. This led Charles Cutler Torrey (1906) to hypothesise that Acts chapters 1–15 were translated from an Aramaic document, but most of Torrey's arguments were rejected by other scholars, who pointed out that many Semitisms existed in Acts 16–28 as well.

== See also ==
- The Lost Chapter of the Acts of the Apostles
- Historical reliability of the Acts of the Apostles
- Authorship of the Pauline epistles
