= Bibliotheca (Bible) =

2014 version of the Bible

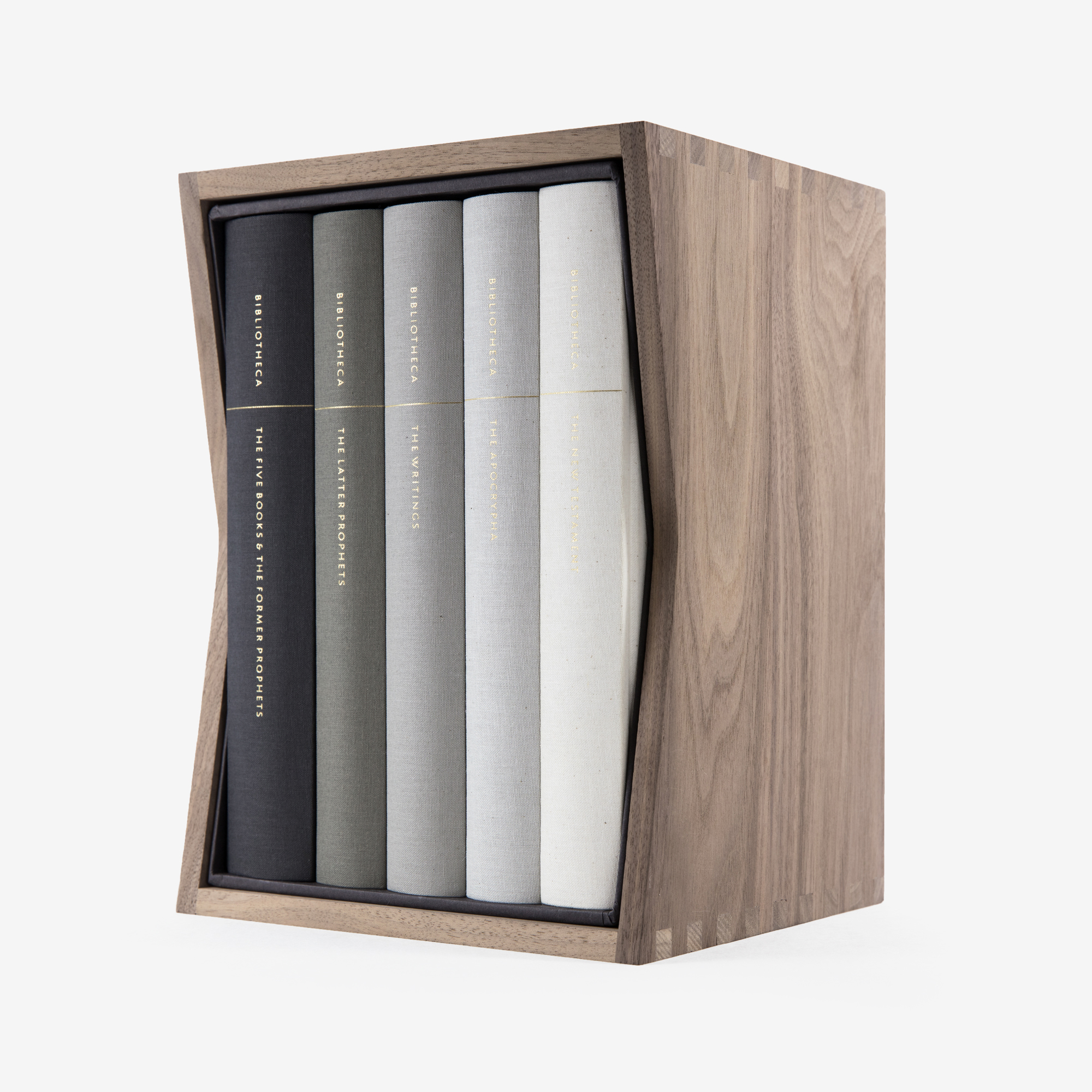
Bibliotheca, a five-volume reader's bible.

Bibliotheca is a five-volume version of the Bible created by Adam Lewis Greene and published in 2016. It was funded in mid-2014 through a thirty-day Kickstarter campaign for which Greene set a goal of $37,000, but the campaign raised over $1.4 million. Greene's aim, as detailed in his Kickstarter campaign video, was to enhance the experience of reading biblical literature by giving the content a more novel-like form, omitting chapter and verse numbers and annotations, utilizing a sewn binding and opaque book paper (rather than Bible paper), and creating original typefaces optimized for legibility, among other features.

== Translation ==
Bibliotheca features a translation referred to as the American Literary Version (ALV), a new recension of the American Standard Version (ASV). (The ASV was published in 1901 as a revision of the King James Version.)

The revisions in the ALV pertain mainly to the elimination of Jacobean grammar and vocabulary in the ASV (e.g., “thou” and “doth”), which had been retained from the KJV. After the text had been edited for style, Greene enlisted a group of seven biblical language experts from Oxford, Fuller, Wheaton, Emory, and other reputable institutions to review the text (among them were noted scholars Brent A. Strawn and David A. deSilva) and invited them to make suggestions in light of lexical developments since the publication of the ASV. A project update from Greene in April 2016, featuring a note from deSilva, implies that critical changes were indeed made to the text: “Without damaging the literary quality of the base translation,” writes deSilva, “we were able to suggest many changes that would bring the translation up to par with where textual criticism and Greek lexicography currently stand, not to mention alert Adam to a few all-out mistranslations of the original Hebrew and Greek in the ASV (every translation has them).”

== Miscellaneous ==
Because the text of Bibliotheca is spread across five volumes, it was possible to utilize a thicker, more opaque paper than the thinner, more translucent paper typical of most Bibles.

Bibliotheca has several features in common with The Books of the Bible (published by Biblica in 2007), which separates the text of the Bible into multiple volumes and omits chapter and verse numbers. The Books of the Bible does not include the Apocrypha and differs from Bibliotheca in several production features, including its use of thin Bible paper, a perfect binding (glued rather than sewn), narrower margins, longer lines of text, and more text per page.

After Greene's 2014 Kickstarter project, evangelical publisher Crossway worked on its own high-quality, multi-volume Bible set similar in style and concept to Bibliotheca, ultimately publishing the ESV Reader's Bible, Six-Volume Set on October 31, 2016, just weeks before Greene began shipping his final product. However, Crossway's product does not include the Apocrypha.
