= Gospel of Luke =

Book of the New Testament

- ← Gospel of Mark Gospel of John →
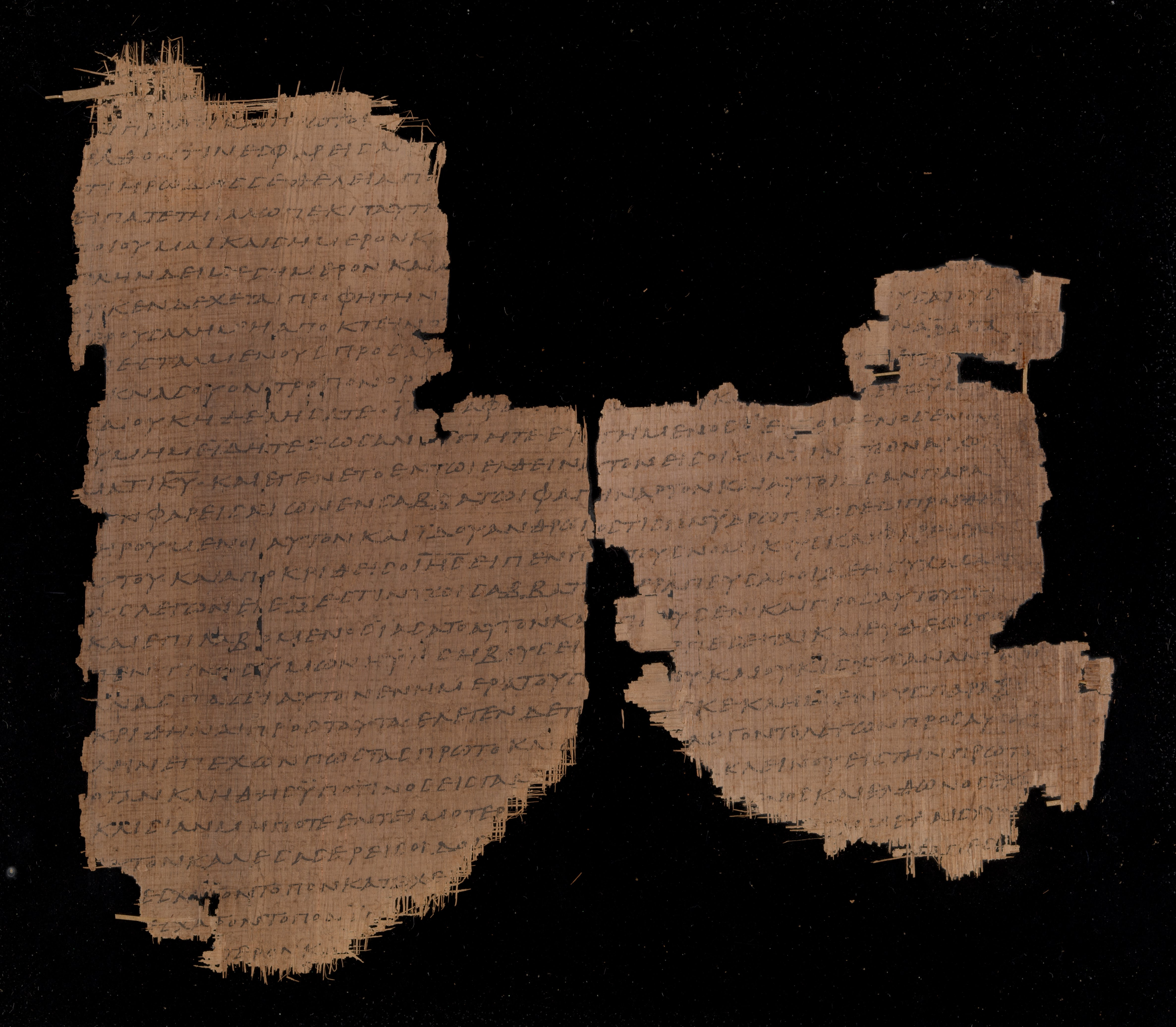
- Luke 13:29–14:10 on Papyrus 45 (recto; c. AD 250)

Information
- Religion: Christianity
- Author: Traditionally Luke the Evangelist
- Language: Koine Greek
- Period: c. 80–90 AD
- Chapters: 24
- Verses: 1,151

Full text
- Gospel of Luke at Greek Wikisource
- Gospel of Luke at English Wikisource

The Gospel of Luke (Note: The book is sometimes called the Gospel according to Luke (Ancient Greek: Εὐαγγέλιον κατὰ Λουκᾶν, romanized: Euangélion katà Loukân), or simply Luke (which is also its most common form of abbreviation).) is a book in the New Testament that is the third of the canonical Gospels. It tells of the origins, birth, ministry, death, resurrection, and ascension of Jesus. Together with the Acts of the Apostles, it makes up a two-volume work called Luke–Acts, accounting for 27.5% of the New Testament.

The Gospel of Luke shares the same author as the Acts of the Apostles. Tradition identifies the writer as Luke the Evangelist, a doctor who travelled with Paul the Apostle, though the text does not name its author. The author is presented as a participant in the events narrated in the first-person we passages of Acts. Most critical scholars maintain that the author was a traveling companion of Paul, though some cite differences with the Pauline epistles. Luke used the Gospel of Mark, and the two-source hypothesis also posits usage of Q, though a growing number of scholars contend Luke used Matthew instead. Most scholars now agree the Gospel of John knew and used Luke and the other Synoptics. Luke follows Mark closely compared to other ancient historians' usage of sources, though the parallels and variations of the Synoptic gospels are typical of ancient historical biographies. The most common dating for its composition is around AD 80–90. The earliest witnesses for Luke are the Alexandrian and the revised western text-type.

Following the preface and the birth narratives of John and Jesus, the gospel begins in Galilee and moves gradually to its climax in Jerusalem. Luke espouses a three-stage "salvation history" starting with the Law and the prophets, the epoch of Jesus, and the period of the church. The gospel's high Christology portrays Jesus as divine in various ways, identifying him with the God of Israel and as a preexistent messiah within its Jewish and Greco-Roman context. The Holy Spirit also plays a more prominent role compared to other Christian works, forming the basis of the early Christian community.

== Composition ==
=== Textual history ===
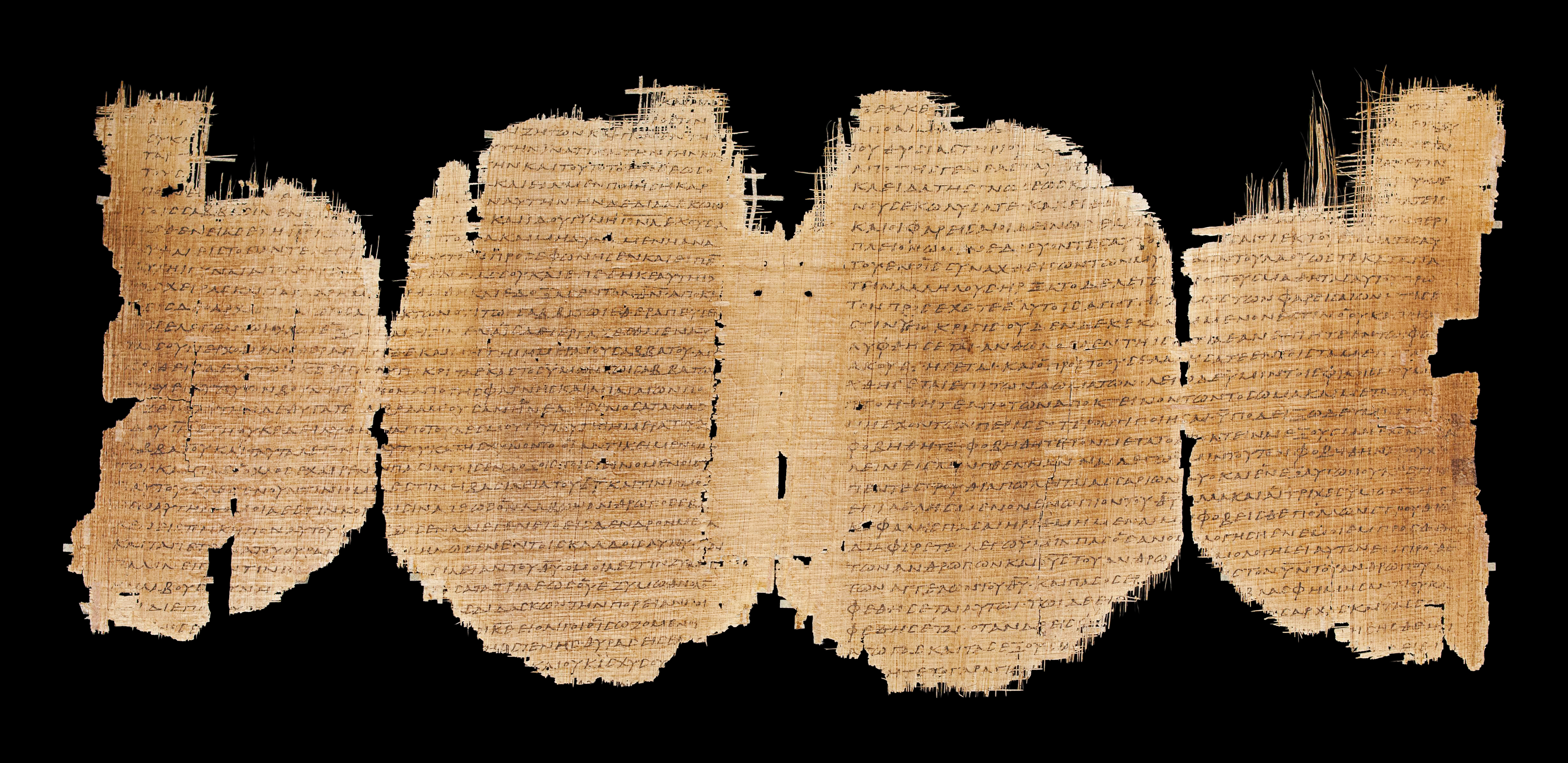
Papyrus 45, an AD 3rd-century Greek papyrus of the Gospel of Luke

Autographs (original copies) of Luke and the other Gospels have not been preserved; the texts that survive are third-generation copies, with no two completely identical. The earliest surviving manuscript of the Gospel of Luke fall into two "families" with considerable differences between them, the Western and the Alexandrian text-type, and the dominant view is that the Western text represents a process of deliberate revision in the second century, as the variations seem to form specific patterns.

The fragment 𝔓^{4} is often cited as the oldest surviving manuscript. It has been dated from the late 2nd century, although this dating is disputed. Papyrus 75 (= Papyrus Bodmer XIV–XV) is another very early manuscript (late 2nd/early 3rd century), and it includes an attribution of the Gospel to Luke. The oldest complete texts are the 4th-century Codex Sinaiticus and Vaticanus, both from the Alexandrian family; Codex Bezae, a 5th- or 6th-century Western text-type manuscript that contains Luke in Greek and Latin versions on facing pages, appears to have descended from an offshoot of the main manuscript tradition, departing from more familiar readings at many points. Codex Bezae shows comprehensively the differences between the versions which show no core theological significance. (Note: Verses 22:19–20 are omitted in Codex Bezae and a handful of Old Latin manuscripts. Nearly all other manuscripts including Codex Sinaiticus and Codex Vaticanus and Church Fathers contain the "longer" reading of Luke 22:19 and 20. Verse 22:20, which is very similar to 1 Corinthians 11:25, and provides gospel support for the doctrine of the New Covenant, along with Matthew 26:28 and Mark 14:24 (both, in the Textus Receptus Greek manuscript). Verses 22:43–44)

=== Luke–Acts: unity, authorship and date ===
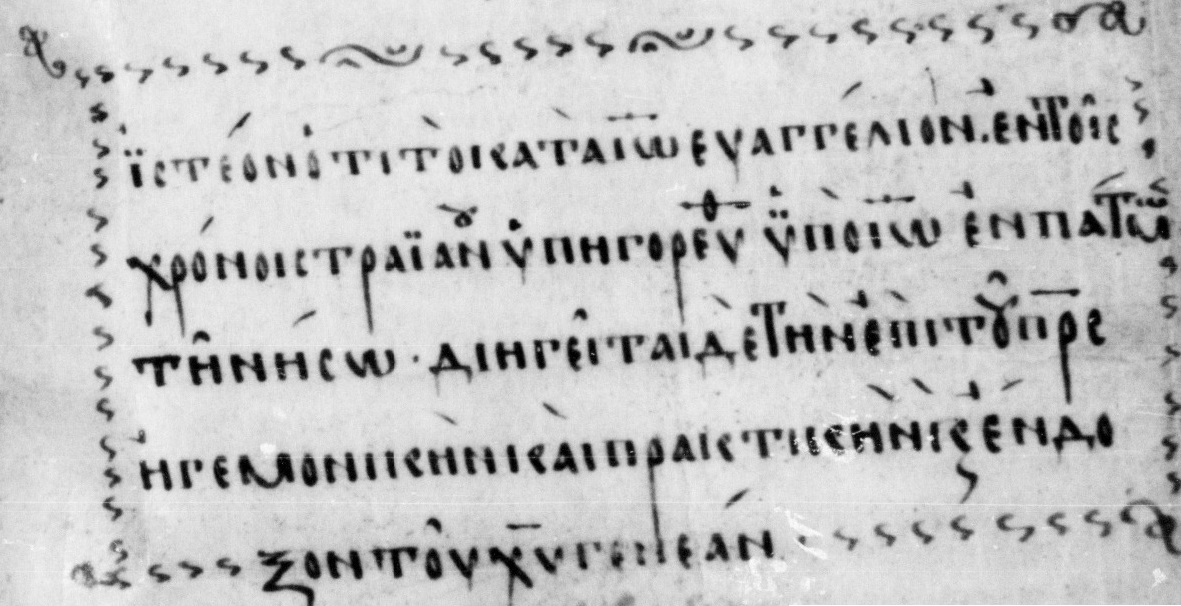
Subscriptio to the Gospel of Luke in Codex Macedoniensis 034 (Gregory-Aland), 9th century

The gospel of Luke and the Acts of the Apostles make up a two-volume work which scholars call Luke–Acts. Scholars largely agree with the tradition attributing the Gospel to the same author as the Acts of the Apostles. Together they account for 27.5% of the New Testament, the largest contribution by a single author, providing the framework for both the Church's liturgical calendar and the historical outline into which later generations have fitted their idea of the story of Jesus.

The author of the Gospel of Luke was educated, a man of means, probably urban, and someone who respected manual work, although not a worker himself; more highbrow writers of the time looked down on the artisans and small business-people who made up the early church of Paul and who were presumably Luke's audience. According to a Church tradition first recorded by Irenaeus (c. AD 130 – c. AD 202) he was the Luke named as a companion of Paul in three of the Pauline letters. Critical opinion on the tradition was assessed to be roughly evenly divided near the end of the 20th century. The author is not named in-text, as was common for ancient biographies and histories, such as Tacitus's Germania and Diogenes Laertius. Most scholars maintain that the author of Luke-Acts, whether named Luke or not, met Paul as a traveling companion. The interpretation of the "we" passages in Acts as indicative that the writer relied on a historical eyewitness (whether Luke the evangelist or not), remains the most influential in current biblical studies. (Note: A glance at recent extended treatments of the "we" passages and commentaries demonstrates that, within biblical scholarship, solutions in the historical eyewitness traditions continue to be the most influential explanations for the first-person plural style in Acts. Of the two latest full-length studies on the "we" passages, for example, one argues that the first-person accounts came from Silas, a companion of Paul but not the author, and the other proposes that first-person narration was Luke's (Paul's companion and the author of Acts) method of communicating his participation in the events narrated. See also, Barrett, Acts of the Apostles, and Fitzmyer, Acts of the Apostles, Campbell, "The 'we' passages in the Acts of the Apostles: the narrator as narrative", (2007) Society of Biblical Literature, p. 8) Objections to this viewpoint, among others, include the consensus that Luke-Acts contains differences in theology and historical narrative which are irreconcilable with the authentic letters of Paul the Apostle, though this has been challenged in recent years.

The earliest possible date for Luke–Acts is around 62 AD, the time of Paul's imprisonment in Rome, but most scholars date the work to 80–90 AD given its knowledge of Mark and the destruction of Jerusalem but not the Pauline epistles. The latest tenable dates are around the early 2nd century, as a minority posit dependence of Luke-Acts with the works of Josephus or see them as a response to Marcion. Many arguments mediate against this dating, such as the Gospel of John's awareness of the gospel, its independence from Matthew in the two-source hypothesis, and 1 Clement. Many scholars disagree with a late dating of Luke-Acts considering that it would be improbable that it would be written without any references to major events such as the burning of Rome, the first Christian persecution, or the destruction of Jerusalem and Acts concluding abruptly without any reference to Paul’s trial before Nero.

According to Bart Ehrman, while a physician named "Luke" appears in Colossians, he rejects the authenticity of that epistle, thus concluding that the historical Paul never mentions such a figure. Sean Adams contends similarly that "Luke" is underdefined in scholarship.

=== Genre, models and sources ===
Most scholars believe that Luke intended his works to convey history. Luke–Acts is a religio-political history of the founder of the church and his successors in deeds and words. The author describes his book as a "narrative" (diegesis) rather than as a gospel, and implicitly criticises his predecessors for not giving their readers the speeches of Jesus and the Apostles, as such speeches were the mark of a "full" report, the vehicle through which ancient historians conveyed the meaning of their narratives. Balch compares Luke with the works of the Classical authors Dionysius of Halicarnassus, who wrote a history of Rome (Roman Antiquities), and the Jewish historian Josephus, author of a history of the Jews (Antiquities of the Jews). Most scholars do not see a literary relationship with the latter. All three authors anchor the histories of their peoples by dating and narrating the stories of the births of the founders (Romulus, Moses, and Jesus). Each founder taught authoritatively, appeared after death, and ascended to heaven. Crucial aspects of the teaching of all three concerned the relationship between rich and poor and the question of whether "foreigners" were to be received into the people.

The gospels of Matthew, Mark and Luke are called the Synoptics, as they frequently cover the same events in similar and sometimes identical language. Mark was the earliest of the three (c. AD 70) and was used by the others, while the Two-source hypothesis posits Matthew and Luke also used the Q source, though a growing number support alternative hypotheses, such as the Farrer Hypothesis and the Matthean Posteriority Hypothesis, which argue for Luke's direct usage of Matthew and Matthew's dependence on Luke, respectively, and dispense with Q. Mark provided the narrative outline for Luke but comparatively little of Jesus' teachings. (Note: Remaining material is likely sourced rather than being a Lukan invention.) 550 verses, or nearly half of the gospel, is uniquely Lukan and grouped in two clusters. Luke tends to follow his sources closely when checked. Luke's ways of adapting Mark are comparable to that the methods used by Plutarch, including abridgements, chronological changes, and reordering events.

Holly Hearon has pointed out that the Gospel of Luke draws on both written sources and oral reports from "eyewitnesses and servants of the word," showing that the New Testament writings grew out of a living spoken environment where scripture and teaching were experienced aloud. The preface of the Gospel of Luke refers to material gathered from eyewitnesses who knew the facts at first hand, indicating that the author combined written and oral sources in an environment where both teaching and proclamation happened through spoken word.

=== Audience and authorial intent ===
The Gospel of Luke is unique among the canonical gospels for declaring the purpose and method of his work in a prologue, trying to render the Christian message in a higher literary plane. The author both classifies himself as among the many who previously attempted to write narratives of Christ while claiming his work is better and more reliable. Luke's claims of careful investigation, orderly writing, and access to accounts handed down to his community by eyewitnesses is intended to demonstrate his gospel's superiority to its predecessors. Luke was written to be read aloud to a group of Jesus-followers gathered in a house to share the Lord's Supper. The author assumes an educated Greek-speaking audience, but directs his attention to specifically Christian concerns rather than to the Greco-Roman world at large. He begins his gospel with a preface addressed to "Theophilus": the name means "Lover of God", and could refer to any Christian, though most interpreters consider it a reference to a Christian convert and Luke's literary patron. Here he informs Theophilus of his intention, which is to lead his reader to certainty through an orderly account "of the events that have been fulfilled among us". He did not, however, intend to provide Theophilus with a historical justification of the Christian faith – "did it happen?" – but to encourage faith – "what happened, and what does it all mean?"

== Structure and content ==
=== Structure ===
Following the author's preface addressed to his patron and the two birth narratives (John the Baptist and Jesus), the gospel opens in Galilee and narrates Jesus’ preaching of the kingdom of God before moving gradually to a fulfillment in the Passion and Resurrection narratives:

1. A brief preface addressed to Theophilus stating the author's aims;
2. Birth and infancy narratives for both Jesus and John the Baptist, interpreted as the dawn of the promised era of Israel's salvation;
3. Preparation for Jesus' messianic mission: John's prophetic mission, his baptism of Jesus, and the testing of Jesus' vocation;
4. The beginning of Jesus' mission in Galilee, and the hostile reception there;
5. The central section: the journey to Jerusalem, where Jesus knows he must meet his destiny as God's prophet and Messiah;
6. His mission in Jerusalem, culminating in confrontation with the leaders of the Jewish Temple;
7. His last supper with his most intimate followers, followed by his arrest, interrogation, and crucifixion;
8. God's validation of Jesus as Christ: events from the first Easter to the Ascension, showing Jesus' death to be divinely ordained, in keeping with both scriptural promise and the nature of messiahship, and anticipating the story of Acts. (Note: For studies of the literary structure of this Gospel, see recent contributions of Bailey, Goulder and Talbert, in particular for their readings of Luke's Central Section. (Almost all scholars believe the section begins at 9.51; strong case, however, can be put for 9.43b.) Then the introductory pieces to the opening and closing parts that frame the teaching of the Central Section would exhibit a significant dualism: compare 9.43b–45 and 18.31–35. The Central Section would then be defined as 9.43b–19.48, 'Jesus Journey to Jerusalem and its Temple'. Between the opening part ('His Setting out', 9.43b–10.24) and the closing part ('His Arriving', 18.31–19.48) lies a chiasm of parts 1–5, C,5'–1', 'His Teachings on the Way': 1, 10.25–42 Inheriting eternal life: law and love; 2, 11.1–13 Prayer: right praying, persistence, Holy Spirit is given; 3, 11.14–12.12 The Kingdom of God: what is internal is important; 4, 12.13–48 Earthly and Heavenly riches; the coming of the Son of Man; 5, 12.49–13.9 Divisions, warning and prudence, repentance; C, 13.10–14.24 a Sabbath healing, kingdom and entry (13.10–30), Jesus is to die in Jerusalem, his lament for it (13.31–35), a Sabbath healing, banqueting in the kingdom (14.1–24); 5', 14.25–15.32 Divisions, warning and prudence, repentance; 4', 16.1–31 Earthly and Heavenly riches: the coming judgement; 3', 17.1–37 The kingdom of God is 'within', not coming with signs; 2', 18.1–17 Prayer: persistence, right praying, receiving the kingdom; 1', 18.18–30 Inheriting eternal life: law and love. (All the parts 1–5 and 5'–1' are constructed of three parts in the style of ABB'.))

=== Parallel structure of Luke–Acts ===
The structure of Acts parallels the structure of the gospel as a mutual interpreter of the two-part work, demonstrating the universality of the divine plan and the shift of authority from Jerusalem to Rome:

- The gospel – the acts of Jesus:
  - The presentation of the child Jesus at the Temple in Jerusalem
  - Jesus' forty days in the desert
  - Jesus in Samaria/Judea
  - Jesus in the Decapolis
  - Jesus receives the Holy Spirit
  - Jesus preaches with power (the power of the spirit)
  - Jesus heals the sick
  - Death of Jesus
  - The apostles are sent to preach to all nations
- The acts of the apostles:
  - Jerusalem
  - Forty days before the Ascension
  - Samaria
  - Asia Minor
  - Pentecost: Christ's followers receive the spirit
  - The apostles preach with the power of the spirit
  - The apostles heal the sick
  - Death of Stephen, the first martyr for Christ
  - Paul preaches in Rome

== Theology ==
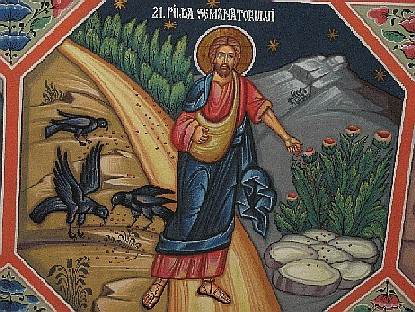
Parable of the Sower ('din Deal' Orthodox Church, Cluj-Napoca, Romania)

=== Christology ===
Luke's understanding of Jesus – his Christology – is central to his theology. One approach to this is through the titles Luke gives to Jesus: these include, but are not limited to, Christ (Messiah), Lord, Son of God, and Son of Man. Another is by reading Luke in the context of similar Greco-Roman divine saviour figures (Roman emperors are an example), references which would have made clear to Luke's readers that Jesus was the greatest of all saviours. A third is to approach Luke through his use of the Old Testament, those passages from Jewish scripture which he cites to establish that Jesus is the promised Messiah. Whilst not as overt as John, scholars have found that the Synoptic gospels portray Jesus as divine in various ways. According to C. Kavin Rowe, Luke binds the identity of Jesus and the God of Israel into one, compelling a description of Lukan Christology in Trinitarian terms. Caleb Friedeman and Simon Gathercole argue for Luke's portrayal of Jesus as a preexistent messiah.

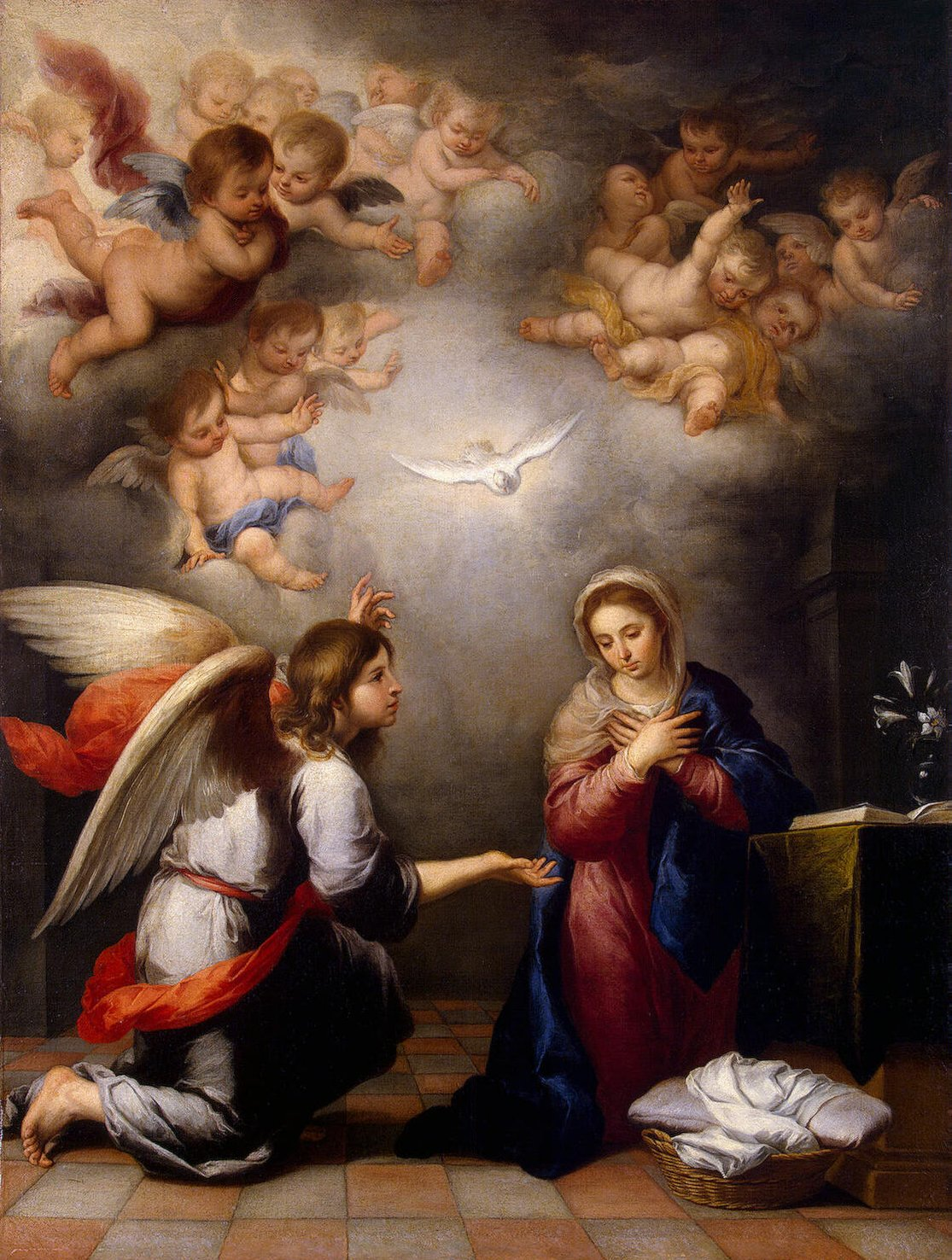
Annunciation (Murillo)

Some scholars have found a diversity of Christological views in Luke-Acts. Ehrman argues for differences between Luke 2:11, where Jesus was the Christ at his birth, and Acts 2:36, and 3:20; similarly, in Luke he is the Saviour and Son of God from birth, but in Acts 5:31 he is made Saviour at the resurrection. John Robinson also argued that Acts 2:36 and 3:12–26 displayed incompatible christologies, though his argument has not convinced many. Many of these differences may be due to scribal error, but others are argued to be deliberate alterations to doctrinally unacceptable passages, or the introduction by scribes of "proofs" for their favourite theological tenets.

=== Soteriology ===
There is great debate among scholars regarding the soteriology of Luke. Exegetes agree that Luke makes relatively little reference to the concept of atonement, but explanations for this phenomenon vary; some scholars argue that the author did not adhere to Jesus's death as salvific, while others contend that Luke simply did not emphasize Jesus's sacrifice in the speeches in Acts directed at unbelievers.

=== The Holy Spirit, the Christian community, and the Kingdom of God ===
The Holy Spirit plays a more important role in Luke–Acts than in the other gospels. Some scholars have argued that the Spirit's involvement in the career of Jesus is paradigmatic of the universal Christian experience, others that Luke's intention was to stress Jesus' uniqueness as the Prophet of the final age. It is clear, however, that Luke understands the enabling power of the Spirit, expressed through non-discriminatory fellowship ("All who believed were together and had all things in common"), to be the basis of the Christian community. Luke's theology is expressed primarily through his overarching plot, the way scenes, themes and characters combine to construct his specific worldview. His "salvation history" stretches from the Creation to the present time of his readers, in three ages: first, the time of "the Law and the Prophets", the period beginning with Genesis and ending with the appearance of John the Baptist; second, the epoch of Jesus, in which the Kingdom of God was preached; and finally the period of the Church, which began when the risen Christ was taken into Heaven, and would end with the kingdom's final consummation, not be seen till the Son of Man comes "on a cloud" at his second coming.

=== Christians vs. Rome and the Jews ===
Luke needed to define the position of Christians in relation to the Roman Empire and Judaism. Luke makes clear that, while Christians are not a threat to the established order, the rulers of this world hold their power from Satan, and the essential loyalty of Christ's followers is to God and this world will be the kingdom of God, ruled by Christ. Despite the unfavorable depictions of the army prevalent in literature of the time, the role of the Roman military in Luke-Acts is particularly positive due to the function soldiers play in the Lukan narrative of gentile mission. The author of Luke-Acts would not settle for anything less than the conversion of Israel, with the fulfillment of divine promise being contingent on Israel’s repentance. A central theme is that the message of Christ was sent to the Gentiles because the Jews rejected it. Some scholars have argued that Luke is against Israel itself, the consensus has moved away from the view that Luke held unfavorable views on Judaism.

== Comparison with other writings ==
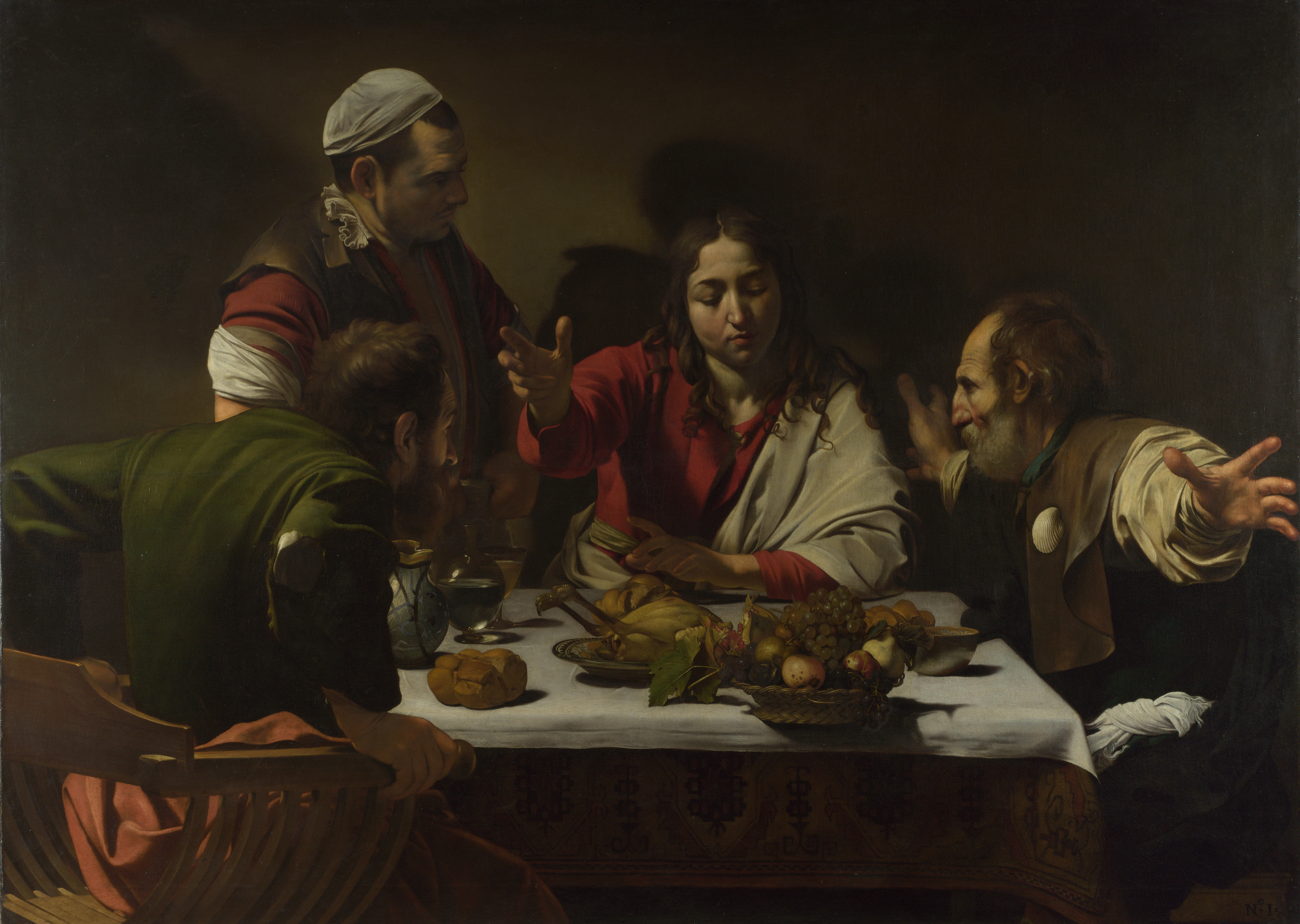
Supper at Emmaus (1601), Caravaggio, National Gallery

=== Acts of the Apostles ===
The Gospel of Luke is the only canonical gospel with a sequel, the Acts of the Apostles. Many modern scholars agree that Acts was intended to be a fundamental part of the Lukan evangelist's plans and purpose from the beginning. According to Loveday Alexander, the preface of Acts can either be understood as signifying its status as the second volume of a unified work or more simply a cue to readers that it represents a sequel to the Gospel of Luke.

=== Mark ===
Luke is not especially critical of the content of Mark but mainly corrects his source's grammatical syntax, lection, and style instead. The disciple Peter is given a notably more positive depiction than the other three gospels, with his failings either occluded or excused, and his merits and role emphasized. Luke and Matthew treat their sources more conservatively than other ancient historians such as Josephus or Diodorus Siculus, though the parallels and variations of the Synoptic gospels are typical of ancient historical biographies. According to Johnson, Luke follows Mark's narrative more faithfully than does Matthew.

=== The Gospel of John ===
Despite being grouped with Matthew and Mark, the Gospel of Luke has a number of parallels with the Gospel of John which are not shared by the other synoptics:

- Luke uses the terms "Jews" and "Israelites" in a way unlike Mark, but like John.
- Both gospels have characters named Mary of Bethany, Martha, and Lazarus, although John's Lazarus is portrayed as a real person, while Luke's is a figure in a parable.
- There are several points where Luke's passion narrative resembles that of John. At Jesus' arrest, only Luke and John state that the servant's right ear was cut off.

For much of the twentieth century, the consensus was that John was independent of the Synoptics, but due to the parallels and similarities most scholars now accept the Synoptics as sources for John.

=== The Gospel of Marcion ===
Sometime in the 2nd century, the Christian thinker Marcion of Sinope began using a gospel that was very similar to, but shorter than, canonical Luke. Marcion was well known for preaching that the god who sent Jesus into the world was a different, higher deity than the creator god of Judaism. The majority of scholars view the Gospel of Marcion as a later work that edited the gospel of Luke.

While no manuscript copies of Marcion's gospel survive, reconstructions of his text have been published by Adolf von Harnack and Dieter T. Roth, based on quotations in the anti-Marcionite treatises of orthodox Christian apologists, such as Irenaeus, Tertullian, and Epiphanius. These early apologists accused Marcion of having "mutilated" canonical Luke by removing material that contradicted his unorthodox theological views. According to Tertullian, Marcion also accused his orthodox opponents of having "falsified" canonical Luke.

Like the Gospel of Mark, Marcion's gospel lacked any nativity story, and Luke's account of the baptism of Jesus was absent. The Gospel of Marcion also omitted Luke's parables of the Good Samaritan and the Prodigal Son.

== Reception history ==
Many scholars, notably Mark Goodacre, argue for John's knowledge of Luke and the other Synoptics. Ignatius of Antioch (c. 108) may also provide early attestation for the Gospel of Luke. Acts 2:24 may find reflection in Polycarp’s Philippians 1:2. Christopher Tuckett has argued that the Didache presupposes the existence of the Gospel of Luke, both in 1.3-2.1 and in 16.1. The Second Epistle of Clement (early- to mid- second century) could also presuppose Luke. The Gospel of Thomas (140s CE) demonstrates familiarity with Lukan redaction.

== See also ==
- Authorship of Luke–Acts
- List of Gospels
- List of omitted Bible verses
- Marcion
- Order of St. Luke
- Synoptic Gospels
- Synoptic problem
- Textual variants in the Gospel of Luke

== Notes ==
Gospel of Luke Synoptic Gospel
Preceded by Gospel of Mark	New Testament; Books of the Bible	Succeeded by Gospel of John
