= Macedoniarch =

Roman-era title for president of the Koinon of Macedonians

Macedoniarch (Greek: μακεδονιάρχης) was a Roman-era title for the president of the Koinon of Macedonians. The title was only given to 11 people.

== Office ==
The Macedoniarch was the president of the Koinon of Macedonians, and sometimes but not always the chief priest of the Roman imperial cult in Roman Macedonia. The office was also considered an important official of the Synhedrion, a provincial council consisted of municipal aristocracy, Roman citizens, and - in some cases - slaves and freedmen. The Macedoniarch also headed an influential club called the society of Sarapiasts starting from the reign of the Severan dynasty.

== History ==
The earliest record of a Macedoniarch to come from Thessalonica is from 219 AD. The title was only held by 11 people, six of which are believed to be of Roman descent, based upon them having a cognomen. An account, however, cited that epigraphic evidences recorded two Macedoniarchs during the first century AD and 23 the following century.

== See also ==
- Politarch
