= Luke–Acts =

Biblical work containing the books of Luke and Acts

Luke–Acts is the composite work of the Gospel according to Luke and the Acts of the Apostles in the New Testament. Both of these books of the Bible are credited to Luke. They also describe the narrative of those who continued to spread Christianity, ministry of Jesus and the subsequent ministry of the apostles and the Apostolic Age.

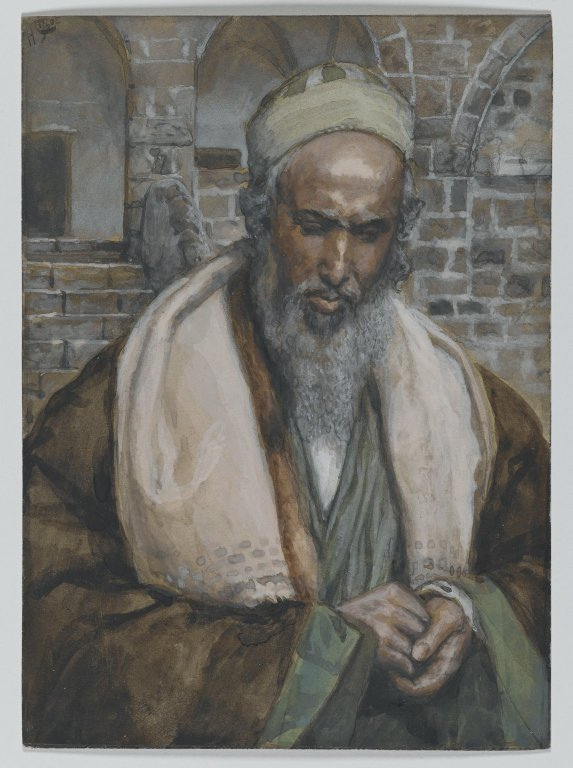
Luke the Evangelist, painted by James Tissot (c. 1886–94)

== Authorship ==
Both the books of Luke and Acts are narratives written to a man named Theophilus. The book of Acts starts out with: "The former treatise have I made", probably referring to the Gospel of Luke. The view that they were written by the same person is virtually unanimous among scholars. Luke–Acts has sometimes been presented as a single book in published Bibles or New Testaments, for example, in The Original New Testament (1985) and The Books of the Bible (2007).

Luke is the longest of the four gospels and the longest book in the New Testament; together with Acts of the Apostles it makes up a two-volume work from the same author, called Luke–Acts. The cornerstone of Luke–Acts' theology is "salvation history", the author's understanding that God's purpose is seen in the way he has acted, and will continue to act, in history.

== Composition and setting ==
It divides the history of first-century Christianity into three stages, with the gospel making up the first two of these – the arrival among men of Jesus the Messiah, from his birth to the beginning of his earthly mission in the meeting with John the Baptist followed by his earthly ministry, Passion, death, and resurrection (concluding the gospel story per se). Luke used the Gospel of Mark for the narrative of Christ's earthly life. While Two-source theorists maintain the Q source, other scholars increasingly argue Luke used Matthew directly or vice versa. The study of hypothetical pre-Gospel sources is declining in scholarship.

The work is Hellenized and written for a gentile audience possibly, though it does not express interest in later Gnosticism or hold to an Ignatian ecclesiology. Marcion, a famous 2nd-century heretic, who used a modified form of Luke known as the Gospel of Marcion, did not use Acts, perhaps because he was unaware of it or intentionally excluded it from his biblical canon; Irenaeus, a proto-orthodox apologist, is the first to use and mention Acts, specifically against Marcionism.

Some scholars note that there are two versions of Luke–Acts with the longer version 10–20 percent longer than the shorter version. Scholars disagree on which came first.

== See also ==
- The Lost Chapter of the Acts of the Apostles

== Bibliography ==
- Allen, O. Wesley Jr. (2009). "Luke". In Petersen, David L.; O'Day, Gail R. (eds.). Theological Bible Commentary. Westminster John Knox Press. ISBN 978-1-61164-030-4.
- Hedrick, Charles W.; Hodgson, Robert Jr. (1986), Nag Hammadi, Gnosticism, and Early Christianity: Fourteen Leading Scholars Discuss the Current Issues in Gnostic Studies, Peabody, Massachusetts: Hendrickson Publishers, ISBN 978-0913573167
- Johnson, Luke Timothy (2010). The New Testament: A Very Short Introduction. Oxford University Press. ISBN 978-0-19-974599-9.
- Thompson, Richard P. (2010). "Luke–Acts: The Gospel of Luke and the Acts of the Apostles". In Aune, David E. (ed.). The Blackwell Companion to The New Testament. Wiley–Blackwell. p. 319. ISBN 978-1-4443-1894-4.
- Joseph B. Tyson, Marcion and Luke-Acts: A defining struggle, University of South Carolina Press, 2006, ISBN 1-57003-650-0
