= Politarch =

Title

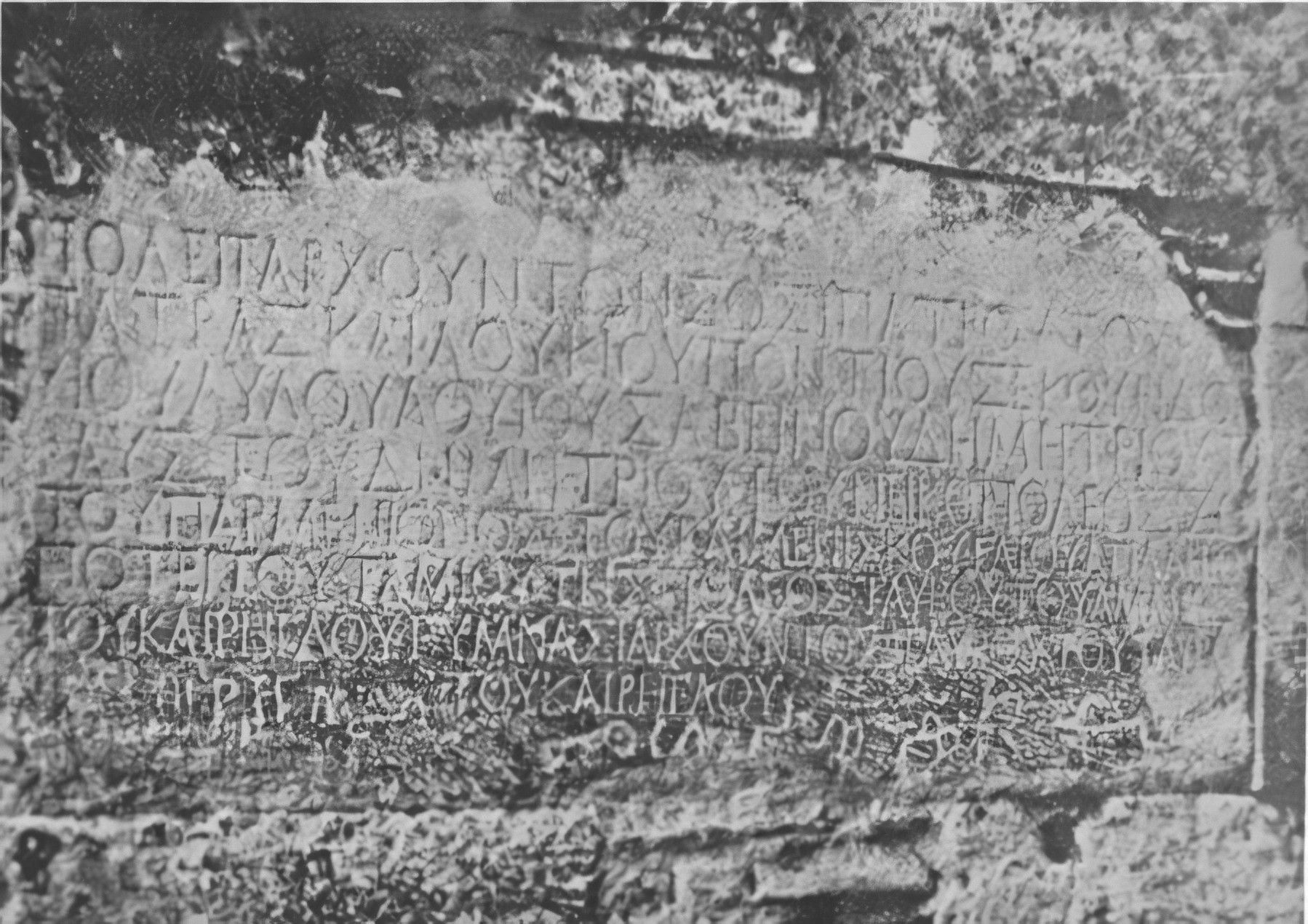
On-site photograph of the 2nd century AD Politarch inscription in Thessaloniki.

The Politarch (Greek: πολιτάρχης, politarches; plural πολιτάρχαι, politarchai) was a government official of Hellenistic and Roman Greece, with police powers. The institution over which they presided was called Politarchy. In modern Greece, the title was used by Ioannis Kapodistrias for the first Greek law enforcement and security force.

== Ancient Greece ==
The first evidence of the politarchs is dated to the reign of King Perseus of Macedon in Amphipolis, where the king with two politarchs honoured Artemis Tauropolos after a Thracian campaign. One of the earliest extant inscriptions to use the term "Politarch" was located on the Vardar Gate in Thessaloniki. The Gate was unfortunately destroyed in 1876 but the inscription, which dates to the 2nd Century AD, can now been seen in the British Museum in London.

The politarchs are attested in the Acts of the Apostles (17:6,8) concerning the city of Thessalonike; The Apostle Paul, visiting Thessalonike, taught three Sabbaths in the synagogue, the Jews wanted to arrest him, but, failing to find him "they drew Jason and certain brethren unto the politarchs" (17:6).

Ιt is not known how many politarchs each city of Macedon had. As for Thessalonike itself, according to the inscriptions, in the years of Augustus there were five, while in the years of Antoninus and Marcus Aurelius there were six.

== Modern Greece ==
After the Greek War of Independence, Ioannis Kapodistrias created the Politarchy (Πολιταρχία) as the first police and security force of Greece.

== See also ==
- Macedoniarch
