= De Blois =

de Blois
- Pronunciation: French: [dəblwa] English: /dəˈblwɑː/
- Language: French

de Blois, often written as DeBlois or Deblois, is a surname meaning "from Blois", a city in central France. The surname is most common in Quebec.

== People with this surname ==
- Charles Deblois (born 1939), Canadian politician
- Dean DeBlois (born 1970), Canadian film director, screenwriter, and animator
- Natalie de Blois (1921–2013), American architect
- Stephen Wastie Deblois (1780–1844), businessman and political figure in Nova Scotia
- George Wastie Deblois (1824–1886), businessman and political figure in Prince Edward Island
- Joseph-François Deblois (1797–1860), lawyer, judge and political figure in Lower Canada
- George Des Brisay de Blois (1887–1958), 14th Lieutenant Governor of Prince Edward Island, Canada
- Lucien DeBlois (born 1957), Canadian ice hockey player
- Pierre Antoine Deblois (1815–1898), Quebec farmer, businessman and politician
- Tony DeBlois (born 1970), American blind autistic savant and multi-instrumentalist

=== Medieval figures ===
- Stephen, King of England (1092 or 1096–1154), King of England from 1136 until his death, of the House of Blois
- Louis de Blois (1506–1566), Flemish monk and writer, generally known under the name of Blosius
- Stephen de Blois, 2nd Earl of Albemarle (d. 1127), Count of Aumale and Lord of Holderness, also known as Stephen of Aumale
- Charles de Blois (1319–1364), Duke of Brittany from 1341 to his death
- Guillaume de Blois (1135–1202), French cardinal, also called William of the White Hands and William White Hands
- Robert de Blois (fl. 13th century), Old French poet and trouvère
- William de Blois (bishop of Lincoln) (d. 1206), medieval Bishop of Lincoln
- Peter de Blois (c. 1130 – c. 1211) a French cleric, theologian, poet and diplomat

== See also ==
- Deblois, Maine, town in the United States
- DeBlois, Prince Edward Island, settlement in the Canadian province of Prince Edward Island
