= Biblioteca Nacional =

Biblioteca Nacional (Spanish or Portuguese: National Library) may refer to:

- Biblioteca Nacional de Chile, in Chile
- Biblioteca Nacional de España, in Spain
- Biblioteca Nacional del Perú, in Peru
- Biblioteca Nacional de Portugal, in Portugal
- Biblioteca Nacional de la República Argentina, in Argentina
- Biblioteca Nacional "Miguel Obregón Lizano", in Costa Rica
- Fundação Biblioteca Nacional, in Brazil

== See also ==
- List of national and state libraries
