= Philo (disambiguation) =

Philo of Alexandria (20 BCE – 40 CE) was a Hellenistic Jewish philosopher who lived in Alexandria, in the Roman province of Egypt.

Philo may also refer to:

== People ==
=== Given name ===
- Philo of Byblos (64–141 CE), writer of grammatical, lexical and historical works in Greek
- Philo of Tarsus, 1st century CE Greek physician
- Philo of Hyampolis, 1st century CE Greek physician
- Philo of Larissa (159/8 BC–84/3 BC), Greek philosopher
- Philo (poet), 1st century Hellenistic Jewish epic poet
- Philo of Byzantium (c. 280 BC–c. 220 BC), Greek engineer
- Philo the Dialectician (fl. 300 BC), ancient Greek philosopher
- Philo of Cilicia, 2nd century deacon
- Philo Dibble (1951–2011), American diplomat
- Philo Dunning (1819–1900), American politician
- Philo Farnsworth (1906–1971), American inventor
- Philo C. Fuller (1787–1855), American lawyer and politician
- Philo Hall (1865–1938), American politician
- Philo Miner Lonsbury (1835–1922), Michigan politician and soldier
- Philo McCullough (1893–1981), American actor
- Philo McGiffin (1860–1897), American naval officer
- Philo A. Orton (1837–1919), American politician and jurist
- Philo Wallace (born 1970), Barbadian cricketer

=== Surname ===
- Aaron Philo, American football player
- Chris Philo (born 1960), professor of geography at the University of Glasgow
- Mark Philo (1984–2006), English footballer
- Phoebe Philo (born 1973), British fashion designer
- William Philo (1882–1916), British middleweight boxer and Olympic bronze medalist

=== Other ===
- Nickname of Phil Lynott (1949–1986), Irish musician and songwriter
- Philomaine Nanema (born 1982), a.k.a. Philo, Burkinabé comedian and actress

== Places in the United States ==
- Philo, California, a census-designated place
- Philo Township, Champaign County, Illinois
- Philo, Illinois, a village
- Philo, Ohio, a village
  - Philo Power Plant, a former power plant in Philo, Ohio
- Philo High School, Duncan Falls, Ohio

== Academics ==
- Philo (journal), a secular naturalist philosophy journal
- "Philo", a Columbia University term for a member of the Philolexian Society or to the organization
- "Philo", a University of Pennsylvania term for a member of the Philomathean Society or to the organization

== Fictional characters ==
- Philo Beddoe, the Clint Eastwood character in the film Every Which Way but Loose and its sequel, Any Which Way You Can
- Philomel Hartung of Mana-Khemia: Alchemists of Al-Revis, referred to as Philo
- Philo Vance, an American detective in 12 novels and numerous films
- Philo, from the Fraggle Rock television series
- Philo, a Roman soldier in Shakespeare's play Antony and Cleopatra
- Philo, from the "Weird Al" Yankovic film UHF
- Philo, in David Hume's Dialogues Concerning Natural Religion

== Record labels ==
- Philo Records (rhythm & blues), founded in 1946
- Philo Records (folk), founded in 1973, a contemporary folk branch of Rounder Records, and part of Concord Music.

== Other uses ==
- Philo (company), an American internet television company
- Philos (automobile), a French automaker, in business from 1912 to 1923
- Philo, a luxury wristwatch line marketed under the Benrus brand

== See also ==
- Pseudo-Philo, an anonymous historian in Hebrew whose translated works were compiled with those of Philo of Alexandria
- Philon, Greek architect of the 4th century BC
- Philos basilikos, the lowest rank of Aulic titulature in Hellenistic antiquity
- Phylo (disambiguation)
- Filo, a Middle Eastern pastry dough
