= Filo (disambiguation) =

Filo is a very thin unleavened dough used for making pastries.

Filo, Fillo or Fillos may also refer to:

- Filó (born 1972), Portuguese footballer
- Filo (name)
- Domenick Filopei, American musical artist; see Filo & Peri
- El Filo, a town in Mexico
- Filipino (ethnicity)

== See also ==
- Philo (disambiguation)
- LIFO (disambiguation)
