= L'Amour médecin =

French comedy by Molière

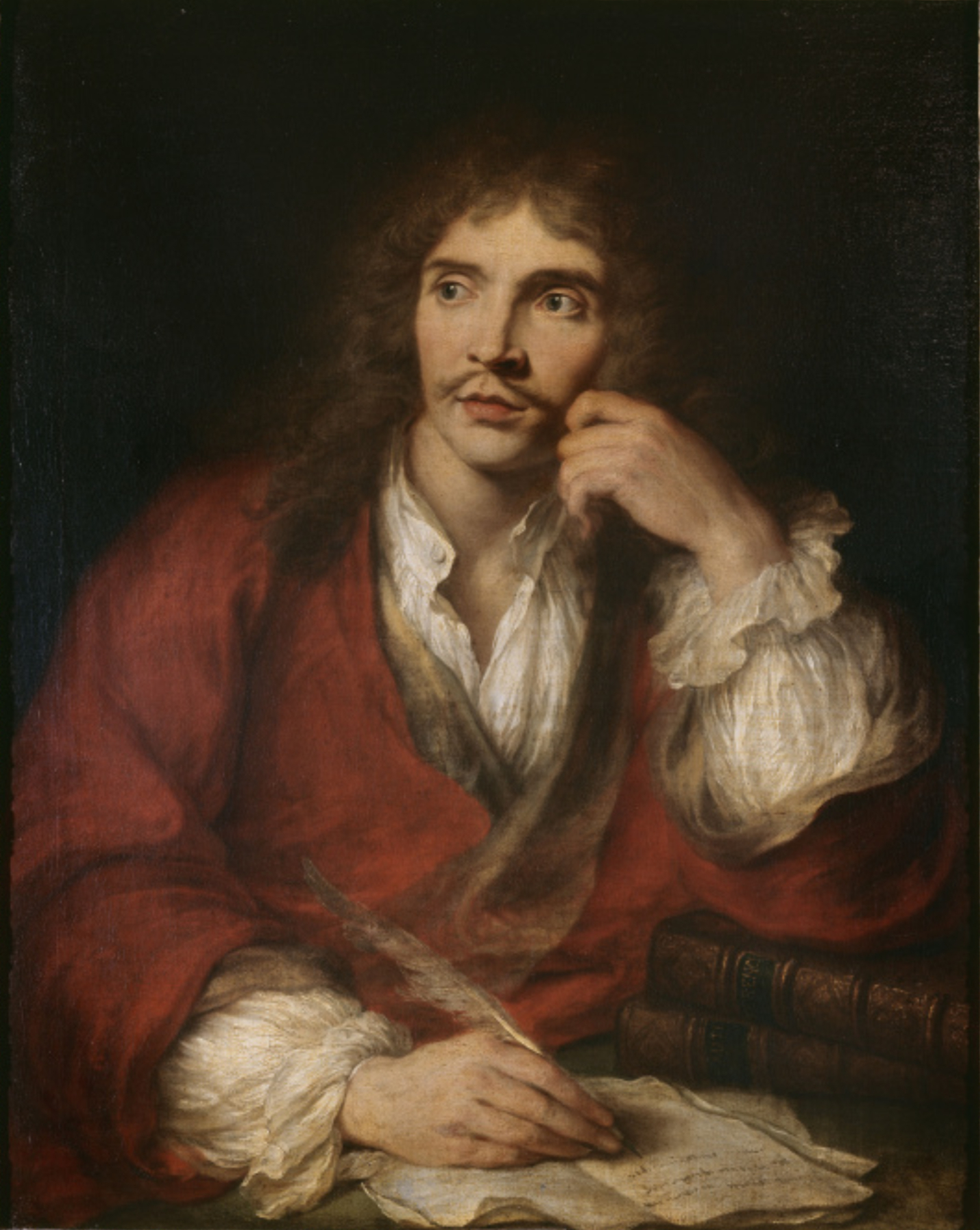
- Portrait of the author
- Original language: French
- Written by: Molière
- Characters: Sganarelle; Lisette; Lucinde; Clitandre; Monsieur Filerin; Monsieur; Des Fonanadrès; Monsieur Tomès
- Genre: Comedy, romance
- Setting: Paris, France

Premiere
- Date: September 22, 1665

L'Amour médecin (transl. Dr. Cupid) is a French comedy written by Molière. It was presented for the first time by order of King Louis XIV at Versailles on September 22, 1665. Molière's foreword to the text states that the play is only a sketch, a mere impromptu commissioned for one of the Royal Entertainments. It was the most hurriedly written of all his commissioned works. It was written, rehearsed, and performed, all within five days. Original music was composed for the play by Jean-Baptiste Lully. This music still exists and has been recorded in recent years.

== Characters ==
=== Main ===
==== Sganarelle ====
A bourgeois whose attention span is limited to his own egoistic ambitions, Sganarelle is blind to his daughter's love life.

==== Lucinde ====
The daughter of Sganarelle who is in love with Clitandre.

==== Lisette ====
Lucinde's maid who acts as her advisor. She is not afraid to talk back to her master (Sgaranelle) or to show her disdain for doctors.

=== Secondary ===
- Clitandre: In love with Lucinde

==== Doctors ====
The doctors are all based upon real life doctors who lived during the 17th century. All are the same in the fact that they always try to save face and generally act foolishly. However, when it comes to a diagnosis they always tend to disagree. They feel it is more important to follow the rules laid by famous physicians such as Hippocrates than to save the patient. Any alteration from path that would ruin their reputation. Always out to make money, they are really just charlatans as they have no useful knowledge of medicine.

- Monsieur Tomès: Favours bloodletting as a treatment
- Monsieur Des Fonanadrès: Favours emetic as a treatment
- Monsieur Macroton: When speaking, draws out each word in an exaggerated fashion
- Monsieur Bahys: Speaks with a stammer
- Monsieur Filerin: A powerful doctor who is well respected. Tells Tomès and Des Fonanadrès not to fight in front of other people because it makes them suspicious and less respectful of the medical profession.

=== Minor ===
- Aminte: Neighbour of Sganarelle and Lucinde.
- Lucrèce: Niece of Sganarelle and cousin of Lucinde.
- Monsieur Josse: Friend of Sganarelle and a jeweller.
- Monsieur Guillaume: Friend of Sganarelle and a carpet merchant.

== Plot ==
=== Acte I ===
The play starts off with Lucinde who is inexplicably depressed. Desperate to cheer her up, Sganarelle offers her whatever she wishes. When she declares that she wants to be married he becomes angry, refuses to grant her desire, and storms off. Later on in a monologue, Sganarelle admits that his reason for refusing Lucinde's request is because he cannot stand the thought of her with another man, a man who would also inherit Sganarelle's fortune. Lisette and Lucinde decide that they will play a trick on Sganarelle to show him the errors of his ways. At the end of the first scene, we have Lucinde pretending to be ill, forcing Sganarelle to call for doctors.

=== Acte II ===
The doctors have all arrived and they talk about their daily travels. Lisette enters and argues with Tomès about a former patient of his who is now dead. Instead of talking about what is wrong with Lucinde, the doctors talk about current events and argue whose mule is faster. Here the audience sees that they care more for following procedure than actually saving a life. As the doctors get around to the diagnosis, Tomès and Des Fonanadrès disagree on the cure for Lucinde. The former advocates a blood letting, whereas the latter is preaching the use of an emetic. As the two storm away, Bahys and Macroton inform Sganarelle that despite their "best" efforts his daughter will still die. They console him with the knowledge that his daughter would have died following the rules. As an act of desperation, Sganarelle visits a street charlatan to purchase Orviétan, a legendary remedy that can cure any illness, but the audience never learns if he gives this to Lucinde.

=== Acte III ===
Clitandre arrives disguised as a doctor and quickly tends to Lucinde. Impressed by this young doctor, Sganarelle asks him what the mysterious illness was. Clitandre declares that it must have been a severe case of depression and only a marriage will cheer her up. Furthermore, he announces that he will trick Lucinde into believing that he and she are married in order to cheer her up. The two lovers leave to get married and Sganarelle throws a party to celebrate Lucinde's recovery. Sgaranelle signs a marriage contract which he believes is fake that gives the couple a dowry of 20,000 écus. It is here where he is informed by Lisette that the two really have been married, and that the whole thing was a trick. Sganarelle becomes angry, but is restrained by party goers as the festivities continue into the night.
