= Polycarp =

Christian bishop of Smyrna (69–155)

Saint Polycarp of Smyrna
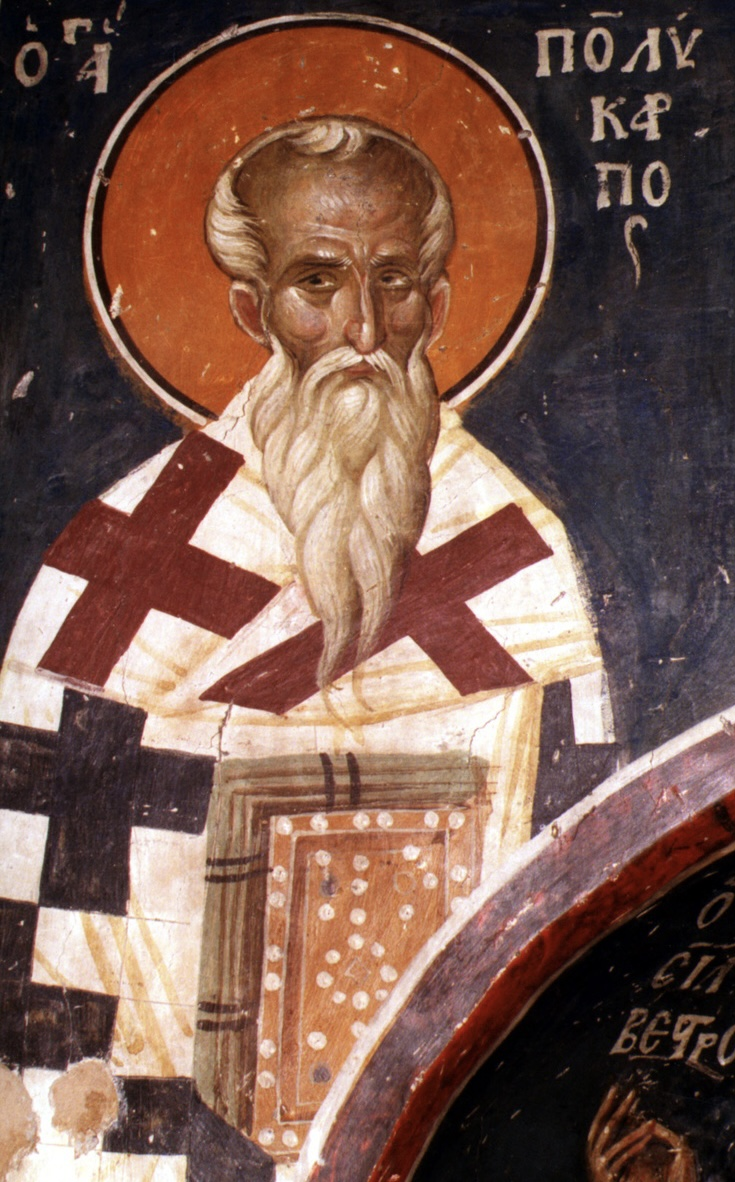
- fresco from the Church of St. George, Staro Nagoričane

Church Father Bishop of Smyrna and Hieromartyr
- Born: 69 AD; Smyrna, Roman Empire
- Died: 155 AD (aged 85–86); Smyrna, Roman Empire
- Venerated in: Eastern Orthodox Church; Catholic Church; Oriental Orthodox Churches; Church of the East; Lutheranism; Anglicanism
- Major shrine: Sant'Ambrogio della Massima, Rome
- Feast: 23 February (formerly 26 January)
- Attributes: Wearing the pallium, holding a book representing his Epistle to the Philippians
- Patronage: Earache sufferers
- Influences: Clement of Rome, John the Apostle
- Influenced: Irenaeus
- Major works: Epistle of Polycarp to the Philippians

Polycarp (/ˈpɒlikɑːrp/; Greek: Πολύκαρπος, Polýkarpos; Latin: Polycarpus; AD 69–155) was a Christian bishop of Smyrna. According to the Martyrdom of Polycarp, he died a martyr, bound and burned at the stake, then stabbed when the fire failed to consume his body. Polycarp is regarded as a saint and Church Father in the Eastern Orthodox Church, the Catholic Church, Oriental Orthodox Churches, Lutheranism, and Anglicanism.

Both Irenaeus and Tertullian say that Polycarp had been a disciple of John the Apostle, one of Jesus's disciples. In On Illustrious Men, Jerome similarly writes that Polycarp was a disciple of John the Apostle, who had ordained him as a bishop of Smyrna. Polycarp is regarded as one of three chief Apostolic Fathers, along with Clement of Rome and Ignatius of Antioch.

== Surviving writings and early accounts ==
The sole surviving work attributed to him is the Epistle of Polycarp to the Philippians, a mosaic of references to the Septuagint, which, along with an account of the Martyrdom of Polycarp, forms part of the collection of writings called Apostolic Fathers. After the Acts of the Apostles, which describes the death of Stephen, the Martyrdom is considered one of the earliest genuine accounts of a Christian martyrdom. Charles E. Hill argues extensively that the teachings Irenaeus ascribes to a certain apostolic presbyter throughout his writings represent lost teachings of Polycarp, his teacher. Within the lost epistle of Irenaeus to Florinus as cited by Eusebius within his Ecclesiastical History book 5.20. we observe Irenaeus make mention of multiple epistles authored by him to the neighbouring churches and to certain individuals.

Some scholars (e.g., Hans von Campenhausen) attribute the pastoral epistles—the biblical books 1 Timothy, 2 Timothy, and the Epistle to Titus—to Polycarp. Since the text of those books includes attribution to Paul, this theory regarding Polycarp's authorship places the books in the category of pseudepigrapha.

== Life ==
The chief sources of information concerning the life of Polycarp are The Martyrdom of Polycarp, Against Heresies, The Epistle to Florinus, the epistles of Ignatius, and Polycarp's own letter to the Philippians. In 1999, the Harris Fragments, a collection of 3rd- to 6th-century Coptic texts that mention Polycarp, were published.

=== Link to the Apostles and Jesus ===
According to Irenaeus, Polycarp was a companion of Papias, another "hearer of John", and a correspondent of Ignatius of Antioch which the document titled The Martyrdom of Ignatius confirms:

And after a great deal of suffering he came to Smyrna, where he disembarked with great joy, and hastened to see the holy Polycarp, formerly his fellow disciple, and now bishop of Smyrna. For they had both, in old times, been disciples of St. John the Apostle.

— Martyrdom of Ignatius, Ch. 3

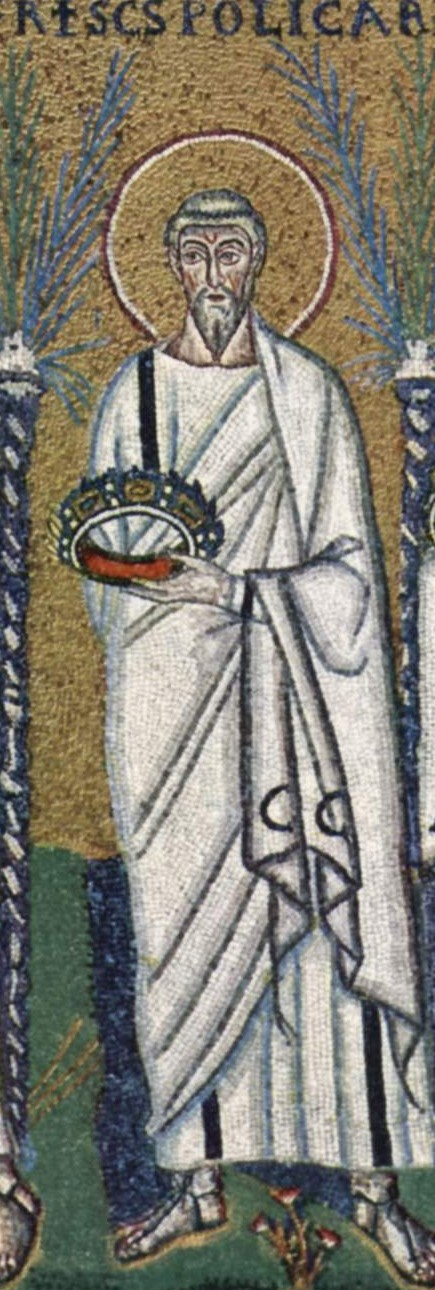
Mosaic of Saint Polycarp from the Basilica of Sant'Apollinare Nuovo in Ravenna, Italy

Ignatius addressed a letter to Polycarp and mentions him in his letters to the Ephesians and to the Magnesians. Polycarp's epistle to the Philippians gives us some insights to the early usage of early Christian texts from the quotes used within his letter. Irenaeus regarded the memory of Polycarp as a link to the apostolic past. In his letter to Florinus, a fellow student of Polycarp, Irenaeus relates how and when he became a Christian:

I could tell you the place where the blessed Polycarp sat to preach the Word of God. It is yet present to my mind with what gravity he everywhere came in and went out; what was the sanctity of his deportment, the majesty of his countenance; and what were his holy exhortations to the people. I seem to hear him now relate how he conversed with John and many others who had seen Jesus Christ, the words he had heard from their mouths.

In particular, Irenaeus had heard the account of Polycarp's discussion with John and with others who had seen Jesus. Irenaeus reports that Polycarp was converted to Christianity by apostles, was consecrated a presbyter, and communicated with many who had seen Jesus. He writes that he had had the good fortune, when young, to know Polycarp, who was then far advanced in years.

=== New Testament ===
Polycarp demonstrates familiarity with the First Epistle of John and possibly the Second Epistle of John.

=== Visit to Anicetus ===
According to Irenaeus, during the time his fellow Syrian Anicetus was Bishop of Rome, Polycarp visited Rome to discuss differences in the practices of the churches of Anatolia and Rome. Irenaeus states that on certain issues the two speedily came to an understanding, while as to the observance of Easter, each adhered to his own custom without breaking off full communion with the other. Polycarp followed the Eastern practice of celebrating the feast on the 14th of Nisan, the day of the Jewish Passover, regardless of the day of the week on which it fell, while Anicetus followed the Western practice of celebrating the feast on the first Sunday following the first full moon after the spring equinox. Anicetus allowed Polycarp to celebrate the Eucharist in his own church, which was regarded by the Romans as a great honor.

=== Martyrdom ===
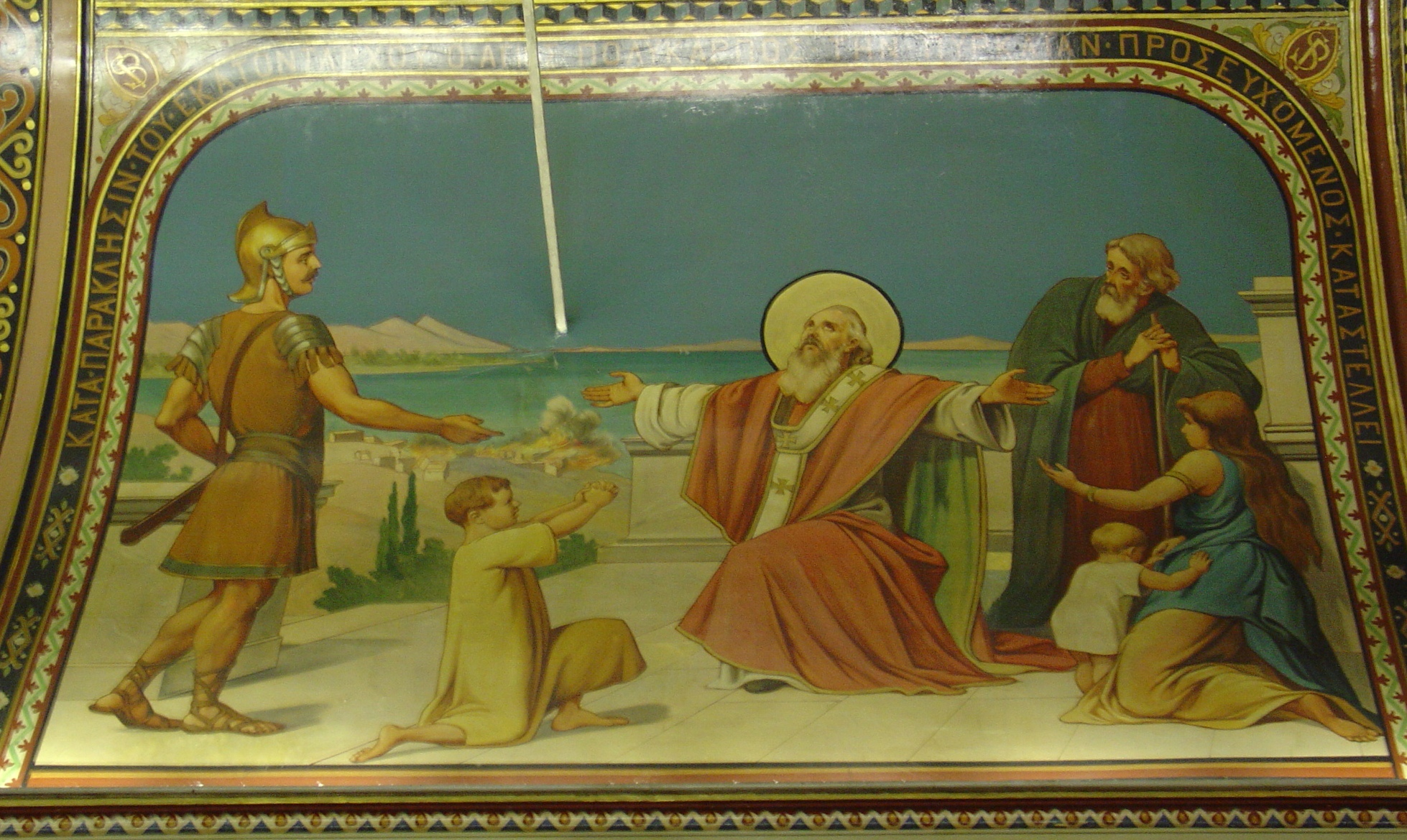
Polycarp miraculously extinguishing the fire burning the city of Smyrna

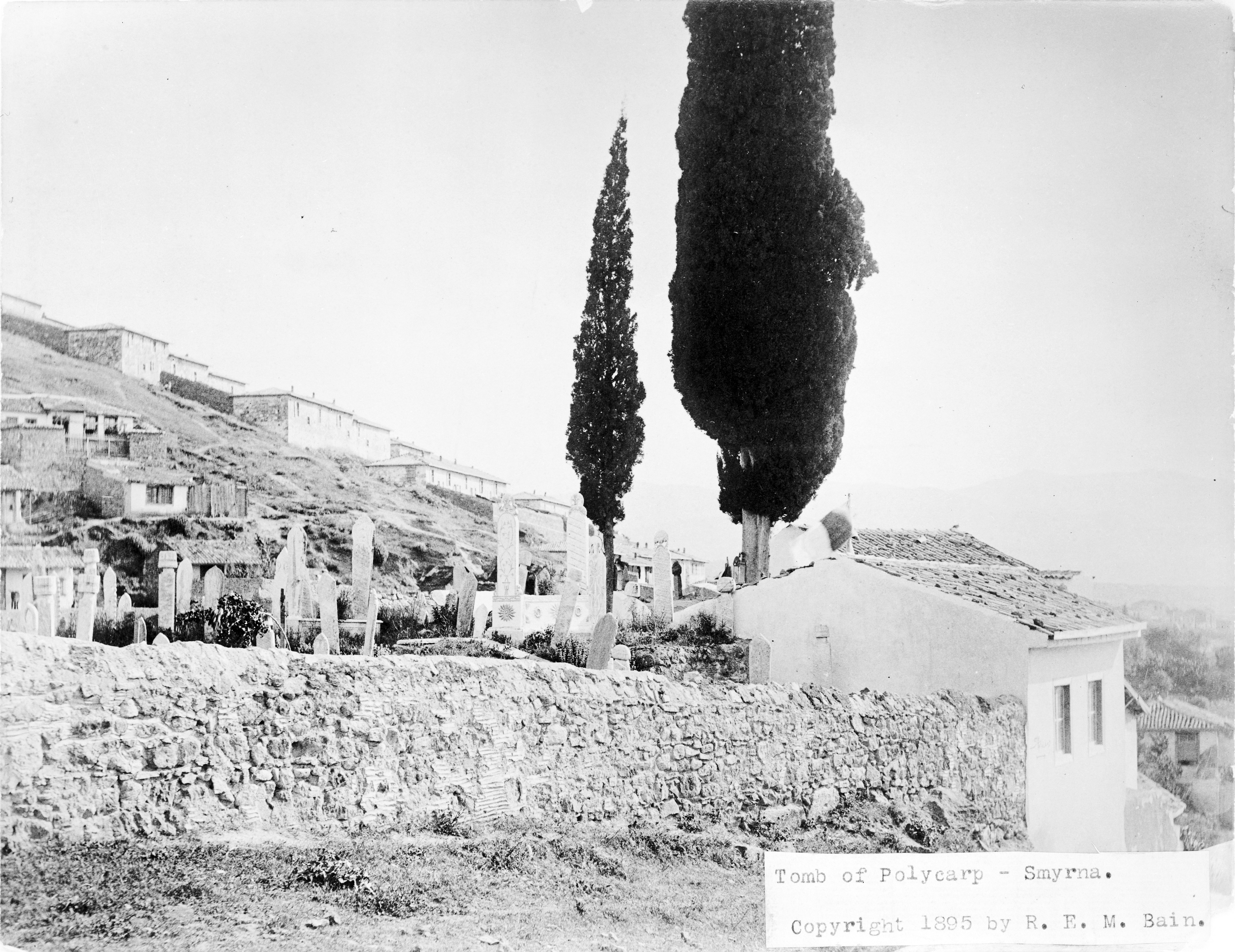
Tomb of Polycarp in Smyrna (modern-day Izmir), 1895

In the Martyrdom of Polycarp, Polycarp is reported to say on the day of his death: "Eighty and six years I have served Him, and He has done me no wrong." This could indicate either that he was then eighty-six years old or that he had lived eighty-six years after his conversion. Polycarp goes on to say: "How then can I blaspheme my King and Savior? You threaten me with a fire that burns for a season, and after a little while is quenched; but you are ignorant of the fire of everlasting punishment that is prepared for the wicked." Polycarp was burned at the stake and pierced with a spear for refusing to burn incense to the Roman emperor. On his farewell, he said: "I bless you, Father, for judging me worthy of this hour, so that in the company of the martyrs I may share the cup of Christ."

The date of Polycarp's death is in dispute. Eusebius dates it to the reign of Marcus Aurelius, c. 166–167. However, a post-Eusebian addition to the Martyrdom of Polycarp dates his death to Saturday, 23 February, during the proconsulship of Lucius Statius Quadratus, c. 155 or 156. These earlier dates better fit the tradition of his association with Ignatius and John the Apostle.

The Martyrdom of Polycarp states that Polycarp was taken on the Sabbath and killed on "the Great Sabbath". English patristic scholar William Cave wrote that this was evidence that the Smyrnaeans under Polycarp observed the seventh-day Sabbath (i.e. assembled on Saturdays). J. B. Lightfoot records as a common interpretation of the expression "the Great Sabbath" to refer to Passover or another Jewish festival. This is contradicted by the standard Jewish calendar, under which the 14th of Nisan (the date of Passover) can fall no earlier than late March and hence at least a month after the traditional date of Polycarp's death 23 February. Hence, Lightfoot understood the expression in reference to the Purim festival, celebrated a month before Passover. Other scholars suggest that at the time the Jewish calendar had not yet been standardized, and that this day, Jews and Christians celebrated Passover and a Christian Passover, respectively.

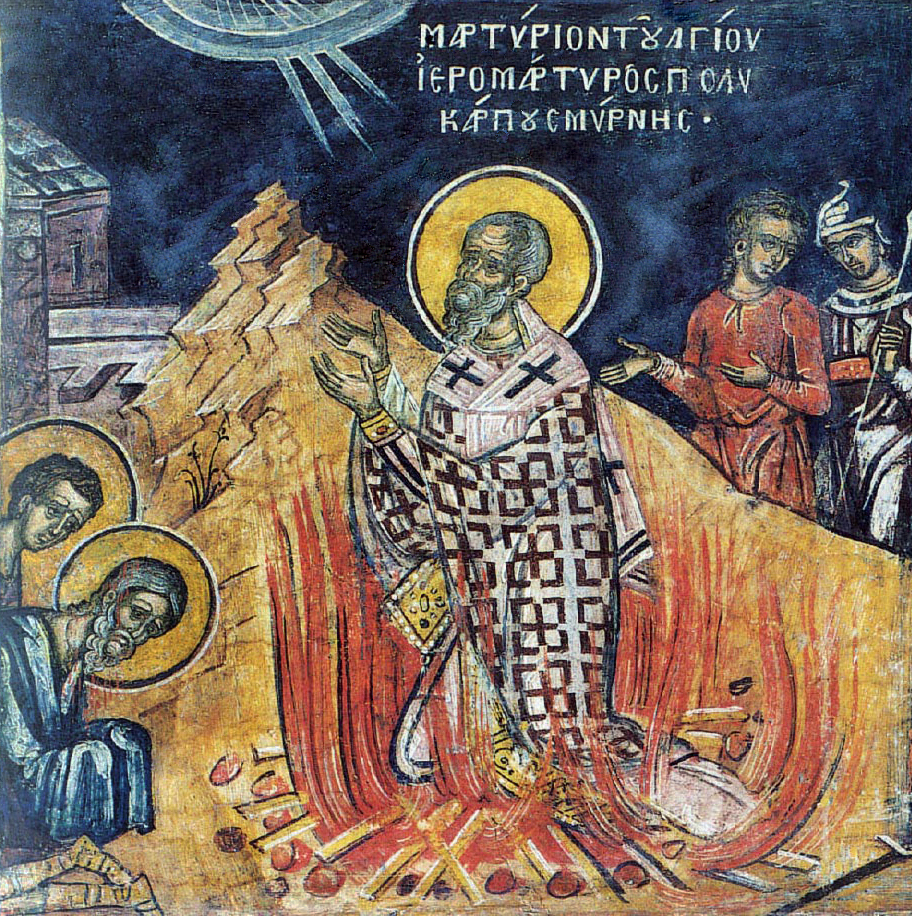
Fresco of the Martyrdom of Saint Polycarp from Dionysiou Monastery, 1547

== Importance ==
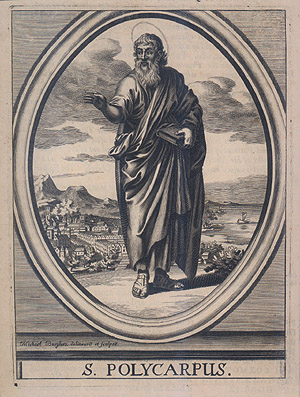
Engraving by Michael Burghers, c. 1685

Polycarp occupies an important place in the history of the early Christian Church. His contemporaries called him "the most admirable Polycarp one of these [elect], in whose times among us he showed himself an apostolic and prophetic teacher and bishop of the Catholic Church in Smyrna." He is among the earliest Christians whose writings survived. Jerome wrote that Polycarp was a "disciple of the apostle John and by him ordained presbyter of Smyrna". He was an elder of an important congregation that was a large contributor to the founding of the Christian Church. He is from an era whose orthodoxy is accepted alongside Catholics by the ancient Eastern Orthodox Church and Oriental Orthodox Churches, and widely also by mainstream Protestants, Church of God groups, and Sabbatarians.

According to Eusebius, Polycrates of Ephesus cited the example of Polycarp in defense of local practices during the quartodeciman controversy.

Irenaeus, who as a young man had heard Polycarp preach, described him as "a man who was of much greater weight, and a more steadfast witness of truth, than Valentinus, and Marcion, and the rest of the heretics." Polycarp lived in an age after the deaths of the apostles, when a variety of interpretations of the sayings of Jesus were being preached. His role was to authenticate orthodox teachings through his connection with the apostle John: "a high value was attached to the witness Polycarp could give as to the genuine tradition of old apostolic doctrine", "his testimony condemning as offensive novelties the figments of the heretical teachers". Irenaeus states (iii. 3) that on Polycarp's visit to Rome, his testimony converted many disciples of Marcion and Valentinus.

== Veneration and commemoration ==
The Martyrdom of Polycarp is one of the earliest, if not the earliest, accounts of the veneration of the relics of a saint and the annual commemoration of a saint on the date of his or her death:

And so we afterwards took up his bones which are more valuable than precious stones and finer than refined gold, and laid them in a suitable place; where the Lord will permit us to gather ourselves together, as we are able, in gladness and joy, and to celebrate the birth-day of his martyrdom for the commemoration of those that have already fought in the contest, and for the training and preparation of those that shall do so hereafter.

Relics of Polycarp are under the main altar of the church of Sant'Ambrogio della Massima. The right arm of St. Polycarp had been kept at the Monastery of the Dormition of the Theotokos-Saint Polycarp, in Ampelakiotissa near Nafpaktos, Greece, for over 500 years. It was stolen on 14 March 2013 and never recovered; however, a fragment, taken from the arm on a previous occasion, was discovered and returned to the monastery on 14 July 2019.

In the Roman Catholic, Eastern Orthodox and Greek Catholic churches, the feast day of Saint Polycarp is 23 February. In the Roman Catholic liturgical calendar, the feast day has the liturgical rank of obligatory memorial, but if the memorial is within the season of Lent that year, it is reduced in rank to a commemoration. In the Coptic Orthodox Church, his feast day is on 29 Amshir (8 March in the Gregorian calendar). Polycarp is remembered in the Church of England with a Lesser Festival on 23 February. He is also honored in the Lutheran churches on 23 February.

== Theology ==
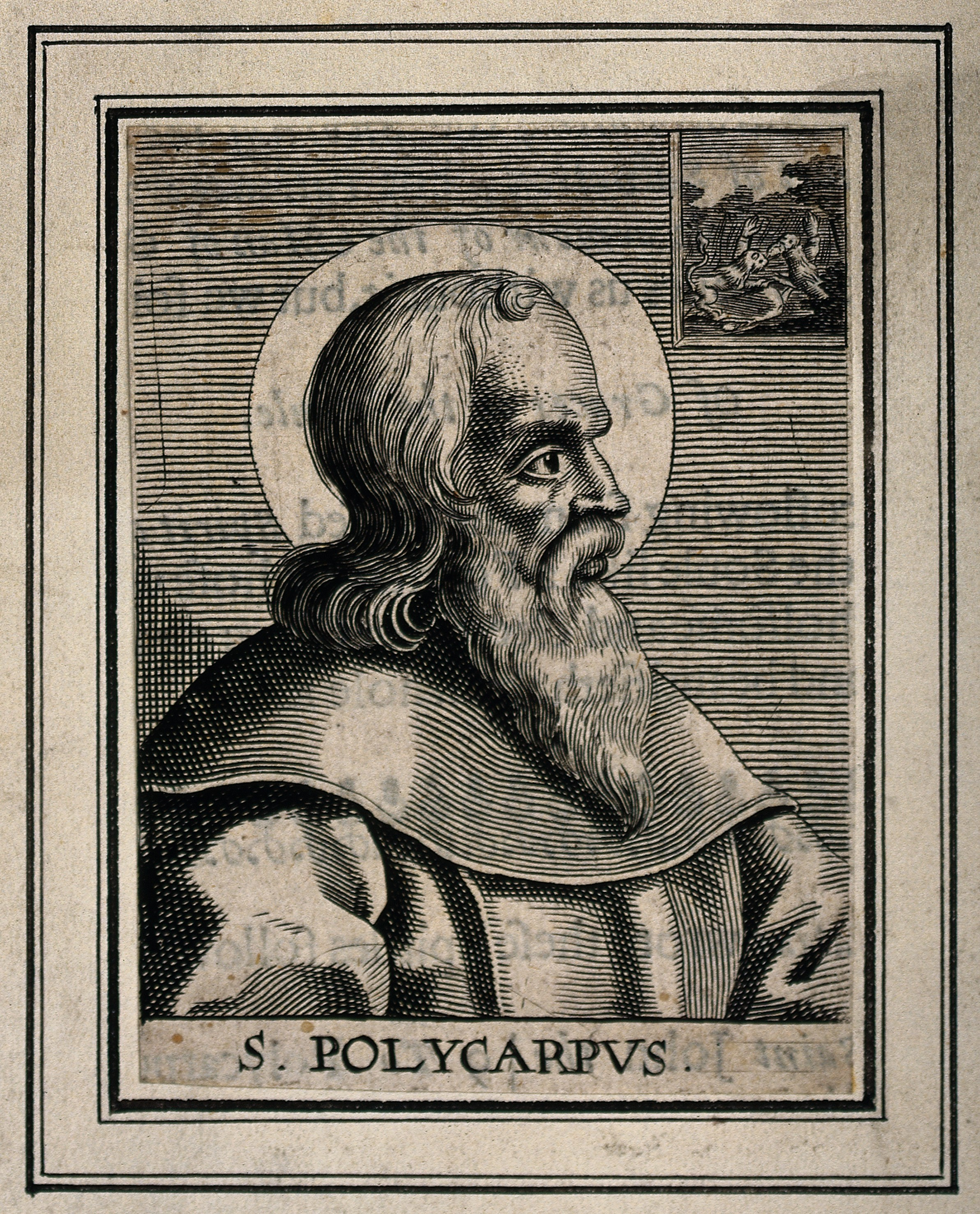
Saint Polycarp

Polycarp's soteriology is not clear; he does cite Ephesians 2:8 to say salvation is by grace rather than works, though later exhorts his readers to do good works. It is not clear from the text how he views works in relation to salvation as his comments are too little to make a clear conclusion. He could have believed that works are mere results of saving grace or that they are necessary to keep salvation and that they have meritorious value, thus we cannot know if he was a monergist or a synergist.

Polycarp in his letter calls Jesus the "son of God" and the "eternal high priest" and that "to him all heavenly and earthly things were subjected, whom every breath worships, who comes as a judge of the living and the dead". He also highlighted the sinlessness of Jesus, defended the doctrine of the Incarnation and the death of Christ on the cross, and clearly opposed docetism. Polycarp outright denied the teachings of Marcion, claiming he was the firstborn of Satan. Polycarp's statements in the Martyrdom of Polycarp also appear to have trinitarian theology.

What we know of Polycarp's eschatology is largely confined to the affirmation of the resurrection of the dead and Christ's second coming as a judge. Polycarp was perhaps a premillennialist; Polycarp's student Irenaeus was a premillennialist along with his associate Papias, which suggests that Polycarp also held similar views.

Polycarp refers to multiple books of the New Testament as scripture, including: Matthew, Acts, 1 John, Philippians, Jude, 1 Peter, 1 Timothy, 2 Timothy, Romans and others. Polycarp also quotes the deuterocanonical book of Tobit; however, from his manner of quotation it is not possible to know how much authority he afforded it.

Polycarp's letter to the Philippians only mentions presbyters and deacons, which indicates the church at Philippi was led by a plurality of "elder-bishops", which would imply a different ecclesiastical polity than what is found in Ignatius of Antioch's letters. Against this, according to Steinhauser, the letter does not offer concrete evidence that the Philippian church viewed presbyters and bishops as synonyms, though still admitting that the letter still raises questions about the polity of the early church. Steinhauser hypothesized that there was possibly a temporary vacancy in the Philippian church.

Polycarp was a Quartodeciman. According to Eusebius, Polycarp claimed that he celebrated Easter on the 14th of Nisan with John the Apostle. Polycarp appears to make heresy a more serious issue than immorality. Polycarp calls immoral people to repent but called the false teachers "firstborn of Satan."

Polycarp stated, "I have served him [Christ] eighty-six years and in no way has he dealt unjustly with me." Proponents of infant baptism have argued that this quote shows Polycarp being baptized as an infant, the argument being that if Polycarp was a servant of Christ for 86 years, he would have been a servant of Christ from infancy, suggesting infant baptism. However, Credobaptists such as Schoedel William have offered a different interpretation of the words of Polycarp, stating that the quote is ambiguous as regards baptism, and that Polycarp can be understood as meaning by paraphrasing: "I have always served Jesus and I am not going to cease even at the age of 86."

== See also ==
- Christianity in the 1st century
- Christianity in the ante-Nicene period
- Early Christianity
- List of Christian martyrs
- Saint Polycarp, patron saint archive
