= Athenodoros =

Athenodoros, Athenodorus or Athinodoros, 'gift of Athena', may refer to:

- Athenodoros of Eretria, a writer of unknown age, mentioned by Photios I of Constantinople in his Bibliotheca, as having written a work titled Memoranda (ὑπομνηματα)
- Athenodoros of Aenos (modern Enez), a rhetorician mentioned in Philostratus's Lives of the Sophists, who was said to have lived in the time of Castor and Pollux
- Athenodoros of Cleitor, 5th century BCE sculptor
- Athenodoros of Teos, 4th century BCE musician
- Athenodorus (actor) (fl. 342–329 BC), Greek actor
- Athenodorus of Soli (fl. mid-3rd century BC), Stoic philosopher, disciple of Zeno of Citium, and brother of the poet Aratus
- Athenodorus of Imbros (4th century BC), ancient Greek mercenary
- Athenodorus of Rhodes (fl. 1st century BC), sculptor, pupil of Agesander of Rhodes
- Athenodoros Cananites (74–7 BC), Stoic philosopher
- Athenodoros Cordylion (fl. early-mid 1st century BC), Stoic philosopher and keeper of the library of Pergamum
- Athenodoros of Rhodes, a rhetorician mentioned by Quintilian in his Institutio Oratoria
- Athenodoros (physician), doctor of the 1st or 2nd century AD
- Athenodorus of Byzantium (fl. 2nd century AD), bishop of Byzantium from 144 until 148
- Vaballathus or Wahb Allāt (fl. late 3rd century AD), known as Athenodoros in Greek; Athena was matched with Allāt by interpretatio Graeca.
- Athenodorus (Isaurian general) (fl. 5th century AD), Isaurian general of the Isaurian War
- Claudius Athenodorus (fl. 1st century AD), Roman eques
- Athinodoros Prousalis (1926–2012), Greek actor
