= Filo (name) =

Filo or Fillo may refer to the following people:

Given name

- Filo Paulo (born 1987), New Zealand rugby player
- Filo Tiatia (born 1971), New Zealand rugby player
- Filo, American Idol contestant in season 23

Surname

- David Filo (born 1966), American businessman, co-founder of Yahoo!
- John Filo (born 1948), American photographer
- Frank Filo (born 1971), American football player
- Martin Fillo (born 1986), Czech football player
- Michal Filo (born 1984), Slovak football striker
- Stefania Filo Speziale (1905–1988), Italian architect
- Tamás Filó (born 1979), Hungarian football player
- Vladimír Filo (1940–2015), Slovak Roman Catholic bishop
- Xavier Su'a-Filo (born 1991), American football player
- Yuval Filo (born 1998), Israeli rhythmic gymnast

Nickname

- Filó (Filipe André Paula da Rocha, born 1972), Portuguese footballer and manager
