= Orvietan =

17th and 18th century panacea

Orvietan or orviétan was a medical concoction popular during the 17th and 18th centuries. It was used as a panacea against poisonings with criminal intent, as well as against mushroom poisonings, snakebite, scorpion stings, bites by rabid animals, and the plague.

== Origins ==
Gerolamo Ferranti started producing and selling orviétan in early 17th-century Paris. He was a fairground attraction, asking onlookers to give him unknown poisons to swallow and watch him cure himself with the remedy. Other charlatans in the business were Jean Vitrario, Desiderio Descombes, and Cristoforo Contugi. Though most physicians and pharmacists were skeptical, the reputed medical doctor Johann Schröder published his own recipe in Pharmacopeia Medico-Chymica in 1655. The first pharmacist to include orviétan in his compendium was Moyse Charas in Pharmacopée Royale Galénique et Chymique, 1676.

== Ingredients ==
Orvietan was a concoction of partially toxic herbs, wine, and dissolved honey, but existed in powdered form too (sold in lead boxes). Patrizia Catellani and Renzo Console analyzed 35 different recipes for mixing orvietan, published between 1655 and 1857. The number of ingredients varies from 9 to 57. The most frequent 26 ingredients are: garden angelica, healing wolfsbane, birthwort, bistort, sweet flag, Carline thistle, dittany, gentian, masterwort, black salsify, tormentil, valerian, blessed thistle, dittany of Crete, rue, germander, laurel berries, juniper berries, cinnamon, cloves, viper meat, and the two concoctions mithridate and theriac, as well as white wine and honey.

== Literary references ==
Literary works mentioning orvietan include:

- Tabarin's Inventaire Universel des Œuvres de Tabarin (1622),
- Molière's L'Amour médecin (1665),
- Voltaire's Pot-pourri (1765),
- Mme de Sevigne's correspondence,
- Balzac's Le Père Goriot,
- Alexandre Dumas père's Marquise de Ganges,
- Victor Hugo's L'homme qui rit
- Walter Scott's Kenilworth (1821), though Scott translates it as Venice treacle
- Walter Scott's The Talisman (1825), in Chapter XXI King Richard notes "I have but to take a drachm of orvietan by way of precaution, though it is needless" after sucking poison from a wound.
- Francis Parkman, in his La Salle and the Discovery of the Great West (1869), notes the explorer Louis Hennepin's devotion to the use of orvietan, "the famous panacea of his time", as an antidote to the toxic effects of various plants eaten while a captive of the Sioux in 1680
- La Salle's Tonty also used orvietan as he noted in Relation of Henri de Tonty Concerning the Explorations of La Salle from 1678 to 1683, Melvin B. Anderson, translator.

== See also ==
- Snake oil
