= Theriac =

Medieval medical concoction

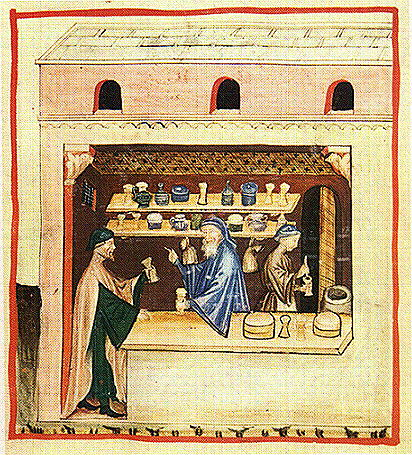
Preparation of theriac: illustration from the Tacuinum sanitatis

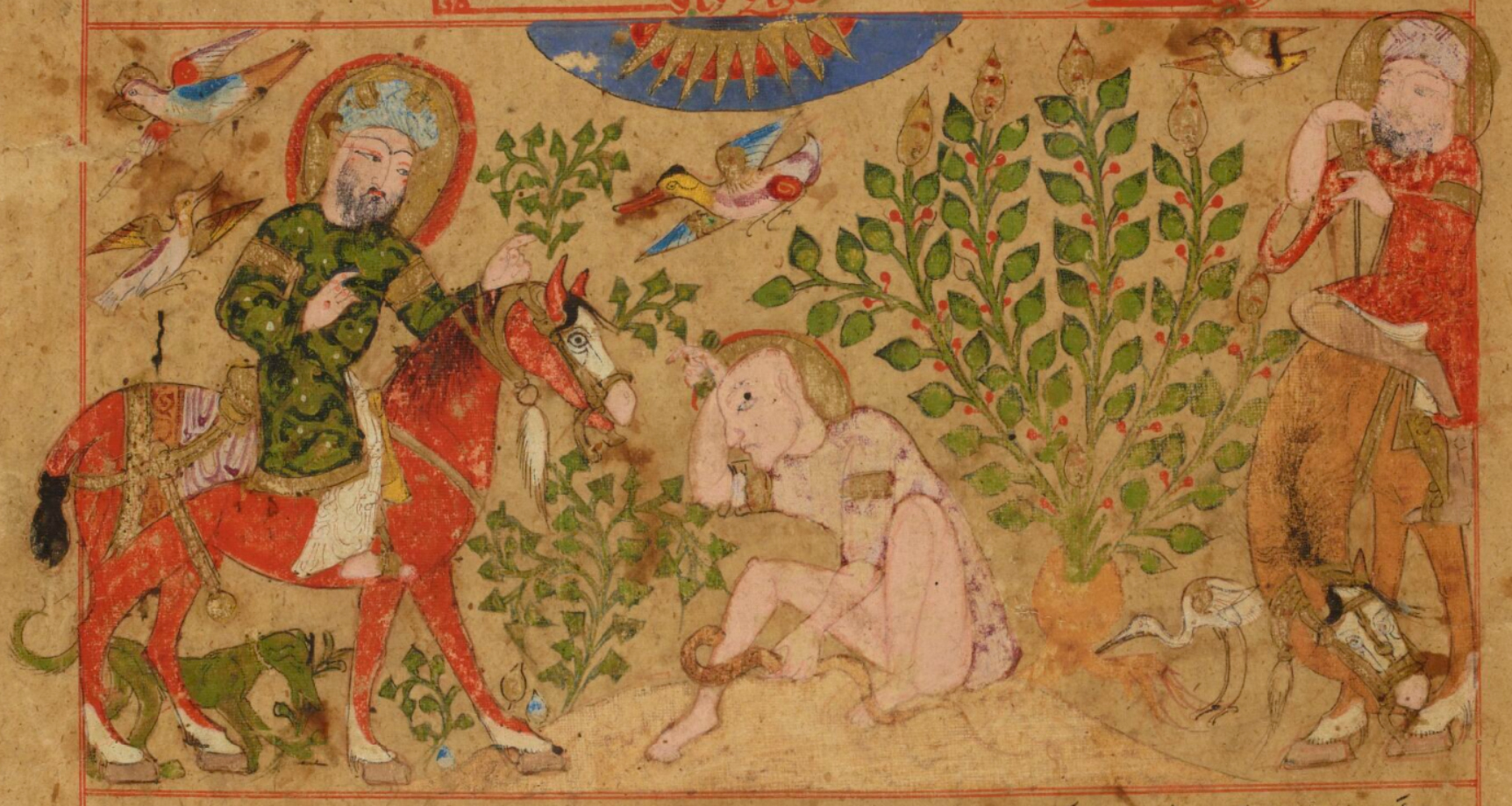
Andromachus the Elder on horseback, questioning a patient who has received a snake bite. Kitâb al-Diryâq ("The Book of Theriac"), 1198-1199, Syria.

Theriac or theriaca is a medical concoction originally labelled by the Greeks in the 1st century AD and widely adopted in the ancient world as far away as Persia, China and India via the trading links of the Silk Route. It was an alexipharmic, or antidote for a variety of poisons and diseases. It was also considered a panacea, a term for which it could be used interchangeably: in the 16th century Adam Lonicer wrote that garlic was the rustic's theriac or Heal-All.

The word theriac comes from the Greek term θηριακή (thēriakē), a feminine adjective signifying "pertaining to animals", from θηρίον (thērion), "wild animal, beast". The ancient bestiaries included information—often fanciful—about dangerous beasts and their bites. When cane sugar was an exotic Eastern commodity, the English recommended the sugar-based treacle as an antidote against poison, originally applied as a salve. By extension, treacle could be applied to any healing property: in the Middle Ages the "treacle well" at Binsey was a place of pilgrimage due to the supposed healing properties of its water.

Historian Norman Cantor observes that the remedy's supposed effect followed the homeopathic principle of "the hair of the dog", whereby a concoction containing some of the poisonous (it was thought) flesh of the serpent would be a sovereign remedy against the creature's venom: in The Book of Holy Medicines, Henry of Grosmont, 1st Duke of Lancaster, wrote that "the treacle is made of poison so that it can destroy other poisons". Another rationale for including snake flesh was the widespread belief that snakes contained an antidote to protect themselves against being poisoned by their own venom. Thinking by analogy, Henry Grosmont also thought of theriac as a moral curative, the medicine "to make a man reject the poisonous sin which has entered into his soul". Because the plague, most notably the Black Death, was believed to have been sent by God as a punishment for sin and had its origins in pestilential serpents that poisoned the rivers, theriac was a particularly appropriate remedy or therapeutic. By contrast, Christiane Fabbri argues that theriac, which very frequently contained opium, actually did have palliative effect against pain and reduced coughing and diarrhea.

== History ==
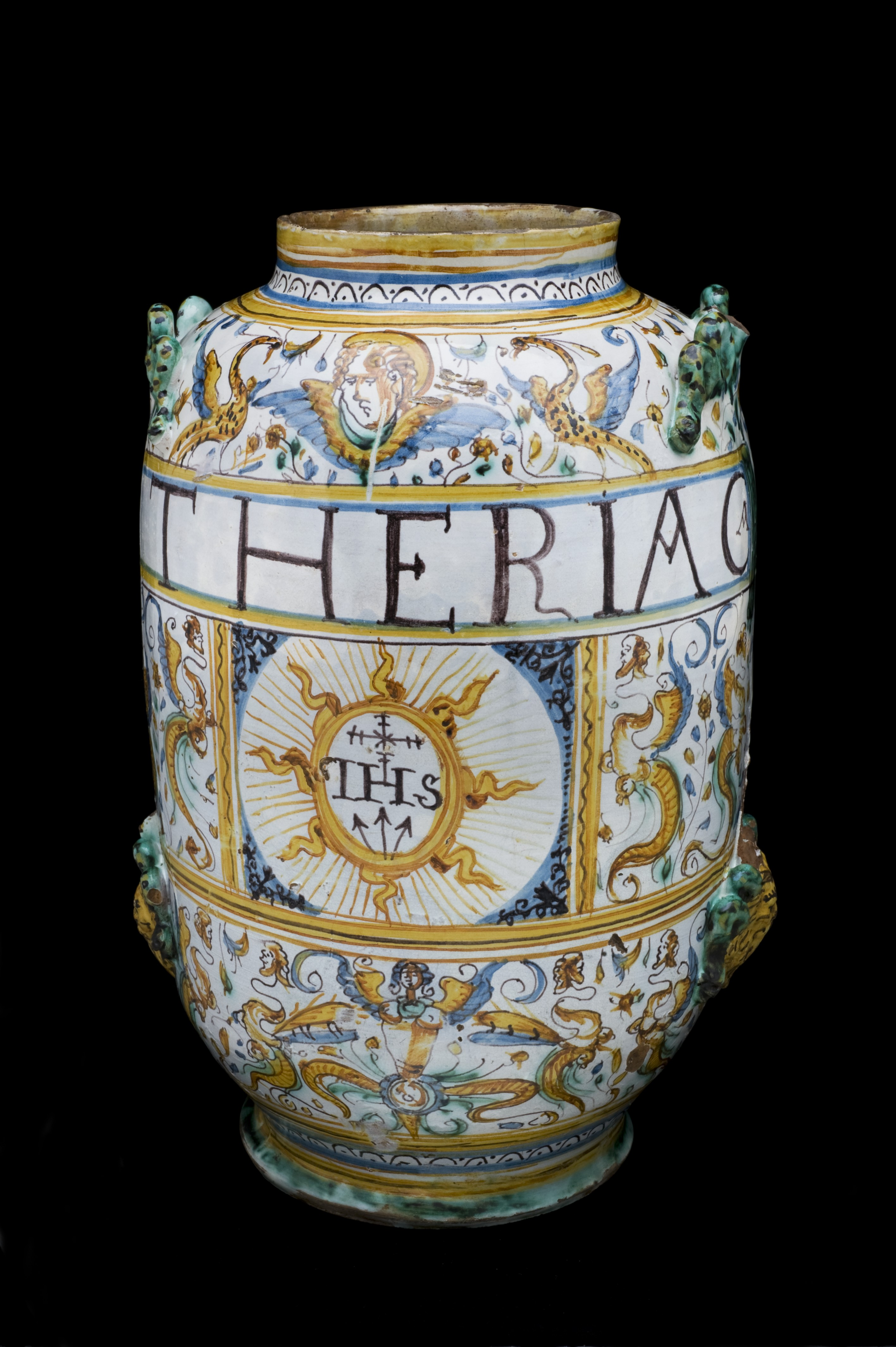
Albarello vase for theriac, 1641

According to legends, the history of theriac begins with the king Mithridates VI of Pontus who experimented with poisons and antidotes on his prisoners. His numerous toxicity experiments eventually led him to declare that he had discovered an antidote for every venomous reptile and poisonous substance. He mixed all the effective antidotes into a single one, mithridatium or mithridate. Mithridate contained opium, myrrh, saffron, ginger, cinnamon and castor, along with some forty other ingredients. When the Romans defeated him, his medical notes fell into their hands and Roman medici began to use them. Emperor Nero's physician Andromachus improved upon mithridatum by bringing the total number of ingredients to sixty-four, including viper's flesh, a mashed decoction of which, first roasted then well aged, proved the most constant ingredient. Lise Manniche, however, links the origins of theriac to the ancient Egyptian kyphi recipe, which was also used medicinally.

Greek physician Galen devoted a whole book, Theriaké, to theriac, documenting many notable theriacs such as Philonium. One of his patients, Roman emperor Marcus Aurelius, took it on a regular basis.

In 667, ambassadors from Rûm presented the Emperor Gaozong of the Tang dynasty in China with a theriac. The Chinese observed that it contained the gall of swine, was dark red in colour and the foreigners seemed to respect it greatly. The Tang pharmacologist Su Kung noted that it had proved its usefulness against "the hundred ailments". Whether this panacea contained the traditional ingredients such as opium, myrrh and hemp, is not known.

In the Middle East, theriac was known as Tiryaq, and makers of it were known as Tiryaqi.

In medieval London, the preparation arrived on galleys from the Mediterranean, under the watchful eye of the Worshipful Company of Grocers. Theriac, the most expensive of medicaments, was called Venice treacle by the English apothecaries.

At the time of the Black Death in the mid 14th century, Gentile da Foligno, who died of the plague in June 1348, recommended in his plague treatise that the theriac should have been aged at least a year. Children should not ingest it, he thought, but have it rubbed on them in a salve.

In 1669, the famous French apothecary, Moyse Charas, published the formula for theriac, seeking to break the monopoly held by the Venetians at that time on the medication, thereby opening up the transfer of medical information.

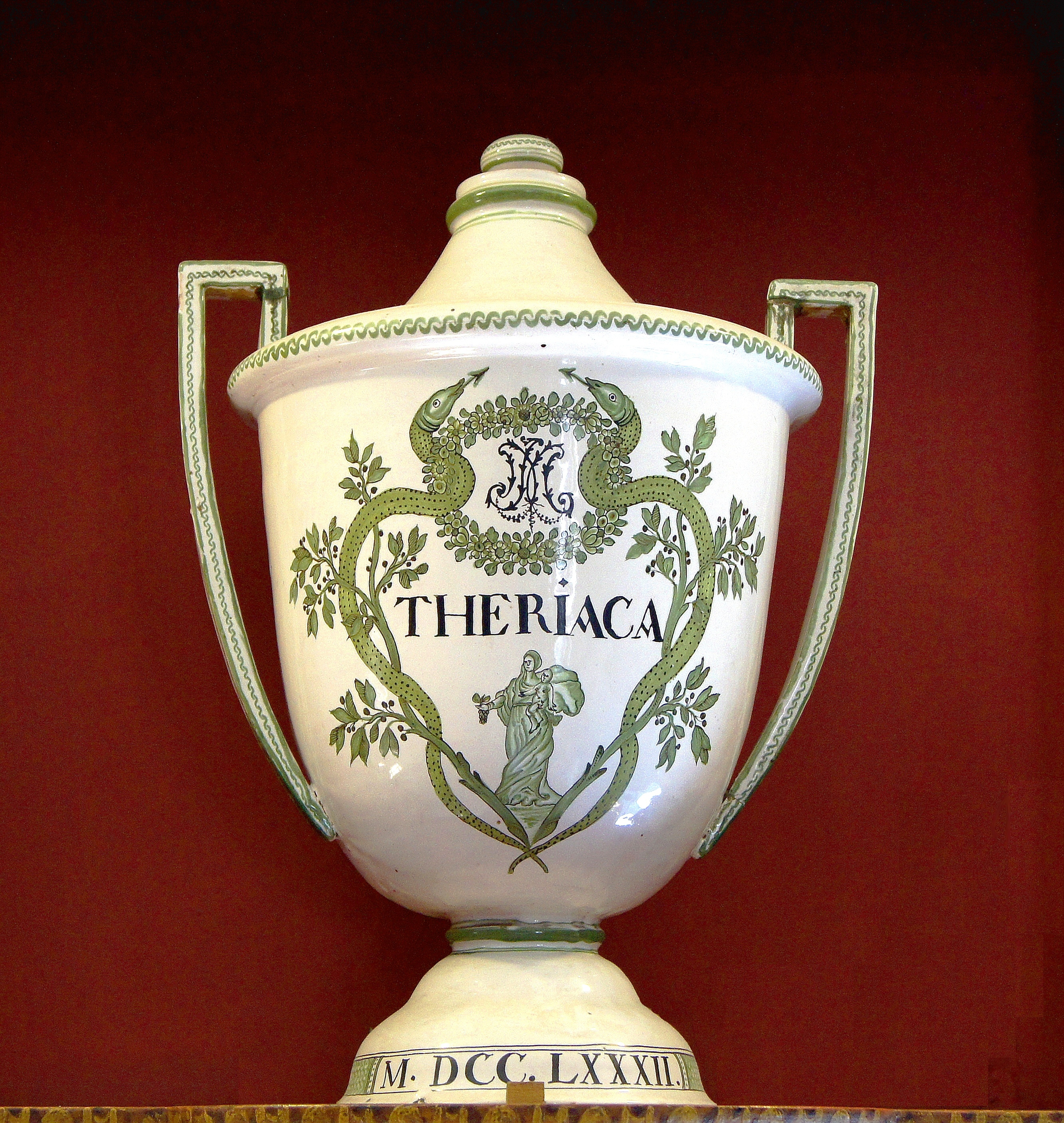
Theriac pot dated 1782 from the Hospices de Beaune

== Production ==
The production of a proper theriac took months with all the collection and fermentation of herbs and other ingredients. It was supposed to be left to mature for years. As a result, it was also expensive and hence available only for the rich.

According to the commentary on Exodus, Ki Tisa, the Spanish scholar Moses ben Nachman lists the ingredients of theriac as leaven, honey, flesh of wild beasts and reptiles, dried scorpion and viper.

According to Galen, theriac reached its greatest potency six years after preparation and kept its virtues for 40 years. It was therefore good practice to make large batches; in 1712, 150 kg of theriac was prepared at one session in Maastricht in the Netherlands.

By the time of the Renaissance, the making of theriac had become an official ceremony, especially in Italy. In Italy, pharmacists sold it as late as 1930.

== Theriaca Andromachi Senioris ==
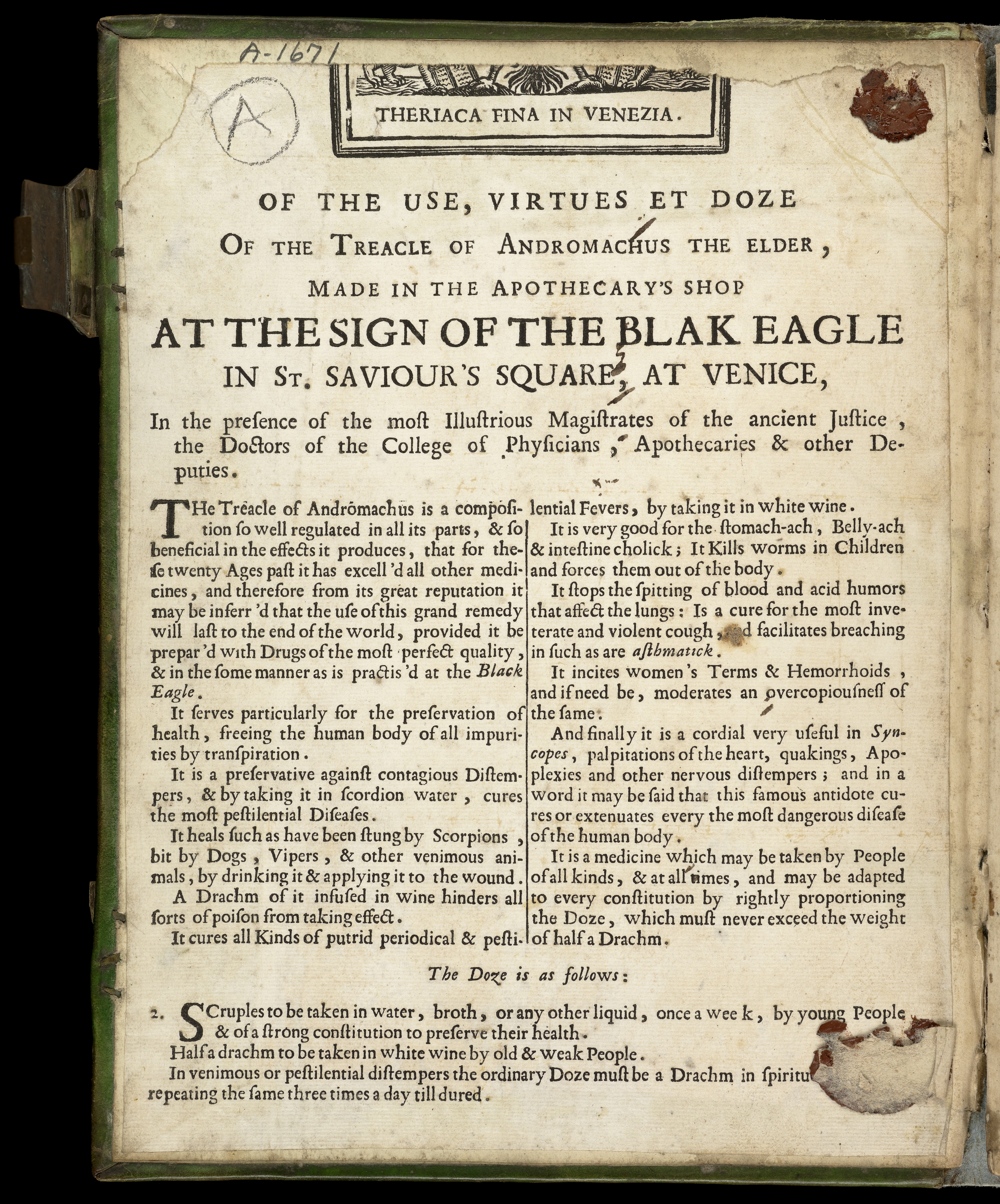
Uses and dosing instructions in an advertisement for Venice Treacle, c. 18th century

Theriaca andromachi or "Venice Treacle" contained 64 ingredients. In addition to viper flesh and opium, it included cinnamon, agarikon and gum arabic. The ingredients were pulverized and reduced to an electuary with honey.

The following ingredients for the theriac were taken from the Amsterdammer Apotheek (1683) and translated from the old Latin names into the Latin names now used where possible. Not all ingredients are known, and identifications and assignments below are tentative.

Roots: Iris, Balsamorhiza deltoidea, Potentilla reptans (creeping cinquefoil), Rheum rhabarbarum (garden rhubarb), Zingiber officinale, Ulmus × hollandica 'Angustifolia' odorata, Gentiana, Meum athamanticum (spignel), Valeriana, Corydalis cava (hollowroot), glycyrrhiza

Stems and barks: Cinnamomum verum (cinnamon), Cinnamomum aromaticum (cassia)

Leaves: Teucrium scordium (water germander), Fraxinus excelsior, Clinopodium calamintha (lesser calamint), Marrubium vulgare (white or common horehound), Cymbopogon citratus (West-Indian lemongrass), Teucrium chamaedrys (wall germander), Cupressaceae, Laurus nobilis (bay laurel), Teucrium montanum (mountain germander), Cytinus hypocistis

Flowers: Rosa, Crocus sativus, Lavandula stoechas (French lavender), Lavandula angustifolia (common or English lavender), Centaurea minoris (common centaury)

Fruits and seeds: Brassica napus (rapeseed), Petroselinum (parsley), Nigella sativa, Pimpinella anisum (anise), Elettaria cardamomum, Foeniculum vulgare (fennel), Hypericum perforatum (St. John's wort), seseli, thlaspi, Daucus carota (carrot), Piper nigrum (black pepper), Piper longum (long pepper), Juniperus (juniper), Syzygium aromaticum (clove), Canary Island wine, Agaricus fruiting bodies

Gums, oils and resins: Acaciae (acacia), Styrax benzoin, Gummi arabicum, Sagapeni (wax of an unknown tree, possibly some kind of Ferula), Gummi Opopanax chironium, Gummi Ferula foetida, Commiphora (myrrh), incense, Turpentine from Cyprus, oil from Myristica fragans (nutmeg), Papaver somniverum latex (opium).

Animal parts and products: Castoreum, Trochisci Viperarum, Narbonne white honey

Mineral substances: Boli armen. verae, Chalciditis (copper salts), Dead Sea bitumen

== See also ==
- Garlic in folk medicine—Also considered a cure-all
- Mithridate
