= Rheus Agathopus =

Companion of Ignatius of Antioch

Rheus Agathopus or Rheius Agathopus was a companion of Ignatius of Antioch and a second century deacon in Syria. He was mentioned along with Philo of Cilicia in two of his epistles, in the epistle to the Smyrneans and Philadelphians. Rheus Agathopus and Philo of Cilicia accompanied Ignatius on his journey to Rome, and the book Martyrium Ignatii has been attributed to him, along with Philo of Cilicia, though even scholars who believe it is authentic often believe that it has been likely largely interpolated. Rheus Agathopus joined Ignatius in Troas.
