= Florinus (Gnostic) =

Florinus was a 2nd-century Roman presbyter. In his later years, he espoused certain Gnostic views. He lost his office after teaching certain doctrines that were deemed heretical. Florinus was mentioned by Irenaeus, and was apparently slightly older than him. Just like Irenaeus, Florinus was perhaps once a disciple of Polycarp, but he was later influenced by Valentinians. Eusebius claimed that Florinus taught dualism and that God is the author of evil; though most scholars accept Eusebius' statement, some scholars have suggested that Eusebius was mistaken on Florinus' view of dualism. Florinus also taught Monarchianism. Irenaeus wrote a work against Florinus and he was later excommunicated, likely by Pope Victor I.

== See also ==
- Blastus
