= Phylo =

Phylo may refer to:

- Phylo (Odyssey), a character in the Odyssey
- Phylo (annelid), a genus of worms
- Phylo (video game), 2010

== See also ==
- Phyllo, a pastry dough
- Philo (disambiguation)
