= Athenodoros (physician) =

Ancient Greek physician

Athenodoros (Ancient Greek: Ἀθηνόδωρος) was a physician of ancient Greece. He lived in the first century CE or the beginning of the second.

He was probably a contemporary of the writer Plutarch, by whom the first book of his treatise, On Epidemic Diseases (Ἐπιδήμια), is quoted. In this work, Athenodoros proposes that diseases could and had come into existence within recent memory, and says that both elephantiasis and rabies originated in the time of the physician Asclepiades of Bithynia, which was a century before Athenodoros's own time. This view was used by later writers to reject and contrast with that of Philo of Hyampolis, who proposed that these diseases were newer still.
