= Martyrium Ignatii =

Alleged account of the death of St. Ignatius

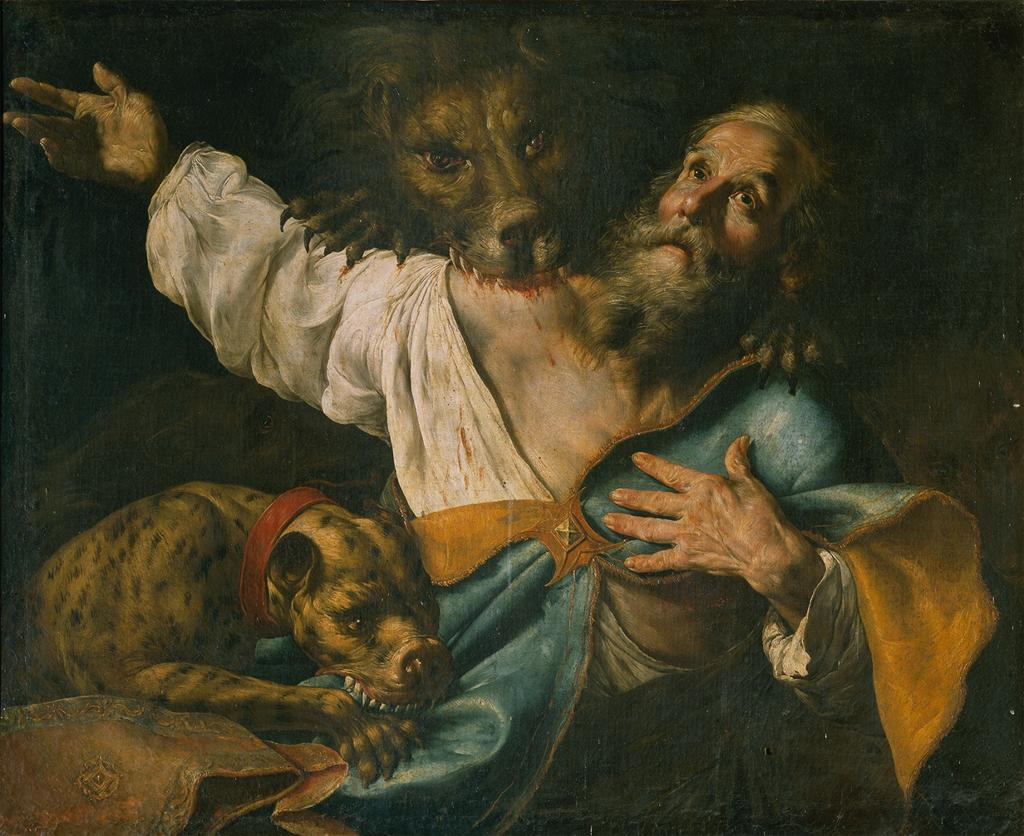
Ignatius being eaten by lions.

Martyrium Ignatii is a work that claims to be an eye witness of the events leading up to his death and the martyrdom of Saint Ignatius.

== Authorship ==
Its most reliable manuscript is the 10th-century Codex Colbertinus (Paris), in which the Martyrium closes the collection. The Martyrium presents the confrontation of the bishop Ignatius with Trajan at Antioch, a familiar trope of Acts of the martyrs, and many details of the long, partly overland voyage to Rome. The writer has been said to be a deacon in Tarsus named Philo and Rheus Agathopus. However, even scholars who accept the book as authentic believe that it has been heavily edited by later authors.

== Content ==
The book tells the story of Ignatius' death and the events leading up to his death, the book also implies that Ignatius was one of the children Christ held in Matt. 18:2.
