= Frank Filo =

American soccer player

Personal information
- Date of birth: December 28, 1971 (age 54)
- Place of birth: Fort Wayne, Indiana, U.S.
- Height: 5 ft 9 in (1.75 m)
- Position: Defender

Youth career
- Arkansas-Little Rock Trojans

Senior career*
Years	Team	Apps	(Gls)
1994	Arkansas A's		
1995	Dallas Lightning		
1995–2004	Dallas Sidekicks (indoor)	206	(33)
1997–1998	Cleveland Crunch (indoor)	17	(2)
- * Club domestic league appearances and goals

Frank Filo (born December 28, 1971) is an American retired soccer defender who spent most of his career with the Dallas Sidekicks. He also played two seasons in the USISL and part of one season with the Cleveland Crunch in the National Professional Soccer League.

Filo attended Arkansas-Little Rock University. In 1994, he played for the Arkansas A's of the USISL. In 1995, he played for the Dallas Lightning of the USISL. On June 22, 1995, he signed with the Dallas Sidekicks of the Continental Indoor Soccer League. He would remain with the Sidekicks until 2004. During his years with Dallas, the team played in the CISL, World Indoor Soccer League, and second Major Indoor Soccer League. On October 24, 1997, he signed a fifteen-day contract with the Cleveland Crunch in the National Professional Soccer League. The Crunch extended his contract until January 1998 when they released him. He is currently retired from soccer and lives in Murphy, Texas, with his wife, Donna, and two sons.
