= Philo of Hyampolis =

Ancient Greek physician

Philo (Ancient Greek: Φίλων) of Hyampolis was a physician of ancient Greece. He probably lived in the first century CE or the beginning of the second. There were seemingly several physicians with this name around this time, and it is challenging to tell them apart. He may be the same person as Philo of Tarsus.

He is mentioned among several others by the physician and medical writer Galen as belonging to the Methodic school, and must have lived some time in or after the first century BCE.

There was a physician with this name who was the contemporary of the writer Plutarch, whom he introduces in his Symposiacs. This Philo was of the opinion that the diseases elephantiasis and rabies and originated in his own lifetime, and this misapprehension is contrasted with the physician Athenodoros, who was of the opinion these were much older, and must have originated a century beforehand.

A physician of this name is also mentioned by Epiphanius of Salamis in his Panarion, about whom nothing else is known.
