= Philo Miner Lonsbury =

American politician

Member of the Michigan House of Representatives from the Osceola County district
- In office January 1, 1895 – 1896

Personal details
- Born: March 3, 1835 Rochester, New York, US
- Died: February 3, 1922 (aged 86) Seattle, Washington, US
- Party: Republican
- Spouse: Eliza
- Children: 6
- Education: Michigan Union College

Military service
- Allegiance: United States Army
- Years of service: 1862-1865
- Rank: Sergeant
- Battles/wars: American Civil War

Philo Miner Lonsbury (March 3, 1835 – February 3, 1922) was a Michigan politician and soldier.

== Early life ==
Lonsbury was born on March 3, 1835, in Rochester, New York. In 1837, his family moved to Cambridge Township, Michigan.

== Personal life ==
Lonsbury married Eliza in 1865 and together they had six children.

== Military career ==
Lonsbury enlisted to the army on August 1, 1862. When he enlisted, he was a Corporal. He enlisted in Company E of the Michigan 17th Infantry Regiment on August 19, 1862. Through his military career, he was promoted to Sergeant. On May 12, 1864, Lonsbury was taken prisoner at the Spotsylvania Court House. He was then transferred to Andersonville, Georgia, and Florence, South Carolina, before he escaped from Confederate imprisonment on February 22, 1865.

== Political career ==
Lonsbury was a Republican. He was elected to the Michigan House of Representatives on November 6, 1894. He was sworn in on January 2, 1895, and served until 1896.

== Death ==
Lonsbury died on February 3, 1922, in Seattle, Washington.
