= Andromachus (physician) =

Andromachus (Greek: Ἀνδρόμαχος; 1st century) was the name of two Greek physicians, father and son, who lived in the time of Nero.

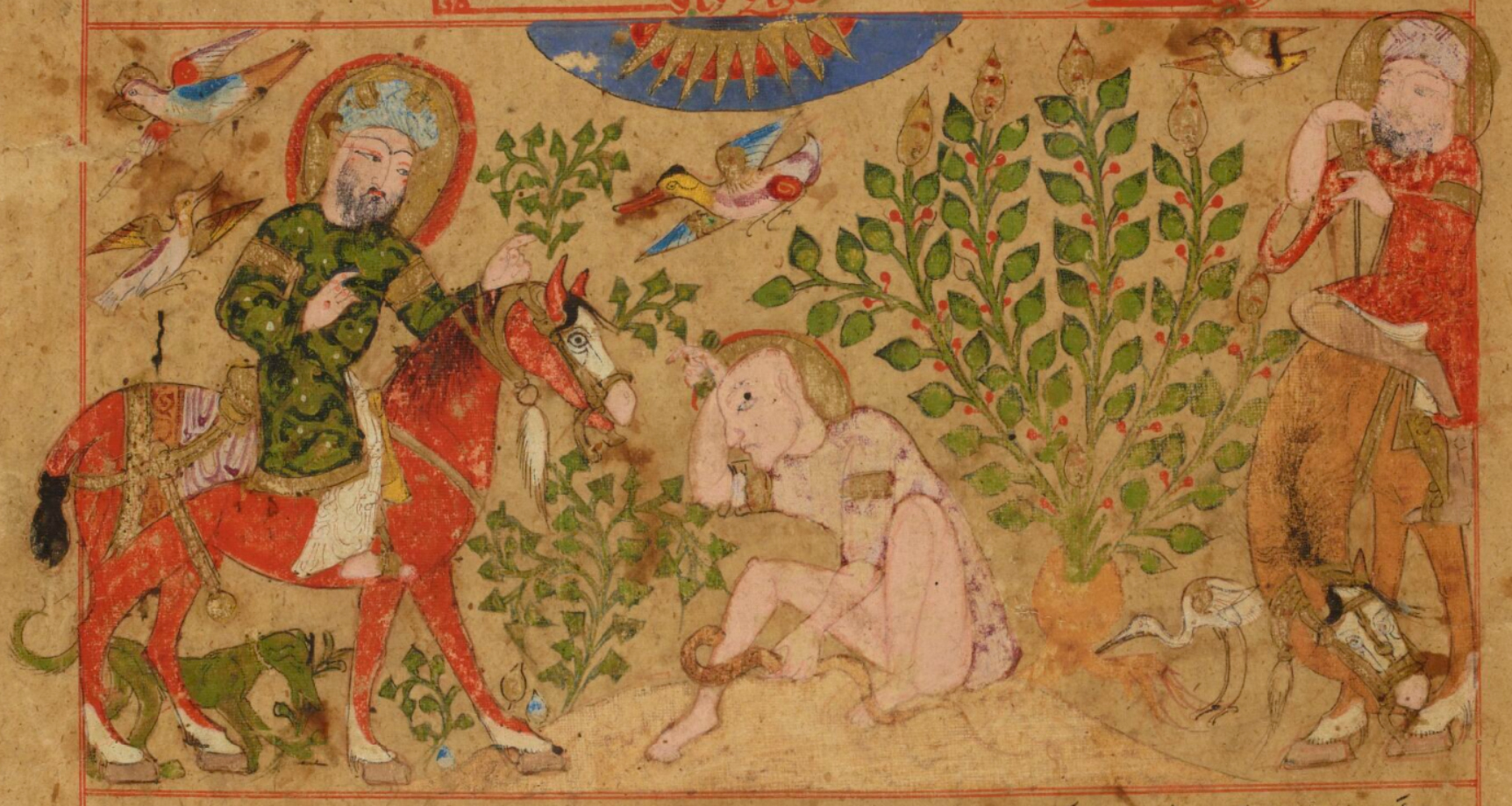
Andromachus the Elder on horseback, questioning a patient who has received a snake bite. Kitab al-Dariyak, 1198–1199, Syria.

- Andromachus the Elder, was born in Crete, and was physician to Nero, 54–68 AD. He is principally celebrated for having been the first person on whom the title of "Archiater" is known to have been conferred, After realizing the anti-toxic effects of snake meat, Andromachus made Faroug antidote with changes in the previous formulas (Mithridate). which was a famous compound medicine and antidote, named after him, and long enjoyed a great reputation. Andromachus wrote directions for making this mixture in a Greek elegiac poem, consisting of 174 lines, and dedicated to Nero. Galen inserted it in two of his works, and says that Andromachus chose this form as being more easily remembered than prose, and less likely to be altered. Saladino d'Ascoli, a 15th-century Italian physician, insists that indeed Andromachus, and not Galen (as asserted in the Antidotarium Nicolai) was the creator of this theriac. Some persons suppose him to be the author of a work on pharmacy, but this is generally attributed to his son, Andromachus the Younger.
- Andromachus the Younger, the son of Andromachus the Elder, may also have been an imperial physician. Nothing is known of the events of his life, but he is generally supposed to have been the author of a work on pharmacy in three books, which is quoted very frequently and with approbation by Galen, but of which only a few fragments remain.

== See also ==
- Electuary

== Sources ==
- Vivian Nutton, (2004), Ancient Medicine, pages 177–8. Routledge
