= Philo of Tarsus =

Ancient Greek physician

Philo (Ancient Greek: Φίλων) of Tarsus in Cilicia was a physician and pharmacologist of ancient Greece. He probably lived in or before the first century CE, as the physician and medical writer Galen speaks of him as having lived sometime before his own age.

Philo was the author of a celebrated theriac, or antidote for poison, called "Philonium" (Φιλώνειον) after his name. He described the composition of this medicine in a short, enigmatic Greek poem, preserved by Galen, who gave an explanation of this in his own writings. Some sources alternately describe this as an analgesic, not an antidote. The practice of giving recipes in verse was intended to make them easier to memorize, as medical knowledge was primarily passed on via oral tradition.

Philonium was an herbal remedy consisting of spikenard, henbane, pyrethrum, euphorbia, and saffron, and possibly also honey and opium, and has no significant antidote effect by the standards of modern medicine.

This antidote is frequently mentioned by ancient medical writers, for example by Galen, Aretaeus of Cappadocia, Paul of Aegina, Oribasius, Aëtius of Amida, Joannes Actuarius, Marcellus Empiricus, Alexander of Tralles, Nicolaus Myrepsus, and Avicenna.

There were seemingly several physicians with this name around this time, and it is challenging to tell them apart. The historian and medical writer Kurt Polycarp Joachim Sprengel believed this Philo to have been the same person as the grammarian Philo of Byblos, but this is not a widely supported conjecture. He may be the same person as Philo of Hyampolis. He may perhaps be the physician quoted by Celsus.
