= Philo of Cilicia =

Philo of Cilicia (Greek: Φίλων) was a second-century deacon who served in Tarsus, he was mentioned by Ignatius of Antioch in his letters to the Smyrneans and Philadelphians. He accompanied Ignatius of Antioch during his journey to Rome.

The book Martyrium Ignatii which tells the story of Ignatius' martyrdom, was perhaps written by Philo along with Rheus Agathopus.
