= Stefania Filo Speziale =

Italian architect (1905–1988)

- Born: 1905; Naples
- Died: 1988 (aged 82–83); Naples, Italy
- Education: Regio istituto superiore di architettura in Naples
- Occupation: Architect
- Buildings: Metropolitan Cinema, Palazzo Della Morte, Cattolica Assicurazioni skyscraper

Stefania Filo Speziale (1905–1988) was an Italian architect, the first woman to graduate from an architecture program in Naples, Italy.

She was born in Naples and graduated from the Regio istituto superiore di architettura in Naples in 1932. Filo Speziale worked as an assistant to professor Marcello Canino in the Faculty of Architecture at the University of Naples. She became a full professor in 1970.

During the 1930s, she was an architect at the Mostra d'Oltremare, designing several pavilions. Next, she worked on private residences and public housing in Naples. She was a member of the National Institute of Urban Design in 1945. She designed the Metropolitan Cinema in Naples in 1948. She worked with two young architects Carlo Chiurazzi and Giorgio di Simone starting in 1954; they began as assistants but later shared an office with her. Their best work includes the Palazzo Della Morte and the Cattolica Assicurazioni skyscraper.

She died in Naples in 1988; Filo Speziale destroyed her entire archive before her death.
