= Mithridate =

Semi-mythical remedy

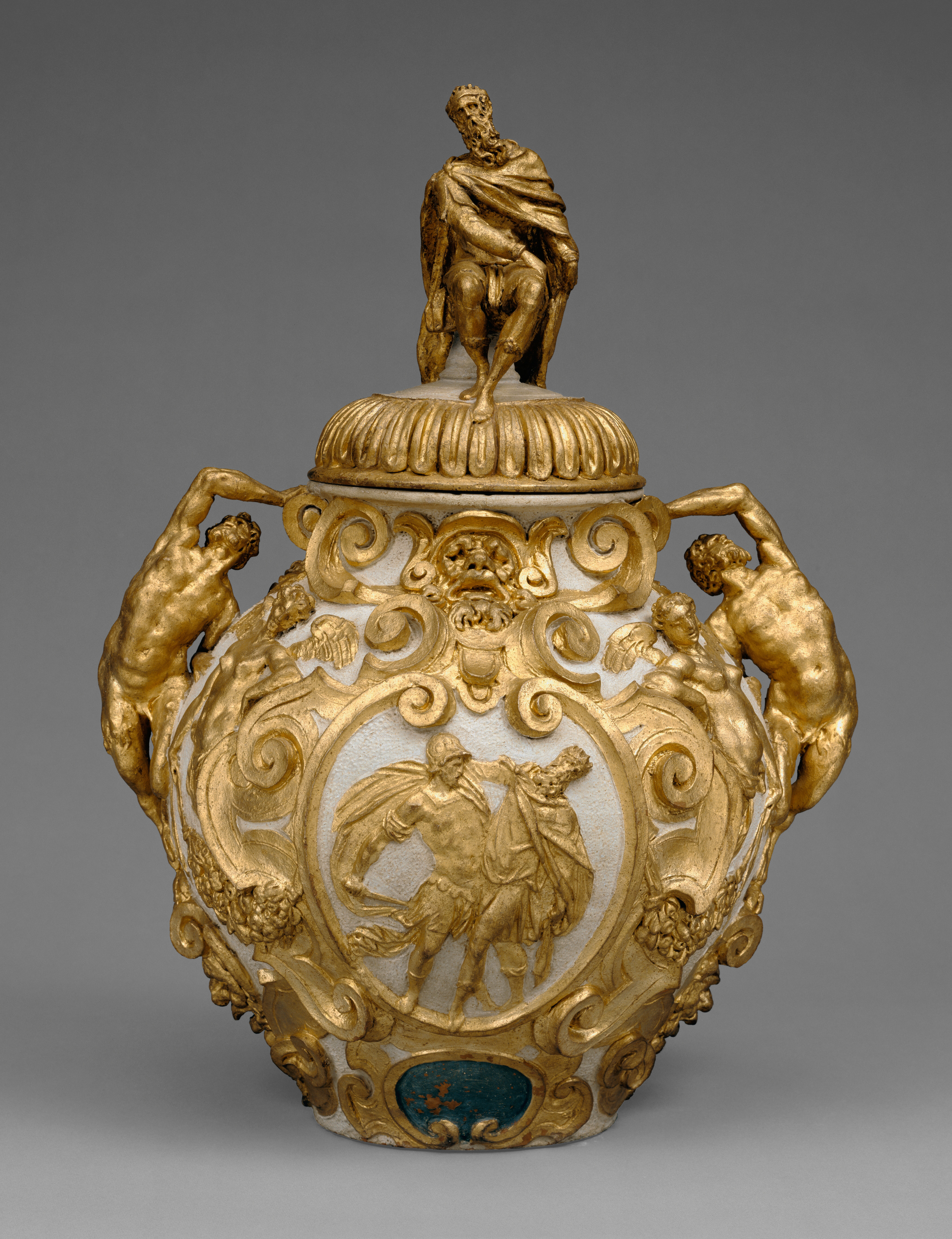
Elaborately gilded drug jar for storing mithridate. By Annibale Fontana, about 1580–1590.

Mithridate, also known as mithridatium, mithridatum, mithridaticum, Confectio Damocratis, or Damocrates's Confection is a semi-mythical remedy with as many as 65 ingredients, used as an antidote for poisoning, and said to have been created by Mithridates VI Eupator of Pontus in the 1st century BC. It was one of the most complex and highly sought-after drugs during the Middle Ages and the Renaissance, particularly in Italy and France, where it was in continual use for centuries. An updated recipe called theriac (Theriacum Andromachi) was known well into the 19th century.

Mithridate takes its name from its inventor, Mithridates VI, king of the ancient Anatolian Kingdom of Pontus (134 to 63 BC), who is said to have so fortified his body against poisons with antidotes and preservatives that when he tried to kill himself, he could not find any poison that would have an effect, and, according to some legends, had to ask a soldier to run him through with a sword. The recipe for the reputed antidote was found in his cabinet, written with his own hand, and was carried to Rome by Pompey. It was translated into Latin by Pompey's freedman Lenaeus, and later improved upon by Nero's physician Andromachus and Marcus Aurelius' physician Galen. It likely underwent considerable alterations since the time of Mithridates. After realizing the anti-toxic effects of snake meat, Andromachus made Faroug antidote with changes in the previous formulas.

In the Middle Ages, mithridate was also used as part of a regimen to ward off potential threats of plague. According to Simon Kellwaye (1593), one should "take a great Onyon, make a hole in the myddle of him, then fill the place with Mitridat or Triacle, and some leaues of Rue". Until as late as 1786, physicians in London were officially prescribing mithridate. According to historian Christopher Hill, Oliver Cromwell took a large dose of mithridate as a precaution against the plague and found it cured his acne.

The term mithridate has come to refer to any generally all-purpose antidote.

== Origins ==
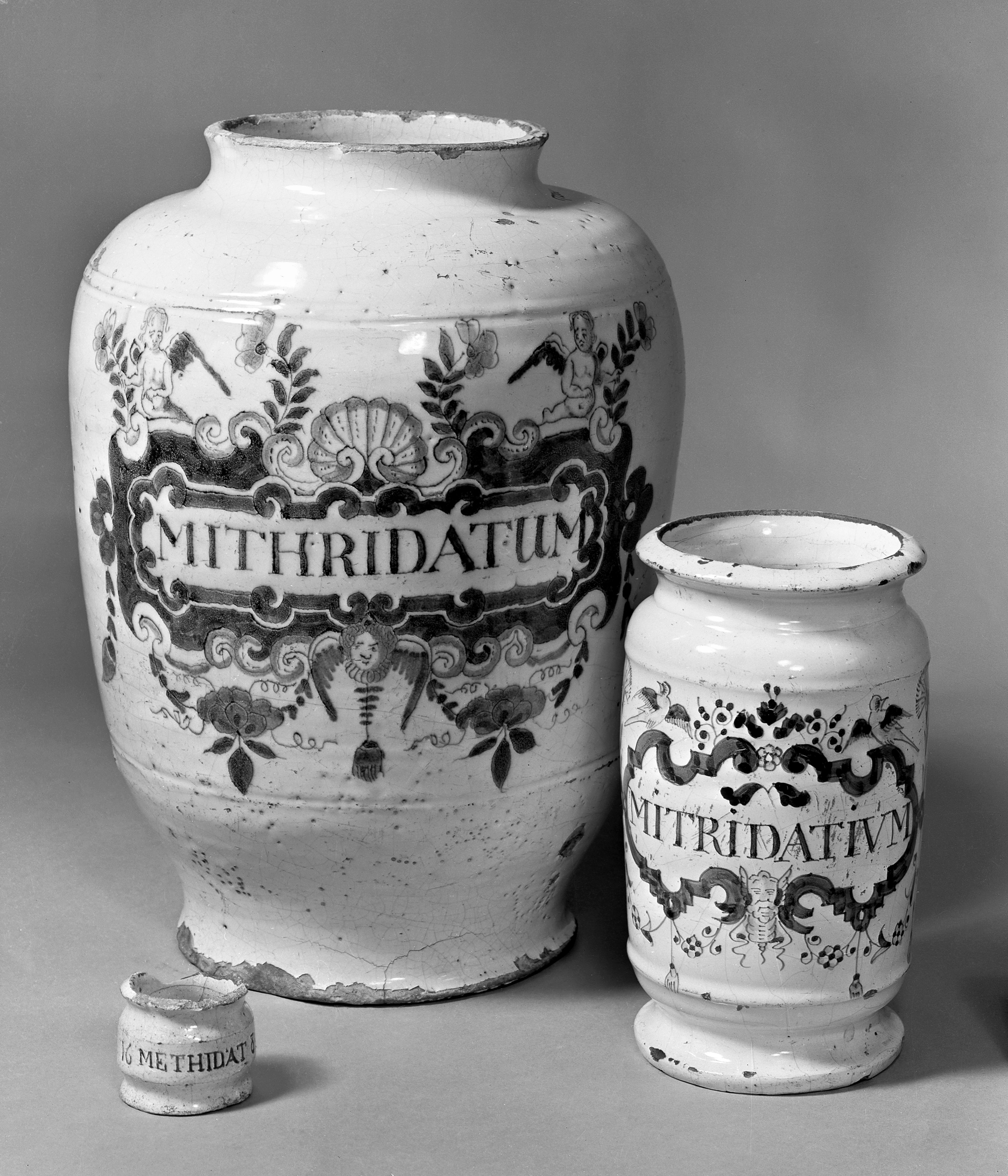
Three drug jars for mithridatum

Mithridates' father was assassinated by poisoning, according to some at his mother's orders. After this, Mithridates's mother held regency over Pontus until a male heir was of age. Mithridates was in competition with another brother, whom his mother favored, for the throne. Supposedly during his youth he began to suspect plots against him at his mother's orders and was aware of her likely connection with his father's death. He then, supposedly, began to notice pains during his meals, and suspected his mother had ordered small amounts of poison to be added to his food in order to cause his health to deteriorate while avoiding notice of intent to kill him slowly. After other assassination attempts, he fled into the wilderness.

While in the wild it is said that he began consuming non-lethal levels of poisons and mixing many into a remedy to make him immune to many poisons.

In keeping with most medical practices of his era, Mithridates' anti-poison routines included a religious component supervised by Agari, or Scythian shamans who never left his side.

== Formulation ==
Aulus Cornelius Celsus details one version of the antidote in De Medicina (ca. AD 30). A recent translation is as follows: "But the most famous antidote is that of Mithridates, which that king is said to have taken daily and by it to have rendered his body safe against danger from poison". It contained:

- costmary, 1–66 grams
- sweet flag, 20 grams
- hypericum, 8 grams
- Natural gum, 8 grams
- sagapenum, 8 grams
- acacia juice, 8 grams
- Illyrian iris (probably I. germanica), 8 grams
- cardamom, 8 grams
- anise, 12 grams
- Gallic nard (Valeriana italica), 16 grams
- gentian root, 16 grams
- dried rose leaves, 16 grams
- poppy-tears (Papaver rhoeas, a wild poppy with low opiate content), 17 grams
- parsley, 17 grams
- cassia, 20–66 grams
- saxifrage, 20–66 grams
- darnel, 20–66 grams
- long pepper, 20–66 grams
- storax, 21 grams
- castoreum, 24 grams
- frankincense, 24 grams
- hypocistis juice, 24 grams
- myrrh, 24 grams
- opopanax, 24 grams
- malabathrum leaves, 24 grams
- flower of round rush, 24–66 grams
- turpentine-resin, 24–66 grams
- galbanum, 24–66 grams
- Cretan carrot seeds, 24–66 grams
- nard, 25 grams
- opobalsam, 25 grams
- shepherd's purse, 25 grams
- rhubarb root, 28 grams
- saffron, 29 grams
- ginger, 29 grams
- cinnamon, 29 grams

The ingredients are then "pounded and taken up in honey. Against poisoning, a piece the size of an almond is given in wine. In other affections an amount corresponding in size to an Egyptian bean is sufficient." Of these ingredients, Illyrian iris, darnel, and rhubarb were not commonly found in other versions of the antidote. However, Celsus' formulation, written 100 years after the death of Mithridates, was one of the first published. Galen called the antidote "theriac" and presented versions by Aelius (used by Julius Caesar), Andromachus (physician to Nero), Antipater, Nicostratus, and Damocratis. The Andromachus formulation closely resembles that of Celsus.

The manufacture of antidotes called mithridate or theriac (English "treacle") continued into the nineteenth century. Ephraim Chambers, in his 1728 Cyclopaedia, says "Mithridate is one of the capital Medicines in the Apothecaries Shops, being composed of a vast Number of Drugs, as Opium, Myrrh, Agaric, Saffron, Ginger, Cinnamon, Spikenard, Frankincense, Castor, Pepper, Gentian, &c. It is accounted a Cordial, Opiate, Sudorific, and Alexipharmic". Petrus Andreas Matthiolus considered it more effectual against poisons than Venice treacle, and easier to make. Late versions of the antidote incorporated dried blood or the dried flesh of lizards or vipers or Malabathrum.

== Criticism ==
Pliny (Natural History, XXIX.24–25, ca. AD 77) was skeptical of mithridate and other such theriacs (panacea potions), with their numerous ingredients:

The Mithridatic antidote is composed of fifty-four ingredients, no two of them having the same weight, while of some is prescribed one sixtieth part of one denarius. Which of the gods, in the name of Truth, fixed these absurd proportions? No human brain could have been sharp enough. It is plainly a showy parade of the art, and a colossal boast of science.

== In literature ==
In A. E. Housman's collection of poetry titled A Shropshire Lad published in 1896, there is a poem about King Mithridates and his antidote's amazing abilities:

There was a king reigned in the East:
There, when kings will sit to feast,
They get their fill before they think
With poisoned meat and poisoned drink.
He gathered all that springs to birth
From the many-venomed earth;
First a little, thence to more,
He sampled all her killing store;
And easy, smiling, seasoned sound,
Sate the king when healths went round.
They put arsenic in his meat
And stared aghast to watch him eat;
They poured strychnine in his cup
And shook to see him drink it up:
They shook, they stared as white's their shirt:
Them it was their poison hurt.
—I tell the tale that I heard told.
Mithridates, he died old.^{[6]}

In the Diary of Samuel Pepys, entry for 9 April 1664; Pepys writes at the end of the day “by the help of mithridate slept very well” having been unwell the previous night and also having vomited during the day.

== See also ==
- Mithridatism
- Theriac
- Electuary
