= Seal of Cabuyao =

- Armiger: Cabuyao
- Adopted: August 14, 2013 (earlier versions in unknown year, 1992, and 1994)
- Motto: Lungsod ng Cabuyao (City of Cabuyao)

The Seal of Cabuyao is one of the official symbols of the city of Cabuyao.

== History ==
=== Spanish era ===
Seal of Tabuko

During the Spanish era, when Cabuyao was still known as Tabuko uses a symbol for registration with the municipal government. The symbol has a "TAB" monogram, the first three letters of Cabuyao's old name. It is seen in branding iron for livestock branding.

=== Seal until 1992 ===
From an undetermined point in history until 1992, the town of Cabuyao used a seal which features a church bell. The bell represents a Golden Church bell which is deemed an inseparable part of the town's history and serves as a reminder to its denizens. The design was the outcome of a seal designing competition during the administration of Councilor Carlito Alegre and his colleagues.

=== 1992–1994 ===
A competition for a new seal for Cabuyao was held. The design of Domingo Alconaba, a native painter of the then town of Cabuyao was chosen. It was adopted as the official seal by the virtue of Municipal Resolution No. 165-1993 which was authored by Municipal Council member, Dionisio S. Punongbayan. Alconaba's design featured the following elements:

- The Golden Churchbell – or the Kampanang Ginto a historical object of Cabuyao.
- Plants – represents agriculture
- Waves – represents Laguna de Bay and marine resources
- Two gears – represents industry, trade and engineering
- Building – located in the right portion of the seal which symbolizes commerce of the city.
- Little churchbells – located on both sides of the text "1571", the establishment year of Cabuyao, represents the 18 barangays which is part of the locale.

=== Before cityhood (1994–2013) ===
From 1994 until Cabuyao became a city, the seal used for the town was different from the one approved by the Office of the President through the National Historical Institute. The current seal which is being used by the City Government of Cabuyao is adapted from the old official seal of the then municipality of Cabuyao which was designed and envisioned by Domingo Alconaba, a native painter of the city. The design was chosen by the then Municipal Government during a seal making competition held in 1993. Through Municipal Resolution No. 070-2011 passed on May 18, 2011 and authored by Municipal Council member Ismael M. Hemedes, it was agreed upon by the Municipal Council of Cabuyao, to use the pre-cityhood seal until Cabuyao officially become a city.

=== 2013–present ===
Through City Resolution No. 2013-402 filed by Hemedes, and agreed upon by the council, the current seal was adopted on August 14, 2013. The seal was revised due to the result of the combined suggestions and ideas by members of the City Council, which they believe aligns to the city's current development at that time. The elements inside the circular band were placed inside a shield. The words "SAGISAG NG CABUYAO, LAGUNA" was replaced with "LUNGSOD NG CABUYAO" and "1571" was relocated to be placed inside the church bell. It was now occupied by "2012".
