= Consensus Patrum =

Theological principle

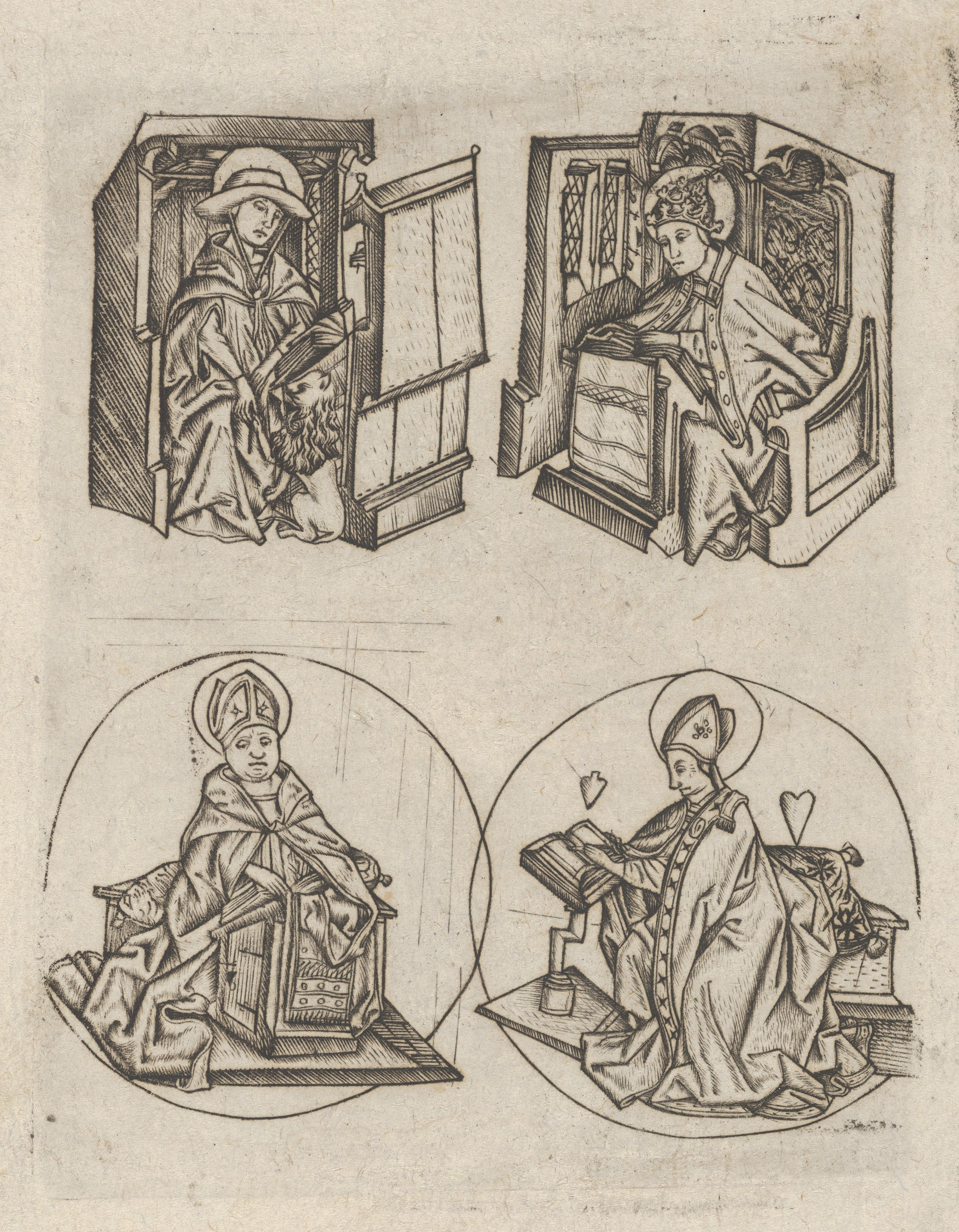
The Four Fathers of the Church by Israhel van Meckenem, depicting Saints Augustine, Ambrose, Gregory I, and Jerome.

Consensus Patrum (Latin for 'Consensus of the Fathers') is the principle that Christian doctrine should align with the common teaching of the Church Fathers. Formulated by Vincent of Lérins, it emphasizes universality, antiquity, and consensus as criteria for orthodoxy. It has played a key role in Ecumenical Councils, Scholasticism, and Reformation debates.

In Eastern Orthodoxy, Consensus Patrum remains central, guiding doctrine and biblical interpretation. The Catholic Church upholds patristic consensus, especially in Scripture interpretation, but acknowledges that individual Fathers are not infallible. Anglicanism values it as a middle ground between Catholicism and Protestantism. In contrast, most Protestant traditions prioritize sola scriptura, though some Reformers engaged with patristic writings.

Modern discussions question its application, noting historical variations among the Fathers. While it supports doctrinal continuity, scholars debate its role in theological development, balancing tradition with historical context.

== Historical development ==
=== Early formulation ===
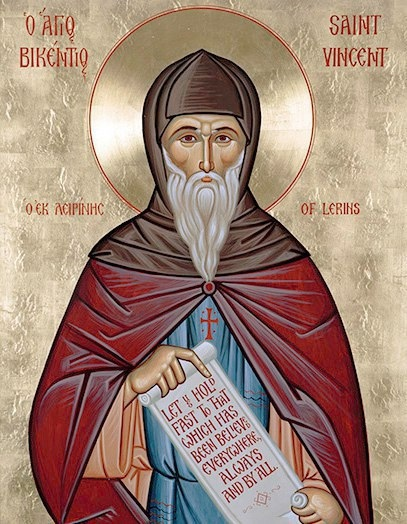
Vincent of Lérins, Gallic monk and early Christian writer on orthodoxy.

Saint Vincent of Lérins, in his Commonitorium (c. 450), established the principle of Consensus Patrum, stating that true Christian doctrine is that which has been "believed everywhere, always, and by all" (Commonitorium, 2.6). This principle highlights universality, antiquity, and consent as criteria for distinguishing orthodox teachings from heretical innovations. Vincent's argument built on earlier patristic thinkers like Irenaeus and Tertullian, who rejected Gnostic teachings on the grounds that they were recent theological deviations.

Vincent also clarified the proper application of the Consensus Patrum, stating that it pertains primarily to core doctrines of faith rather than minor theological questions. He explains: "The ancient consensus of the holy Fathers is not to be sought in all minor scriptural questions but especially in the rule of faith." (Commonitorium, xxviii, 72). The consensus serves as a safeguard against new theological errors, ensuring that doctrinal developments remain aligned with historical orthodoxy. However, it is not necessarily the primary method for addressing long-standing heresies but rather a principle to be applied when new theological challenges emerge.

Additionally, Vincent acknowledged doctrinal development, likening it to the natural growth of a body, where teachings are refined and clarified over time rather than discarded. His insights influenced later theological discussions, notably John Henry Newman's Essay on the Development of Christian Doctrine and the Second Vatican Council's Dei Verbum, both of which affirmed that tradition is a dynamic process that unfolds while remaining faithful to apostolic teaching.

=== Medieval catholicism and scholasticism ===
During the Middle Ages, Consensus Patrum played a crucial role in Catholic theology. The Scholastic tradition, particularly under figures like Thomas Aquinas, integrated the Church Fathers' teachings with Aristotelian philosophy to create a systematic theological framework. The Ecumenical Councils frequently invoked Consensus Patrum to defend doctrines such as the Trinity, Christology, and Marian theology.

=== Use in Reformation and Counter-Reformation ===
The rediscovery of Vincent's Commonitorium in 1528 sparked renewed debate between Catholics and Protestants during the Reformation. Catholic apologists cited Consensus Patrum to defend doctrines such as purgatory, the veneration of saints, and transubstantiation, arguing that they were part of the unchanging faith of the Church. However, Protestant theologians, particularly Martin Chemnitz (1522–1586), one of the leading figures of the Lutheran Reformation used Consensus Patrum to argue against medieval Catholic innovations such as clerical celibacy, relic veneration, and Eucharistic adoration. Catholics also turned the principle against Protestants, noting the lack of patristic support for sola fide (justification by faith alone) and other Reformation doctrines.

=== Later developments ===
By the late 16th and early 17th centuries, Lutheran theologians such as Aegidius Hunnius (b. 1550) and David Hollaz (d. 1713) began to move away from patristic consensus as a primary theological standard. Growing awareness of diversity in early Christianity, especially before the Council of Nicaea, led some scholars to question the existence of a uniform early Christian tradition. Influenced by Denis Pétau (Petavius), some noted that pre-Nicene Fathers were closer to Arian theology than to Nicene orthodoxy. As a result, Lutheranism increasingly emphasized sola scriptura as the only infallible theological standard, relegating Consensus Patrum to a secondary role.

Eastern Orthodoxy has consistently upheld Consensus Patrum as a central pillar of theological interpretation. The Orthodox Church holds that the unanimous voice of the Fathers, particularly in Ecumenical Councils, expresses the mind of the Church (phronema) and serves as a safeguard against doctrinal error. This principle was invoked in Hesychast controversies, where Orthodox theologians defended mystical prayer practices against accusations of heresy by appealing to the continuous witness of the Church Fathers. Consensus Patrum remains a fundamental part of Orthodox theological methodology, ensuring continuity with Apostolic Tradition.

In the Anglican tradition, Consensus Patrum played a key role in the English Reformation and post-Reformation theological debates. Figures like Richard Hooker and later Anglo-Catholics embraced patristic consensus as a middle way between Roman Catholicism and Protestantism. According to the Vincentian Canon, which is the principle that doctrine should align with universal patristic teaching, it was used to affirm sacramental theology (for example, Real Presence in the Eucharist). Defend episcopal governance (the role of bishops). Reject later innovations that lacked universal patristic support. This approach differentiated Anglicanism from both sola scriptura Protestantism and Roman Catholic reliance on post-patristic traditions. This vincentian approach found a home in Anglican theology, particularly under Archbishop William Laud, and continued to influence Anglican discussions on tradition and doctrinal authority.

== Modern theological reflections ==
The theological debate over Consensus Patrum remains relevant currently. The recognition that early Christianity was diverse has made simple appeals to patristic consensus more challenging. Some scholars argue that early Christianity, particularly the patristic and conciliar traditions that shaped the canon of Scripture, remains the foundation of Christian doctrine.

At the same time, figures like Jean Daillé (17th century Huguenot theologian) cautioned that the Church Fathers addressed the issues of their time and do not always provide direct answers to contemporary theological questions. As a result, modern theological discourse recognizes the value of patristic tradition but also acknowledges the need for ongoing theological development in response to new challenges.

== Authority and interpretation ==
=== Roman Catholic ===
According to Thomas B. Falls (1951), writing for the Catholic University of America Press, the testimony of a single Father or a small group is not sufficient to establish certainty; rather, doctrinal authority comes from the collective and unanimous agreement of the Church Fathers. If multiple Fathers express differing opinions, the rules of authority for individual Fathers must be applied. The consensus is sufficient to command intellectual assent and produce certainty. When the Fathers of a certain period were mostly bishops, their testimony in matters of faith or morals was considered infallible. St. Augustine used Consensus Patrum to counter Julianus the Pelagian, arguing that attacking the Fathers was equivalent to attacking the whole Church.

The consensus is particularly authoritative in interpreting Scripture. St. Leo I stated that Scripture must be understood as taught by the Apostles and Church Fathers. The Council of Trent and the First Vatican Council affirmed that no one should interpret Scripture against the unanimous consensus of the Fathers. A moral agreement among the Fathers is considered sufficient, even if not every single Father explicitly wrote about a doctrine. The silence of some Fathers on a specific issue does not invalidate the consensus.

Individual Fathers are not infallible, except for Roman Pontiffs when speaking ex cathedra. Their authority is greatest when they present a doctrine as the teaching of the whole Church. Common phrases indicating this include Christus dixit (Christ said), Apostoli tradiderunt (The Apostles handed down), Credimus (We believe), and Ecclesia tenet (The Church holds).

=== Eastern Orthodox ===
The influence of the Church Fathers is not limited to early Christianity but continues with important religious writers up to the present day. The Fifth Ecumenical Council explicitly endorsed specific Church Fathers as authoritative voices in theology. The Trullan Council provided a canonical list of approved Fathers whose writings were to guide interpretation. Contemporary Orthodox scholars maintain that Consensus Patrum remains a valid criterion for doctrinal truth, but it should be applied with discernment. The concept is often interpreted flexibly, acknowledging that while there is a general patristic agreement on core doctrines, variations exist in theological details. This recognition of variety in the contributions and emphases of the Church Fathers finds one of its most respected syntheses in the work of John of Damascus (c. 675–749). His defense of icon veneration anticipated the ruling of the Seventh Ecumenical Council (Nicaea II, 787).

Gregory Palamas (1296–1359) linked Consensus Patrum to Orthodox mystical theology, particularly Hesychasm and the doctrine of Divine Energies. Orthodox anthropology, influenced by patristic teachings, sees human nature in analogy with divine nature.

=== Protestantism ===
Protestantism, emerging in the 16th century, did not adhere to Consensus Patrum, unlike Catholicism and Orthodoxy. Reformers had a vested interest in undermining patristic consensus, as it was often used to support Catholic doctrine. Instead, sola scriptura and biblical perspicuity (the idea that Scripture is clear and self-explanatory) became central, discouraging reliance on patristic consensus. While Protestantism lacks a unified Consensus Patrum as found in Catholicism and Orthodoxy, denominational traditions maintain continuity with their key reformers, such as Luther, Calvin, and Wesley, through historical confessions and catechisms. However, these function as doctrinal foundations rather than an overarching patristic consensus.

Despite rejecting traditional patristic consensus, Protestantism developed its own version in the form of a theological consensus around Augustine's reading of Genesis. The doctrine of the historical Fall became deeply embedded in Protestant confessions, functioning as a kind of Protestant Consensus Patrum. This theological adaptation reflects how Protestantism, shaped by modern individualism, often prioritizes sola scriptura over historical patristic agreement. While Protestant theologians frequently reference early reformers, their writings do not carry the binding authority of a universal patristic consensus as seen in Catholic and Orthodox traditions. Consequently, Protestant theology remains more adaptable to cultural and intellectual developments while maintaining foundational doctrines through denominational confessions.

==== Reformed ====
Reformed Christianity, a branch of Protestantism, has engaged with the concept of Consensus Patrum in various ways. John Knox, a key figure in the Reformed tradition, highlighted the authority of the early Church Fathers, shifting his focus from universality to antiquity. Knox frequently referenced the interpretation of "the sacred scriptures, as interpreted by the ancient Church" (McCready, 2020, p. 129) and studied the Fathers extensively. He described himself as "a Christian of the six first centuries" (McCready, 2020, p. 129). While some have characterized him as prioritizing independent thought, Knox considered himself bound by the consensus of antiquity, presenting his theological framework as a form of "revived catholicity" (McCready, 2020, p. 129).

John Knox placed significant emphasis on the Church Fathers, viewing antiquity as especially authoritative within the Church of England. He believed the Fathers prioritized "the religion of the heart" and practical piety, elevating them above all but the sacred writers. For Knox, their collective wisdom was key to determining essential Christian doctrines. While valuing patristic teachings, he felt free to critique individual Fathers if they diverged from the broader consensus, notably Augustine. He particularly favored the Greek Fathers, seeing them as the "noblest portion of ancient Christianity" and aligning with their Platonic influences, which he shared with Wesley and the moderates.

=== Criteria for authority ===
The authority of a Church Father is determined by holiness, learning, antiquity, and orthodoxy. Fathers closer to Apostolic times (for example, Clement of Rome, Ignatius of Antioch, Polycarp of Smyrna) hold greater credibility. Those with intellectual and theological influence (for example, Basil, Ambrose, John Chrysostom) are highly regarded. A Father's broader ecclesiastical impact, such as engagement with bishops (for example, Irenaeus, Jerome, Cyprian), also elevates their standing. Additionally, theological arguments transitioned from relying solely on scriptural proofs to incorporating patristic proofs, with priority given to early and doctrinally orthodox Fathers.

== Criticism and limitations ==
Falls is of the perceptive that the principle of Consensus Patrum applies primarily to faith and morals, rather than scientific or philosophical matters. While the writings of the Church Fathers are not considered divinely inspired like Scripture, they serve as a significant guide in theological interpretation. Falls notes within the Humani Generis, theologians should not use isolated or unclear patristic statements to contradict established Church doctrine.

The concept of a unanimous agreement among the Fathers has been questioned by scholars such as Philip Schaff, who argued that patristic interpretations of Scripture varied significantly. However, despite differences in exegesis, the Fathers often followed a shared theological framework in defining core Christian teachings. Similarly, Vladimir Lossky cautioned against applying Consensus Patrum rigidly, noting that theological understanding develops over time. Some scholars have also suggested that Consensus Patrum may reflect Western legal traditions, framing patristic agreement in a way influenced by Roman jurisprudence.

Cardinal Robert Bellarmine acknowledged that the Church Fathers sometimes supported beliefs later understood to be incorrect. For example, many accepted the geocentric model of the universe, which was later revised based on scientific advancements. This suggests that patristic consensus does not necessarily equate to infallible or divinely revealed truth.

The authority of the Church Fathers has been a subject of ongoing theological discussion. Sergei Bulgakov argued that their writings were historically conditioned, with only certain teachings, such as Trinitarian and Christological doctrines, becoming formalized in Church dogma. Georges Florovsky, initially a strong proponent of patristic authority, later revised his position, emphasizing that the Fathers should be regarded as guides and witnesses rather than absolute authorities.

The scope of Consensus Patrum is generally recognized as being limited to core doctrines, with continued debate over how to distinguish universal theological truths from historically conditioned teachings. While the principle remains an important aspect of doctrinal continuity, some argue that excessive contextualization may risk reducing patristic writings to historical artifacts, potentially affecting their role in contemporary theology.
