= Animus =

Animus may refer to:

== Philosophy ==
- Anima and animus, Jungian concepts
- The ancient Roman concept of animus or soul
- Animus (journal), an electronic journal of philosophy and humanities

== Music ==
- "Animus", a track on the album Music of the Spheres by Mike Oldfield
- "Animus", a track on the album Reluctant Hero by Killer Be Killed
- "Animus", a track on the album A New Era of Corruption by Whitechapel
- "Animus", a track on the album Soundtracks for the Blind by Swans
- Animus, 2016 album by Venom Prison

== Fiction ==
- Animus (Doctor Who), a character from the Doctor Who serial The Web Planet
- Animus (Encantadia), a character in Etheria
- ANIMUS (graphic novel), a 2018 graphic novel by Antoine Revoy
- Animus (Marvel Comics), a character in the Marvel Universe
- Animus, the alter-ego of the Marvel Comics character Vamp
- "Animus" (Sanctuary), an episode of the TV series Sanctuary
- Animus, a kind of magic in the novel Wings of Fire by Tui T. Sutherland

== Games ==
- Animus: Stand Alone, a Nintendo Switch game
- Animus, a device in the Assassin's Creed series
- Animus, a Human or Daedric soul in The Elder Scrolls series
- Animus elemental, a weapon in the Neverwinter Nights 2 video game
- Animus, an ability unique to each beast in the game Warmachine and Hordes

== Law ==
- Animus (law), a term used in a variety of legal contexts
- Animus nocendi, an intent to do harm to another
- Animus revertendi, "with intention to return", in connection with animals and property rights
