= Branding iron =

Tool used to burn a mark on livestock or objects

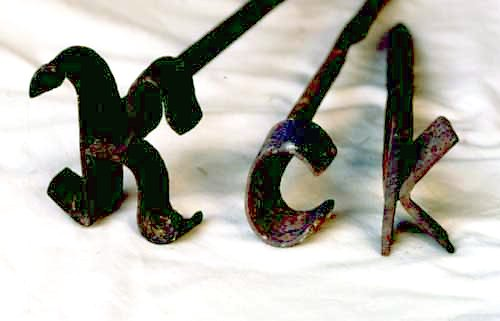
Branding irons from the Grant–Kohrs Ranch, c. 1910s.

A branding iron is used for branding, pressing a heated metal shape against an object or livestock with the intention of leaving an identifying mark.

== History ==
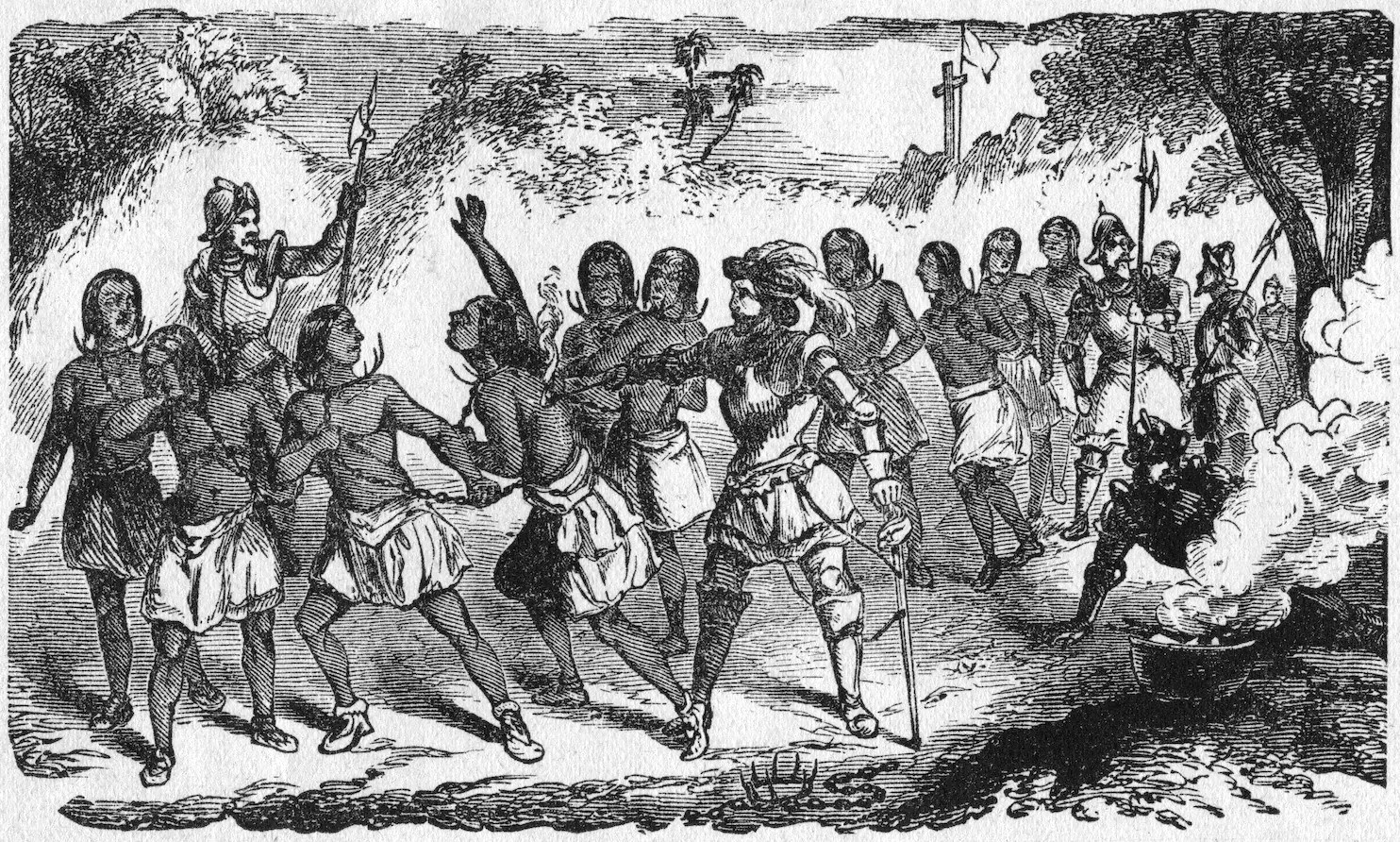
Native slave branding during the Spanish colonization of the Americas

The history of branding is very much tied to the history of using animals as a commodity. The act of marking livestock with fire-heated marks to identify ownership began in ancient times with the ancient Egyptians. The process continued throughout the ages, with both Romans and American colonists using the process to brand slaves as well.

In the English lexicon, the Germanic word "brand" originally meant anything hot or burning, such as a fire-brand, a burning stick. By the European Middle Ages it commonly identified the process of burning a mark into a stock animals with thick hides, such as cattle, so as to identify ownership under animus revertendi. In England, the rights of common including the common pasture system meant that cattle could be grazed on certain land with commoner's rights and the cattle were branded to show ownership, often with the commoner's or Lord of the manor's mark. The practice was widespread in most European nations with large cattle grazing regions, including Spain.

With colonialism, many cattle branding traditions and techniques were spread via the Spanish Empire to South America and to countries of the British Empire including the Americas, Australasia & South Africa where distinct sets of traditions and techniques developed respectively.

In the Americas these European systems continued with English tradition being used in the New England Colonies and spread outwards with the western expansion of the U.S. The Spanish system evolved from the south with the vaquero tradition in what today is the southwestern United States and northern Mexico. The branding iron consisted of an iron rod with a simple symbol or mark which was heated in a fire. After the branding iron turned red-hot, the cowhand pressed the branding iron against the hide of the cow. The unique brand meant that cattle owned by multiple owners could then graze freely together on the commons or open range. Drovers or cowboys could then separate the cattle at roundup time for driving to market.

== Types of branding irons ==
Branding Irons come in a variety of styles, designed primarily by their method of heating.

=== Fire-heated ===
The traditional fire-heated method is still in use today. While they require longer lengths of time to heat, are inconsistent in temperature and all around inferior to more advanced forms of branding, they are inexpensive to produce and purchase. Fire-heated branding irons are used to brand wood, steak, leather, livestock and plastics.

=== Electric ===
Electric branding irons utilize an electric heating element to heat a branding iron to the desired temperature. Electric branding irons come in many variations from irons designed to brand cattle, irons designed to mark wood and leather and models designed to be placed inside a drill press for the purposes of manufacturing. An electric branding iron’s temperature can be controlled by increasing or decreasing the flow of electricity.

=== Propane ===
Propane Branding Irons use a continuous flow of propane to heat the iron head. They are commonly used where electricity is not available. Utilizing the flow of propane, the temperature can be adjusted for varying branding environments.

A commercially built branding iron heater fired with L.P. gas is a common method of heating several branding irons at once.

=== Freeze-branding ===
In stark contrast to traditional hot-iron branding, freeze branding uses an iron that has been chilled with a coolant such as dry ice or liquid nitrogen. Instead of burning a scar into the animal's skin, a freeze brand damages the pigment-producing hair cells, causing the animal's hair to grow back white within the branded area. This white-on-dark pattern is prized by cattle ranchers as its contrast allows some range work to be conducted with binoculars rather than individual visits to every animal. To apply a freeze brand the hair coat of the animal is first shaved very closely so that bare skin is exposed. Then the frozen iron is pressed to the animal's bare skin for a period of time that varies with both the species of animal and the color of its hair coat. Shorter times are used on dark-colored animals, as this causes follicle melanocyte death and hence permanent pigment loss to the hair when it regrows. Longer times, sometimes as little as five seconds more, are needed for animals with white hair coats. In these cases the brand is applied for long enough to kill the cells of the growth follicle, those that create the hair filaments themselves. This leaves the animal permanently bald in the branded area. The somewhat darker epidermis then contrasts well with a pale animal's coat.

== Popular use ==
=== Livestock ===
Livestock branding is perhaps the most prevalent use of a branding iron. Modern use includes gas heating, the traditional fire-heated method, an iron heated by electricity (electric cattle branding iron) or an iron super cooled by dry ice (freeze branding iron). Cattle, horses and other livestock are commonly branded today for the same reason they were in Ancient times, to prove ownership.

=== Wood branding ===
Woodworkers will often use Electric or Fire-Heated Branding Irons to leave their maker's mark or company logo. Timber pallets and other timber export packaging is often marked in this way in accordance with ISPM 15 to indicate that the timber has been treated to prevent it carrying pests.

=== Steak ===
Steak branding irons are used commonly by barbecue enthusiasts and professional chefs to leave a mark indicating how well done a steak is or to identify the chef or grill master.

=== Leather ===
Branding Irons are used often by makers of horse tack often in place of a steel leather stamp to indicate craftsmanship.

== See also ==
- Cattle race
- Human branding
- Horse markings
- Livestock branding
- Ranch
- Squeeze chute
- Tattoo
