= Brand Book =

Book that records all livestock brands registered with an organization

A Brand Book published by the Oklahoma Cattlemen's Association.

A Brand Book records all livestock brands registered with an organization. In the U.S. most states have branding laws that require brands to be registered before use. This may be a state agency (usually affiliated with each state's Department of Agriculture) or a private association regulated by the state. Most states with such laws have a Brand Book for the entire state. Texas, an exception, registers brands at the county level. These book are usually provided free to law enforcement personnel and County Extension Agents. Some states have their Brand Books available online.

A typical Brand Book will usually have an image of the brand, the location of the brand on the animal, and the type of animal that will be branded, as well as the owner of the brand. Many Brand Books also record earmarks.

Brand Books are used by law enforcement officials, brand inspectors, and association investigators to record and track livestock movement, deter loss of livestock by straying or theft, and prosecute thieves.
