= Animus (law) =

Legal term

Animus (Latin for "mind" or "soul"), in Law Latin, characterizes the motivations of a legal person.

== Criminal law ==
In criminal law, animus nocendi ("intention to harm") is an accused's guilty state of mind with respect to the actus reus of the crime. It is thus analogous to mens rea, a more commonly used term in common law countries and originates in Roman understandings of censorship, where it describes an author's impermissible intention in writing a literary work.

In Scots law, animus malus ("evil intention") is sometimes used.

== Family law ==
In family law, animus deserendi is a spouse's firm intention to leave the matrimonial home—and hence the marriage. When combined with the "factum of separation," it "constitute[s]" desertion, which is grounds for divorce in some legal systems.

== Property law ==
In property law, animus possidendi ("intent to possess") is a person's manifest intention to control an object, and is one of the two elements—along with factum possidendi (the "fact of possession")—required to establish property in an object by first possession.

In both civil and common law, animus revertendi ("intent to return") distinguishes an animal in which a person may have a property right from a wild animal (which one cannot own) by reference to the animal's habitual return to a person who cares for it. For example, if a housecat regularly goes outdoors, but returns home each day, the cat's owner does not stop owning the cat during the time the cat is in a neighbor's garden. Blackstone describes the doctrine as follows:

The law therefore extends … possession farther than the mere manual occupation; for my tame hawk that is pursuing his quarry in my presence, though he is at liberty to go where he pleases, is nevertheless my property; for he hath animum revertendi. So are my pigeons, that are flying at a distance from their home … and likewise the deer that is chafed out of my park or forest, and is instantly pursued by the keeper or forester: all which remain still in my possession, and I still preserve my qualified property in them. But if they stray without my knowledge, and do not return in the usual manne[r], it is then lawful for any stranger to take them.

== United States constitutional law ==
In the jurisprudence of the Equal Protection Clause of the United States Constitution, animus ("intent") is an improper government purpose in passing legislation. The animus doctrine involves "scrutinizing the reasons for government action." If the legislature exhibits bias toward a protected class, the law is unconstitutional regardless whether the law might be justifiable on other grounds. The Supreme Court first defined it in Department of Agriculture v. Moreno (1973), holding that (italics in original):

… if the constitutional conception of "equal protection of the laws" means anything, it must at the very least mean that a bare congressional desire to harm a politically unpopular group cannot constitute a legitimate governmental interest.

The Supreme Court referred to animus in United States v. Windsor (2013):

[The Defense of Marriage Act] seeks to injure the very class New York seeks to protect. By doing so it violates basic due process and equal protection principles applicable to the Federal Government.
