= Vincent of Lérins =

Early Christian saint and theologian

Saint Vincent of Lérins
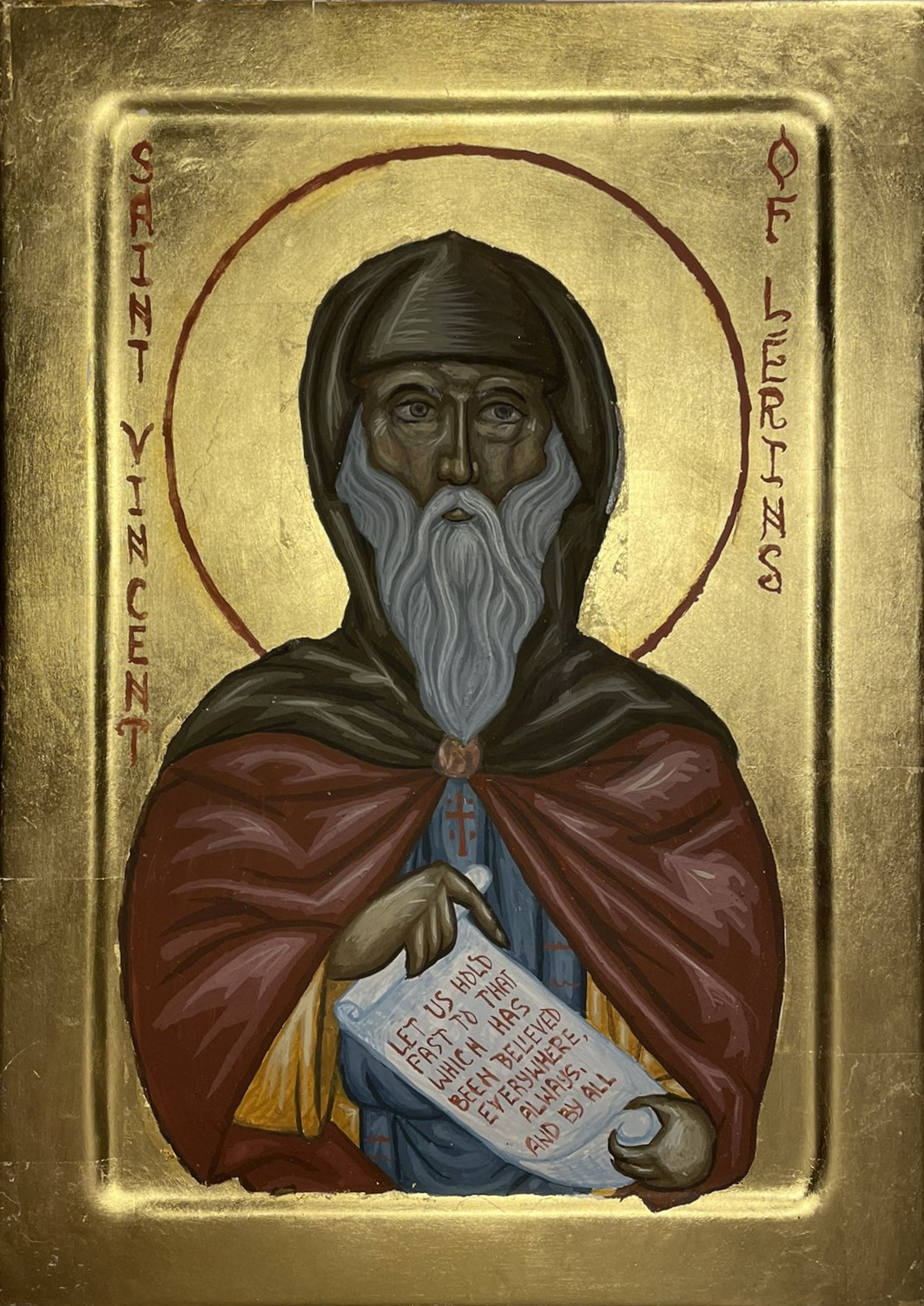
- Icon of St Vincent of Lerins painted by Bojan Teodosijević from Bible Illustrated for private collection commissioned by Harpreet Singh (Vinny)
- Died: c. 445; Insulae Lero et Lerina, Western Roman Empire (now in France)
- Venerated in: Catholic Church; Eastern Orthodox Church; Anglican Communion
- Feast: 24 May

Vincent of Lérins (Latin: Vincentius Lerinensis; died c. 445) was a Gallic monk and author of early Christian writings. One example was the Commonitorium, c. 434, which offers guidance in the orthodox teaching of Christianity. Suspected of semi-Pelagianism, he opposed the Augustinian model of grace and was probably the recipient of Prosper of Aquitaine's Responsiones ad Capitula Objectionum Vincentianarum. His feast day is celebrated on 24 May.

== Personal life ==
Vincent of Lérins was born in Toulouse, Gaul, to a noble family, and he is believed to be the brother of Lupus of Troyes. In his early life he engaged in secular pursuits; it is unclear whether these were civil or military, though the term he uses, secularis militia, may imply the latter. He entered Lérins Abbey on Île Saint-Honorat, where under the pseudonym Peregrinus he wrote the Commonitorium c. 434, about three years after the Council of Ephesus. Vincent defended the Marian title of Theotokos (God-bearer) in opposition to the teachings of Patriarch Nestorius of Constantinople, which were condemned by the Council of Ephesus. Eucherius of Lyon called him a "conspicuously eloquent and knowledgeable" holy man.

Gennadius of Massilia wrote that Vincent died during the reigns of the Roman Emperor Theodosius II in the East and Valentinian III in the West. Therefore, his death must have occurred in or before the year 450. His relics are preserved at Lérins. Caesar Baronius included his name in the Roman Martyrology, but Louis-Sébastien Le Nain de Tillemont doubted whether there was sufficient reason. He is commemorated on 24 May.

== Commonitory ==
Vincent wrote his Commonitory to provide himself with a general rule to distinguish Catholic truth from heresy, committing it to writing as a reference. It is known for Vincent's famous maxim: "Moreover, in the Catholic Church itself, all possible care must be taken, that we hold that faith which has been believed everywhere, always, by all." The currently accepted idea that Vincent was a semi-Pelagian is attributed to a 17th-century Protestant theologian, Gerardus Vossius, and developed in the 17th century by Cardinal Henry Noris. Evidence of Vincent's semi-Pelagianism, according to Reginald Moxon, is Vincent's "great vehemence against" the doctrines of Augustine of Hippo in Commonitory.

Pope Francis quoted Vincent's Commonitory on several occasions, notably his words on doctrine and the progress of doctrine: "The dogma of the Christian religion must follow these laws. It progresses, consolidating over the years, developing with time, deepening with age."

== Semi-Pelagianism ==
Semi-Pelagianism was a doctrine of grace advocated by monks in and around Marseille in Southern Gaul after 428. It aimed at a compromise between the two extremes of Pelagianism and Augustinianism, and was condemned as heresy at the Second Council of Orange in 529 AD after more than a century of disputes.

Augustine wrote of prevenient grace and expanded to a discussion of predestination. A number of monastic communities took exception to the latter because it seemed to nullify the value of asceticism practised under their rules. John Cassian felt that Augustine's stress on predestination ruled out any need for human cooperation or consent.

Vincent was suspected of semi-Pelagianism but whether he actually held that doctrine is not clear as it is not found in the Commonitorium. But it is probable that his sympathies were with those who held it. Considering that the monks of the Lérins Islands – like the general body of clergy of Southern Gaul – were semi-Pelagians, it is not surprising that Vincent was suspected of semi-Pelagianism. It is also possible that Vincent held to a position closer to the Eastern Orthodox position of today, which they claim to have been virtually universal until the time of Augustine, and which may have been interpreted as semi-Pelagian by Augustine's followers.

Vincent upheld tradition and seemed to have objected to much of Augustine's work as "new" theology. He shared Cassian's reservations about Augustine's views on the role of grace. In the Commonitorium he listed theologians and teachers who, in his view, had made significant contributions to the defence and spreading of the Gospel; he omitted Augustine from that list. Some commentators have viewed Cassian and Vincent as "semi-Augustinian" rather than semi-Pelagian.

It is a matter of academic debate whether Vincent is the author of the Objectiones Vincentianae, a collection of sixteen inferences allegedly deduced from Augustine's writings, which is lost and only known through Prosper of Aquitaine's rejoinder, Responsiones ad capitula objectionum Vincentianarum. It is dated close to the time of the Commonitorium and its animus is very similar to the Commonitorium sections 70 and 86, making it possible that both were written by the same author.
