= Commonitory =

- Author: Peregrinus (pseud. of Vincent of Lérins)
- Original title: Commonitorium
- Translator: Reginald S. Moxon
- Language: Latin
- Subject: apologetics, Christian theology
- Media type: Print
- LC Class: BR65 .V4

The Commonitorium or Commonitory is a 5th-century Christian treatise written after the council of Ephesus under the pseudonym "Peregrinus" and attributed to Vincent of Lérins. It is known for Vincent's famous maxim: "Moreover, in the Catholic Church itself, all possible care must be taken, that we hold that faith which has been believed everywhere, always, by all." (Note: "In ipsa item catholica ecclesia magnopere curandum est, ut id teneamus quod ubique, quod semper, quod ab omnibus creditum est....".)

Charles Heurtley introduced the Commonitory, in his translation, as Vincent's personal reference to "distinguish Catholic truth from heresy" based on the authority of Holy Scripture by which "all questions must be tried in the first instance" and "supplemented by an appeal to that sense of Holy Scripture which is supported by universality, antiquity, and consent."

- by universality – of the whole Church
- by antiquity – held from the earliest times
- by consent – acknowledged belief of all, or of almost all, whose office and character gave authority to their decision

Thomas Guarino commented, in Vincent of Lérins and the Development of Christian Doctrine, that Vincent of Lérins' theology "is often reduced to a memorable slogan: 'We hold that faith which has been believed everywhere, always, and by everyone.'"

Bernard Prusak explained in The Church Unfinished, that for Vincent, "the decrees of a universal council were to be preferred to the ignorance of a few" and the deposit of faith "did not exclude development or progress, as long as it was not an alteration" and accordingly, doctrines "could be taught in a new way."

Most of the work contains illustrations and applications of this principle. The work consisted originally of two tomes; but the second was lost or, according to Gennadius of Massilia, stolen while Vincent was still alive, and he wrote only a synopsis of the lost tome's contents but never rewrote it.
