= Animus revertendi =

The term animus revertendi is a Latin phrase that means "with intention to relocate".

It can refer to an animal that is under the care of another, which distinguishes it from an animal ferae naturae (wild beast). It is a type of ownership right recognized by property law. This legal concept also supports the intent of a candidate not to abandon one's residence due to work or study. The legal residence is protected by this legal concept.

== Purpose ==
The concept was originally created to protect the rights of livestock holders that had free ranging animals. Without the recognition of animus revertendi, any animal that strayed away from the owner's property onto public land could be killed and taken without any compensation to the original caretaker. It takes a lot of time and effort to raise and feed a beast. By recognizing that the caretaker has rights, it promotes the care and feeding of animals, especially for human consumption, creates incentive to produce by eliminating the free rider problem. It may also be applied to pets.

== Requirements ==
Fair notice of animus revertendi must be given, otherwise the right will not be recognized. The honest mistake of another in the absence of any fair notice will allow another party to claim the animal as his own.

== Types of notice ==
In the absence of prior knowledge of ownership, one or more of these (or other) factors by itself or in combination with another could be used to determine if a reasonable person would have believed animus revertendi existed.

- Species - is an animal that is typically domesticated
- Location - out of natural habitat
- Identifying marks - ex. nametag, branding
- etc.

== See also ==
- Livestock branding
