= Infancy Gospel of Thomas =

Gospel about the childhood of Jesus

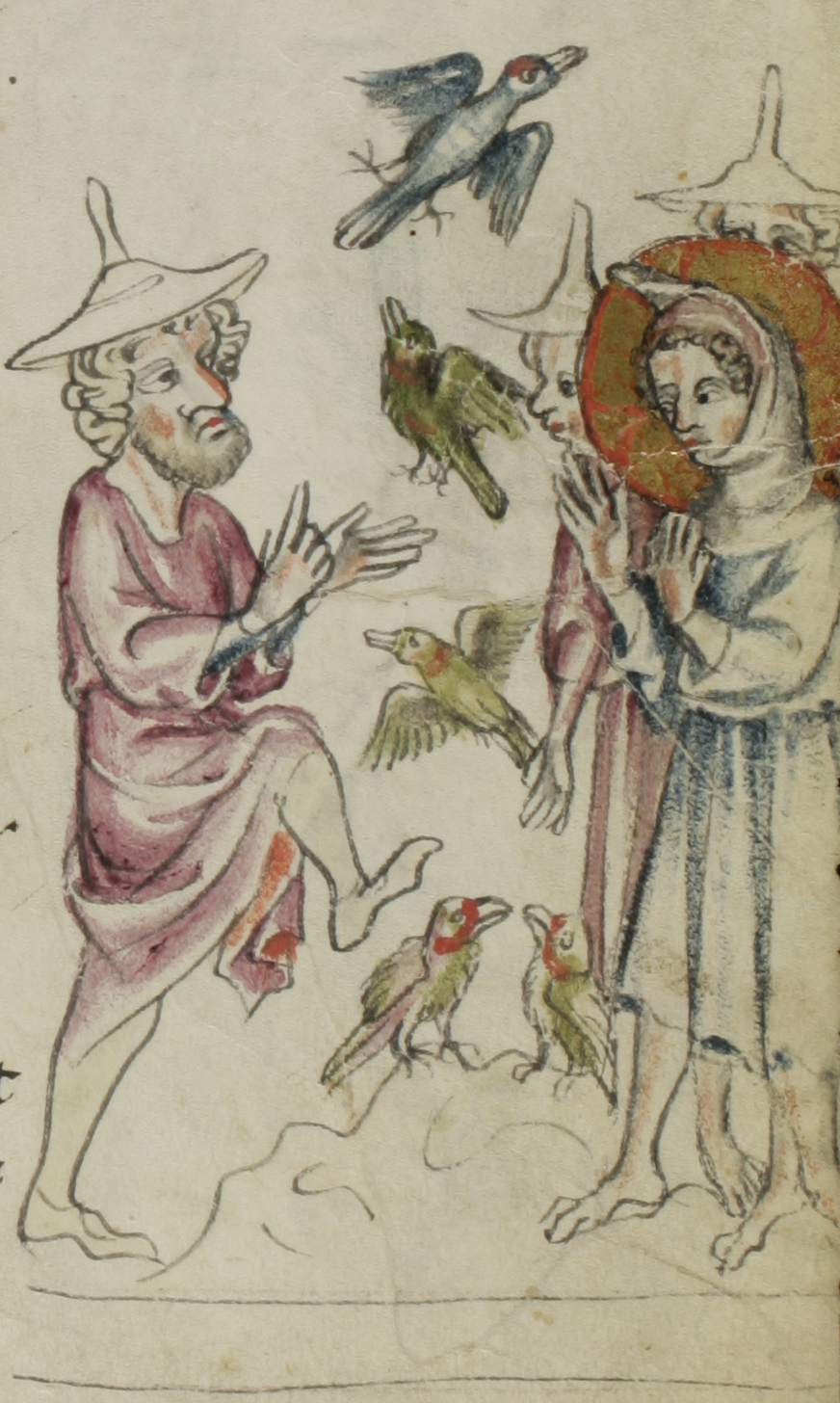
Young Jesus (figure on the right, with the halo) brings clay birds to life (14th-century illustration from Austria)

The Infancy Gospel of Thomas (also known as the Infancy of Jesus or Childhood of Jesus, the Paidika tou Iesou or Paidika (Greek), and abbreviated as Inf. Gos. Thom. or IGT) is an apocryphal gospel about the childhood of Jesus. Together with the Gospel of James, it was one of the earliest and most influential sources detailing the activities and life of the young Jesus, although neither are included in the New Testament canon. Its creation is generally dated to the second century. The oldest extant fragmentary writing is in Koine Greek and dates to the fourth or fifth century; Latin and Syriac attestations to a short form exist from the fifth or sixth century; and an 11th-century manuscript in Greek (Codex Sabaiticus) contains the earliest extant long form of the work. Variants flourished that expanded the infancy gospel by combining it with other stories in larger works and anthologies; the Gospel of Pseudo-Matthew is one example that proved popular in the Latin-speaking Western Church during the Middle Ages.

The Infancy Gospel of Thomas depicts a young Jesus in full possession of divine power and already dispensing wisdom with authority, even at an early age. It includes several miracles that spread widely and appear in other sources, such as Jesus's transforming clay sparrows into live sparrows. Jesus sometimes wields his power in a capricious way, such as when he curses and kills those who cross him. Although the Jesus depicted in this gospel can be an "enfant terrible", he balances this with miracles and healing.

The author of the work is not known. Some versions include a pseudepigraphal attribution to "Thomas the Israelite", which might be a reference to Thomas the Apostle, but this attribution appears to date to the medieval period and is only in some manuscripts. The work varies greatly in style from the canonical gospels. The Infancy Gospel of Thomas ends with its account of Jesus in the temple at age 12, a story originally from the Gospel of Luke.

== Date of creation ==
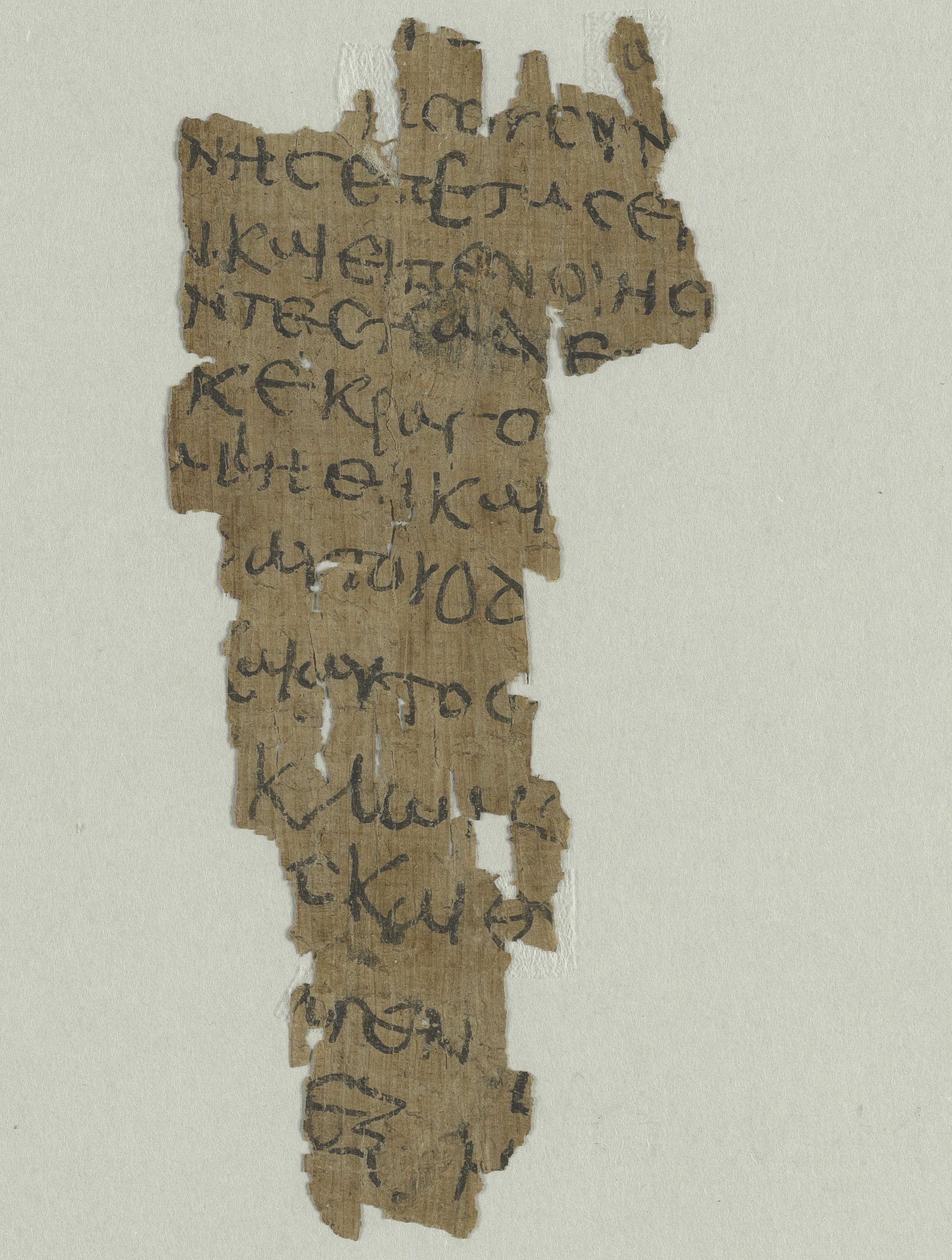
The earliest known surviving fragment of the work, Koine Greek written on a papyrus from Roman Egypt, created around the 4th or 5th century

During the era of early Christianity, many stories of Jesus of Nazareth circulated among Christians eager to hear details of his life, usually called gospels. Most scholars suggest that the earliest form of the collection of stories that would eventually be titled the Infancy Gospel of Thomas dates to the mid-to-late second century. (Note: A few scholars consider a later date as possible. Stephen Gero, Stephen J. Davis, and Jörg Frey suggest that only the isolated stories were spread in the 2nd–3rd centuries, and the full compilation could date as late as the fourth or fifth century.) Versions of the work and the stories within it appear to have been popular, with a wide geographical spread and many translations to different languages. The earliest forms of the work may have spread via oral tradition, either wholly or as several different stories.

Eventually it was transcribed to writing, and over time redacted and adapted. The earliest evidence of the text comes from the late second century. Two 2nd-century documents, the Epistle of the Apostles (by an unknown author) and Against Heresies (by Irenaeus), refer to a story of Jesus's tutor telling him, "Say alpha", and Jesus replying, "First tell me what is beta, and I can tell you what alpha is". Irenaeus, whose work is dated to around 180 CE, did not give a name to the book he quoted from; he condemned this book as spurious and heretical. Irenaeus's reference suggests that an early form of the infancy gospel circulating in the 2nd century would be plausible. There are further references that seem to indicate the spread of the stories; the Syriac form of the third-century Acts of Thomas contains a possible mention. In the fourth century, Epiphanius of Salamis's Panarion quotes Jesus's childhood miracles approvingly, but John Chrysostom condemns these stories of childhood miracles as false.

== Authorship ==
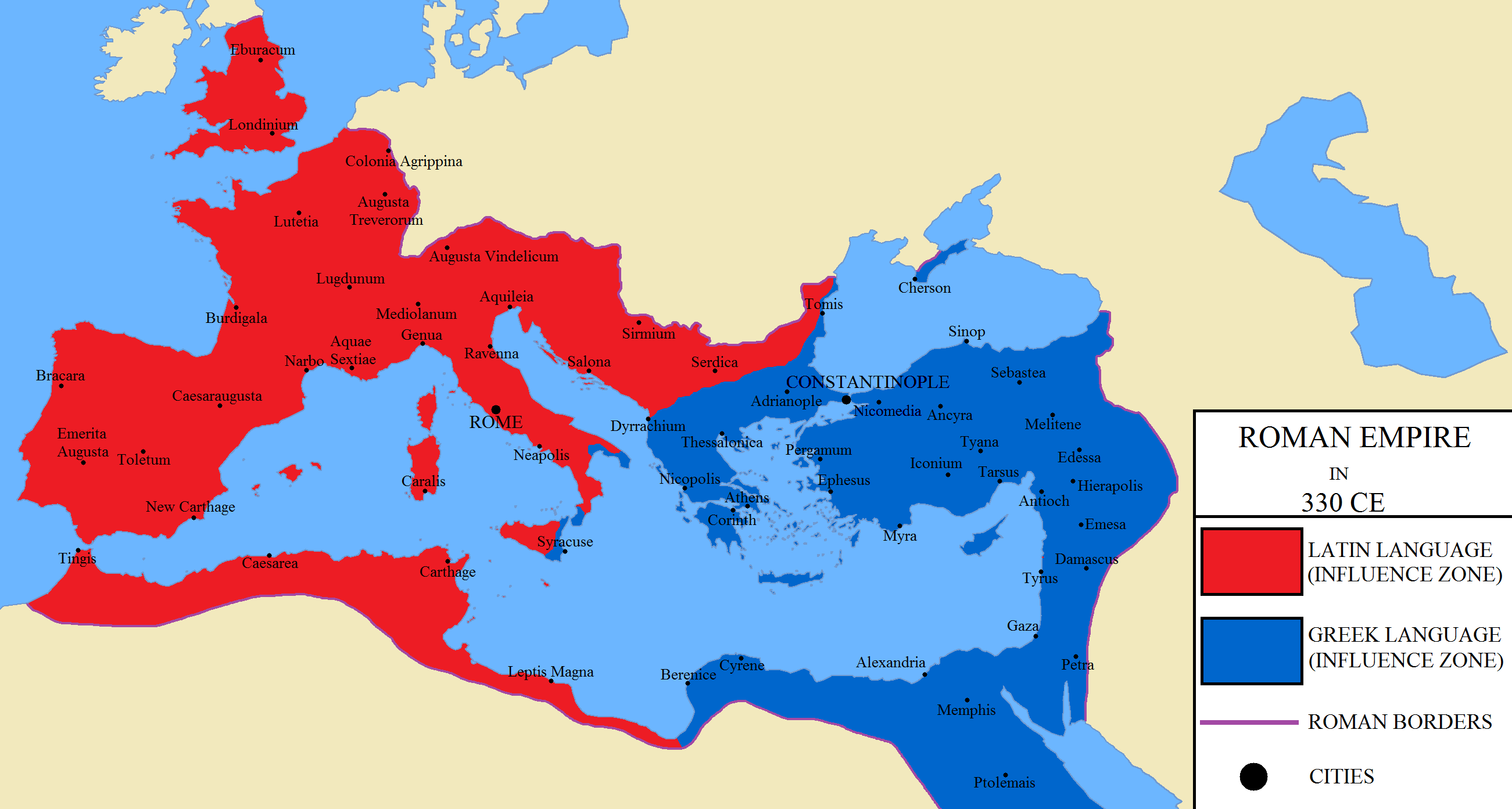
The Roman Empire in the 4th century, divided between the Latin-speaking West (red) and the Greek-speaking East (blue)

The author or authors of the gospel are unknown. The author was probably a gentile Christian, as the work displays no knowledge of Judaism. The author was educated and knew some rare words in an era when literacy was uncommon, but wrote in a style that was overall simple and readable. The geographic origin of the author is also unknown, leaving scholars with little more than guesses. Jan Bremmer suggests Alexandria in Roman Egypt as plausible. Tony Burke suggests it was a place where the Gospel of Luke was held in high regard: perhaps Asia Minor (modern Turkey) or Antioch in Roman Syria. Others such as Sever Voicu have suggested Roman Palestine. J.R.C. Cousland cautions that the safest, if least specific, suggestion is somewhere in the Greek-speaking Eastern Roman Empire.

The early versions of the work are anonymous. No author is indicated in the earliest surviving manuscripts (Latin, Syriac, Georgian, Ethiopic). In some later manuscripts dating from the Middle Ages, the gospel opens with a prologue where "Thomas the Israelite" introduces himself as the author, but with no further explanation. It is possible that this was meant to hint that the author was Judas Thomas, known as Thomas the Apostle, thought by some Christians to be a brother of Jesus and thus familiar with young Jesus's activities. (Note: A distant alternative possibility is a reference to Thomas, one of the disciples of Mani. Cyril of Jerusalem wrote in the 4th century that a work called the "Gospel according to Thomas" was used by Manichaeans, but this is now thought to be referring to a different work. A Manichaean link with the infancy gospel is no longer considered plausible.) Some medieval Latin versions close with an epilogue where the author claims to have been an eyewitness who witnessed these events personally, another claim that seems to have been added centuries after the original story's circulation. Two other figures have been attributed claims of authorship: John the Evangelist in some early Latin translations, and James, brother of Jesus in some Greek versions.

== Content ==
Young Jesus and his father Joseph sowing seeds in a field. An illustration from a manuscript of the Gospel of Pseudo-Matthew held by the Biblioteca Ambrosiana; the story originates from the IGT.

The text describes the life of the child Jesus from the ages of five to twelve, with fanciful, and sometimes malevolent, supernatural events. He is presented as a precocious child who starts his education early. This summary uses the order in the Greek A recension, one of the versions that has received the most attention and analysis.

A five-year old Jesus is playing in the mud after rain near a river. He organizes the water into pools. With a single word, he miraculously cleanses the water. He then crafts 12 sparrows from the clay while playing with other children. A Jew, displeased with seeing children work on the Sabbath, reports this to Jesus's father Joseph. Jesus gives life to the sparrows and they fly off. Another boy, the son of Annas, breaks the pools Jesus made, letting their water drain out. Jesus pronounces a curse upon the boy, and he instantly withers. The parents ineffectively complain to Joseph.

Later, another child either bumps into Jesus while running, throws a stone, or punches him (depending on the manuscript). Jesus kills the other boy by pronouncing a curse on him. The parents of the dead child complain to Joseph, and he rebukes Jesus. Jesus curses his accusers with blindness. Joseph then pulls his ear.

Jesus starts receiving lessons from a teacher named Zacchaeus, but he ignores him. While Zacchaeus tries striking his defiant student, Jesus replies and says that he should be the one doing the teaching, makes statements of his superior power and mission, and expounds on the hidden meanings of the letter alpha. Zacchaeus is ashamed and acknowledges the child's wisdom as far superior to his own. Jesus decides to revoke his earlier cruel curses, but the rest of the town remains wary, knowing the risks in angering the boy whose every word becomes truth.

Jesus and some friends are playing on a roof, but a child named Zeno (or Zenon) falls off and dies. The other children flee, leaving just Jesus when the angry parents arrive. Jesus resurrects Zeno to act as a witness, and Zeno tells the crowd that Jesus didn't push him off. In another story, Jesus heals a man who bled to death after cutting his foot with his ax. (Note: The healing of the injured foot (Chapter 10 in Greek A) is placed later in the Greek S recension (Chapter 16 there).)

Jesus's mother Mary sends him to fetch water, but the jar breaks; Jesus miraculously brings the water back anyway in his cloak. He sows wheat with his father Joseph, then reaps an extraordinary return, and shares the harvest with the poor and needy. At the age of eight, his father is working on a carpentry order for a bed, but the wood's size is wrong. Jesus miraculously stretches the wood, allowing his father to complete the bed.

Joseph once again tries to arrange a teacher for Jesus, without much success. The second teacher strikes Jesus after Jesus talks back to him and challenges him to explain the meaning of "beta", and Jesus curses and kills him. The third teacher attempts flattery, but soon finds Jesus himself doing the teaching. Because the third teacher correctly acknowledged Jesus's authority, Jesus relents in some versions and raises the second teacher back to life.

Jesus performs another three miracles. He heals Joseph's son James from a snakebite; resurrects a child who died of illness; and resurrects a man who fell and died in a construction accident. (Note: The miracles of healing the sick baby and the laborer are not found in the older Greek S recension.) Finally, the text recounts twelve-year old Jesus teaching at the Second Temple, an episode also found in the Gospel of Luke. (Note: Compare Inf. Gos. Thom 19:1–12 and Luke 2:41–52.)

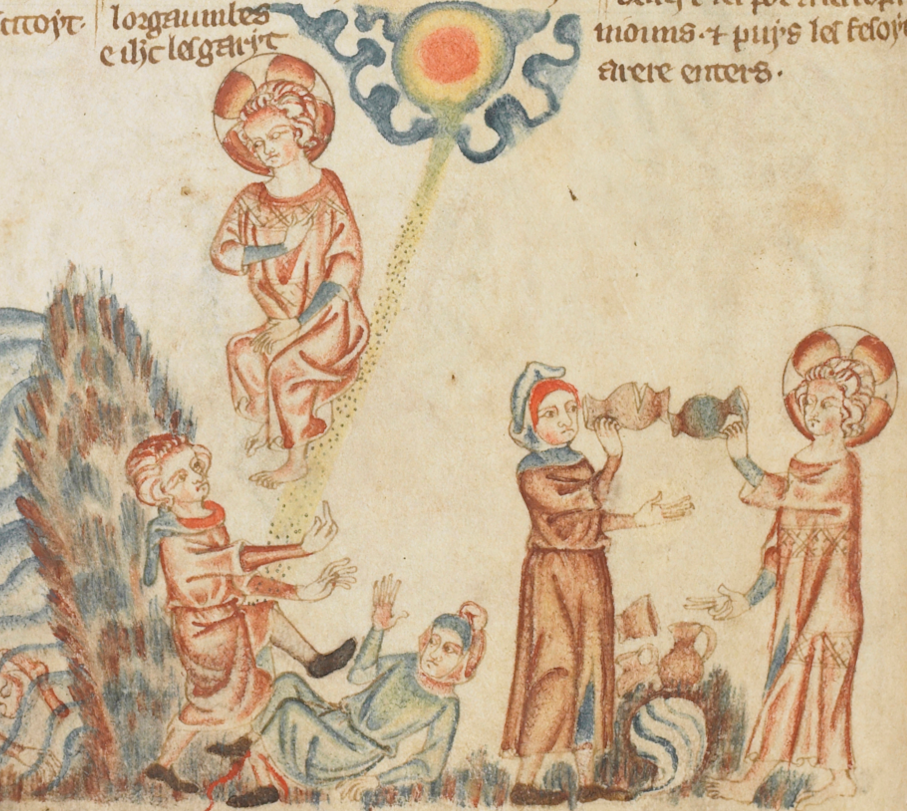
Young Jesus sitting on a sunbeam. Illustration from the Holkham Bible, a 14th-century Anglo-Norman book that included both canonical and non-canonical stories.

A variety of stories appear in some manuscripts but not others that are not part of Greek A (see episodes not in Greek A). A few examples include Jesus Riding the Sunbeam, Jesus and the Dyer, Making Dead Fish Come Alive, and Jesus Playing with Lions.

== Manuscripts and pre-modern translations ==
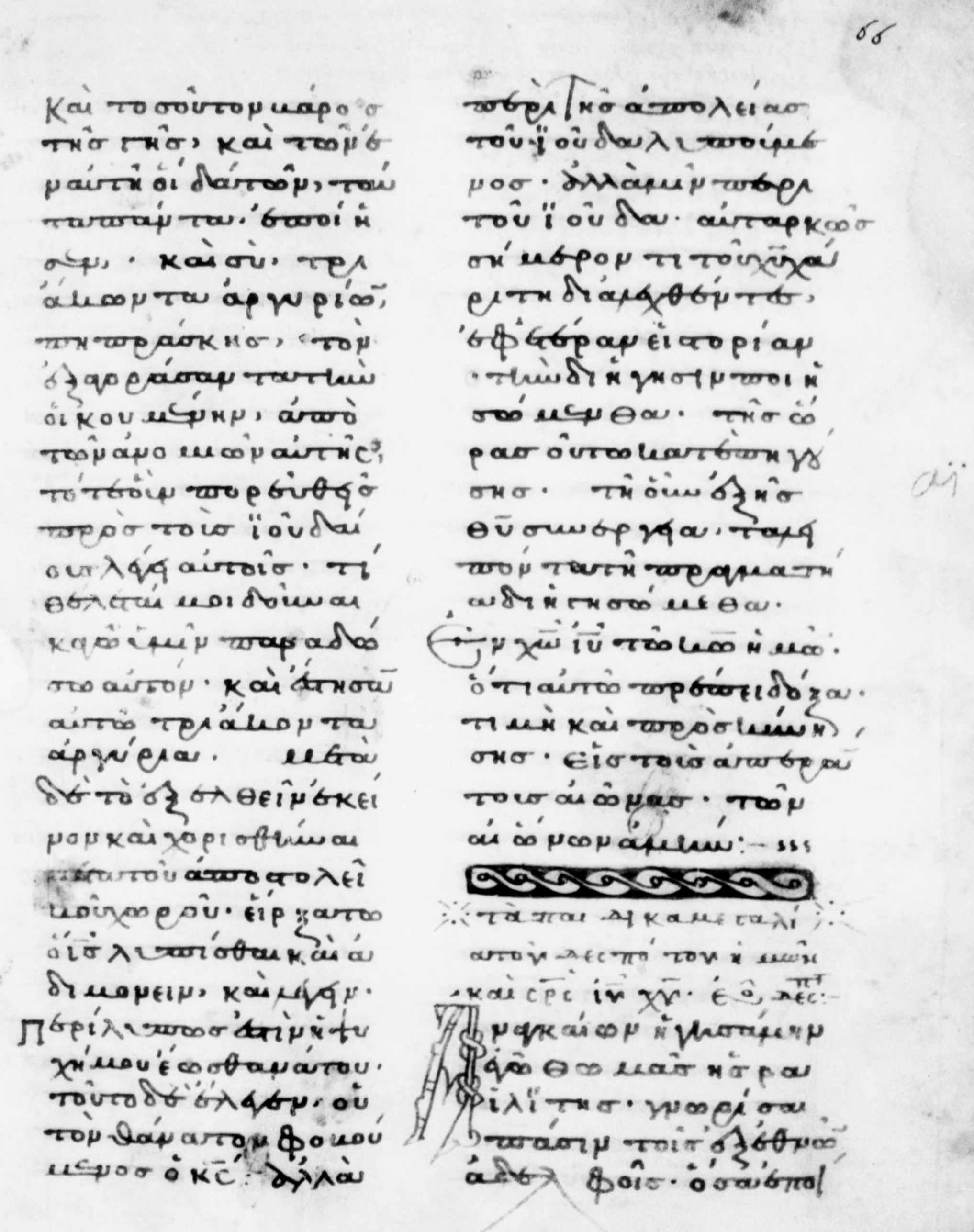
The start of the Infancy Gospel of Thomas in the Codex Sabaiticus 259, 66r

The Infancy Gospel of Thomas was written in the Koine Greek language, and was rapidly translated to Classical Latin and Syriac. (Note: Some earlier scholars such as Paul Peeters suggested it might have been written originally in Syriac, but this theory has not gained scholarly acceptance. The late attribution of "Thomas" as author removes the argument that Thomas the Apostle was revered more in Syriac Christianity than elsewhere as meaningful. The Greek text of the Codex Sabaiticus, considered a good guide to the early Greek form, does not show signs of being a translation from a Semitic language. Parallels in the IGT to the Gospel of Luke don't appear to match the Old Syriac version of Luke. This doesn't strictly rule out a non-Greek origin and an early translation into Greek, but does render the suggestion unlikely and without positive evidence in its favor.) Translations into other languages soon followed, including Armenian and Georgian. It proved a popular work, with a wide geographical reach. Translations spread from the Greek-speaking eastern Roman Empire far and wide: to the Latin-speaking Western half of the Empire; to Armenia and Georgia in the east; to Ireland in the north; to Ethiopia to the south. Classical- and medieval-era copies exist in thirteen different languages, an astonishing spread for a non-canonical work.

The many manuscripts, translations, shortened versions, composite versions, and references have differences, making an exact reconstruction of an archetype text impossible.

=== Manuscript types and recensions ===
Hand-written manuscripts differ from each other significantly. Although the invention of the printing press in the early modern period made it much easier to mass-produce identical copies of a text, the Infancy Gospel of Thomas circulated for centuries via manual transcription. Scholars of textual criticism classify groups of similar and related manuscripts into recensions. A scholar can then eclectically select the most common form of a sentence or chapter when manuscripts within a recension differ, resulting in a standard version that is close to all of them, even if no one manuscript matches the most-common reading of every verse.

Peter Lambeck rediscovered the work in 1675, examining a manuscript held in Vienna. The IGT became available to a wider audience with the publication of Johann Albert Fabricius's 1703 collection of Christian apocrypha. Fabricius also divided the work into chapters and verses. Constantin von Tischendorf published three versions in his 1853 book Evangelia Apocrypha, which he called Greek A, Greek B, and Latin. These have remained among the most popular for scholars to examine and translate.

Greek A is the most studied and well-known form in the modern era. Tischendorf based it principally on two manuscripts, and it is the longest Greek form. It consists of nineteen chapters. Scholars have updated this recension with other similar manuscripts, in particular for Tischendorf's chapter 6 where the manuscripts he consulted differed significantly from other manuscripts later found that fit the Greek A recension. A manuscript found by Tischendorf on a trip to Saint Catherine's Monastery on Mount Sinai in 1844 was used as a basis for Greek B. It is shorter (11 chapters) and differs from the A text in several parts. Some chapters are abbreviated, other entire chapters left out, and there are a few new lines.

A Greek version of the Infancy Gospel of Thomas was found in Codex Sabaiticus 259, a manuscript created in 1089 or 1090 in Cyprus. (Note: Codex Sabaiticus also includes an anonymous margin note declaring that these stories of childhood miracles are falsehoods spread by Manichaeans and are in contradiction with the Gospel of John. The margin note is loosely dated to the 16th century on paleographical grounds, so likely centuries after the creation of the codex.) Sabaiticus is a good match in its details to Irenaeus's 2nd-century quotation, and its form of the text is called Greek S. It is slightly shorter than Greek A. The scholarship of Sever Voicu, Tony Burke, and Reidar Aasgaard in 1991–2010 identified this form as more likely to be closer to the original form than the Greek A and Greek B manuscripts of Tischendorf, a stance that has been corroborated by other scholars of the text.

Stemma of translations and versions of the Infancy Gospel of Thomas over time. The estimated chronology is left to right: the hypothesized Greek original is c. 2nd century; Syriac and Early Latin are c. 3rd century; the long Greek S form is c. 4th–7th centuries; Arabic, Irish, and Armenian are c. 6th–9th centuries; Slavonic was translated c. 10th–11th centuries; and stories of the IGT are incorporated into Pseudo-Matthew c. 11th century.

=== Early translations ===
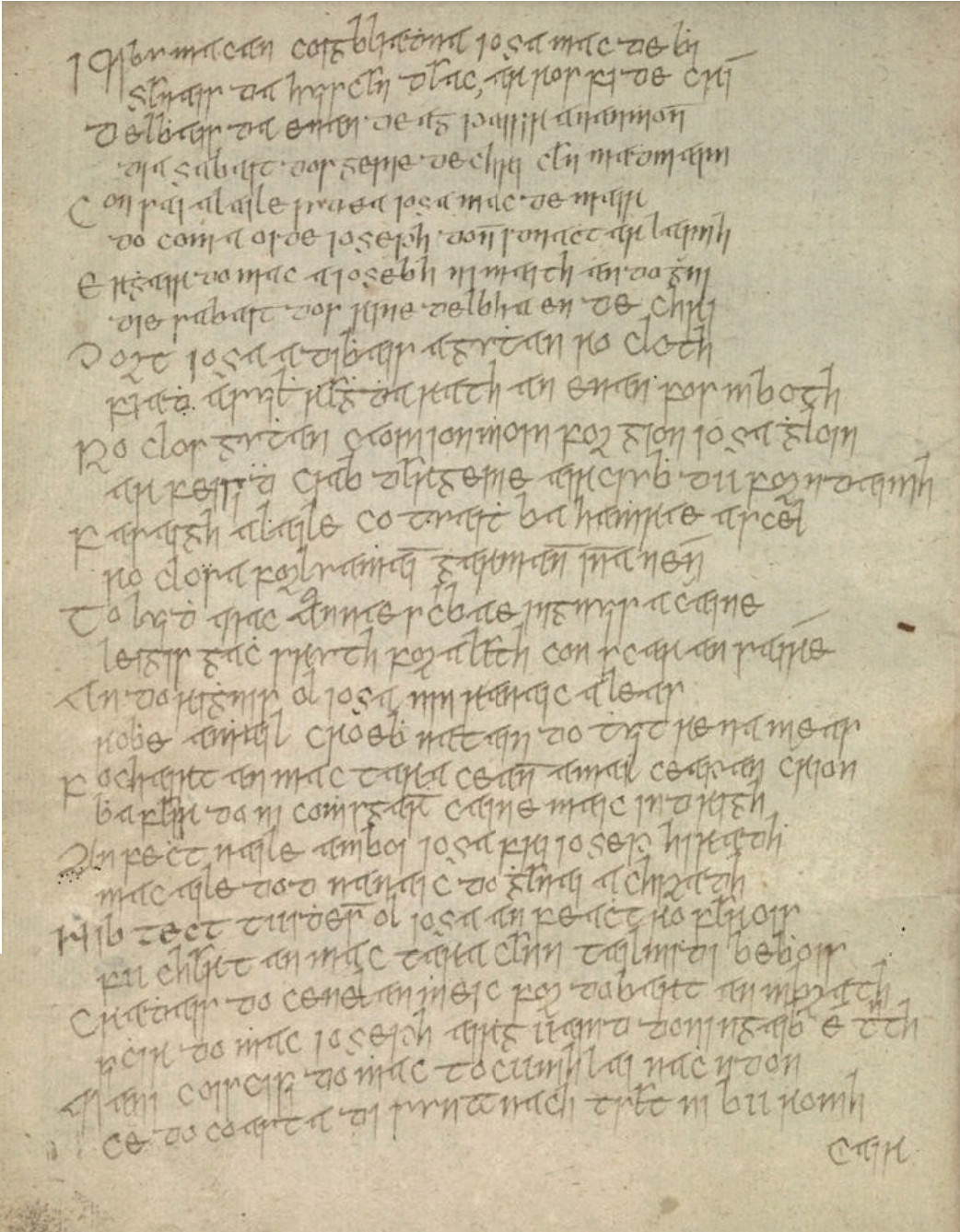
G50, an Irish manuscript containing a versified translation of the IGT

The Syriac translation is thought to originate from the 2nd–6th centuries. It was likely used as a source for an Arabic translation centuries later. They are both examples of shorter recensions; the surviving Greek texts contain material not in Syriac nor related versions.

The work was translated into Latin twice into two distinct forms: Early Latin (c. 3rd century) and Late Latin (c. 11th–15th centuries). Parts of the early Latin version were translated into Old Irish poetry, probably around 700 CE according to James Carney. The Late Latin version was the first manuscript discovered with a prologue with stories set during the Flight into Egypt described in the Gospel of Matthew. Some Greek manuscripts also include the Egyptian prologue and were likely the source of the Late Latin translation, and have been organized into a recension called Greek D. (Note: The 'D' is a reference to Armand Delatte, who published in 1927 a 15th-century Greek manuscript with such a prologue.)

The infancy gospel was translated into Armenian and Old Georgian by the 6th or 7th century, although the Armenian is lost and the surviving Georgian manuscript only includes the first half of the work.

It is unclear when exactly the work was translated into Ethiopic (Ge'ez). Some scholars suggest it was translated directly from Greek and fairly early, before the seventh century; others that it happened after the Early Muslim conquests and that the Ethiopic was translated from an Arabic or Syriac version that spread to Ethiopia. The surviving manuscripts are from later centuries, rendering a dating of the origin imprecise. It is included as a chapter of larger collections of the miracles of Jesus.

The translation into Church Slavonic was from Greek and the longer recensions. It appears to have probably been translated in medieval Bulgaria, most likely around the 10th or 11th centuries. From there, it spread to Serbia, Ukraine, and Russia.

=== Composite works ===
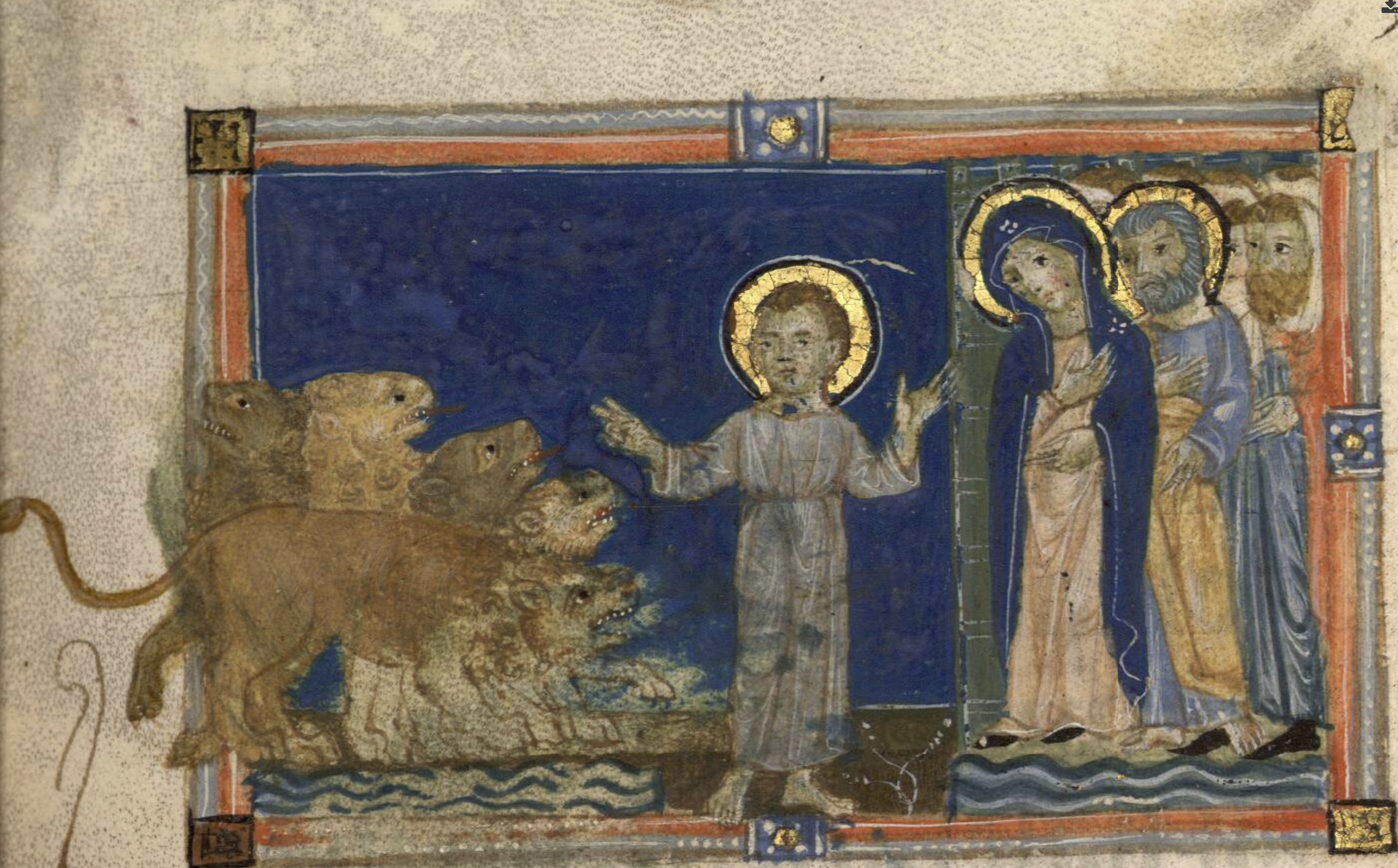
Christ Child playing with lions near the Jordan River. Though not found in the Greek versions, this story is in the Gospel of Pseudo-Matthew.

Just as the Infancy Gospel of Thomas may have collected individual stories already in circulation in the 2nd century, the gospel was combined with other works as it spread in later eras. The Syriac version was used as a source for the Arabic Infancy Gospel, which likely was translated into Arabic in the 7th, 8th, or 9th century. The Syriac versions are generally found as a chapter within another work; both the West Syriac Life of Mary and some copies of the East Syriac History of the Virgin contain it. The Armenian Infancy Gospel from the 7th century includes a few parallel stories that originate from the IGT.

The most influential was likely the Latin Gospel of Pseudo-Matthew, which combines the work with the Gospel of James, and pseudepigraphically claims it was translated from a work of Matthew the Evangelist. It was popular throughout the Western church, and helped establish several common beliefs about the young Jesus. Many copies of the Gospel of Pseudo-Matthew contain an introduction that claims the work was translated by Saint Jerome, the esteemed translator of the Vulgate, and thus an apparent stamp of orthodox approval. Though early versions of Pseudo-Matthew from the 8th–10th centuries lack IGT material, many manuscripts from the 11th–15th centuries include it. (Note: Constantin von Tischendorf called the section of Pseudo-Matthew that derived from the IGT the pars altera ("the other part"), and this term is still sometimes used for discussing specifically the Latin IGT as seen in Pseudo-Matthew chapters 26-42. "Gospel of Pseudo-Matthew" is itself a modern term, and medieval manuscripts use a variety of titles. The manuscript Tischendorf consulted opened with "Here Begins the Book concerning the Origin of the Blessed Mary and the Childhood of the Savior, from the Gospel Written by the Blessed Matthew in Hebrew and Translated by the Blessed Elder Jerome into Latin", hence the title.)

=== Earliest manuscripts ===
Up until 2024, the oldest surviving documents were two sixth-century Syriac manuscripts and a Latin palimpsest from the fifth or sixth century housed in Vienna. In 2024, a Greek papyrus fragment originating from Roman Egypt and dating from the fourth or fifth century was discovered at the University of Hamburg library, making this the new oldest surviving manuscript of the infancy gospel. The fragment largely matches the 11th century Codex Sabaiticus version, providing support for the theory that Sabaiticus is a good guide for the content of older Greek versions.

== Title ==
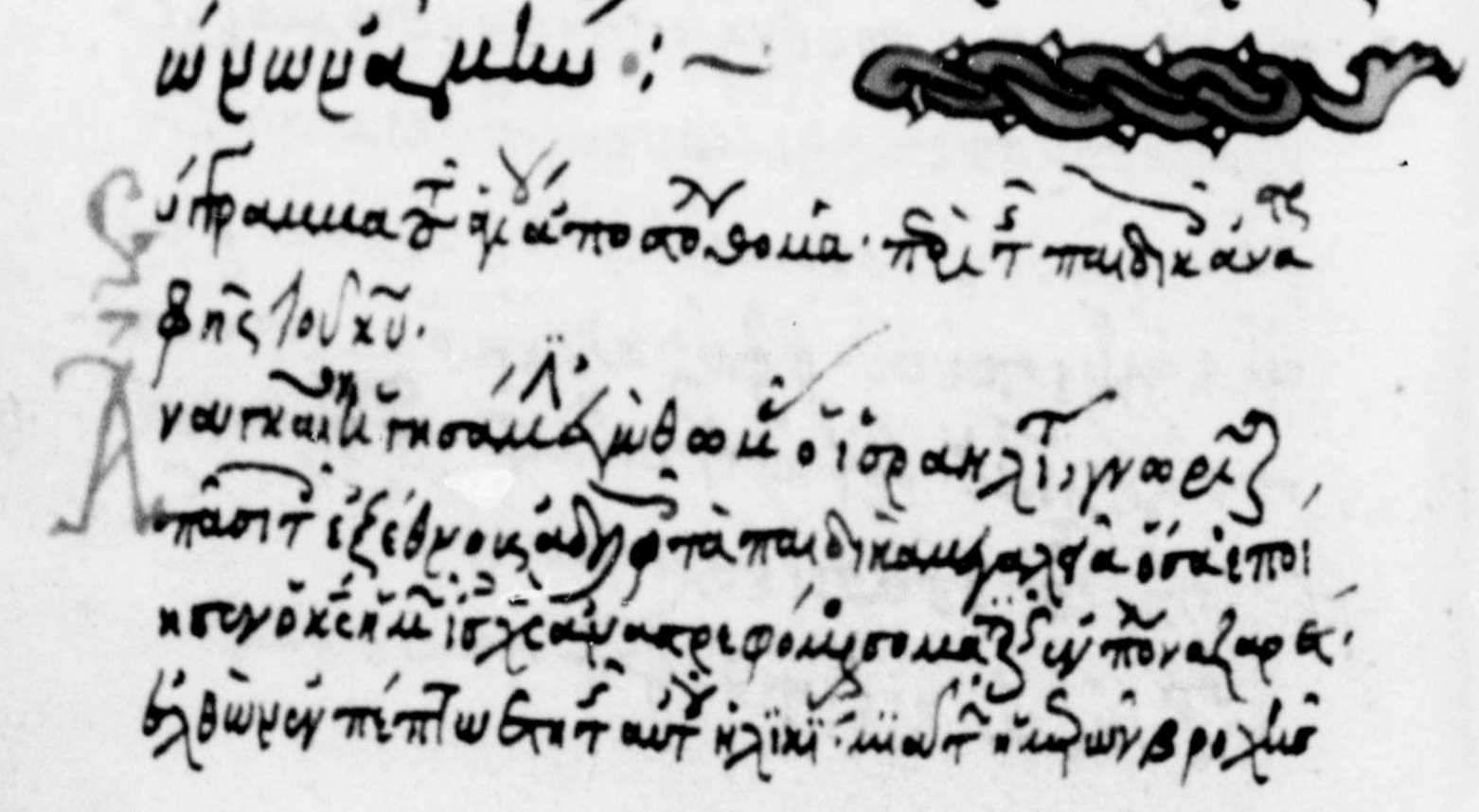
The start of the Greek B version. The title reads "Treatise of the Holy Apostle Thomas, concerning the conduct of the Lord when a child."

The original manuscripts contain a variety of titles. Johann Albert Fabricius called the work Evangelium Thomae ("Gospel of Thomas") in his 1703 collection, and Constantin von Tischendorf's influential 1853 collection of apocrypha spread the title "Gospel of Thomas" further, resulting in that being the standard title in the 19th and early 20th centuries. The manuscripts Fabricius and Tischendorf consulted included an attribution to "Thomas the Israelite".

Later developments complicated use of this title. The discovery of the Coptic Gnostic Gospel of Thomas and its publication in 1956 created ambiguity, resulting in the addition of "Infancy Gospel" to the title to refer to this work specifically. Later scholars sifting through older manuscripts found that the editions of the work were more diverse than believed before, and earlier manuscripts include no such attribution to Thomas, rendering "of Thomas" something of a misnomer for them. Even the manuscripts including the Thomas attribution do not appear to have called themselves "Gospel of Thomas", rendering it a title strictly of the modern era. Also, the stories do not cover just the "infancy" of Jesus. Several scholars have been unhappy with the "Infancy Gospel of Thomas" title and have suggested alternative names that better describe the topic.

Some titles include:

- Infancy Gospel of Thomas (Inf. Gos. Thom.; IGT)
  - Θωμᾶ Ἰσραηλίτου φιλοσόφου ῥητὰ εἰς τὰ παιδικὰ τοῦ κυρίου Thomá Israilítou filosófou ritá eis tá paidiká toú kyríou (Greek: "The accounts of Thomas the Israelite, the Philosopher, concerning the childhood of the Lord.")
  - Euangelium Thomae de infantia Saluatoris (Latin: "Gospel of Thomas about the infancy of the Savior")
- Childhood of Jesus (Infancy of Jesus; Paidika)
  - παιδικὰ τοῦ κυρίου ἡμῶν Paidiká toú kyríou imón (Greek: "Childhood Deeds of our Lord")
  - Τὰ παιδικὰ μεγαλεῖα τοῦ δεσπότου ἡμῶν καὶ σωτῆρος Ἰησοῦ Χριστοῦ Tá paidiká megaleía toú despótou imón kaí sotíros Iisoú Christoú (Greek: "The Great Childhood Deeds of our Lord and Savior Jesus Christ")
  - ܛܠܝܘܬܗ ܕܡܪܢ ܝܫܘܥ Ṭalyūteh d-Maran Īšō‘ (Syriac: "The Childhood of the Lord Jesus")

== Early Christian groups and ideologies ==
=== Possible links with Gnosticism ===
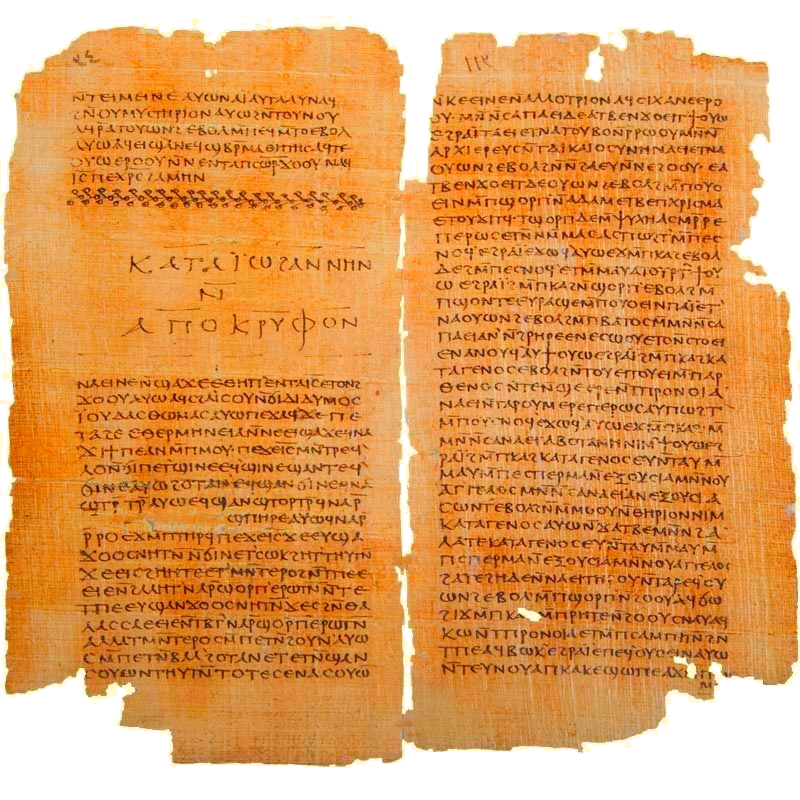
The first pages of the Gnostic Gospel of Thomas, a "sayings gospel" discovered in the Nag Hammadi library in Egypt. Many patristic references to the "Gospel of Thomas" were likely to this work, not the infancy gospel.

Gnosticism was a variety of Christianity that flourished in the 2nd century, but attracted fierce opposition from proto-orthodox theologians. Before the discovery of the Gnostic Gospel of Thomas, it was thought by 19th-century and early 20th-century scholars that some anti-Gnostic denunciations made by early Christian writers might have referred to the infancy gospel. Early Christian theologian Origen of Alexandria condemns a gospel he calls "According to Thomas" in a homily on the Gospel of Luke, saying it is the work of heretics. The passages Origen quotes do not appear in the IGT. The third-century book Refutation of All Heresies associates a Gnostic group it calls the Naassenes with using a gospel called "According to Thomas". This evidence has since been discarded as misleading, in particular after an influential 1971 journal article by Stephen Gero both showing the lateness of the ascription to Thomas and attacking the plausibility of a connection to Gnosticism. It is now thought that Origen was referring to the Gnostic "Gospel of Thomas", not the infancy gospel which does not appear to have been known by the title of "Gospel of Thomas" in the classical era. (Note: On similar grounds, scholarship has shifted on the work's length. The Stichometry of Nicephorus indicated a higher line count for a "Gospel of Thomas" than appropriate for the infancy gospel, resulting in speculation that a longer form of the work that included Gnostic material was denounced, but that this material was removed in orthodox revisions and lost. Given that the work was not yet known as "Gospel of Thomas", it is now thought that the stichometry could not have been referring to the infancy gospel at all. No expurgation of Gnostic content happened.)

There remains one possible link. Irenaeus condemned an unnamed work that included the story of the meanings of "Alpha" and "Beta", and thus potentially an early version of the Infancy Gospel of Thomas. He wrote that this work was used by a Gnostic group called the Marcosians, but his condemnation was seemingly on grounds of it being used for numerology and mystical secrets by them which Irenaeus found intolerable. It is possible that the creator of the story had no such intentions when writing the story, though. More generally, Gnostics cited material shared with proto-orthodox Christians in writings discovered at the Nag Hammadi library, so Gnostics using a particular work does not necessarily imply the work originated from Gnosticism. It is also possible that Irenaeus rejected any work he considered deviant by associating it with Gnosticism, rendering him a weak source on exactly how tied this story was with Gnosticism.

A few scholars such as Oscar Cullman have defended such a possible link. He wrote that aspects of the work still seem to potentially fit within a Gnostic milieu, such as Jesus being a source of mystic wisdom from an early age. He cited the extended version of the dialogue between Jesus and his first teacher Zacchaeus in a Slavonic version as potentially representing an older and more Gnostic form of the text. Other scholars have not found this argument convincing, and argue that stories of Jesus being superior and wise were common among all branches of early Christianity.

=== Possible links with Judaism and Jewish Christianity ===
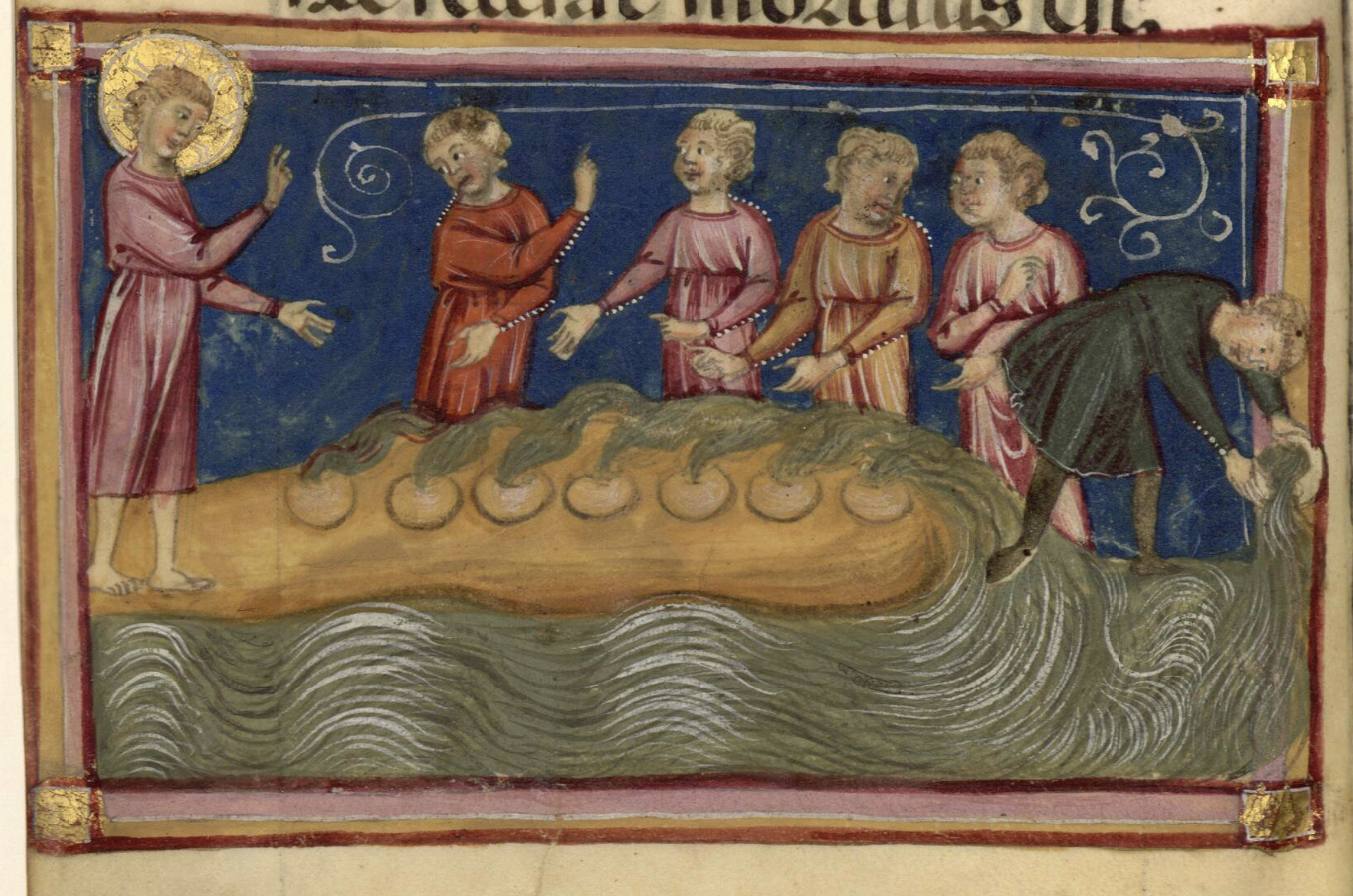
The son of the Jewish priest Annas ruins young Jesus's pools; from a 13th-century illustrated manuscript of the Gospel of Pseudo-Matthew.

Many scholars see signs within the work of tensions between Jews and Christians that would fit a 2nd–4th-century milieu. Similar to the Gospel of John, several antagonists are introduced simply as "a Jew" or "the Jews". In Chapter 3, Jesus places a curse on the child of "Annas the High Priest":

And Jesus, seeing what had happened, said to him, "Your fruit (shall be) without root and your shoot shall be dried up like a branch scorched by a strong wind". And instantly that child withered.

— Infancy Gospel of Thomas (Greek S) 3:2-3

The line in Isaiah 11 prophesying that "A shoot shall come out from the stump of Jesse, and a branch shall grow out of his roots" was well-known in the era; the Book of Jeremiah calls Israel a "righteous branch." (Note: See Isaiah 11:1 and Jeremiah 23:5.) Jesus cursing the son of Annas's "fruit" and drying up his "shoots" in a comparison with a tree branch can be read as him revoking this biblical analogy of the Jews to a thriving tree, and condemning not just the lineage of one child, but of all Israel.

Alternatively, Andries van Aarde and Sever Voicu have argued that the original version of the IGT may have come from authors who were Ebionites, a sect of Jewish Christians. Other scholars, including Tony Burke and J.R.C. Cousland, have been skeptical of such a connection, considering it more likely the author was a non-Jewish gentile Christian.

A medieval Jewish work, the Toledot Yeshu, contains the story of Jesus animating the birds, although Jesus's age is unspecified in it. The Toledot does not deny Jesus animated sparrows; it instead attributes it to magic rather than divine power. Kristi Upson-Saia argues that the lost original version of the IGT might have drawn on a Jewish anti-Christian source akin to the Toledot, which portrayed Jesus as an intelligent yet disrespectful trickster and magician. In this view, this origin was lost and revised by later Christians, who kept the unusual depiction of Jesus but revised the tone more positively. Others, such as Stephen Davis, have argued that the reverse is more likely true: that the Toledot Yeshu is evidence that Jews were familiar with the infancy gospel traditions, and adapted them.

=== Christology debates ===
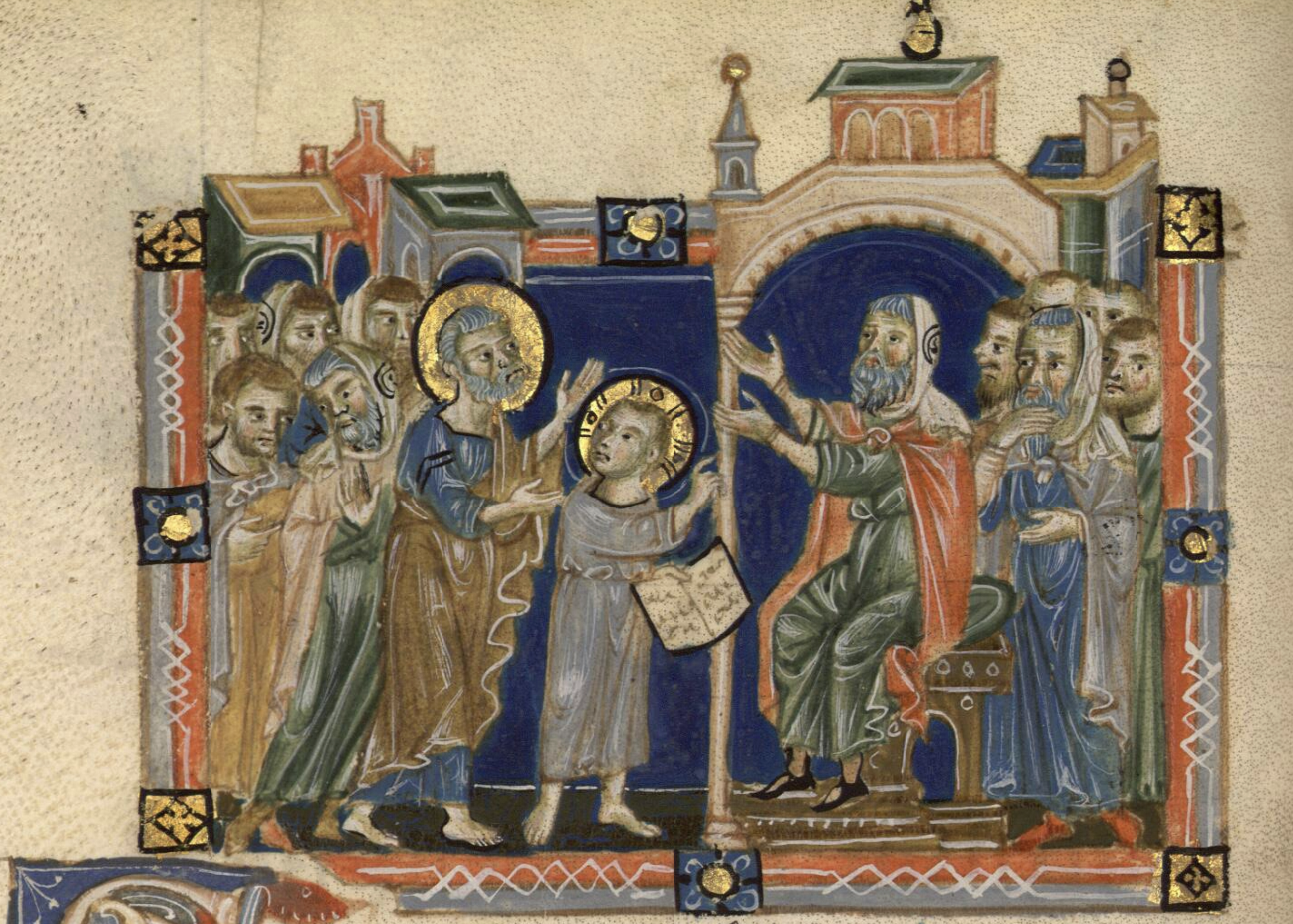
Young Jesus teaches his teacher Zacchaeus; from a 13th-century illustrated manuscript of the Gospel of Pseudo-Matthew

(Zacchaeus the teacher said:) What great thing this child is — whether a god, an angel, or whatever else — I don't know.

— Infancy Gospel of Thomas (Greek S) 7:4

J.R.C. Cousland has argued that the author displays a high Christology that emphasizes Jesus's divine nature over his human one, and this was consistent with stories current in Roman society that depicted gods as unpredictable and fickle, yet ultimately benevolent. Jesus being in full possession of divine power at a young age also places the work against adoptionist versions of early Christianity that held Jesus became the Son of God at his baptism, rather than his birth or the beginning of time. Though of an exalted and divine status, Jesus still feels pain when his ear is pulled.

The older forms of the work generally eschew theologically charged titles of Jesus such as "Messiah" and "Savior" after the first chapter's introduction, instead referring to him usually as "Jesus, the child" and variants.

== Relationship with other works ==
The Infancy Gospel of Thomas includes some parallels with canonical gospel stories, in particular the Gospel of Luke. For example, Jesus stays quiet in parts of Pilate's trial, and young Jesus remains silent at the start of one of his confrontations with a teacher. Jesus tells the son of Annas as he withers him that he will bear no "fruit", a loose parallel to the cursing of the fig tree to bear no fruit. Some of the miracles can be seen as "prefiguring" future gospel stories. Jesus playing on the Sabbath and being criticized for this is similar to adult Jesus healing on the Sabbath in the synoptic gospels, and his creating specifically 12 clay birds can be seen as a loose reference to the calling of the 12 disciples. The work can be seen to be similar thematically to some Biblical episodes, most clearly in "turn the tables" stories where the seemingly weaker side in a conflict miraculously comes out victorious anyway, with God's help.

The Infancy Gospel of Thomas and the Gospel of James were both popular sources on the young Jesus, despite the Church councils not including them in the New Testament canon. Jan N. Bremmer argues the Infancy Gospel of Thomas seems to have come first (c. 150–175 CE); the Gospel of James seems to date a little later (c. 175–185 CE).

The work is unusual in genre as the only work preserved out of antiquity that deals exclusively with the childhood of an individual. Other such works may have existed, but were not preserved if so. Tony Burke writes that in biographies of powerful figures in the Mediterranean region of the era that discussed the subject's childhood, it was a common point of praise to mark their childhood as already full of adult-like wisdom and authority. This could apply to gods and demigods such as Hermes and Hercules, but could also apply to human kings and holy figures such as Cyrus the Great or Moses.

Roman-era literature makes references to miracles originating from the IGT. For example, one version of the Acts of Andrew and Matthias, a heroic romance involving Christian missionaries on an adventure in a city of cannibals, includes explicit references to Jesus transforming the clay sparrows and resurrecting the child Zeno from the roof incident. They are simply stated as past deeds of Jesus. The History of Joseph the Carpenter, a 4th- or 5th-century Egyptian text, combines the story of Jesus healing a boy from a snakebite with the story of Jesus resurrecting a child who fell from a roof. The Acts of Christ and Peter in Rome includes the story of Jesus arguing with his teacher in a classroom, albeit in Rome rather than Galilee.

Two miracles of Jesus are recounted in the Quran. One of them is Jesus transforming clay into a bird, although it is described as just one bird, rather than twelve. The Quranic version has Jesus's breath animating the bird, rather than his word. (Note: See Quran 5:110 and Quran 3:49, in the surahs The Table Spread (Al-Ma'idah) and The Family of 'Imrân (Al-i-Imran).)

== Reception and audience ==
=== Classical reception ===
There is conflicting evidence of the gospel's status before the 7th century. Although the spread of manuscripts and casual mention of the miracles within suggest acceptance and popularity, the more explicit surviving written references are from disapproving theologians. Due to the comparatively large number of manuscripts for a work of this type, Reidar Aasgaard argues that there likely was not any explicit ecclesiastical censoring of the text. He does grant that it seems some later 6th and 7th century documents disapprove of allowing infancy gospels to be read, such as the Gelasian Decree and Anastasius Sinaita's Hodegos.

Though the depiction of Jesus in the work can be seen as shocking to later readers, Tony Burke writes that this view of Jesus was well-aligned with early Christian thought. For many Christians, tales of active use of divine power in everyday life held great appeal. Even when it is criticized, such as by John Chrysostom, it is on grounds of it contradicting the gospel of John's account of when the first miracle of Jesus was, not on grounds that the character of Jesus was incorrect. Stevan Davies argues that the work still seems to have been more popular with "ordinary" Christians than the educated church elite. This would place the work as part of folk religion and folk literature. J.R.C. Cousland sees the Jesus of the IGT as a subversive figure whose smashing of polite custom and the establishment would appeal to a popular audience, but get a more ambivalent reaction from Christian leaders after Christianity became an organized and majority religion itself. It is cautioned that a sharp distinction between an "elite" audience and a "common" audience did not yet exist in the era. As literacy was quite rare, works that were written down were inherently already only accessible to an educated minority, even if based on oral stories.

Reidar Aasgaard suggests that the compiler, the legends, or both may have credibly been from or circulated in a rural, non-elite milieu, and could have had children as an intended audience, making the work an early example of a children's story. Ursula Ulrike Kaiser speculated that parents of children might have been the main audience, relieved to read stories that even Jesus misbehaved, had fights with other children, broke household goods, and disputed with his teachers.

=== Medieval reception ===
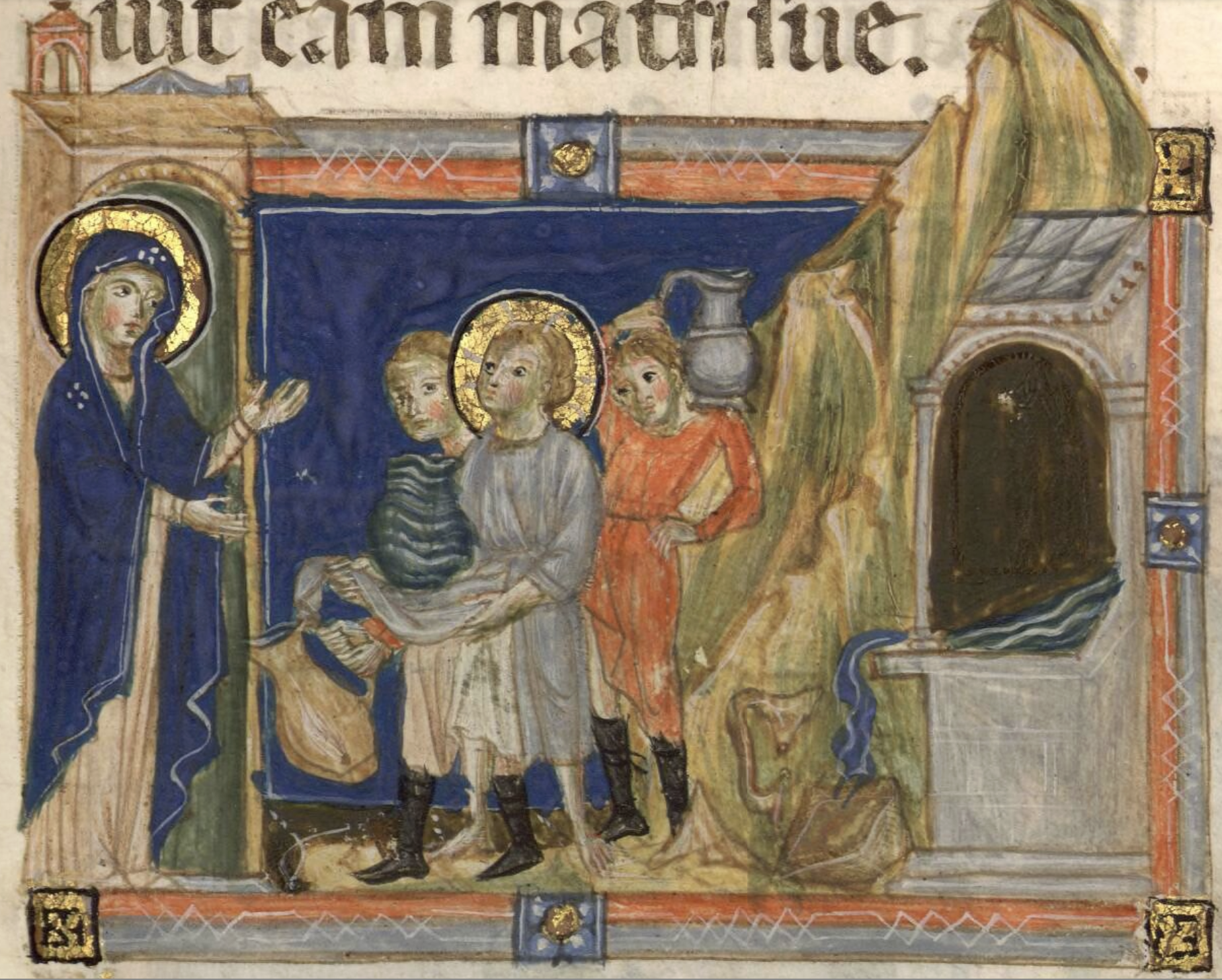
Young Jesus presents Mary with a large, pitcher-shaped mass of water miraculously resting on his garment. From a 13th-century illustrated Italian manuscript of the Gospel of Pseudo-Matthew.

The many surviving medieval manuscripts attest to the general popularity of the work. Philip Jenkins writes that the Infancy Gospel of Thomas appears to have been among the most popular Christian writings for 1500 years. The many copies of it and the Gospel of Pseudo-Matthew found in monastery libraries suggest it was used devotionally. As an example, a copy was held by the noblewoman Cecily Neville, known for her piety.

A probable reference to the story is found in Life of the Virgin, a 7th-century story that survives only in Georgian. According to the text, it is a translation of a Greek story from Palestine. It includes a condemnation of an infancy gospel called The Infancy of Christ that might have been a lost compilation including the IGT, saying that "it is alien to the order of the Church and contrary to what the holy evangelists said and an adversary of truth that was composed by some foolish men and storytellers."

The Byzantine historian George Syncellus mentions "the childhood deeds of our Savior" approvingly and implies that Luke the Evangelist was aware of the work and used it as a source for his gospel's account of Jesus in the temple at twelve, or at least referenced it. Vincent of Beauvais included details from the IGT in his book Speculum, although cautioned the authorship was unknown. Some medieval theologians condemned the infancy stories on account of them contradicting the gospels; Thomas Aquinas and Jean Gerson both harshly condemn them. These condemnations do not appear to have been enforced; the text was at its most popular in the 15th century in the Late Middle Ages.

=== Modern reception ===
The popularity of Pseudo-Matthew, one of the main ways late medieval audiences read the work, declined during the early modern period. In the era, scholars such as Erasmus showed that some writings attributed to Saint Jerome were forgeries created by others.

In general, reception in the modern era has been hostile. Christian writers in the 19th and 20th centuries, when it was assumed the work was an expurgated descendent of a heretical Gnostic work, were especially unimpressed; Anglican Bishop Charles Ellicott wrote in the 19th century that the story contained only "pious fraud and disguised heresy" and that "The language is unusually barbarous, the style hopelessly bad, and the narrative itself unconnected and incoherent."

Oscar Cullman was unimpressed with the depiction of Jesus in the work. He writes that if the name "Jesus" had not been included, the reader would never have guessed that the capricious boy depicted in the gospel was the same as the Jesus of the canonical gospels. Cullman says that "the cruder and more startling the miracle, the greater the pleasure the compiler finds in it." John P. Meier wrote that the "sinister super boy" Jesus belonged more in a horror movie than a gospel.

The book's reputation improved in the 21st century as consensus has shifted that it was not the work of 'heretics', and that rather it was the pious themselves who seemed most drawn to a tale of flashy miracles in everyday life, with verification that the God they worshipped was exceptional and powerful. Though the work's sense of ethics may not cohere with modern views, Reidar Aasgaard writes in its defense that it still complies with the old narrative law of "all's well that ends well". Everything turns out fine by the end in the story, which softens the problematic nature of Jesus's actions and invites a more sympathetic reading to Aasgaard.

== Analysis ==
=== The mischievous Jesus ===
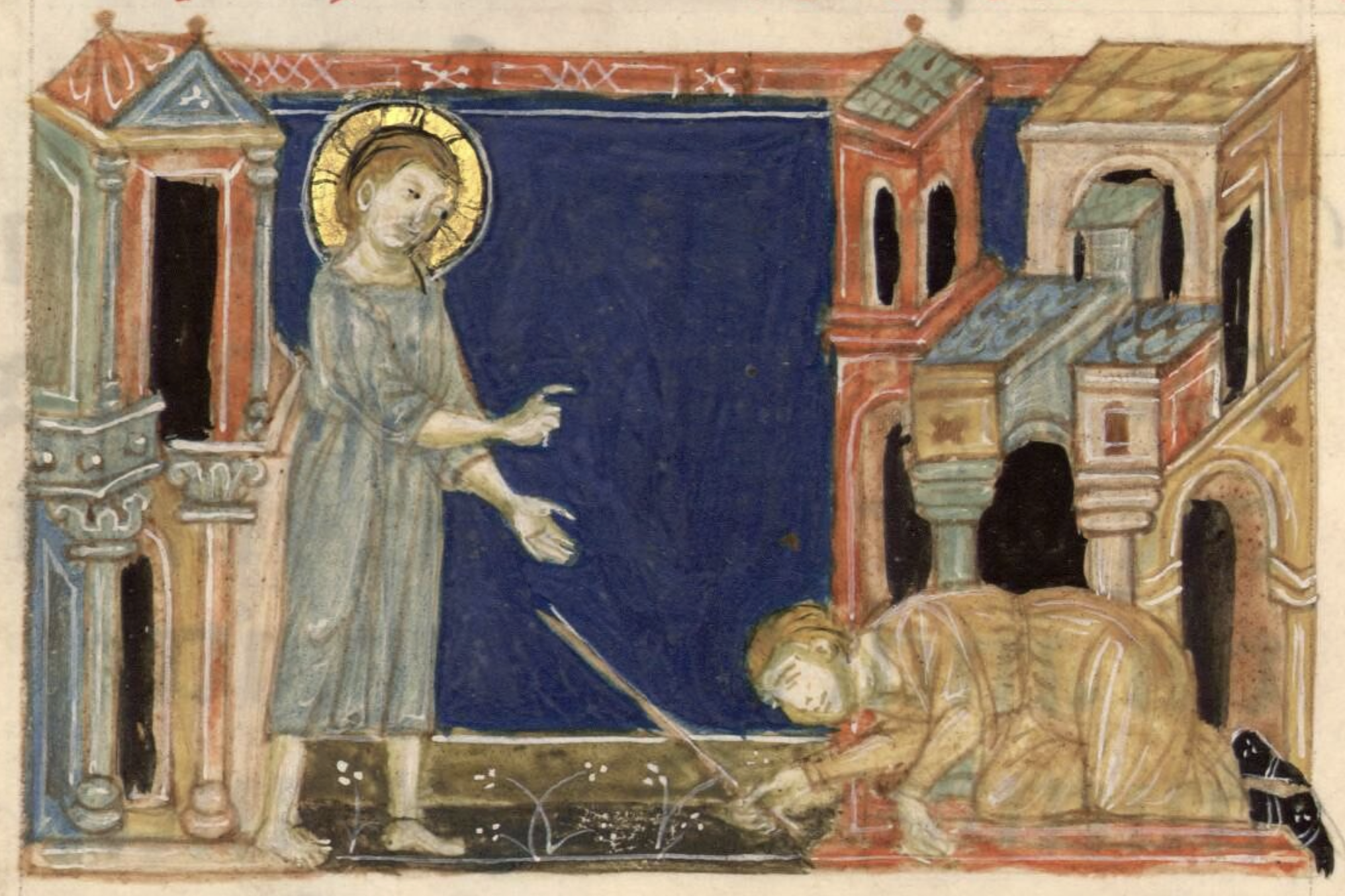
Young Jesus curses and kills a child

Somewhat later he [Jesus] was going through the village, and a child ran up and banged into his shoulder. Jesus was aggravated and said to him, "You will go no further on your way". Right away the child fell down and died.

— Infancy Gospel of Thomas (Greek A) 4:1

One element of the Infancy Gospel of Thomas found surprising to modern audiences is its depiction of a young Jesus who is rather petty. Jesus curses and kills those who cross him repeatedly in the work; perhaps the most striking is the incident where a five-year old Jesus curses and kills a child for the banal reason of running into him in what was presumably an accident, a cruel overreaction. The dead child's parents beg Joseph afterward to teach his child "to bless and not to curse". After Joseph scolds his son and asks him why he is making trouble for the family, Jesus responds by miraculously causing those who complained, the parents of the deceased, to be struck blind. Joseph scolds Jesus again, but seemingly ineffectually; the roles of parent and child are reversed. J.R.C. Cousland remarks that the chief moral lesson from these tales is "do not offend a powerful and angry god."

The story does have variants across manuscripts, seemingly motivated by a desire to better justify Jesus in it, rather than linguistic or translation difficulties. These revisions generally keep Jesus's behavior, but make the other child less sympathetic. For example, a version of the story in the Latin Gospel of Pseudo-Matthew adds that the other boy is a "henchman of injustice" and that he "threw himself on Jesus's shoulder, wanting to mock him or harm him if possible". One way that medieval readers might have interpreted the revised versions is that just as Jesus struggles against enemies of God as an adult in the canonical gospels, young Jesus is depicted as already contending with anti-divine forces via cursing them, even if they are also only children to match him.

=== Jesus's literacy ===
When Joseph observed the mind of the child and his age, and saw that he was starting to mature, he again resolved that he [Jesus] should not be unable to read, and so took him out and gave him over to another teacher.

— Infancy Gospel of Thomas (Greek A) 14:1

The story makes quite a strong emphasis on Jesus's education and his literacy, making it the subject of three separate stories. This is distinctive in that 1st-century Christians do not seem to have emphasized a literate Jesus; there is only a single story in the Gospel of Luke where Jesus writes (Jesus and the woman taken in adultery), and none in the other three canonical gospels. It seems that the idea of a literate Jesus became more prominent in the 2nd century, when the work was likely composed. A literate Jesus might also have served as an apologetic defense against possible pagan or Jewish attacks on Christianity as a religion of the uncultured. The pagan philosopher Celsus disparagingly called Jesus's early followers as "most uneducated" as an example of the rhetoric that some Christians might have sought to counter.

Although the story considers Jesus's education important, it also makes clear he does not actually need it, and in truth should already be the teacher himself even at a young age. The unwise second teacher who strikes his student would not have been uncommon for the classical era. The indoors setting is somewhat unusual, though; school buildings were rare, and education often happened outside. His first and third teacher are reduced to using "flattery" on young Jesus to get him to cooperate, which would be unusual and humiliating for a teacher to stoop to, but serves to emphasize how far superior Jesus is to Zacchaeus (the first teacher) and the third teacher.

=== Genre ===
Though the work is a gospel in the sense that it is about Jesus, it is of a different variety than the four gospels that are included in the canon of the New Testament. It contains few allusions or quotes to them, barring the sequence of Jesus at the Temple. Stephen Gero notes that only the Arabic Infancy Gospel version explicitly uses the word "gospel" itself within it, and suggests that the work was only intended to supplement and not supplant the canonical gospels. It might have been intended to have been read as a companion with them, notably the Gospel of Luke and possibly the Gospel of John.

Ronald Hock has argued that the work is best classified as an "ancient biography". Works about the childhood of Jesus have generally been called infancy gospels or infancy narratives, even when they extend to Jesus's early childhood as well beyond his birth and infancy.

One disputed matter is if the work was created by a compiler taking a variety of independent circulating stories as-is and making a written collection of them, or if an author crafted a unified narrative with a plot. In favor of the former, very similar stories are included, suggesting only the most token of editing. For example, Jesus disputes with three teachers in the gospel; this suggests the compiler possibly recording three different variants of the same story. In favor of the latter, scholars such as Tobias Nicklas, Stevan Davies, and J.R.C. Cousland argue that although the work is clearly episodic storytelling, it does have character development in showing Jesus gradually becoming the Savior depicted in the canonical gospels, as he seems to grow and use his powers more productively in the later stories. Others are skeptical; Hock writes that there is no such development or change in Jesus. This aspect can also differ by revision. Tony Burke notes that the Syriac version omits the healing miracles in chapters 10, 17, and 18 of Greek A, which weakens the idea of an implicit narrative where Jesus firms his character with age in the earlier, shorter versions.

Cousland argues that the work has a chiastic form, if imperfectly so, where the second half of the work is a response and correction to the first half.

=== Depiction of Jesus's family ===
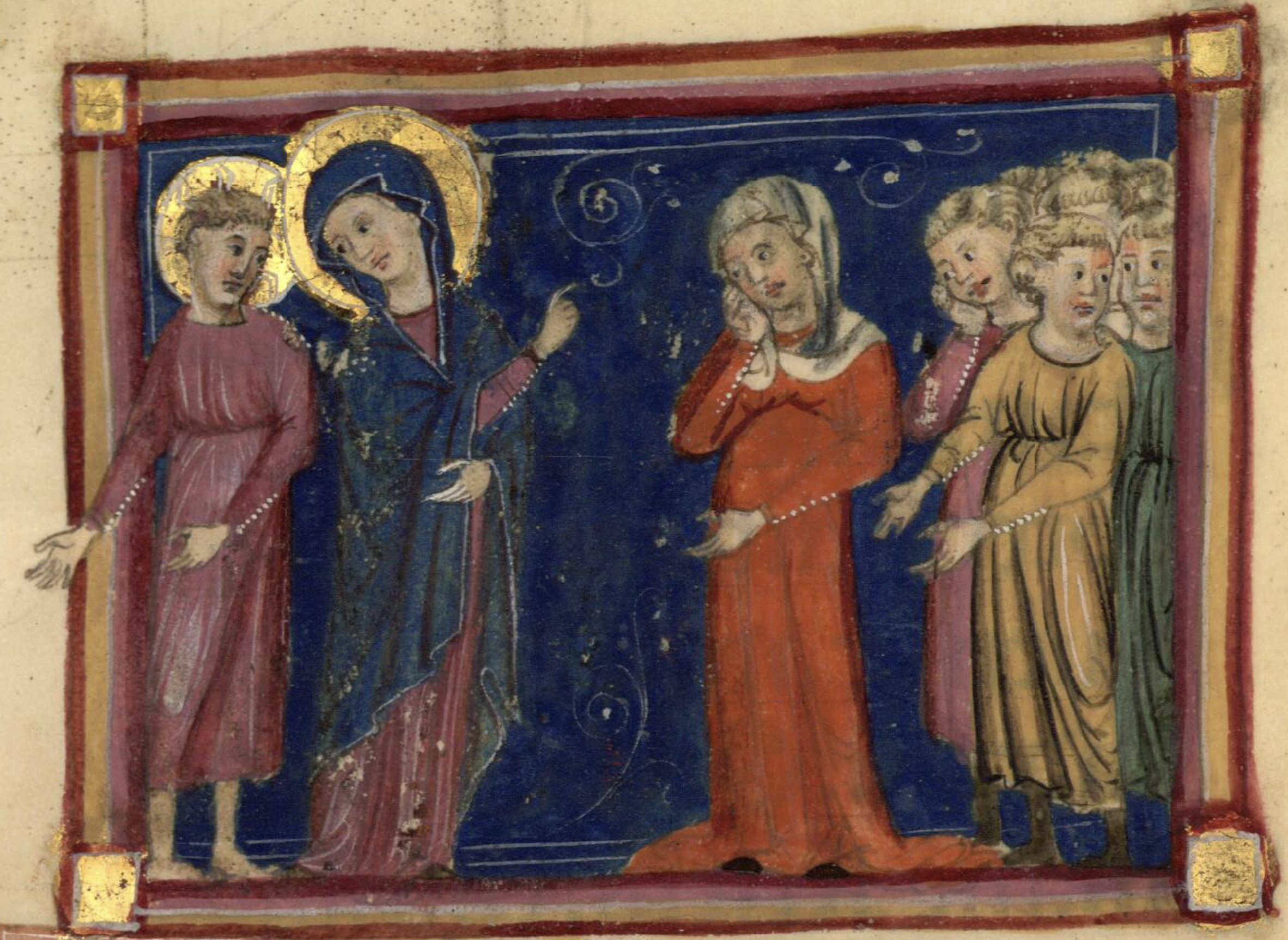
Jesus resurrecting a child he killed at his mother Mary's insistence. This Latin manuscript of Pseudo-Matthew expanded Mary's role by including her in the scene; in other versions, it is just Joseph here.

Joseph receives more attention in this work than many other Christian works, especially the preserved works of later eras. Mary has a comparatively minor role in the oldest versions of the text. The medieval manuscript tradition and its evolution is complex, but in general, later compilations including the IGT tended to pair the work with others that focused more on Mary and Mariology, in particular in the Latin-speaking Western Church. These compilations cover the Holy Family as a group; draw on the IGT for tales of Joseph; and also include stories of Jesus's grandparents Joachim and Anna, his aunt Mary Cleophas, and others. The Latin Gospel of Pseudo-Matthew appears to have begun incorporating the Infancy Gospel of Thomas stories in manuscripts in the 11th century. In contrast, the medieval Greek-speaking Byzantine Church tended to keep separate texts, each focused on one particular saint.

Though Joseph's role is prominent, he is not portrayed particularly positively in the Infancy Gospel of Thomas. He is not depicted as understanding his own son's divine nature, and to the extent that the message of the book is that Jesus is Lord and acknowledging this promptly is a sign of wisdom, he does not live up to this. Mary's role is minor, but she is portrayed unambiguously positively.

Both the IGT and the Gospel of James can be seen as "family gospels" where the audience could relate their own life and problems with Jesus's family. They could reassure themselves the Holy Family had just the same triumphs and troubles, if on a magnified scale.

== Art and culture ==
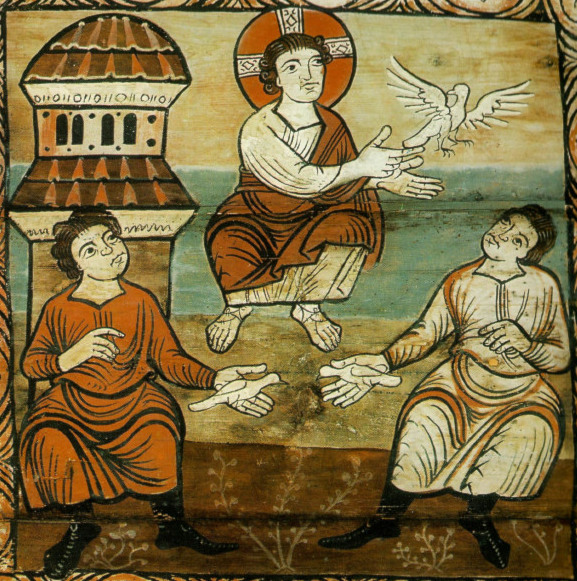
Jesus transforming clay into a bird; from 12th-century artwork on the ceiling of St. Martin's Church, Zillis

St. Martin's Church in Zillis, Switzerland was rebuilt in the 12th century. Its wooden ceiling features 153 panels of Romanesque paintings, of which 98 panels depict the life and miracles of Jesus. One panel shows young Jesus transforming clay into birds. The painter was probably familiar with the Gospel of Pseudo-Matthew, which incorporates material from the IGT and was likely the source for the panel.

A pictorial representation of the events of the Infancy Gospel of Thomas is in the 14th-century work Klosterneuburger Evangelienwerk, an illustrated gospel harmony. It used as sources German Christian literature (including sources containing material on Jesus's childhood that originated in the IGT), hagiographies of the Golden Legend, and the Latin Vulgate.

Sample episodes from Jesus's childhood as depicted in the Klosterneuburger Evangelienwerk, a 14th-century gospel translation:

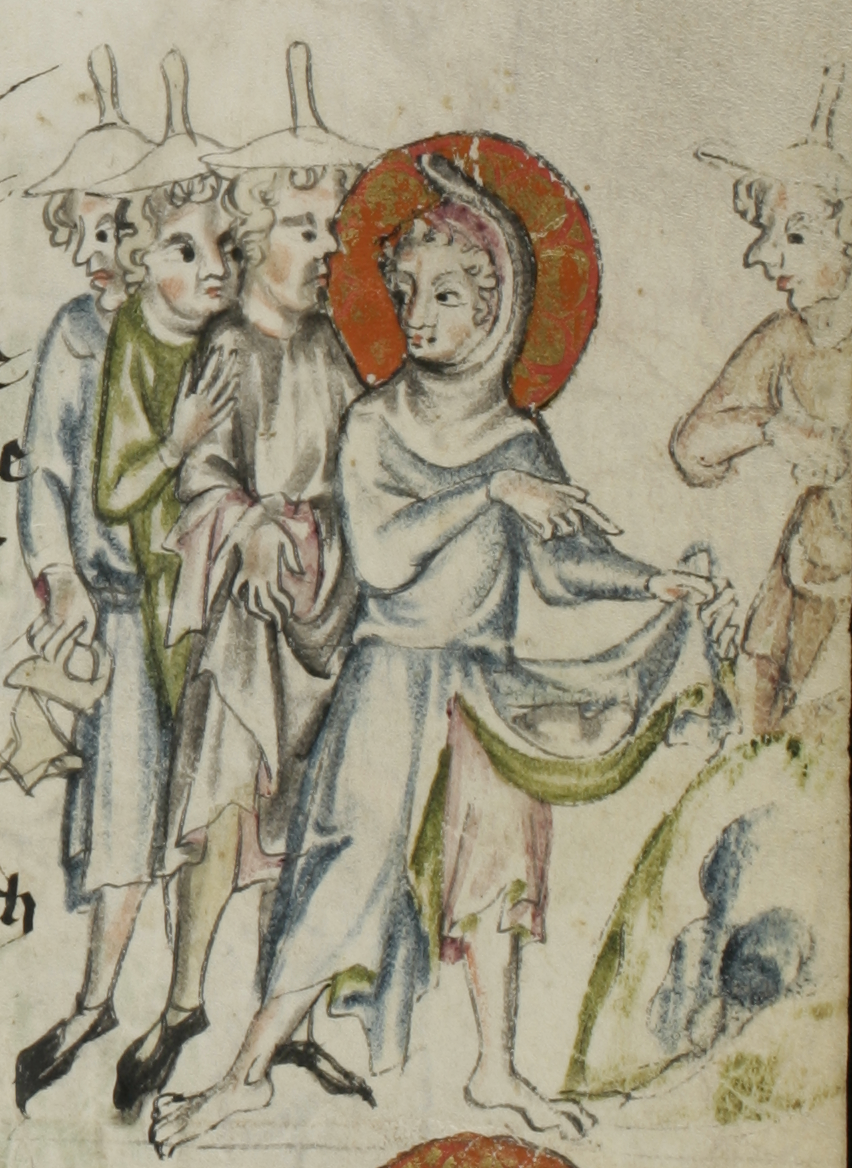
Jesus carrying water in his garment, after his jar was broken; other children watch in surprise.

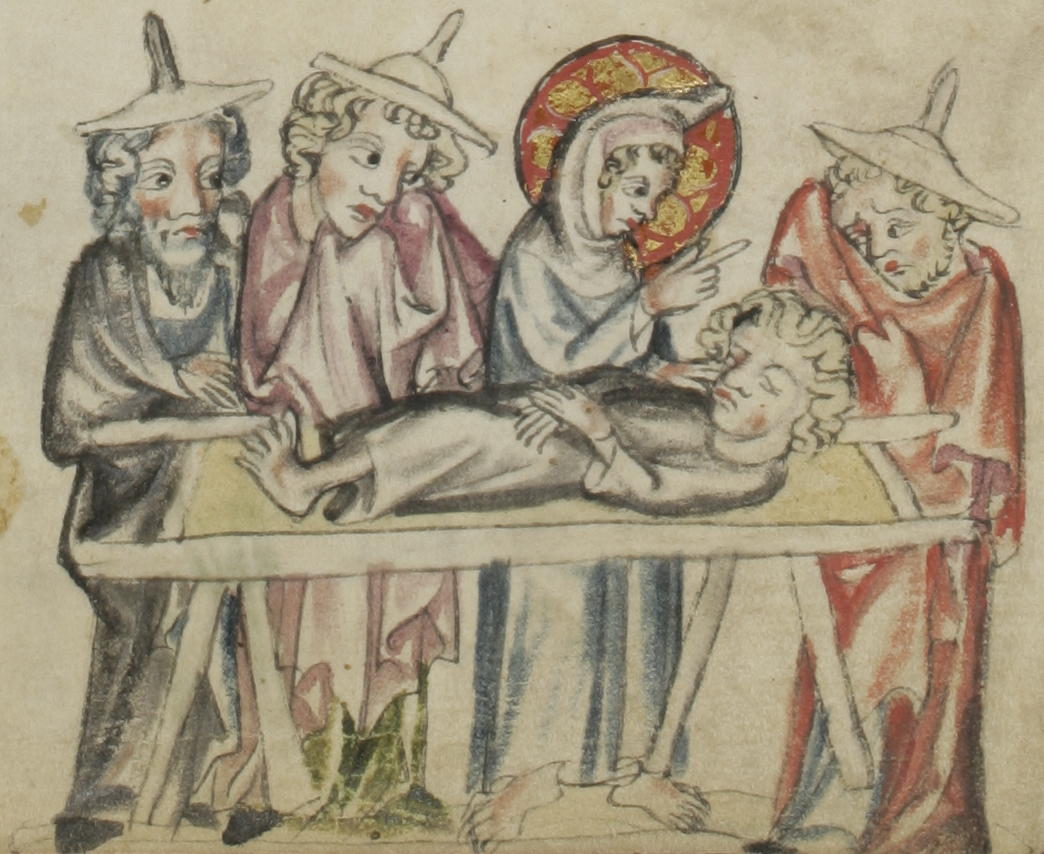
Jesus raises Zenon from the dead, so he can testify that Jesus is innocent.

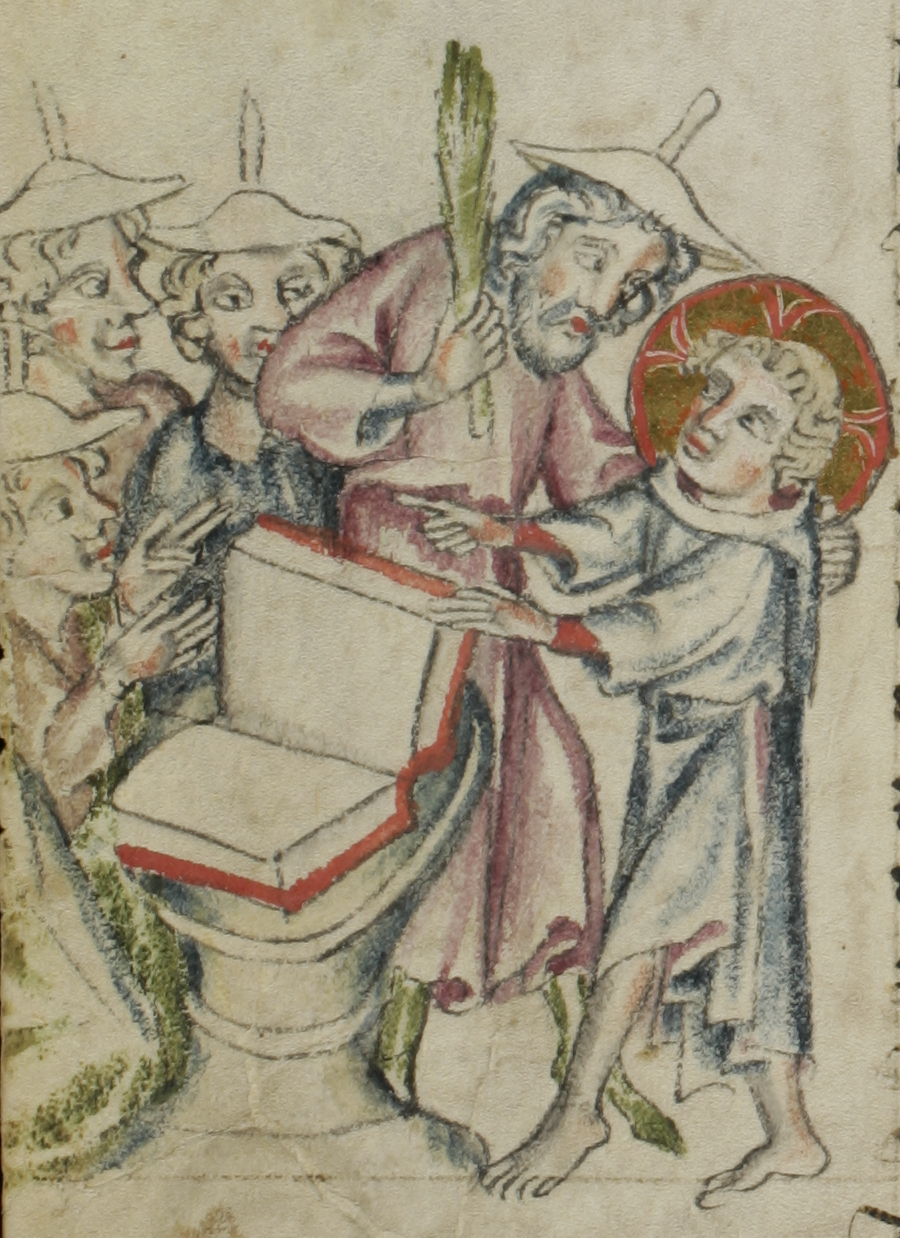
Jesus quarrels with his teacher in front of other pupils about the nature of the letters.

Anne Rice wrote Christ the Lord: Out of Egypt, a 2005 novel on Jesus's childhood; in it, she includes material from the IGT. Jesus transforms clay sparrows on the Sabbath, and kills another boy with stray words, although her version of Jesus rapidly decides to raise the other boy from the dead afterward. In the afterword, Rice writes that she found the accounts in the Infancy Gospel of Thomas and the Gospel of James compelling and containing a deep truth that spoke to her, despite their non-canonical status. The novel was adapted as the 2016 film The Young Messiah.

The Carpenter's Son is a 2025 psychological horror and drama film covering Jesus's early life; according to director Lotfy Nathan, it is inspired by the Infancy Gospel of Thomas.

== Contemporary translations ==
Selected modern translations of the Infancy Gospel of Thomas into English are listed below. Translations of the Greek and Latin versions include:

- Aasgaard, Reidar (2009). The Childhood of Jesus: Decoding the Apocryphal Infancy Gospel of Thomas. Cascade Books. pp. 233–242. ISBN 978-1-60608-126-6.
- Burke, Tony (2010). De Infantia Iesu Evangelium Thomae Graecae. Corpus Christianorum Series Apocryphorum 17. Brepols. pp. 302–463. ISBN 9782503534190.
- Ehrman, Bart; Pleše, Zlatko (2011). The Apocryphal Gospels: Texts and Translations. Oxford University Press. pp. 3–29. ISBN 978-0-19-973210-4.
- Elliott, James Keith (1993). The Apocryphal New Testament. Oxford University Press. pp. 68–83. ISBN 0-19-826182-9.
- Hock, Ronald (1995). The Infancy Gospels of James and Thomas. The Scholars Bible 2. Polebridge Press. pp. 103–143. ISBN 0-944344-47-X.

Translations of other languages include:

- Burke, Tony (2017). The Syriac Tradition of the Infancy Gospel of Thomas. Gorgias Eastern Christian Studies 48. Gorgias Press. pp. 123–227. ISBN 978-1-4632-0584-3. Includes a translation of an Arabic version by Slavomír Čéplö (pp. 229–243). (Syriac, Arabic)
- Cielontko, David; Halama, Ota (2025). "The Old Czech Version of the Infancy Gospel of Thomas". In Cielontko, David; Nicklas, Tobias; Bremmer, Jan N. (eds.). The Infancy Gospel of Thomas. Early Christian Apocrypha 23. Peeters. pp. 185–206. ISBN 978-90-429-5402-1. (IGT content in Old Czech versions of the Gospel of Pseudo-Matthew)
- Davis, Stephen J. (2014). Christ Child: Cultural Memories of a Young Jesus. Yale University Press. pp. 205–210. ISBN 978-0-300-14945-6. (Chapters 36–53 of the Arabic Gospel of the Infancy; see also pp. 199–204 for a translation of Greek S)
- Herbert, Máire; McNamara, Martin (2001). "A Versified Narrative of the Childhood Deeds of the Lord Jesus". Apocrypha Hiberniae: Evangelia infantiae, Volume 1. Corpus Christianorum Series Apocryphorum 13. Brepols. pp. 443–483. ISBN 9782503410005. (Old Irish)
- Shoemaker, Stephen J. (2025). "The Georgian Version of the Infancy Gospel of Thomas: Text and Translation". In Cielontko, David; Nicklas, Tobias; Bremmer, Jan N. (eds.). The Infancy Gospel of Thomas. Early Christian Apocrypha 23. Peeters. pp. 169–184. ISBN 978-90-429-5402-1. (Old Georgian)
- Syroyid, Dariya (2025). "The Infancy Gospel of Thomas in Ukrainian Manuscripts: Peculiarities in Interpretation". In Cielontko, David; Nicklas, Tobias; Bremmer, Jan N. (eds.). The Infancy Gospel of Thomas. Early Christian Apocrypha 23. Peeters. pp. 147–168. ISBN 978-90-429-5402-1. (Church Slavonic, Ukrainian versions)

Transcriptions of untranslated Greek, Latin, Syriac, and Slavonic versions can be found at:

- Evangelia apocrypha (1876 second edition), Tischendorf's compilation of apocrypha including the Greek A (pages 140–157), Greek B (pp. 158–163), and Latin (pp. 164–180) versions of the Infancy Gospel of Thomas
- Contributions to the apocryphal literature of the New Testament, collected and edited from Syriac manuscripts in the British Museum (1865), William Wright's transcription of a 6th century Syriac manuscript (pp. 128–121, right-to-left)
- Rosén, Thomas (1997). The Slavonic Translation of the Apocryphal Infancy Gospel of Thomas. AUUSSU 39. Almqvist & Wiksell International. pp. 48–97. ISBN 91-554-3964-0.

== Bibliography ==
- Aasgaard, Reidar (2009). The Childhood of Jesus: Decoding the Apocryphal Infancy Gospel of Thomas. Cascade Books. ISBN 978-1-60608-126-6.
- Burke, Tony (2010). De Infantia Iesu Evangelium Thomae Graecae. Corpus Christianorum Series Apocryphorum 17. Brepols. ISBN 9782503534190.
- Burke, Tony (2016). "The Infancy Gospel of Thomas (Syriac): A new translation and introduction". In Burke, Tony; Landau, Brent (eds.). New Testament Apocrypha: More Noncanonical Scriptures. Vol. 1. Eerdmans. ISBN 9780802872890.
- Burke, Tony (2017). The Syriac Tradition of the Infancy Gospel of Thomas. Gorgias Eastern Christian Studies 48. Gorgias Press. ISBN 978-1-4632-0584-3.
- Cielontko, David; Nicklas, Tobias; Bremmer, Jan N., eds. (2025). The Infancy Gospel of Thomas. Early Christian Apocrypha 23. Peeters. ISBN 978-90-429-5402-1.
  - Aasgaard, Reidar (2025). "The Infancy Gospel of Thomas: Past, Present, and Future Directions in Research". In Cielontko, David; Nicklas, Tobias; Bremmer, Jan N. (eds.). The Infancy Gospel of Thomas. Early Christian Apocrypha 23. Peeters. pp. 1–26. ISBN 978-90-429-5402-1.
  - Bremmer, Jan N. (2025). "The Infancy Gospel of Thomas: Date, Provenance, Readership, Education, Literacy, and Sitz im Leben". In Cielontko, David; Nicklas, Tobias; Bremmer, Jan N. (eds.). The Infancy Gospel of Thomas. Early Christian Apocrypha 23. Peeters. pp. 27–52. ISBN 978-90-429-5402-1.
  - Cielontko, David (2025). "Flattery in Jesus's Education in the Infancy Gospel of Thomas". In Cielontko, David; Nicklas, Tobias; Bremmer, Jan N. (eds.). The Infancy Gospel of Thomas. Early Christian Apocrypha 23. Peeters. pp. 75–95. ISBN 978-90-429-5402-1.
  - Kaiser, Ursula Ulrike (2025). "How to Deal with the Cursing Jesus: Observations Regarding the Textual Transmission of IGT 4–5". In Cielontko, David; Nicklas, Tobias; Bremmer, Jan N. (eds.). The Infancy Gospel of Thomas. Early Christian Apocrypha 23. Peeters. pp. 97–114. ISBN 978-90-429-5402-1.
  - Nicklas, Tobias (2025). "Elements of a Narratival Plot About the Child Jesus in The Infancy Gospel of Thomas (Codex Sabaiticus 259, folios 66r–77v (H))". In Cielontko, David; Nicklas, Tobias; Bremmer, Jan N. (eds.). The Infancy Gospel of Thomas. Early Christian Apocrypha 23. Peeters. pp. 53–73. ISBN 978-90-429-5402-1.
- Cousland, J. R. C. (2017). Holy Terror: Jesus in the Infancy Gospel of Thomas. Bloomsbury Publishing. ISBN 978-0-567-66817-2.
- Davies, Stevan (2009). The Infancy Gospels of Jesus: Apocryphal Tales from the Childhoods of Mary and Jesus. SkyLight Paths Publishing. ISBN 978-1-59473-258-4.
- Davis, Stephen J. (2014). Christ Child: Cultural Memories of a Young Jesus. Yale University Press. ISBN 978-0-300-14945-6.
- Dzon, Mary (2017). The Quest for the Christ Child in the Later Middle Ages. Middle Ages Series. University of Pennsylvania Press. ISBN 978-0812293708.
- Ehrman, Bart; Pleše, Zlatko (2011). The Apocryphal Gospels: Texts and Translations. Oxford University Press. ISBN 978-0-19-973210-4.
- Gero, Stephen (1971). "The Infancy Gospel of Thomas: A Study of the Textual and Literary Problems". Novum Testamentum. 13 (1): 46–80. doi:10.2307/1560167. JSTOR 1560167.
- Hock, Ronald (1995). The Infancy Gospels of James and Thomas. The Scholars Bible 2. Polebridge Press. ISBN 0-944344-47-X.
- Vukovic, Marijana (2022). Survival and Success of an Apocryphal Childhood of Jesus: Reception of the Infancy Gospel of Thomas in the Middle Ages. Studies of the Bible and Its Reception 21. De Gruyter. ISBN 9783110752786.
