= Acts of Christ and Peter in Rome =

Christian apocryphal text

The Acts of Christ and Peter in Rome (also known as the Acta fabulosa of St. Peter, the Slavonic Acts of Peter, and the Slavonic Life of Peter) is a work of New Testament apocrypha. The narrative details the journey of an elderly apostle Peter to Rome accompanied by Jesus Christ, who appears disguised as a mysterious youth, a ship's captain, and as a child slave. Together, they perform miracles, convert Roman citizens, and contend with the emperor Nero. The story ends in Peter's crucifixion and a miracle where an olive tree spontaneously grows to mark the spot of Peter's death. The work is preserved in distinct Greek and Church Slavonic recensions.

== Date and authorship ==
The author of the Acts of Christ and Peter in Rome is unknown. Some elements of the work suggest either a monastic origin or an author influenced by stories that originated from monasteries. The location of composition is also unknown, although Roman Syria and Roman Egypt have both been weakly suggested as consistent with the work. The work is similar to other literature of the acts of the apostles believed to date to c. 4th–6th centuries such as the Acts of Andrew and Matthias and the Acts of Thomas and the Wonder-Working Skin, but there is no certain date of authorship. The oldest known manuscript is from the 14th century as a terminus ante quem.

== Content ==
The narrative begins with the elderly apostle Peter (aged 124 in Greek, 130 in Slavonic) living as a hermit in a cave on Mount Salmonion (Slavonic: Salim) near Damascus. He fasts and survives on a strict diet, eating only dates on Sundays. On Pentecost, Jesus Christ appears to him in the form of a beautiful youth carrying a staff. Christ delivers a letter instructing Peter to travel to Rome, warning him that he will be martyred there, and gives him the staff.

Peter travels to the coast and boards a ship. The skipper of the vessel is Christ in disguise in Greek, and the archangel Michael in Slavonic. During a violent storm at sea, the skipper blames Peter's faith, prompting Peter to pray and confess his past denial of Christ. The storm is miraculously calmed. Impressed, the skipper requests baptism and receives the name Krataios (Slavonic: Regent). During the baptism, a pillar of light appears and angels sing, leading forty (Slavonic: four hundred) observers to also be baptized.

The skipper then sells a child slave to Peter to assist him in Rome. The child is actually Christ, though Peter does not realize this. In the Greek version, a formal deed of sale cedes the child "Messiah" for twelve gold pieces. (Some Slavonic versions omit the deed.)

Upon arriving in Rome, the child slave performs several public miracles: silencing unclean spirits in a possessed woman who recognizes him, miraculously creating twelve thousand coins (Slavonic: catching twelve thousand fish) for the poor, and causing a dried fish to walk on dry land. Fearing they will be stoned as sorcerers, Peter is hesitant, but the child encourages him.

Peter sells the child to a wealthy Roman named Aribastos (Slavonic: Aravist) for fifty gold pieces. Aribastos sends the child to school, but the child refuses to answer basic questions, instead questioning the schoolmaster on cosmology, anatomy, and the resurrection, leaving the teacher to declare that only God possesses such wisdom. At midnight, Aribastos and his wife witness angels serving the child and singing the Trisagion (Slavonic: Cherubikon) hymn, prompting the baptism of their household of nine hundred (Slavonic: one thousand) people.

Emperor Nero orders Peter's arrest due to his preaching. The child appears in Nero's council chamber to defend the apostle. When a guard strikes the child, the guard's hand immediately withers, the earth shakes, and several dead are temporarily resurrected.

Nero sentences Peter to be crucified at the "Theater of the Nations". Peter requests to be crucified upside down because he deems himself unworthy to die in the same manner as Christ. In the Slavonic version, the nails fall from Peter's body when Christ appears. Christ reveals his true identity to Peter. Peter dies, and a post-mortem miracle occurs: in the Greek recension, his cross grows into a living olive tree; in the Slavonic recension, an olive tree sprouts where Peter's blood fell. The martyrdom is recorded as occurring on June 29.

== Manuscripts ==
The text survives in two major recensions. The Greek recension is preserved in a single late 16th- or early 17th-century manuscript, Vatican Library, Ferrajoli 830 (f. 33–50), designated as F.

The second recension is in Church Slavonic, which is categorized into two groups: a long recension and a short recension. The long recension is similar to the Greek version. Manuscripts in it include W (Vienna, ÖNB, Cod. slav. 152, 14th century), S (Sofia, National Library, 309, 16th century), B (Belgrade, National Library of Serbia, 196, written in 1409, destroyed in 1941), and U (Moscow, State Historical Museum, Uvarov 323, 17th century). The short recension is generally thought to be later in creation and more likely to be independent adaptations. Manuscripts with it include z (Zagreb, Croatian Academy of Sciences and Arts, III.a.10, 16th century), n (Saint Petersburg, NLR, F. 893, 17th century), and s (Sofia, National Library, 684, 17th century).

Scholarly reviews have noted discrepancies in older manuscript catalogs. Several manuscripts claimed by Aurelio de Santos Otero to contain the work have been contested as actually preserving other texts.

The work was edited and translated into Italian by Mario Capaldo in 2002, and into English by Julia Snyder and Slavomír Čéplö in 2023.

== Analysis ==
The Acts of Christ and Peter in Rome draws on several early Christian literary traditions and genres. It is most directly a part of the literary genre of Acts of the Apostles that told heroic stories of the Apostolic Age. The Acts of Andrew and Matthias also involves apostles taking a boat trip with Jesus in disguise as the captain with angels in disguise as the crew for one similar example. The motif of an apostle being sold with a deed of sale parallels the Acts of Thomas and the Acts of Thomas and the Wonder-Working Skin where Thomas is sold similarly, though here the roles are reversed, and Christ is the one sold.

Peter's depiction also shares similarities with Late Antique hagiographies of ascetic hermits and monks, which emphasized their healthy lives, ability to live on little food, and so on. This can be seen in works such as the tales of Saint Anthony or the monks described in Lausiac History.

The staff given by Christ to Peter at the beginning of the story is not identified. However, Jewish-Christian legends regarding the fate of the staff of Moses existed at the time and might have influenced the mention of the staff. According to them, the staff passed through various biblical figures onto the Messiah.

The work suggests a "polymorphic" Christology, with Christ simultaneously or sequentially taking three distinct forms: the youth on the mountain, the ship captain, and the child slave.

The Acts of Christ and Peter in Rome shares commonalities with infancy gospels in genre. While the story takes place long after Jesus's human childhood, he is depicted as a miracle-working child who assists and sometimes worries an elderly guardian (Peter), which is structurally identical to the role Joseph plays in stories of Jesus's childhood. The school scene is a direct adaptation of school scenes from the Infancy Gospel of Thomas.

== Bibliography ==
- Snyder, Julia A.; Čéplö, Slavomír (2023). "The Acts of Christ and Peter in Rome: A New Translation and Introduction". In Burke, Tony (ed.). New Testament Apocrypha: More Noncanonical Scriptures. Vol. 3. Eerdmans. pp. 435–464. ISBN 978-0-8028-7793-2.
- Capaldo, Mario (2002). "Tradizione greca e slava degli Acta fabulosa di san Pietro (BHG 1485f)" [The Greek and Slavic tradition of the Acta fabulosa of Saint Peter]. Rivista di studi bizantini e neoellenici (in Italian) (39): 93–143.
