= Patrophilus =

Patrophilus can refer to a number of people:

- Patrophilus of Scythopolis, 4th century bishop of Asia Minor
- Patrophilus, son of 4th century bishop Athenogenes of Pedachtoë
