= Ursula Ulrike Kaiser =

German scholar of Christianity (born 1971)

Ursula Ulrike Kaiser (born 1971) is a German Protestant university professor and scholar of religion. Her interests include Christian theology, the New Testament and New Testament apocrypha, early Christianity, and Gnosticism.

== Biography ==
Kaiser was born in Dresden, East Germany in 1971. She graduated from Martin-Andersen-Nexö-Gymnasium there in 1990. She studied at the Humboldt University of Berlin and the University of Bern from 1990–1999, and earned degrees in modern German literature and Protestant theology. From 1999 to 2005, she was a research assistant in the New Testament department of the Theology Department at Humboldt University of Berlin, working with Hans-Gebhard Bethge, while conducting her doctorate studies. Bethge is a scholar of Gnosticism, and the two were co-editors on the first publication of a translation of the full Nag Hammadi library from Coptic into German. She earned her PhD in 2005. She was ordained as a pastor in 2008 by the Evangelical Church Berlin - Brandenburg - Silesian Upper Lusatia (EBKO). From 2009 to 2016, she was a research assistant at the Institute for New Testament Studies at the University of Hamburg, working with Christine Gerber and completing her habilitation there. In 2012, she published translations into German of two apocryphal works: the Infancy Gospel of Thomas and the History of Joseph the Carpenter. She acquired a role as a professor of biblical theology at TU Braunschweig in Lower Saxony in 2019, where she worked until 2023. Since 2023, she has served at the University of Jena as a professor of the New Testament, where she is chair of the department.

Her research interests include the use and interpretations of metaphors in the New Testament and in theology; the Gospel of John; New Testament apocrypha; and the Nag Hammadi library, Coptic language, and Gnosticism. Since 2023, she has served on the editorial board of Berliner Theologische Zeitschrift, a journal on theology and the history of religion.

Kaiser is married and the mother of two children.

== Selected works ==
- Die Hypostase der Archonten. (Nag-Hammadi-Codex II,4) (Texte und Untersuchungen zur Geschichte der altchristlichen Literatur. Archiv für die Ausgabe der griechischen christlichen Schriftsteller der ersten Jahrhunderte, Band 156). De Gruyter, Berlin 2006, ISBN 3-11-019071-0 (publication of her 2005 PhD dissertation).
- Die Rede von „Wiedergeburt“ in Neuen Testament. Ein metapherntheoretisch orientierter Neuansatz nach 100 Jahren Forschungsgeschichte (Wissenschaftliche Untersuchungen zum Neuen Testament, Band 413). Mohr Siebeck, Tübingen 2018, ISBN 3-16-155340-3 (publication of her 2016 habilitation thesis).
- with Ulrike Lenz, Evamaria Simon, Martin Steinhäuser: Handbuch für die Praxis (Gott im Spiel. Godly Play weiterentwickelt, Band 1). Calwer Verlag, Stuttgart 2018, ISBN 3-7668-4458-X.
- Neutestamentliche Exegese kompakt: Eine Einführung in die wichtigsten Methoden und Hilfsmittel. Mohr Siebeck, Tübingen 2022, ISBN 9783825259846 (10.36198/9783838559841)
