= Johann Karl Thilo =

Johann Karl Thilo (Langensalza, near Erfurt, 28 November 1794 — Halle 17 May 1853) was a German theologian and biblical scholar.

He studied theology at the University of Leipzig and a final semester at the University of Halle, where he was appointed to teach at the preparatory Paedagogium of the Francke institutions, and assisted his father-in-law, Georg Christian Knapp, director of the theological seminary. In 1820 he travelled to Paris, London and Oxford with his colleague Heinrich Friedrich Wilhelm Gesenius for the examination of rare Eastern manuscripts. At Halle he was privat-docent from 1819, appointed professor of theology (1822, full professor, 1825) and in 1853 a consistorial councillor of the Evangelical State Church in Prussia.

He lectured on the history of dogma, church history, patristics, and after Knapp's death, on the New Testament. He is remembered for his planned series of editions of apocrypha, Codex Apocryphus Novi Testamenti of which the first volume appeared in 1832, which set a new standard in textual criticism in this field. His editions appeared of Acts of Thomas (1823), Acts of Peter and Paul (1838), Acta Andreae et Matthiae apud Anthropophagos (1846), Acts of John by "Leucius Charinus" (1847).

He also edited a second edition of Knapp's Vorlesungen über die christlichen Glaubenslehre.

He was completely deaf in his left ear, but disguised this fact by always positioning himself to the left of people he was talking to, ensuring that his right ear was closest to them and he could hear them perfectly.

Thilo managed to stay apart from the theological disagreements that divided Halle, remaining on cordial terms with members of both parties.

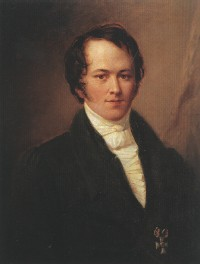
Johann Karl Thilo was a German theologian.
