= Tobias Nicklas =

German scholar of Christianity (born 1967)

Tobias Nicklas (born 9 August, 1967) is a German professor of the New Testament at the University of Regensburg.

== Biography ==
Nicklas was born in Burglengenfeld, Bavaria, West Germany on 9 August, 1967. He studied mathematics and Catholic theology at the University of Regensburg for his education, beginning in 1987. He began his doctoral program at Regensburg in 1997, which he completed in December 2000 with a doctorate in theology with Hubert Ritt as his advisor. He finished his habilitation in June 2004, and was appointed a lecturer at Regensburg in September 2004. He acquired work as an associate professor at Radboud University Nijmegen in April 2005 in the New Testament, and worked there until 2007. In 2007, he returned to Regensburg where he had spent so many years in study after acquiring a full professorship there. He teaches the New Testament and its exegesis in the Faculty of Catholic Theology. He has also worked as a visiting professor and research associate at various colleges and universities, and is as of 2026 a research fellow at the Department of the New Testament at the University of the Free State.

In 2018, Regensburg established the Centre for Advanced Studies "Beyond Canon" project, with support from the German Research Foundation. Nicklas serves as its director, and it funds research by various academics into biblical apocrypha and the wider world of Early Christianity and medieval Christianity, including folk religion. One of the core messages from its research was that the boundaries between the canonical and "parabiblical" traditions were not fixed, and authority and recognition came from both among Christians.

Nicklas has served as co-editor of Novum Testamentum Patristicum, a scholarly book series published by Brill, and Wissenschaftliche Untersuchungen zum Neuen Testament, a long-running series published by Mohr Siebeck.

Nicklas married his wife Eva in 1994; the two have four children together.

== Research ==
Nicklas has researched and published on Johannine literature, works in the New Testament attributed to the apostle John and related Johannine communities, including the Book of Revelation.

He has also published on biblical apocrypha as well as Hellenistic Deuterocanonical books included in the Septuagint. In particular, he has published notable research on the Gospel of Peter and the Apocalypse of Peter.

== Selected works ==
Selected publications written by Nicklas include:

- Hieke, Thomas; Nicklas, Tobias (2003). Die Worte der Prophetie dieses Buches: Offenbarung 22, 6-21 als Schlussstein der christlichen Bibel Alten und Neuen Testaments gelesen [The Words of Prophecy in this Book: Revelation 22:6-21, read as the keystone of the Christian Bible, both Old and New Testaments]. BThSt 62 (in German). Neukirchen-Vluyn: Neukirchener Theologie. ISBN 978-3788720056.
- Kraus, Thomas J.; Nicklas, Tobias (2004). Das Petrusevangelium und die Petrusapokalypse: Die griechischen Fragmente mit deutscher und englischer Übersetzung [The Gospel of Peter and the Apocalypse of Peter: The Greek Fragments with German and English Translation]. GCS N.F. 11 (in German). Berlin: De Gruyter. ISBN 978-3110176353.
- Nicklas, Tobias (2007). Einleitung in das Neue Testament [Introduction to the New Testament] (in German). (later reprinted and revised in 2010, 2015, 2017)
- Kraus, Thomas J.; Kruger, Michael J.; Nicklas, Tobias, eds. (2009). Gospel Fragments. Oxford Early Christian Gospel Texts. Oxford University Press. ISBN 9780199208159.
- Tomberg, Markus; Hotze, Gerhard; Nicklas, Tobias; Tück, Jan-Heiner (2009). Jesus begegnen: Zugänge zur Christologie [Encountering Jesus: Approaches to Christology] (in German). Herder. ISBN 978-3451296628.
- Nicklas, Tobias (2014). Jews and Christians? Second-Century 'Christian' Perspectives on the 'Parting of the Ways'. Mohr Siebeck. ISBN 978-3-16-167510-2.
- Nicklas, Tobias (2019). Der zweite Thessalonicherbrief [2 Thessalonians]. Kritisch-exegetischer Kommentar über das Neue Testament 10/2 (in German). Vandenhoeck & Ruprecht. ISBN 978-3525516393.
- Nicklas, Tobias (2020). Studien zum Petrusevangelium [Essays on the Gospel of Peter]. WUNT 453 (in German and English). ISBN 978-3-16-154061-5.
- Nicklas, Tobias (2024). The Canon and Beyond: Collected Essays on the History and Hermeneutics of Biblical and Parabiblical Traditions. WUNT 525. Mohr Siebeck. doi:10.1628/978-3-16-163757-5. ISBN 978-3-16-163757-5.
- Alkier, Stefan; Karakolis, Christos; Nicklas, Tobias (2024) [2021]. The Promise of Ecumenical Interpretation: Protestant, Catholic, Orthodox. Translated by Cerone, Jacob N.; Moffitt, David M. Fortress Press. ISBN 9798889831723. (translation of a 2021 German work, Sola Scriptura ökumenisch)

Monograph collections edited by Nicklas include:

- Nicklas, Tobias; Tilly, Michael, eds. (2003). The Book of Acts as Church History / Apostelgeschichte als Kirchengeschichte. BZNW 120. De Gruyter. ISBN 9783110906790.
- Kraus, Thomas J.; Nicklas, Tobias, eds. (2007). Das Evangelium nach Petrus: Text, Kontexte, Intertexte [The Gospel of Peter: Text, Context, Intertext]. Texte und Untersuchungen zur Geschichte der altchristlichen Literatur 158. De Gruyter. ISBN 978-3-11-019313-8.
- Reiterer, Friedrich V.; Nicklas, Tobias; Schopflin, Karin, eds. (2007). Angels: The Concept of Celestial Beings – Origins, Development and Reception. DCLY 2007. De Gruyter. ISBN 978-3-11-019294-0.
- Van den Berg, Jacob Albert; Kotzé, Annemaré; Nicklas, Tobias; Scopello, Madeleine, eds. (2010). In Search of Truth: Augustine, Manichaeism and other Gnosticism – Studies for Johannes van Oort at Sixty. Nag Hammadi and Manichaean Studies 74. Brill. ISBN 9789004195790.
- Kraus, Thomas J.; Nicklas, Tobias, eds. (2010). Early Christian Manuscripts: Examples of Applied Method and Approach. Texts and Editions for New Testament Study 5. Brill. ISBN 978-90-04-19434-2.
- Hieke, Thomas; Nicklas, Tobias, eds. (2011). The Day of Atonement: Its Interpretations in Early Jewish and Christian Traditions. Themes in Biblical Narrative 15. Brill. ISBN 978-90-04-21680-8.
- Bremmer, Jan N.; Karmann, Thomas R.; Nicklas, Tobias, eds. (2016). The Ascension of Isaiah. Studies on Early Christian Apocrypha 11. Peeters. ISBN 978-9042931992.
- Nicklas, Tobias; Moss, Candida; Tuckett, Christopher M.; Verheyden, Joseph, eds. (2017). The Other Side: Apocryphal Perspectives on Ancient Christian 'Orthodoxies'. Novum Testamentum Et Orbis Antiquus 117. Vandenhoeck & Ruprecht. ISBN 978-3525540589.
- Bremmer, Jan N.; Hirschberger, Veronika; Nicklas, Tobias, eds. (2018). Figures of Ezra. Studies on Early Christian Apocrypha 13. Peeters. ISBN 978-9042935303.
- Bremmer, Jan N.; Doole, J. Andrew; Karmann, Thomas R.; Nicklas, Tobias; Repschinski, Boris, eds. (2020). The Protevangelium of James. Early Christian Apocrypha 16. Peeters. ISBN 9789042939998.
- Cielontko, David; Nicklas, Tobias; Bremmer, Jan N., eds. (2025). The Infancy Gospel of Thomas. Early Christian Apocrypha 23. Peeters. ISBN 978-90-429-5402-1.
