= Codex Sabaiticus =

Collection of ancient Christian manuscripts

Codex Sabaiticus can refer to a number of ancient manuscripts, most of which are currently housed in the Patriarchal Library in Jerusalem, that were originally preserved by "Sabaite" monks from the monastery of Mar Saba in what is today the Bethlehem Governorate of Palestine, in the West Bank.

Each specific codex is denoted by a number, e.g. "Sabaiticus 242", but some authors may generically refer to any one of these as "Codex Sabaiticus".

These are mostly works on Christian subjects, but this corpus also contains some fragments on non-Christian subjects, such as the Greek mythological Agapenor.

== Cassian the Sabaite ==
Several codices are manuscripts relating to Cassian, a Sabaite monk of the 6th century. These include:

- Sabaiticus 8
- Sabaiticus 25
- Sabaiticus 76, c. 10th century
- Sabaiticus 157, c. 10th century
- Sabaiticus 365, c. 13th century
- Sabaiticus 393, c. 14th century
- Sabaiticus 407, c. 12th century
- Sabaiticus 576, c. 17th century
- Sabaiticus 633, c. 14th century

== Codex Hierosolymitanus ==
Several codices (such as Sabaiticus 13, 70, and 72) constitute the renowned Codex Hierosolymitanus, otherwise known as "Hierosolymitanus Sabaiticus", or, in the scholarly discourse, as "H".

== Sabaiticus 231 ==
Sabaiticus 231 contains scholia on the Psalms, attributed to Athanasius of Alexandria.

== Sabaiticus 232 ==
Sabaiticus 232 contains commentaries on the Gospel of Matthew by a number of writers: Origen, Theodore of Heraclea, Eusebius of Caesarea, John Chrysostom, Cyril of Alexandria, Severus of Antioch, Theodore of Mopsuestia, Gregory of Nyssa, and Photios I of Constantinople.

This volume is a codex mostly of parchment, with a few pages of linen paper, consisting of 240 folios. In the 15th century it was preserved in the Monastery of St. Gerasimus.

== Sabaiticus 242 ==
Sabaiticus 242 is a 10th-century manuscript that contains a hagiography of the 4th century Christian martyr named Athenogenes of Pedachtoë, attributed to Anysius.

== Sabaiticus 259 ==
Sabaiticus 259 is a manuscript of the 11th century containing Christian apocryphal books. According to writing in the codex (sometimes since copied over, yet still legible), it was commissioned by a kouboukleisios named Basil on Valva on the island of Cyprus. It was copied by a monk named Gerasimos in 1089 or 1090 according to the date of the colophon. At some point, it moved to the monastery of St. Nikolaos in Akrotiri, and then to Saint Gerasimos Monastery in Palestine (unrelated to the original copier). From there, it went to the Church of the Holy Sepulchre and then to the Monastery of Mar Saba from where it would get its modern name. Like many other such manuscripts from Mar Saba, it is now held at the library of the Greek Patriarchate of Jerusalem.

It is the oldest known manuscript containing a full version of the Greek Infancy Gospel of Thomas (a fragmentary version from the 4th or 5th century also exists). It contains a version of the story likely dating to a period some time between the 4th and 7th centuries CE. This version is classified as its own unique recension, called "Greek S" or "Gs", of which it is the only complete witness to it.

This volume is a codex of parchment consisting of 317 folios, measuring 260 by 212 millimeters. The codex is slightly damaged, but only minimally so: 19 folios are missing, and a few folios have holes or missing columns.

== Sabaiticus 261 ==
Sabaiticus 261 is a manuscript of a hagiography of Saint Nicholas by Byzantine historian Nikephoros Kallistos Xanthopoulos, titled Narration in Iambic Verses of St Nicholas' Miracles. It is the longest known piece of hagiography in verse.

== Sabaiticus 366 ==
Sabaiticus 366 is a tract by 5th century monk Marcus Eremita against Nestorianism, dating to the 13th century, titled Against those who say that the flesh of the Lord is not united to the Word, but that it is merely worn like a garment, and that, for this reason, there is a difference between him who carries and that which is carried (often shortened to "Against the Nestorians").

It is also the source of some short biographical material about Euphratas, eunuch architect under the Roman Emperor Constantine the Great.

== Sabaiticus 429 ==
Sabaiticus 429 is a manuscript dated to 1619 that is a recitation of ideas and concepts from the Old and New Testaments in question and answer form, titled Questionnaires (Ἐρωταποκρίσεις. Ποίημα κὺρ Λέοντος τοῦ σοφοῦ). It is attributed to the 9th and 10th century Byzantine Emperor Leo VI the Wise, but scholars believe it was written pseudonymously. An edition of this work was published by N. Krasnoselčev in 1899.
