= Georg Christian Knapp =

German Protestant theologian

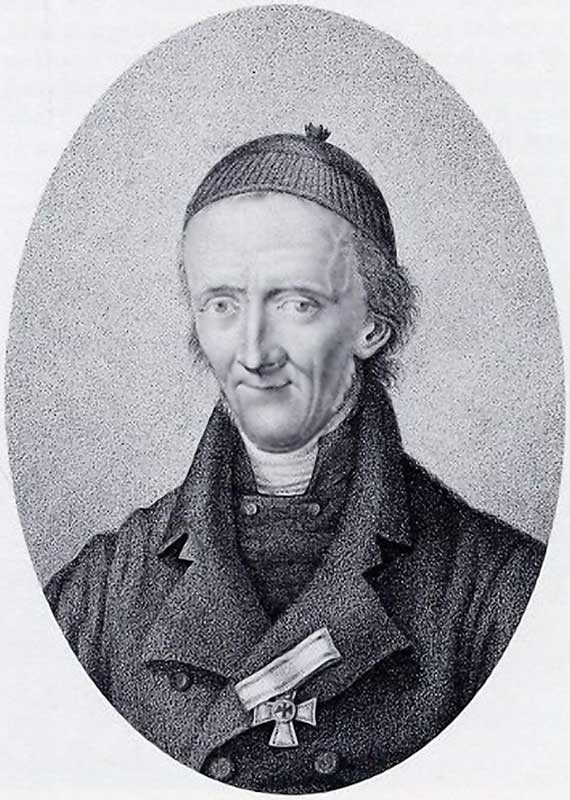
Georg Christian Knapp.

Georg Christian Knapp (17 September 1753 – 14 October 1825) was a German Protestant theologian.

== Biography ==
He was born in Glaucha, now a part of Halle, and received his early education in the orphan school at Halle (German: Franckesche Stiftungen), of which his father was director. He later studied theology at the Universities of Halle and Göttingen. In 1777 he was an associate professor at Halle, where in 1782 he became a full professor of theology. In 1785 he was appointed Kondirektor of the Franckesche Stiftungen (Francke Foundations), where beginning in 1799, along with August Hermann Niemeyer, he served as co-director. He died in Halle.

Knapp was a proponent of the Pietist Christian thought, and a representative of rational Biblical Supranaturalism. He was the author of a book on the Psalms (published over 11 editions from 1778 to 1789), and of "Vorlesungen über die christliche Glaubenslehre", a work that was later translated into English (with some additions) as "Lectures on Christian Theology" by Leonard Woods, Jr. He also published biographical sketches of Pietist theologians August Hermann Francke, Philipp Jakob Spener and Johann Anastasius Freylinghausen.

Knapp was father-in-law to theologian Johann Karl Thilo (1794–1853).

== Selected works ==
- Die Psalmen (11 editions) 1778–1789.
- "Novum Testamentum graece. Recognovit atque insignioris lectionum varietatis et argumentorum notationes" 1797.
- "Scripta varii argumenti maximam partem exegetici atque historici", 1805.
- Dr. Georg Christian Knapp's Vorlesungen über die christliche Glaubenslehre nach dem Lehrbegriff der evangelischen Kirche, Halle : Buchhandlung des Waisenhauses, 1827. (with Johann Karl Thilo).
- "Hē Kainē Diathēkē = Novum Testamentum Graece", Halis Saxonum : Orphanotrophei, 1829.
- Lectures on Christian theology : Knapp, Georg Christian (online text) (2nd ed.). N. Tibbals, New York. 1845.
