= Athenogenes of Pedachtoë =

Ancient Armenian Christian martyr

Saint Athenogenes of Pedachtoë
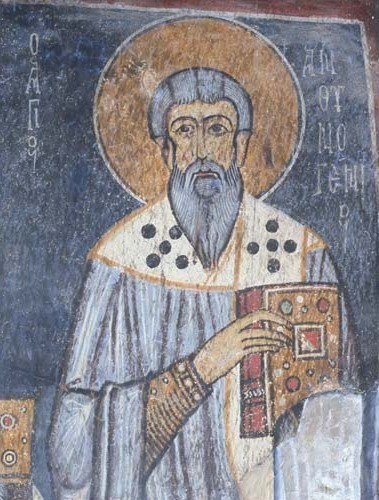
- Born: Epiklesoi, Roman Armenia
- Died: Sebastea
- Feast: June 24 (Byzantine Christianity); July 16 (Eastern Orthodox Church)

Athenogenes (Ancient Greek: Ἀθηνογένης, d. 303 CE) or Saint Athenogenes of Pedachtoë was a priest, chorepiskopos (or "rural bishop"), and Christian martyr of the late 3rd or early 4th century CE, and the leader of a Christian community in the town of Pedachtoë.

== Life ==
Athenogenes was said to have been born to a Christian family in the Black Sea Region of what is now Turkey, in an obscure village called "Epiklesoi", under the city of Sebastopolis (modern Sulusaray) or Sebastea (modern Sivas). He was married and had a son, Patrophilos. He is presented as a miracle-working holy man in his early hagiographies. The cult around this figure formed comparatively early, as he is described by people writing only a few decades after his death, such as Basil of Caesarea.

== Martyrdom ==
The central myth of the cult developed from the 4th to 6th centuries, but takes place in the first or second year of the Diocletianic Persecution. The earliest known story of Athenogenes's martyrdom is that two Christian men, named Ariston (an anagnostes) and Severianos (a psaltes), who were from a small village near Pedachtoë, were arrested in Sebastea by Agricolaus (or Agricola or Agricolanus), the governor of the province of Roman Armenia (and apparently the same person as the prosecutor in the story of the Forty Martyrs of Sebaste), for the crimes of arson and the circulation of Christian literature critical of the Tetrarchy.

After Ariston refused to cooperate and was sentenced to death by burning, Severianos declared under torture that Athenogenes was the author of the libellus they had been circulating, and the instigator of their crimes. Athenogenes was himself then arrested and brought to Sebastea, where both he and Severianos were questioned and ultimately sentenced to death by fire.

Later versions of the tale change some details somewhat, for example by omitting the character of Severianos entirely. According to some traditions, ten of Athenogenes's disciples were also martyred with him.

== Hagiography ==
The stories of his miracles are reminiscent of those of Gregory Thaumaturgus (a Christian figure from the neighboring town of Neocaesarea). He was said to have power over animals both real and mythical (including one dragon), as well as over water. Scholars believe, as with many stories in the hagiography genre, that the author weaved in details from earlier tales of martyrs.

The earliest version of his life that we have is a hagiography of Anysius titled Passion of Athenogenes of Pedachthoe, and preserved in a 10th-century manuscript, Codex Sabaiticus 242, which is currently in the collection of the Patriarchal Library in Jerusalem. Scholars date the composition of the story to around the 6th century CE. This account is considered unusual among hagiographies in that it gives what scholars say is a fairly realistic account of the court proceedings against Ariston, Severianos, and Athenogenes, and it is assumed this is likely constructed from some original transcript passed down rather than a purely literary creation. Scholars date the start of his trial to July 12, 303 CE, with some confidence, and his martydom five days later on July 17, though others believe these happened in 304.

Some later writers have attributed to Athenogenes the creation of the "evening hymn", Phos Hilaron, which it is said Athenogenes sang on the way to his death, though this is considered by modern scholars to be incorrect, and even in ancient times writers such as 4th-century theologian and bishop Basil of Caesarea denied it was written by him.

== Monuments and relics ==
At the time the early hagiography was written, there was apparently a church on the site where Athenogenes had been killed. There was also a shrine to him in Pedachtoë, built atop the octagonal subterranean crypt Athenogenes had constructed to house the remains of some Christian martyrs, and to which, apparently, his own remains had been taken from Sebastea.

4th-century Armenian Christian leader Gregory the Illuminator brought a relic of Athenogenes from Pedachtoë to Vagharshapat, where it was installed in Etchmiadzin Cathedral.
