= Jan N. Bremmer =

Dutch academic and historian

Jan Bremmer
- Born: Jan Nicolaas Bremmer; December 18, 1944 (age 81); Groningen, Netherlands
- Education: Ph.D. (1979)
- Alma mater: VU University Amsterdam
- Occupations: Professor, Author, Editor
- Years active: 1974-2009
- Known for: Research on ancient Greek religion and early Christianity
- Notable work: The Early Greek Concept of the Soul, Interpretations of Greek Mythology

Jan Nicolaas Bremmer (born 18 December 1944) is a Dutch academic and historian. He served as a professor of Religious Studies and Theology at the University of Groningen. He specializes in history of ancient religion, especially ancient Greek religion and early Christianity.

== Early life ==
Jan Nicolaas Bremmer was born during the World War II on 18 December 1944 in Groningen, Netherlands. Though he became a liberal protestant later in life, he was brought up in an orthodox Calvinist family. His father Rolf Hendrik Bremmer was a Calvinist minister and a church historian, and his mother Lucy Lindeboom also came from a family of Calvinist ministers. His maternal great-grandfather Lucas Lindeboom (1845–1933) was a professor at the Kampen Theological College.

Bremmer studied Classics and Spanish at the Vrije Universiteit Amsterdam (1962–1970) and the University of Bristol (1969–1970). During his studies, he began working at a secondary school in Amstelveen, teaching Latin and Ancient Greek. He met his future wife, Christine Bartlett, in Finland in 1968, marrying her a year later. Their first child, Benjamin, was born in 1970. From 1970 to 1972, Bremmer did military service with the Dutch Military Intelligence. After returning home, he and his wife relocated to Ede, Netherlands, and by 1981 they had three further children: Melissa, Rebecca, and Daisy.

== Academic career ==
During 1972–74, Bremmer taught Classics at Christelijk Streeklyceum (Christian Regional Lyceum) in Ede. Subsequently he taught ancient history at the University of Utrecht, as an Assistant Professor (1974–1978) and as an Associate Professor (1978–1990). In 1979, he obtained a Ph.D. from the Vrije Universiteit with a dissertation on The Early Greek Conception of the Soul (published by Princeton University Press in 1983).

In 1990, Bremmer joined the University of Groningen as the Chair of Religious Studies, in Faculty of Theology and Religious Studies. He served as the dean of the Faculty during 1996–2005. He was the inaugural Getty Villa Professor at Malibu during 2006–2007. He served as a visiting professor at several other places, including the University of Edinburgh (2007). He retired from teaching in December 2009. In his farewell lecture in January 2010, he discussed the rise of Christianity through the eyes of scholars Edward Gibbon, Adolf von Harnack and Rodney Stark.

== Works ==
Author

- 1983: The Early Greek Concept of the Soul, Princeton University Press
- 1994: Greek Religion, Oxford University Press
- 2002: The Rise and Fall of the Afterlife, Routledge
- 2008: Greek Religion & Culture, the Bible and the Ancient Near East, Brill
- 2010: The Rise of Christianity through the Eyes of Gibbon, Harnack and Rodney Stark, Barkhuis
- 2014: Initiation into the Mysteries of the Ancient World, De Gruyter

Editor

- 1987: Interpretations of Greek Mythology, Croom Helm
- 1989: From Sappho to De Sade, Routledge
- 1991: A Cultural History of Gesture, Polity (with Herman Roodenburg)
- 1992: Sacred History and Sacred Texts in Early Judaism, Kok Pharos (with F. García Martínez)
- 1995: Between Poverty and the Pyre. Moments in the History of Widowhood Routledge (with Lourens P. van den Bosch)
- 1996: The Apocryphal Acts of Paul and Thecla, Kok Pharos
- 1997: A Cultural History of Humour, Polity (with Herman Roodenburg)
- 1998: The Apocryphal Acts of Peter: Magic, Miracles and Gnosticism, Peeters
- 2000: The Apocryphal Acts of Andrew, Peeters
- 2001: The Apocryphal Acts of Thomas, Peeters
- 2003: The Metamorphosis of Magic from Antiquity to the Middle Ages, Peeters (with J. Veenstra)
- 2006: Cultures of Conversions, Peeters (with W.J. van Bekkum and A.L. Molendijk)
- 2006: Paradigms, Poetics and Politics of Conversion, Peeters (with W.J. van Bekkum and A.L. Molendijk)
- 2007: The Strange World of Human Sacrifice, Peeters
- 2007: The Visio Pauli and the Gnostic Apocalypse of Paul, Peeters (with I. Czachesz)
- 2010: The Gods of Ancient Greece, Edinburgh University Press (with Andrew Erskine)
- 2010: The Pseudo-Clementines, Peeters
- 2012: Perpetua's Passions, Oxford University Press (with Marco Formisano)
- 2015: The Materiality of Magic (Morphomata Vol. 20), Wilhelm Fink (with Dietrich Boschung)

== See also ==
- Sisyphus fragment
