= Acts of Andrew and Matthias =

The Acts of Andrew and Matthias (Latin: Acta Andreae et Matthiae apud Anthropophagos, "The Acts of Andrew and Matthias among the Anthropophagi") is a dramatic story featuring the Apostles Andrew and Matthias. It is an episode in wider apocryphal stories of apostolic acts. Some scholars believed the episode to have originated from the lost original Acts of Andrew, but later scholarship suggests it was an independent tradition that was only later compiled together with the Acts of Andrew in some regions. The original language of the story is uncertain, but was probably Koine Greek.

In the story, the apostles Andrew and Matthias (sometimes referred to as "Matthaeus") have an adventure in a city of human-eating cannibals during a journey. It is written as a thriller with various gory details; the pair witness and experience torture and threatened consumption by the cannibals. With the aid of various prayers and miracles, Matthias escapes, and Andrew eventually converts the city to Christianity.

The narrative is generally understood to have no historical value, and is closer to a heroic romance than anything based on actual Christian missionary work.

== Authorship, date, and manuscripts ==
The work appears to have been popular, and appears in multiple manuscript traditions including Latin, Greek, Syriac, Old Church Slavonic, Coptic, Ethiopic, and Georgian. One manuscript of particular interest was that of Gregory of Tours, who recorded a Latin version of the episode while epitomizing the Acts of Andrew. The version Gregory read almost certainly contained both the main Acts as well as the Acts of Andrew and Matthias, as he presented them as a set.

The author of the work is unknown, and the date it was written is contested. Scholars of the 19th century such as Richard Adelbert Lipsius suggested an early date of the 2nd century CE on the basis that was when the main Acts of Andrew appear to have been written. In favor of this is that the version of the Acts Gregory of Tours read presented the two together. This is largely considered an older view, however, and more recent scholarly analyses such as that of Anthony Hilhorst and Pieter Lalleman suggest that the episode was an independent tradition. In this view, a 4th or 5th century date is suggested; the episode was only later compiled the original Acts of Andrew. In favor of this are various phrasings that fit better with early medieval Byzantine Greek, as well as an assumed sitz im leben that describes abandoned temples replaced by Church buildings – a resonant image after Christianity had become the official Roman religion, but somewhat ahead of the curve for the 2nd century when Christianity was still a tiny minority. Additionally, the story seems to have circulated independently in Syrian Christianity, with many manuscripts including just it and not the Acts of Andrew.

== Contents ==
In the opening, the apostles draw lots to decide which cities they shall go to spread the Christian message. Matthias draws a city filled with cannibals. He is promptly imprisoned as soon as he arrives in preparation for him to be served as food to the citizens. He prays to Jesus for aid. Jesus appears before Andrew (currently in Achaia in some versions) and tells him to go to Matthias's aid. Andrew goes to the shore where he finds a boat ready and waiting for him to be taken to the city of cannibals. In truth, the boat is captained by Jesus himself with two angels, although they appear as mortal men to Andrew. On the boat ride, various stories of Jesus's activities during his life are discussed. The captain (Jesus) asks Andrew why the Jews persist in their unbelief; the two discuss a claimed miracle where Jesus animated a sphinx and made him declare that Jesus was God in front of the chief priests and perform other activities, and that the Patriarchs of the twelve tribes themselves testified to Jesus's godhood after being briefly resurrected, yet the priests continued to oppose Jesus.

Andrew and his disciples fall asleep; when they awaken, they are already at the gate of the city of cannibals, and Jesus and his angelic crew have returned to heaven. His disciples experienced visions of the heavenly realms while dreaming. Andrew stealthily approaches the prison and prays; seven men guarding it instantly die, and the doors miraculously fling open. Andrew tells Matthias to go to a fig tree and eat of its figs. Matthias and his fellow prisoners escape the city and ride a cloud to a nearby mountain where Peter is preaching, where they stay.

Back in the city of cannibals, the administrators of the city are annoyed that their planned meal has escaped, and decide to eat the seven dead guards instead. Andrew's prayers thwart this plan; they decide to gather up seven old people, but Andrew's prayers thwart this as well. Egged on by the devil in the guise of an old man, the citizens search for the unknown force stopping them, but Andrew is invisible to them. However, Jesus tells Andrew to reveal himself openly. Andrew is promptly dragged through the city streets at the end of a rope and then thrown in prison, where he is mocked by the devil and seven demons. He is dragged through the city again on the next day and thrown back into prison yet again, where Andrew prays for relief. He commands an alabaster statue in the prison to spew forth water, causing a catastrophic flood.

The citizens are cowed by the destructive flood, which kills a great number of men, women, children, and cattle. After several more incidents of punishment, Andrew accepts their repentance, and with a prayer, all those who were killed in the flood are resurrected and returned to life. While Andrew wants to return to his disciples and his mission, Jesus insists he stay a time, and spends a week in the city of cannibals instructing them of Christianity before departing.

== Analysis ==
Constantin von Tischendorf published an edited text in 1851 following an 1847 edition of Johann Karl Thilo.

Heinz Hofmann classes it "secondary apocrypha", that is, one derived from apocryphal sources; the ghoulish man-eaters remind Hofmann of the killing of Socrates by the witch Meroë in Apuleius' Metamorphoses, better known as The Golden Ass. Among the Latin texts of the Acta Andreae et Mattiae, F. Blatt notes how the manuscript in Codex Casanatensis 1104 particularly expands upon the horror to describe the instruments and vessels the cannibals use for the slaughter.

Theologian Dennis MacDonald published an analysis of the work in 1990.

== See also ==
- Andreas (poem), an Old English work loosely based on the Acts of Andrew and Matthias
