= Apocalypse of Peter =

2nd-century Christian apocalyptic text

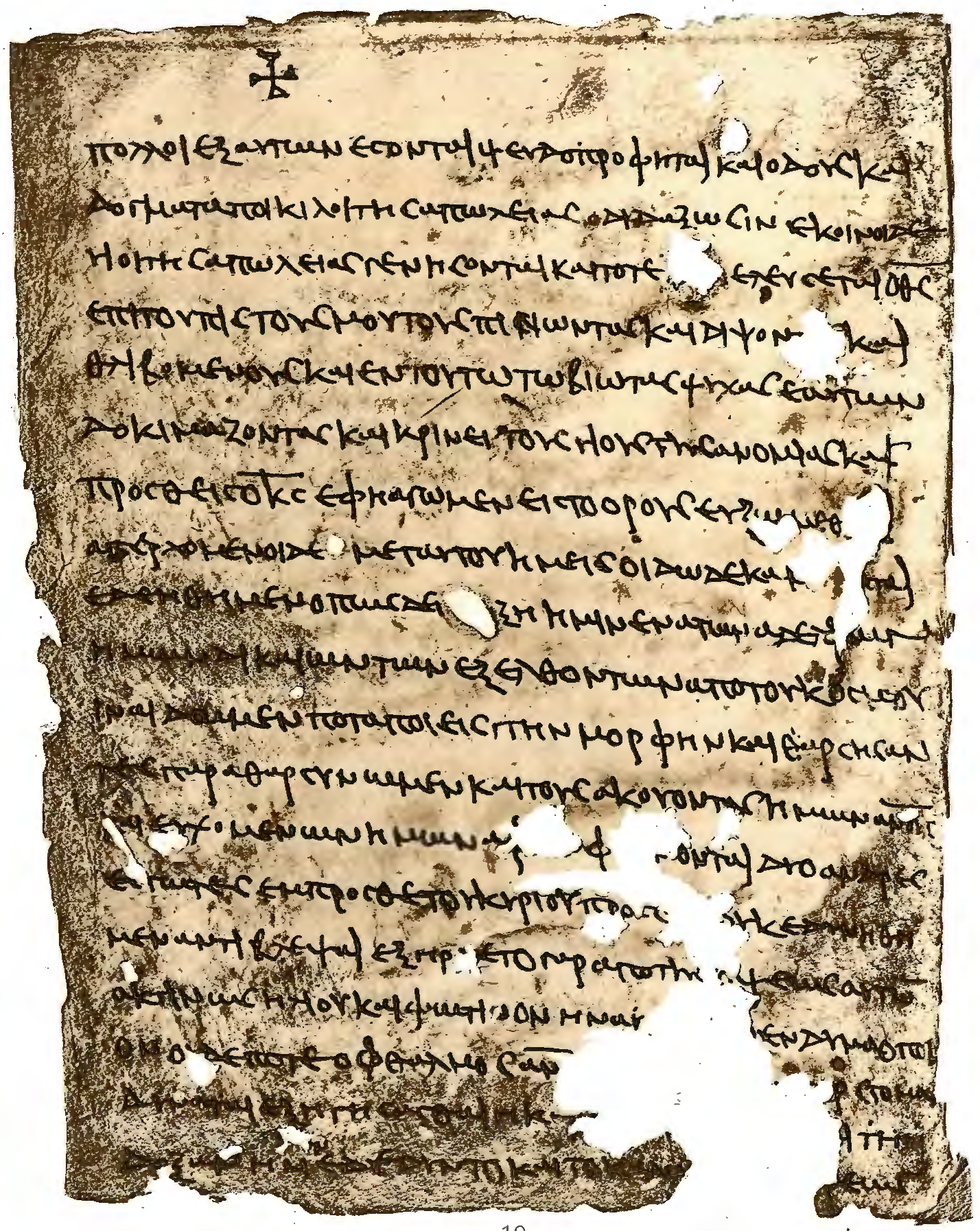
The beginning of the Greek fragment of the Apocalypse of Peter found in Akhmim, Egypt

The Apocalypse of Peter, (Note: Ancient Greek: Ἀποκάλυψις τοῦ Πέτρου, romanized: Apokálypsis toú Pétrou, lit. 'Revelation of Peter'. When there is a risk of confusion with the unrelated Gnostic Apocalypse of Peter or the Arabic Apocalypse of Peter, it is sometimes referred to as the "Greek (Ethiopic) Apocalypse of Peter".) also called the Revelation of Peter, is an early Christian text of the 2nd century and a work of apocalyptic literature. It is the earliest-written extant work depicting a Christian account of heaven and hell in detail. The Apocalypse of Peter is influenced by both Jewish apocalyptic literature and Greek philosophy of the Hellenistic period. The text is extant in two diverging versions based on a lost Koine Greek original: a shorter Greek version and a longer Ethiopic version.

The work is pseudepigraphal: it is purportedly written by the disciple Peter, but its actual author is unknown. The Apocalypse of Peter describes a divine vision experienced by Peter through the risen Jesus Christ. After the disciples inquire about signs of the Second Coming of Jesus, the work delves into a vision of the afterlife (katabasis), and details both heavenly bliss for the righteous and infernal punishments for the damned. In particular, the punishments are graphically described in a physical sense, and loosely correspond to "an eye for an eye" (lex talionis): blasphemers are hung by their tongues; liars who bear false witness have their lips cut off; callous rich people are pierced by stones while being made to go barefoot and wear filthy rags, mirroring the status of the poor in life; and so on.

The Apocalypse of Peter is not included in the standard canon of the New Testament, but is classed as part of New Testament apocrypha. It is listed in the canon of the Muratorian fragment, a 2nd-century list of approved books in Christianity and one of the earliest surviving proto-canons. However, the Muratorian fragment expresses some hesitation on the work, saying that some authorities would not have it read in church. While the Apocalypse of Peter influenced other Christian works in the 2nd, 3rd, and 4th centuries, it came to be considered inauthentic and declined in use. It was largely superseded by the Apocalypse of Paul, a popular 4th-century work heavily influenced by the Apocalypse of Peter that provides its own updated vision of heaven and hell. The Apocalypse of Peter is a forerunner of the same genre as the Divine Comedy of Dante, wherein the protagonist takes a tour of the realms of the afterlife.

== Authorship and date ==
The Eastern Mediterranean region around 125 AD. Scholars hypothesize that the author of the Apocalypse of Peter may have been from Roman Judea or Roman Egypt.

The Apocalypse of Peter seems to have been written between 100 AD and 150 AD. The terminus post quem—the point after which the Apocalypse of Peter must have been written—is shown by its probable use of the Fourth Book of Esdras, which was written about 100 AD. The Apocalypse is quoted in Book 2 of the Sibylline Oracles (c. 150), and cited by name and quoted in Clement of Alexandria's Prophetical Extracts (c. 200). It also appears by name in the Muratorian fragment, generally dated to the late 2nd century (c. 170–200). All of this implies it must have been in existence by around 150 AD, the terminus ante quem (the date before which it must have been written).

The geographic origin of the author is unknown and remains a matter of scholarly debate. The main theories are for Palestine or Egypt. Richard Bauckham argues for more precisely dating the composition to the Bar Kokhba revolt (132–136), and identifies the author as a Jewish Christian in Roman Judea, the region affected by the revolt. As an example, the writer seems to write from a position of persecution, condemning those who caused the deaths of martyrs by their lies, and Bar Kokhba is reputed to have punished and killed Christians. This suggestion is not accepted by all; Eibert Tigchelaar wrote a rebuttal of the argument as unconvincing, as other calamities such as the Jewish revolt under Trajan (115–117) could have been the inspiration, as could forgotten local persecutions. (Note: Richard Bauckham's argument for composition by a Jewish-Christian author in Palestine during the Bar Kokhba revolt also notes the text speaks of a single false messiah who has not yet been exposed as false. The reference to the false messiah as a "liar" may be a Hebrew pun turning Bar Kokhba's original name, Bar Kosiba, into Bar Koziba, "son of the lie". Scholars who have found Bauckham's argument convincing include Oskar Skarsaune and Dennis Buchholz. Scholars who agree with Eibert Tigchelaar against Bauckham include Eric Beck and Tobias Nicklas.) Other scholars suggest Roman Egypt as a possible origin; Jan Bremmer suggests that Greek philosophical influence in the work points to an author or editor in more Hellenized Egypt, although perhaps working off a Palestinian text. (Note: Other advocates of an Egyptian origin include Klaus Berger and C.D.G. Müller, who detect similar veneration of Peter in other Egyptian Christian works as well as references to Egyptian cultural practices. Clement of Alexandria's notice of the work suggests it was popular in Alexandria, the literary center of Egypt.)

== Manuscript history ==
From the medieval era to 1886, the Apocalypse of Peter was known only through quotations and mentions in early Christian writings. A fragmented Koine Greek manuscript was discovered during excavations initiated by Gaston Maspéro during the 1886–87 season in a desert necropolis at Akhmim in Upper Egypt. The fragment consisted of parchment leaves supposedly deposited in the grave of a Christian monk. (Note: The story of the Akhmim codex being found held in the hands of a dead monk is considered possible, yet unconfirmed by later scholars; archaeological practice in 1886 was far less rigorous than the contemporary era. Maspéro did not closely monitor his hired Egyptian staff and was unclear on where precisely the codex came from other than a necropolis in the region, of which there were several. Uriel Bouriant, who produced the initial journal article on the discovery, wrote that it must have been from the grave of a monk. Tobias Nicklas and Thomas Kraus wrote in 2004 that they are skeptical this third-hand account of Bouriant is particularly trustworthy.) There is a wide range of estimates for when the manuscript was written. Paleographer Guglielmo Cavallo and papyrologist Herwig Maehler estimate that the late 6th century is the most likely. The Greek manuscript is now kept in the Coptic Museum in Old Cairo.

The French explorer Antoine d'Abbadie acquired a large number of manuscripts in Ethiopia in the 19th century, but many sat unanalyzed and untranslated for decades. A large set of Clementine literature in Ethiopic from d'Abbadie's collection was published along with translations into French in 1907–1910. After reading the French translations, the English scholar M. R. James realized in 1910 that there was a strong correspondence with the Akhmim Greek Apocalypse of Peter, and that an Ethiopic version of the same work was within this cache. Another independent Ethiopic manuscript was discovered on the island of Kebrān in Lake Tana in 1968. Scholars speculate that these Ethiopic versions were translated from a lost Arabic version, which itself was translated from the lost Greek original. The d'Abbadie manuscript is estimated by Carlo Conti Rossini to have been created in the 15th or 16th century, while the Lake Tana manuscript is estimated by Ernst Hammerschmidt to be from perhaps the 18th century.

Two other short Greek fragments of the work have been discovered, both originally found in Egypt: a 5th-century fragment held by the Bodleian Library in Oxford that had been discovered in 1895; and the Rainer fragment held by the Rainer collection in Vienna, discovered in the 1880s but only recognized as relevant to the Apocalypse of Peter in 1929. The Rainer fragment was dated to the 3rd or 4th century by M. R. James in 1931. A 2003 analysis suggests it is from the same manuscript as the Bodleian fragment and thus also from the 5th century. These fragments offer significant variations from the other versions. In the Ethiopic manuscripts, the Apocalypse of Peter is only one section of a combined work called "The Second Coming of Christ and the Resurrection of the Dead", followed in both manuscripts by a work called "The Mystery of the Judgment of Sinners". In total, five manuscripts are extant today: the two Ethiopic manuscripts and the three Greek fragments.

Most scholars believe that the Ethiopic versions are closer to the original text, while the Greek manuscript discovered at Akhmim is a later and edited version. This is for a number of reasons: the Akhmim version is shorter, while the Ethiopic matches the claimed line count from the Stichometry of Nicephorus; patristic references and quotes seem to match the Ethiopic version better; the Ethiopic matches better with the Rainer and Bodleian Greek fragments; and the Akhmim version seems to be attempting to integrate the Apocalypse with the Gospel of Peter (also in the Akhmim manuscript), which would naturally result in revisions. The Rainer and Bodleian fragments can be compared to the others in only a few passages, but are considered to be the most reliable guide to the original text.

== Contents ==
The Apocalypse of Peter is framed as a discourse of Jesus to his faithful. In the Ethiopic version, the apostle Peter experiences a vision of hell followed by a vision of heaven, granted by the risen Christ; in the Akhmim fragment, the order of heaven and hell is reversed, and it is revealed by Jesus during his life and ministry. In the form of a Greek katabasis or nekyia, it goes into elaborate detail about the punishment in hell for each type of crime, as well as briefly sketching the nature of heaven.

=== The Second Coming ===
In the opening, the disciples ask for signs of the Second Coming (parousia) while on the Mount of Olives. In chapter 2 of the Ethiopic version, Peter asks for an explanation of the meaning of the parables of the budding fig tree and the barren fig tree, in an expansion of the "Little Apocalypse" of Matthew 24. Jesus joins the two parables in a detailed allegory. The setting "in the summer" is transferred to "the end of the world"; the fig tree represents Israel, and the flourishing shoots are Jews who have adopted Jesus as Messiah and achieve martyrdom. The work continues on to describe the end times that will accompany the Second Coming: fire and darkness will convulse the world, a crowned Christ will return in glory, and the people of the nations will pass through a river of fire. The elect will be unscathed by the test, but sinners will be brought to a place where they shall be punished for their transgressions.

=== Punishments and rewards ===
The work proceeds to describe the punishments that await the wicked. Many of the punishments are overseen by Ezrael the Angel of Wrath (most likely the angel Azrael, although possibly a corrupt reference to the angel Sariel). The angel Uriel resurrects the dead into new bodies so that they can be either rewarded or tormented physically. Punishments in hell according to the vision include:

- Blasphemers are hanged by the tongue.
- Those who deny justice are set in a pit of fire.
- Women who adorn themselves for the purpose of adultery are hung by their hair over a bubbling mire. The men who had adulterous relationships with them are hung by their genitals next to them.
- Murderers and their accomplices are tormented by venomous creatures and numberless worms.
- Women who aborted their children are in a pit of excrement up to their throats, and their children shoot a "flash of fire" into their eyes.
- Parents who committed infanticide have the mothers' breast milk congeal into flesh-devouring animals that torment both parents. Their dead children are delivered to a caretaking angel.
- Persecutors and betrayers of the righteous have half their body set on fire, are cast into a dark pit, and their entrails are eaten by a worm that never sleeps.
- Those who slander and doubt God's righteousness gnaw their tongues, are tormented with hot iron, and have their eyes burnt.
- Liars whose lies caused the death of martyrs have their lips cut off, with fire in their body and entrails.
- Rich people who neglected the poor are clothed in filthy rags and pierced by sharp burning stones.
- Those who lend money and charge interest stand up to their knees in a lake of foul matter and blood.
- Men who take on the role of women in a sexual way, and lesbians, fall from the precipice of a great cliff repeatedly.
- Makers of idols either scourge themselves with fire whips (Ethiopic) or they beat each other with fire rods (Akhmim).
- Those who forsook God's commandments and heeded demons burn in flames.
- Those who do not honor their parents fall into a stream of fire repeatedly.
- Those who do not heed the counsel of their elders are attacked by flesh-devouring birds.
- Women who had premarital sex have their flesh torn to pieces.
- Disobedient slaves gnaw their tongues unceasingly.
- Those who give alms hypocritically are rendered blind and deaf, and fall upon coals of fire.
- Sorcerers are hung on a wheel of fire.

The vision of heaven is shorter than the depiction of hell, and described more fully in the Akhmim version. In heaven, people have pure milky white skin, curly hair, and are generally beautiful. The earth blooms with everlasting flowers and spices. People wear shiny clothes made of light, like the angels. Everyone sings in choral prayer.

In the Ethiopic version, the account closes with an account of the ascension of Jesus on the mountain in chapters 15–17. Jesus, accompanied by the prophets Moses and Elijah, ascends on a cloud to the first heaven, and then they depart to the second heaven. While it is an account of the ascension, it includes some parallels to Matthew's account of the transfiguration of Jesus. In the Akhmim fragment, which is set when Jesus was still alive, both the mountain and the two other men are unnamed (rather than being Moses and Elijah), but the men are similarly transfigured into radiant forms.

=== Prayers for those in hell ===
One theological issue appears only in the version of the text in the Rainer fragment. Its chapter 14 describes the salvation of condemned sinners for whom the righteous pray:

Then I will grant to my called and elect ones whomsoever they request from me, out of the punishment. And I will give them [i.e. those for whom the elect pray] a fine baptism in salvation from the Acherousian lake which is, they say, in the Elysian field, a portion of righteousness with my holy ones.

While not found in later manuscripts, this reading was likely original to the text, as it agrees with a quotation in the Sibylline Oracles:

To these pious ones imperishable God, the universal ruler, will also give another thing. Whenever they ask the imperishable God to save men from the raging fire and deathless gnashing he will grant it, and he will do this. For he will pick them out again from the undying fire and set them elsewhere and send them on account of his own people to another eternal life with the immortals in the Elysian plain where he has the long waves of the deep perennial Acherusian lake.

— Sibylline Oracles, Book 2, 330–338

Other pieces of Christian literature with parallel passages probably influenced by this include the Epistle of the Apostles and the Coptic Apocalypse of Elijah. (Note: The Acts of Paul and Thecla is another work possibly influenced by the Rainer passage, although this connection is more contested. M. R. James detected a parallel in a passage where Thecla prays for the dead Falconilla to be delivered to heaven, but Dennis Buchholz writes that this only shows the author was familiar with similar material in the Christian tradition.) The passage also makes literary sense, as it is a follow-up to a passage in chapter 3 where Jesus initially rebukes Peter who expresses horror at the suffering in hell; Richard Bauckham suggests that this is because it must be the victims who were harmed that request mercy, not Peter. While not directly endorsing universal salvation, it does suggest that salvation will eventually reach as far as the compassion of the elect.

The Ethiopic manuscript maintains a version of the passage, but it differs in that it is the elect and righteous who receive baptism and salvation in a field rather than a lake ("field of Akerosya, which is called Aneslasleya" in Ethiopic), perhaps conflating Acherusia with the Elysian field. The Ethiopic version of the list of punishments in hell includes sentences not in the Akhmim fragment saying that the punishment is eternal—hypothesized by many scholars to be later additions. Despite this, the other Clementine works in the Ethiopic manuscripts discuss a great act of divine mercy to come that must be kept secret, yet will rescue some or all sinners from hell, suggesting this belief had not entirely fallen away.

== Influences, genre, and related works ==
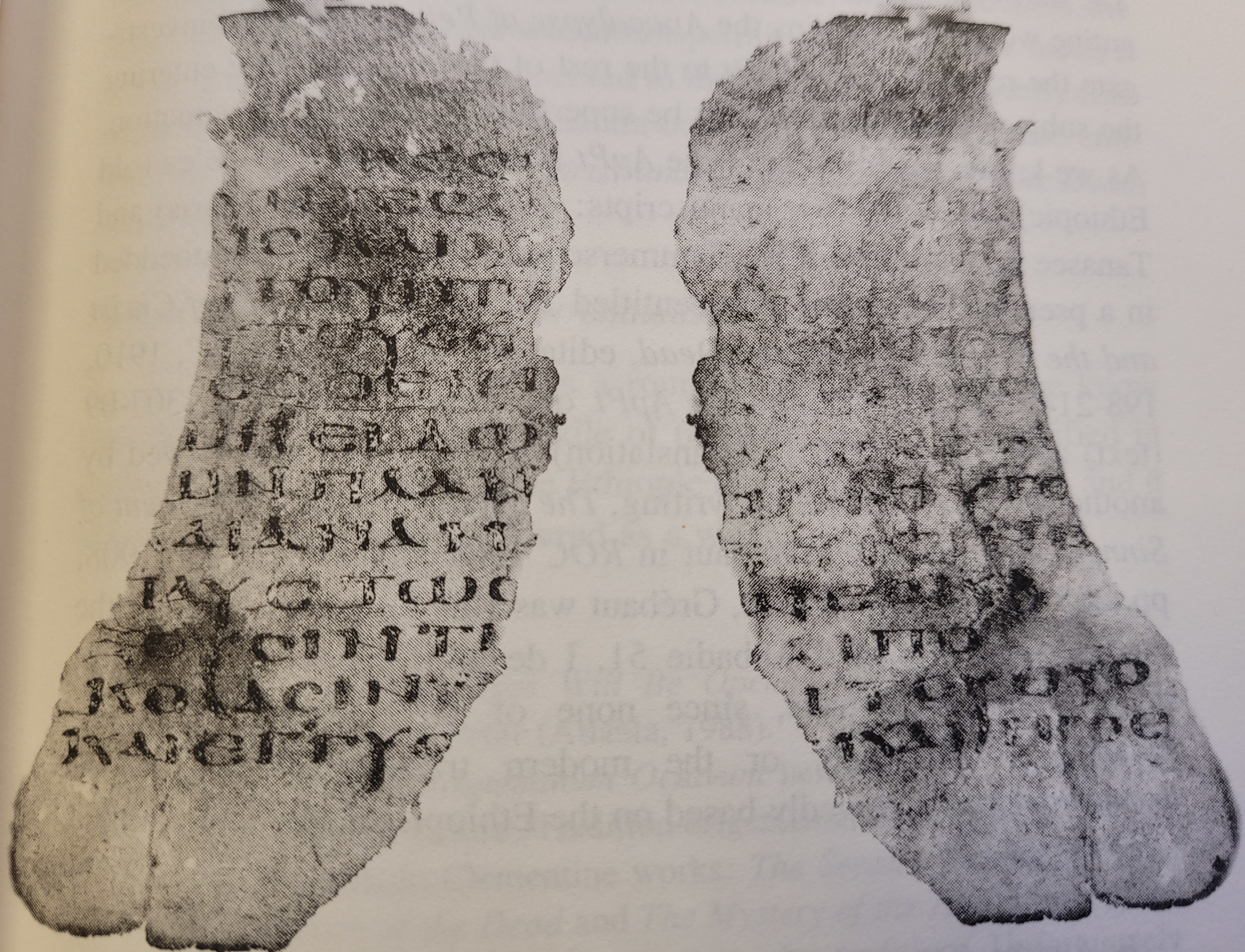
The fragment of the Apocalypse of Peter held by the Bodleian Library

As the title suggests, the Apocalypse of Peter is classed as part of the genre of apocalyptic literature. The Greek word apokalypsis literally means "revelation", and apocalypses typically feature a revelation of otherworldly secrets from a divine being to a human—in the case of this work, Jesus and Peter. Like many other apocalypses, the work is pseudepigraphal: it claims the authorship of a famous figure to bolster the authority of its message. The Apocalypse of Peter is one of the earliest examples of a Christian katabasis, a genre of explicit depictions of the realms and fates of the dead.

=== Predecessors ===
Much of the early scholarship on the Apocalypse was spent on efforts to determine its predecessor influences. The first studies generally emphasized its roots in Hellenistic philosophy and thought. Nekyia, a work by Albrecht Dieterich published in 1893 on the basis of the Akhmim manuscript alone, identified parallels and links with the Orphic religious tradition and Greek cultural context. Plato's Phaedo is often held up as an example of the Greek beliefs on the nature of the afterlife that influenced the Apocalypse of Peter. Scholarship in the late 20th century by Martha Himmelfarb and others emphasizes the strong Jewish roots of the Apocalypse of Peter as well. Apocalypses were a popular genre among Jews in the era of Greek and then Roman rule. Much of the Apocalypse of Peter may be based on or influenced by these lost Jewish apocalypses, works such as the "Book of the Watchers" (chapters 1–36 of the Book of Enoch), and 1st–2nd-century Jewish thought in general. The work probably cites the Jewish apocalyptic work 4 Esdras. The author also appears to be familiar with the Gospel of Matthew but no other gospels; a line in chapter 16 has Peter realizing the meaning of the Beatitude quote that "Blessed are those who are persecuted for righteousness's sake, for theirs is the kingdom of Heaven."

The Apocalypse of Peter seems to quote from Ezekiel 37, the story of the Valley of Dry Bones. During its rendition of the ascension of Jesus, it also quotes from Psalm 24, which was considered as a messianic psalm foretelling the coming of Jesus and Christianity in the early church. The psalm is given an interpretation as a prophecy of Jesus's entry into heaven.

The post-mortem baptism in the Acherousian lake was likely influenced by the Jewish cultural practice of washing the dead before the corpse is buried, a practice shared by early Christians. There was a linkage or analogy between cleansing the soul on death as well as cleaning the body, as the Apocalypse of Peter passage essentially combines the two.

While much work has been done on predecessor influences, Eric Beck stresses that much of the Apocalypse of Peter is distinct among extant literature of the period, and may well have been unique at the time, rather than simply adapting lost earlier writings. As an example, earlier Jewish literature varied in its depictions of Sheol, the underworld, but did not usually threaten active torment to the wicked. Instead eternal destruction was the more frequent threat in these early works, a possibility that does not arise in the Apocalypse of Peter.

=== Contemporary work ===
In the beginning of the book, Jesus, who had been resurrected, is giving further insights to the Apostles. This is followed by an account of Jesus's ascension. This appears to have been a popular setting in 2nd century Christian works, with the dialogue generally taking place on a mountain, as in the Apocalypse of Peter. The genre is sometimes called a "dialogue Gospel", and is seen in works such as the Epistle of the Apostles, the Questions of Bartholomew, and various Gnostic works such as the Pistis Sophia.

Among writings that were eventually canonized in the New Testament, the Apocalypse of Peter shows a close resemblance in ideas with the epistle 2 Peter, to the extent that many scholars believe one had copied passages from the other due to the number of close parallels. While both are apocalypses in genre, the Apocalypse of Peter puts far more stress on the afterlife and divine rewards and punishments, while the Book of Revelation (the Apocalypse of John) focuses on a cosmic battle between good and evil.

=== Later influence ===
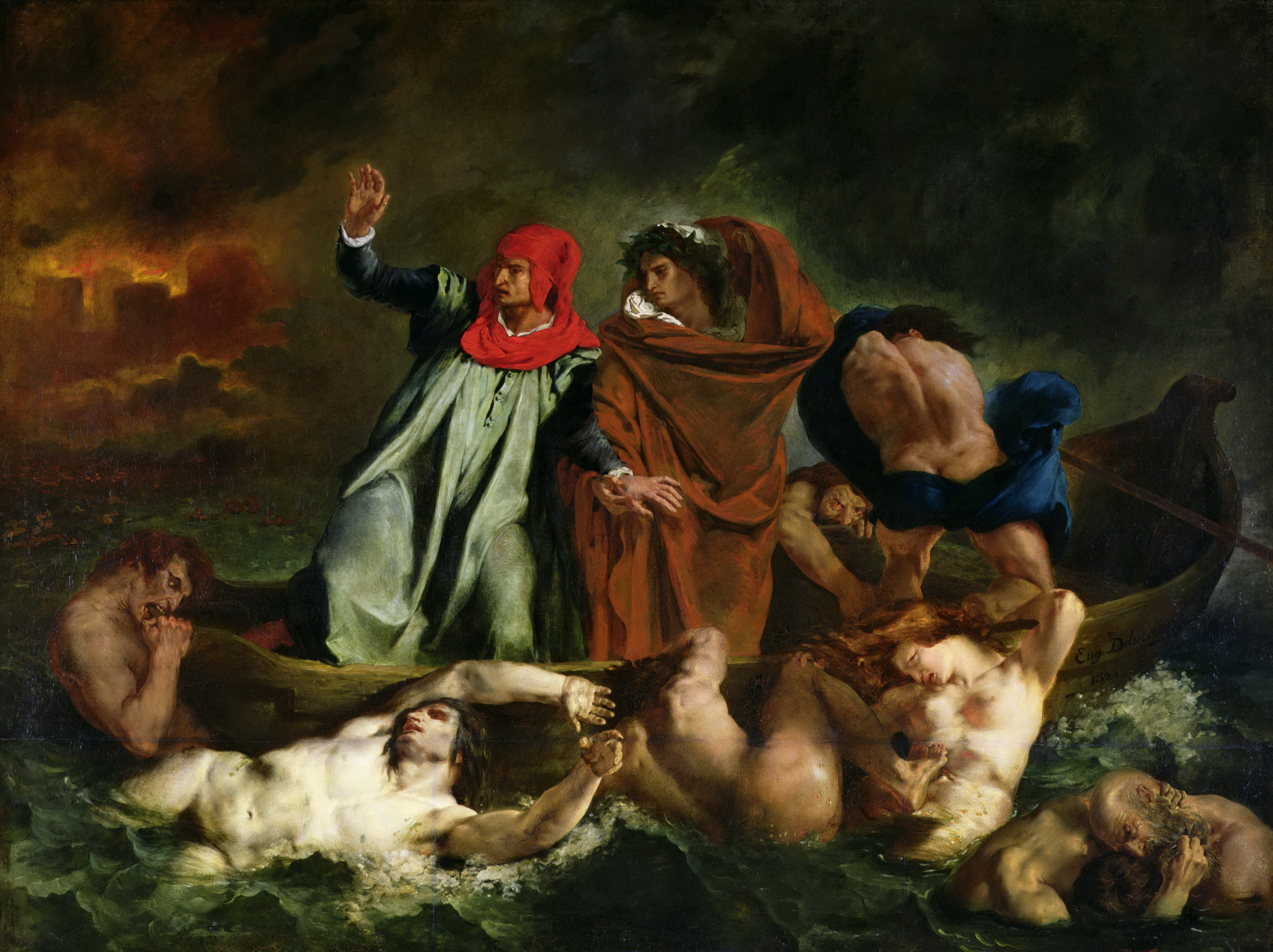
Dante and Virgil in Hell, an 1822 painting by Eugène Delacroix. Dante very likely read the Apocalypse of Paul and references it in The Divine Comedy; the Apocalypse of Paul was heavily influenced by the Apocalypse of Peter.

The Apocalypse of Peter is the earliest surviving detailed depiction of heaven and hell in a Christian context. These depictions appear to have been quite influential to later works, although how much of this is due to the Apocalypse of Peter itself and how much to lost similar literature is unclear.

The Sibylline Oracles, popular among Roman Christians, directly quotes the Apocalypse of Peter. Macarius Magnes's Apocriticus, a 3rd-century Christian apologetic work, features "a pagan philosopher" who quotes the Apocalypse of Peter, albeit in an attempt to disprove Christianity. The visions narrated in the Acts of Thomas, another 3rd-century work, also appear to quote or reference the Apocalypse of Peter. The bishop Methodius of Olympus appears to positively quote the Apocalypse of Peter in the 4th century, although it is uncertain whether he regarded it as scripture. (Note: A contested example of influence is in Theophilus of Antioch's Apology to Autolycus. Gilles Quispel and R. M. Grant argued that a line in it might be loosely quoting the Akhmim version of the Apocalypse of Peter: a description of an Eden-like place of light and exquisite plants. Dennis Buchholz does not find this argument convincing; while it is possible Theophilus was familiar with the Apocalypse of Peter, descriptions of paradise involving both light and flowering plants were common in the era, and seen in common sources such as the Book of Enoch.)

The Apocalypse of Peter is a predecessor of and has similarities with the genre of Clementine literature that would later be popular in Alexandria, although Clement himself does not appear in the Apocalypse of Peter. Clementine stories usually involved Peter and Clement of Rome having adventures, revelations, and dialogues together. Both Ethiopic manuscripts that include the Apocalypse of Peter are mixed in with other Ethiopic Clementine literature that feature Peter prominently. Clementine literature became popular in the third and fourth century, but it is not known when the Clementine sections of the Ethiopic manuscripts containing the Apocalypse of Peter were originally written. Daniel Maier proposes an Egyptian origin in the 6th–10th centuries, while Richard Bauckham suggests the author was familiar with the Arabic Apocalypse of Peter and proposes an origin in the 8th century or later.

Later apocalyptic works inspired by the Apocalypse of Peter include the Apocalypse of Thomas in the 2nd–4th century, and more influentially, the Apocalypse of Paul in the 4th century. One change that the Apocalypse of Paul makes is describing personal judgments that happen immediately after death and decide whether a soul receives bliss or torment, rather than the Apocalypse of Peter being a vision of a future destiny that will take place after the Second Coming of Jesus. Hell and paradise are both on a future Earth in Peter, but are another realm of existence in Paul. The Apocalypse of Paul is also more interested in condemning sins committed by insufficiently devout Christians, while the Apocalypse of Peter seems to view the righteous as a unified group. The Apocalypse of Paul never saw official Church approval. Despite this, it would go on to be popular and influential for centuries, possibly due to the high esteem in which it was held among medieval monks. Dante Alighieri's Divine Comedy would become extremely popular and celebrated in the 14th century and beyond, and was influenced by the Apocalypse of Paul. The Apocalypse of Peter thus was the forerunner of these influential visions of the afterlife: Emiliano Fiori wrote that it contains the "embryonic forms" of the heaven and hell of the Apocalypse of Paul, and Jan Bremmer wrote that the Apocalypse of Paul was "the most important step in the direction that would find its apogee in Dante".

== Analysis ==
=== The punishments and lex talionis ===
But the wicked and sinners and hypocrites will stand in the midst of a pit of darkness that cannot be extinguished and their punishment will be fire. And the angels will bring their sin and they will prepare for them a place where they will be punished forever, each one according to their transgression.

— Apocalypse of Peter (Ethiopic) 6:5-6

The list of punishments for the damned is likely the most influential and famous part of the work, with almost two-thirds of the text dedicated to the calamitous end times that will accompany the return of Jesus (Chapters 4–6) and the punishments afterward (Chapters 7–13). The punishments in the vision generally correspond to the past sinful actions, usually with a correspondence between the body part that sinned and the body part that is tortured. It is a loose version of the Jewish notion of an eye for an eye, also known as lex talionis, that the punishment should fit the crime. The phrase "each according to his deed" appears five times in the Ethiopic version to explain the punishments. Dennis Buchholz writes that the verse "Everyone according to his deeds" is the theme of the entire work. In a dialogue with the angel Tatirokos, the keeper of Tartarus, the damned themselves admit that their fate is based on their own deeds, and is fair and just. The role reversal seen in the punishment of the wealthy who neglected poor widows and orphans is perhaps the most direct example, with them wearing filthy rags: they suffer exactly as they let others suffer. Still, the connection between the crime and the punishment is not always obvious. David Fiensy writes that "It is possible that where there is no logical correspondence, the punishment has come from the Orphic tradition and has simply been clumsily attached to a vice by a Jewish redactor."

Bart Ehrman contests classifying the ethics of the Apocalypse as being those of lex talionis, and considers bodily correspondence the overriding concern instead. For Ehrman, the punishments described are far more severe than the original crime – which goes against the idea of punishments being commensurate to the damage inflicted within "an eye for an eye".

Callie Callon suggests a philosophy of "mirror punishment" as motivating the punishments where the harm done is reflected in a sort of poetic justice, and is determined more by symbolism than by the lex talionis. She argues that this best explains the logic behind placing sorcerers in a wheel of fire, considered unclear by scholars such as Fiensy. Other scholars have suggested that it is perhaps a weak reference to the punishment of Ixion in Greek mythology; Callon suggests that it is, instead, a reference to a rhombus, a spinning top that was also used by magicians. The magicians had spun a rhombus for power in their lives, and now were tormented by similar spinning, with the usual addition of fire seen in other punishments.

The text is somewhat corrupt and unclear in Chapter 11, known only from the Ethiopic version, which describes the punishment for those who dishonor their parents. The nature of the first punishment is hard to discern and involves going up to a high fiery place, perhaps a volcano. It is believed by most translators that the target was closer to "adults who abandon their elderly parents" rather than condemning disobedient children, but it is difficult to be certain. However, the next punishments do target children, saying that those who fail to heed tradition and their elders will be devoured by birds, while girls who do not maintain their virginity before marriage (implicitly also a violation of parental expectations) will have their flesh torn apart. This is possibly an instance of mirror punishment or bodily correspondence, where the skin which sinned is itself punished. The text also specifies ten girls are punished – possibly a loose reference to the Parable of the Ten Virgins in the Gospel of Matthew, although not a very accurate one if so, as only five virgins are reprimanded in the parable, and for unrelated reasons.

The Apocalypse of Peter is one of the earliest pieces of Christian literature to feature an anti-abortion message; mothers who abort their children are among those tormented.

=== Christology ===
The Akhmim Greek text generally refers to Jesus as kyrios, "Lord". The Ethiopic manuscripts are similar, but the style notably shifts in Chapters 15 and 16 in the last section of the work, which refer to Jesus by name and introduce him with exalted titles including "Jesus Christ our King" (negus) and "my God Jesus Christ". This is considered a sign this section was edited later by a scribe with a high Christology.

=== Angels and demons ===
It is unknown how much of the angelology and demonology in the Ethiopic version was in the older Greek versions. The Akhmim version does not mention demons when describing the punishment of those who forsook God's commandments; even in Ethiopic, it is possible that the demons are servants of God performing the punishment, rather than those who led the damned into sin. As the Ethiopic version was likely a translation of an Arabic translation, it may have picked up some influence from Islam centuries later; the references to Ezrael the Angel of Wrath were possibly influenced by Azrael the Angel of Death, who is usually more associated with Islamic angelology. The Ethiopic version does make it clear that punishments are envisioned not just for human sin, but also supernatural evil: the angel Uriel gives physical bodies to the evil spirits that inhabited idols and led people astray so that they, too, can be burned in the fire and punished. Sinners who perished in the Great Flood are brought back as well: probably a reference to the Nephilim, the children of the Watchers (fallen angels) and mortal women described in the Book of Enoch and the Book of Jubilees.

The children who died by infanticide are delivered to the angel "Temelouchus", which probably was a rare Greek word meaning "care-taking [one]". Later writers seem to have interpreted it as a proper name, however, resulting in a specific angel of hell appearing named "Temlakos" (Ethiopic) or "Temeluchus" (Greek), found in the Apocalypse of Paul and various other sources.

=== Literary merits ===
Scholars of the 19th and 20th century considered the work rather intellectually simple and naive; dramatic and gripping, but not necessarily a coherent story. Still, the Apocalypse of Peter was popular and had a wide audience in its time. M. R. James remarked that his impression was that educated Christians of the later Roman period considered the work somewhat embarrassing and "realized it was a gross and vulgar book", which might have partially explained a lack of elite enthusiasm for canonizing it later.

=== Theology ===
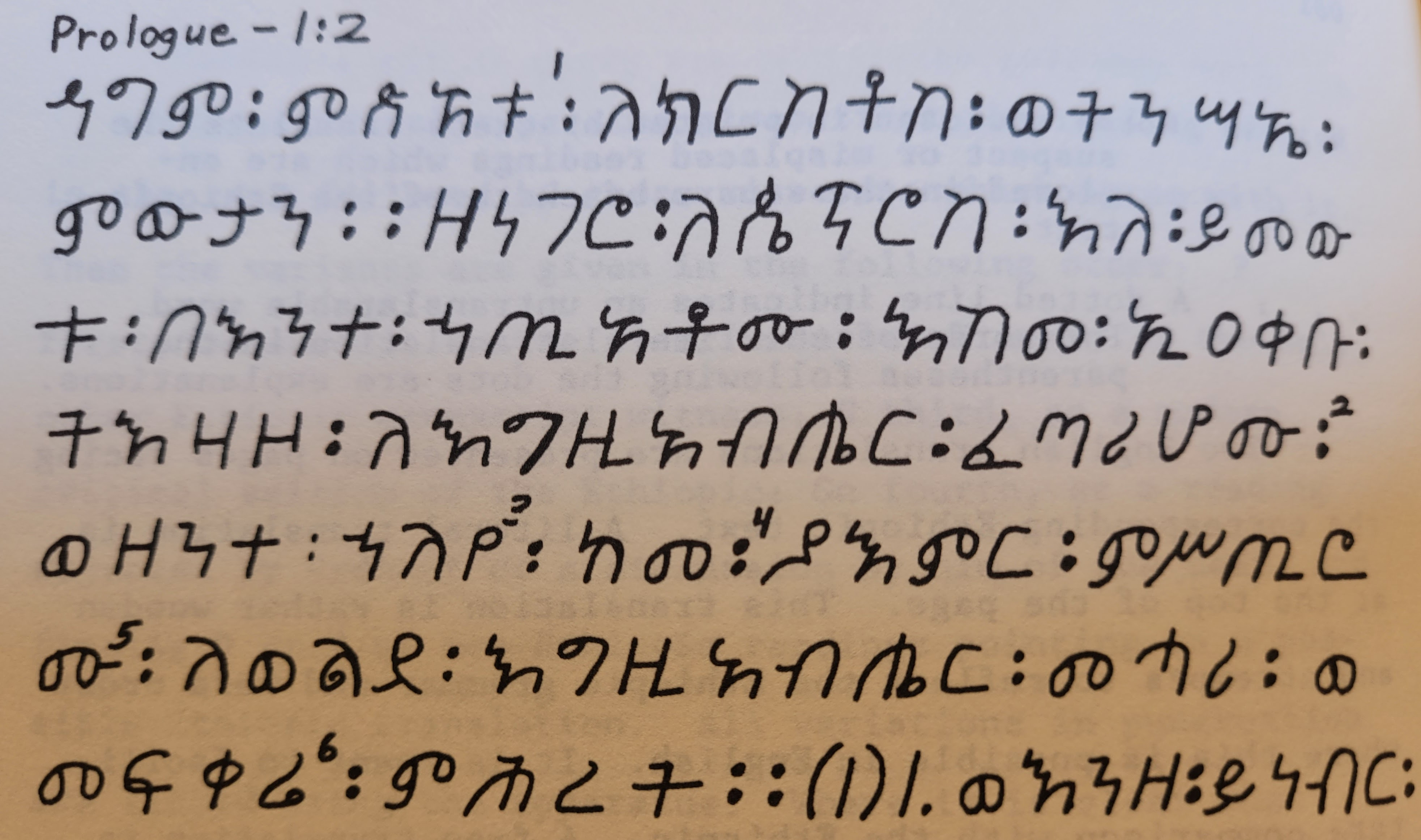
A transcription of the prologue to the Apocalypse of Peter (Ethiopic version)

The Second Coming of Christ and the resurrection of the dead, which he told to Peter, who die for their sin because they did not observe the commandment of God, their creator. And this he [Peter] reflected upon so that he might understand the mystery of the Son of God, the merciful and lover of mercy.

— Prologue to the Apocalypse of Peter (Ethiopic)

One of the theological messages of the Apocalypse of Peter is generally considered clear enough: the torments of hell are meant to encourage keeping a righteous path and to warn readers and listeners away from sin, knowing the horrible fate that awaits those who stray. The work also responds to the problem of theodicy addressed in earlier writings such as Daniel: the question of why a sovereign and just God allows the persecution of the righteous on Earth. The Apocalypse says that everyone will be repaid by their deeds, even the dead, and God will eventually make things right. Scholars have come up with different interpretations of the intended tone of the work. Michael Gilmour sees the work as encouraging schadenfreude and delighting in the suffering of the wicked, while Eric Beck argues the reverse: that the work was intended to ultimately cultivate compassion for those suffering, including the wicked and even persecutors. Most scholars agree that the Apocalypse simultaneously advocates for both divine justice and divine mercy, and contains elements of both messages.

The version of the Apocalypse seen in the Ethiopic version could plausibly have originated from a Christian community that still considered itself as part of Judaism. The adaptation of the fig tree parables to an allegory about the flourishing of Israel and its martyrs pleasing God is only found in Chapter 2 of the Ethiopic version. While it is impossible to know for sure why it is absent in the Greek Akhmim version, one possibility is that it was edited out due to incipient anti-Jewish sentiment in the church. A depiction of Jews converting and Israel being especially blessed may have fit poorly with the strong repudiation of Judaism common in the Church during the 4th and 5th centuries.

In one passage in Chapter 16, Peter offers to build three tabernacles on Earth. Jesus sharply rebukes him, saying that there is only a single heavenly tabernacle. This is possibly a reference to the destruction of the Second Temple in 70 AD and a condemnation of attempting to build a replacement "Third Temple", although perhaps it is only a reference to all of God's elect living together with a unified tabernacle in Paradise.

== Debate over canonicity ==
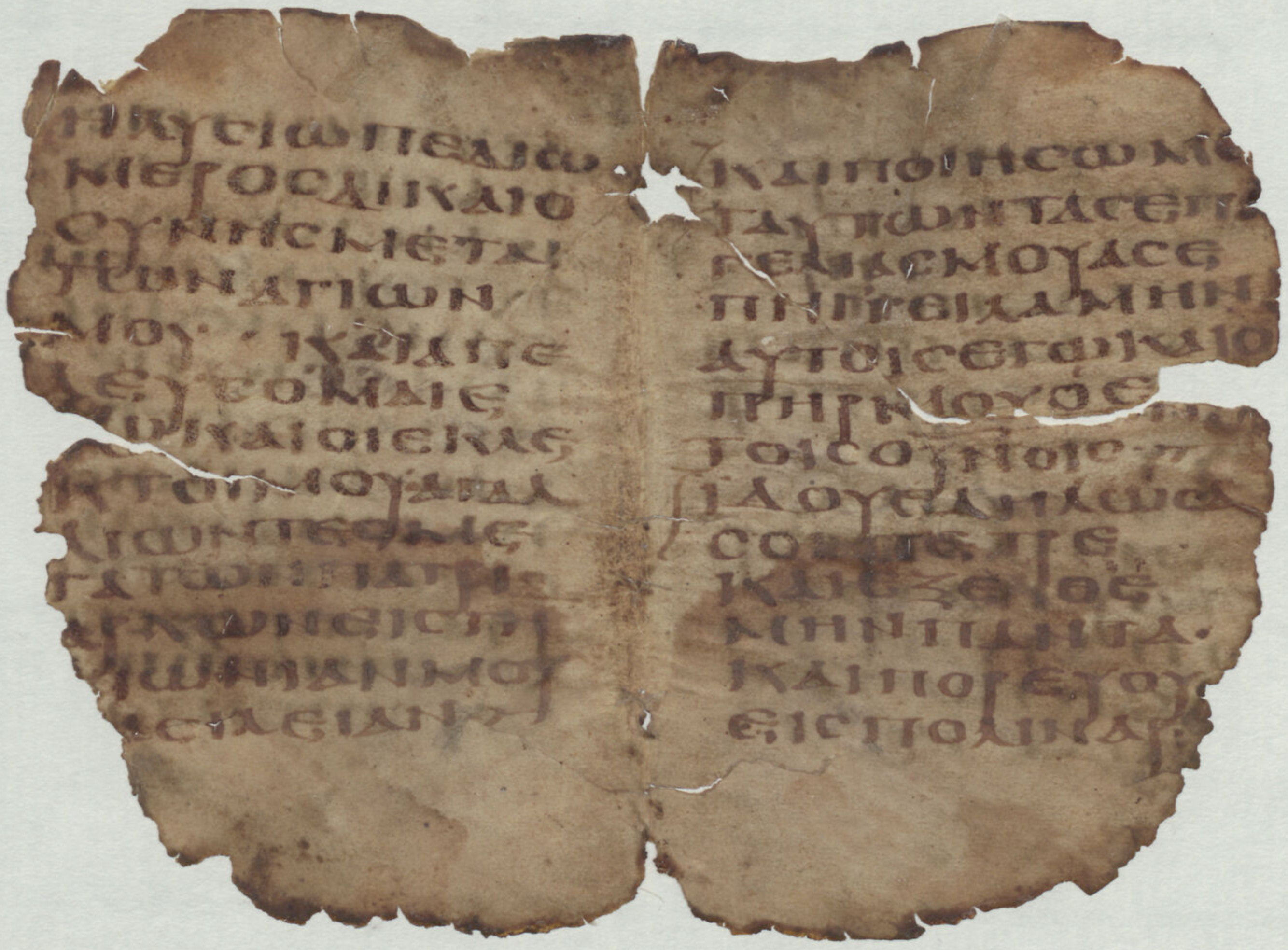

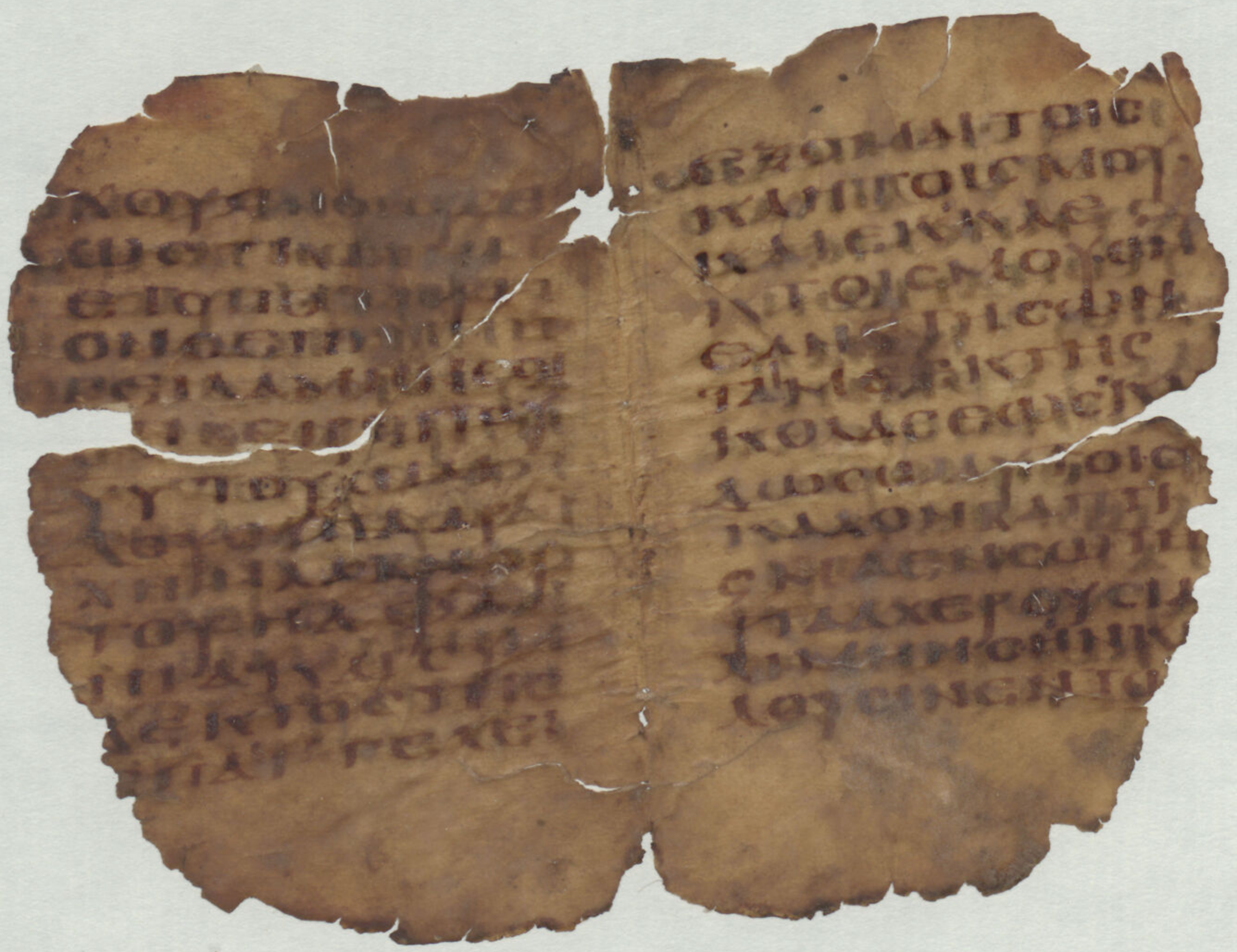
The Rainer fragment, held by the Papyrus Collection of the Austrian National Library, which endorses the possibility of escape from the torments of Hell, a theological controversy in the 4th–5th centuries

The Apocalypse of Peter was ultimately not included in the New Testament, but appears to have been one of the works that came closest to being included, along with The Shepherd of Hermas. The Muratorian fragment is one of the earliest-created extant lists of approved Christian sacred writings, part of the process of creating what would eventually be called the New Testament. The fragment is generally dated to the late 2nd century (c. 170–200 AD). It gives a list of works read in the Christian churches that is similar to the modern accepted canon; however, it does not include some of the general epistles, but does include the Apocalypse of Peter. The Muratorian fragment states: "We receive only the apocalypses of John and Peter, though some of us are not willing that the latter be read in the church." (Other pieces of apocalyptic literature are implicitly acknowledged, yet not "received".) Both the Apocalypse of Peter and the Apocalypse of John (the Book of Revelation) appear to have been controversial, with some churches of the 2nd and 3rd centuries using them and others not. A common criticism of those who opposed the canonicity of these works was to accuse them of lacking apostolic authorship.

Clement of Alexandria appears to have considered the Apocalypse of Peter to be holy scripture (c. 200 AD). Eusebius personally classified the work as inauthentic and spurious, yet not heretical, in his book Church History (c. 320s AD). Eusebius also describes a lost work of Clement's, the Hypotyposes (Outlines), that gave "abbreviated discussions of the whole of the registered divine writings, without passing over the disputed [writings] – I mean Jude and the rest of the general letters, and the Letter of Barnabas, and the so-called Apocalypse of Peter." The Apocalypse of Peter is listed in the catalog of the 6th-century Codex Claromontanus, which was probably copying a 3rd- or 4th-century source. The entry in the catalog is marked with an obelus (along with the Epistle of Barnabas, The Shepherd of Hermas, and the Acts of Paul): probably an indication by the scribe that its status was not authoritative. As late as the 5th century, Sozomen indicates that some churches in Palestine still read it, but by then, it seems to have been considered inauthentic by most Christians. The Byzantine-era Stichometry of Nicephorus lists both the Apocalypses of Peter and John as used if disputed books.

Although these references to it attest that it was in wide circulation in the 2nd and 3rd century, the Apocalypse of Peter was ultimately not accepted into the Christian biblical canon, although the reason why is not entirely clear. One hypothesis for why the Apocalypse of Peter failed to gain enough support to be canonized is that its view on the afterlife was too close to endorsing Christian universalism and the related doctrine of apokatastasis, that God will make all things perfect in the fullness of time. The passage in the Rainer fragment that the saints, seeing the torment of sinners from heaven, could ask God for mercy, and these damned souls could be retroactively baptized and saved, had significant theological implications. Presumably, all of hell could eventually be emptied in such a manner. M. R. James argued that the original Apocalypse of Peter may well have suggested universal salvation after a period of cleansing suffering in hell. This ran against the stance of many Church theologians of the 3rd, 4th, and 5th centuries who strongly felt that salvation and damnation were eternal and strictly based on actions and beliefs while alive. Augustine of Hippo, in his work The City of God, denounces arguments based on very similar logic to what is seen in the Rainer passage. Such a system, where saints could at least pray their friends and family out of hell, and possibly any damned soul, would have been considered incorrect at best, and heretical at worst. Most scholars since agree with James: the reading in the Rainer fragment was that of the original. The contested passage was not copied by later scribes who felt it was in error, hence not appearing in later manuscripts, along with the addition of the sentences indicating the punishment would be eternal. Bart Ehrman suggests that the damage to the book's reputation was already done, however. The Origenist Controversies of the 4th and 5th centuries retroactively condemned much of the thought of the theologian Origen, particularly his belief in universal salvation, and this anti-Origen movement was at least part of why the book was not included in the biblical canons of later centuries. (Note: Origen wrote in the 3rd century, long after the Apocalypse of Peter was created, and his theological rationale for universal salvation was different; nevertheless, later Christians often assumed Origen's influence was the source of this doctrine. A scribal note to a manuscript of the Sibylline Oracles on the matter of prayers for the dead reads: "Plainly false. For the fire which tortures the condemned will never cease. Even I would pray that this be so, though I am marked with very great scars of faults, which have need of very great mercy. But let babbling Origen be ashamed of saying that there is a limit to punishment.")

== Translations ==
Selected modern English translations of the Apocalypse of Peter can be found in:

- Beck, Eric J. (2019). Frey, Jörg (ed.). Justice and Mercy in the Apocalypse of Peter: A New Translation and Analysis of the Purpose of the Text. WUNT 427. Tübingen: Mohr Siebeck. pp. 66–73. ISBN 978-3-16-159030-6. (a composite translation drawing from both the Greek and the Ethiopic; available openly at pages 98–112 of Beck's thesis)
- Beck, Eric J. (2024). "Translation of the Ethiopic Apocalypse of Peter including the Pseudo-Clementine Framework". In Maier, Daniel C.; Frey, Jörg; Kraus, Thomas J. (eds.). The Apocalypse of Peter in Context (PDF). Studies on Early Christian Apocrypha 21. Peeters. pp. 377–400. doi:10.2143/9789042952096. ISBN 978-90-429-5208-9. (a translation of solely the Ethiopic text; available open-access)
- Buchholz, Dennis D. (1988). Your Eyes Will Be Opened: A Study of the Greek (Ethiopic) Apocalypse of Peter. Society of Biblical Literature Dissertation series 97. Atlanta: Scholars Press. pp. 157–244. ISBN 1-55540-025-6.
- Elliott, James Keith (1993). The Apocryphal New Testament. Oxford University Press. pp. 593–615. ISBN 0-19-826182-9.
- Gardiner, Eileen (1989). Visions of Heaven and Hell Before Dante. New York: Italica Press. pp. 1–12. ISBN 9780934977142.
- Kraus, Thomas J.; Nicklas, Tobias (2004). Das Petrusevangelium und die Petrusapokalypse: Die griechischen Fragmente mit deutscher und englischer Übersetzung [The Gospel of Peter and the Apocalypse of Peter: The Greek Fragments with German and English Translation]. GCS N.F. 11 (in German and English). Berlin: De Gruyter. pp. 118–120. ISBN 978-3110176353.

== Bibliography ==
- Bauckham, Richard B. (1998). The Fate of the Dead: Studies on the Jewish and Christian Apocalypses. Supplements to Novum Testamentum 93. Leiden: Brill. ISBN 9781589832886.
- Beck, Eric J. (2019). Frey, Jörg (ed.). Justice and Mercy in the Apocalypse of Peter: A New Translation and Analysis of the Purpose of the Text. WUNT 427. Tübingen: Mohr Siebeck. doi:10.1628/978-3-16-159031-3. ISBN 978-3-16-159030-6.
- Bremmer, Jan N.; Czachesz, István, eds. (2003). The Apocalypse of Peter. Studies on Early Christian Apocrypha 7. Peeters. ISBN 90-429-1375-4.
- Buchholz, Dennis D. (1988). Your Eyes Will Be Opened: A Study of the Greek (Ethiopic) Apocalypse of Peter. Society of Biblical Literature Dissertation series 97. Atlanta: Scholars Press. ISBN 1-55540-025-6.
- Ehrman, Bart (2022). Journeys to Heaven and Hell: Tours of the Afterlife in the Early Christian Tradition. New Haven and London: Yale University Press. ISBN 978-0-300-25700-7.
- Kraus, Thomas J.; Nicklas, Tobias (2004). Das Petrusevangelium und die Petrusapokalypse: Die griechischen Fragmente mit deutscher und englischer Übersetzung [The Gospel of Peter and the Apocalypse of Peter: The Greek Fragments with German and English Translation]. GCS N.F. 11 (in German). Berlin: De Gruyter. ISBN 978-3110176353.
- Maier, Daniel C.; Frey, Jörg; Kraus, Thomas J., eds. (2024). The Apocalypse of Peter in Context (PDF). Studies on Early Christian Apocrypha 21. Peeters. doi:10.2143/9789042952096. ISBN 978-90-429-5208-9.
