= Apocalypse of Zephaniah =

1st-century religious text

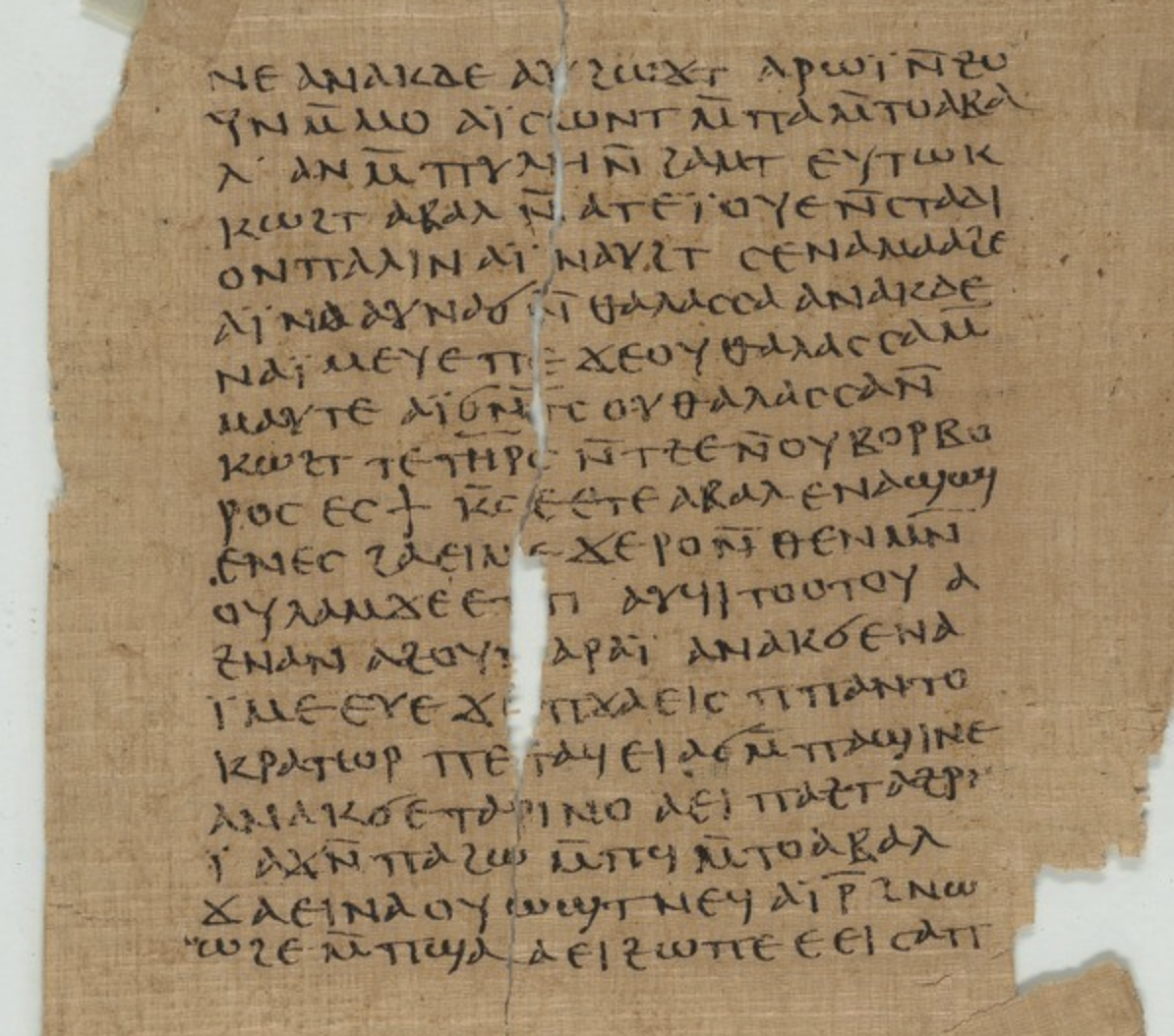
A leaf of MS Copte 135e, containing a fragment in Sahidic Coptic of the Apocalypse of Zephaniah

The Apocalypse of Zephaniah (or Apocalypse of Sophonias) is a pseudepigraphic text attributed to the Biblical prophet Zephaniah. It describes an otherworldly journey taken by Zephaniah where an angel reveals secrets of people's fates after their death, and is a work of apocalyptic literature. It is not the same as the Book of Zephaniah, a canonical work of the Twelve Minor Prophets of Judaism also found in the Christian Old Testament. It is not known for sure if it was originally written by Jews, by Christians, or was an originally Jewish work that was later edited and adapted by Christians. Similarly, the date of authorship is unknown; it may have been written at some point in the 1st century or 2nd century CE, perhaps in Koine Greek in Roman Egypt. Much of the work is lost; only fragments survived into the modern era. The surviving passages are a short possible quotation by Clement of Alexandria, a short fragment in Sahidic Coptic, and a longer fragment in Akhmimic Coptic.

== Date and origin ==
The Apocalypse of Zephaniah refers to the story of Susanna (part of the Greek Additions to Daniel, which were created around 100 BCE), and so it must have been authored later than 100 BCE (terminus post quem). Clement of Alexandria probably refers to the Apocalypse in book 5 11:77 of his Stromata (c. 200–204 CE); assuming he is referencing the Apocalypse there, then it was probably written before the last quarter of second century CE. Within this range, O. S. Wintermute suggests a more specific date of before 70 CE, because of a reference to a pro-Edomite tradition.

The text contains no mention of Jewish customs or traditions but no distinctive Christian elements either. Some passages are reminiscent of New Testament sections, but not clearly enough to know for sure. As a result, it is unknown if the work was originally Jewish, originally Christian, or if a Christian reworked a Jewish text. Roman Egypt is considered the most likely place of origin, but this cannot be said for sure, either. While the surviving manuscripts are in the Coptic language, it is speculated that these are translations of a Koine Greek original.

== Manuscripts ==
As the work was not included in either the Jewish or Christian canons, it became a lost literary work as scribes did not copy and recopy it. The existence of the Apocalypse of Zephaniah was known from ancient texts (for example the Stichometry of Nicephorus), but no details were known. The closest was the quotation by Clement of Alexandria; while he does not say anything about the Apocalypse, he believes that Zephaniah wrote something about angels in the fifth heaven, which is a story not in the canonical Book of Zephaniah. Thus, some other lost work was probably involved, and angels in layers of heaven fits with what is known of the Apocalypse.

In 1881 two fragmentary manuscripts, respectively written in Akhmimic and Sahidic Coptic dialects, and probably coming from the White Monastery in Egypt, were bought by the Bibliothèque Nationale of Paris (inventory number Copte 135) and first published by Uriel Bouriant in 1885. These fragments, together with others later bought by the Staatliche Museum of Berlin (inventory number P 1862), were published in 1899 by Steindorff who recognized in them fragments of the Apocalypse of Zephaniah, of the Apocalypse of Elijah and of another text he called The Anonymous Apocalypse. Both manuscripts were created around the 4th century, with it thought the shorter fragment could also perhaps be from the early 5th century. Emil Schürer in 1899 showed that the Anonymous Apocalypse is most probably part of the Apocalypse of Zephaniah, but there is not unanimous consensus among scholars.

== Content ==
The narrative tells of Zephaniah being taken to see the destiny of souls after death.

- In the short Sahidic fragment, a soul taken out of its body before repentance for its lawlessness is lashed by five thousand angels. Later Zephaniah sees thousands of thousands of beings with human features (with hair and teeth), but the text is interrupted.
- The Akhmimic text includes some fragmentary scenes:
  - It starts with a short fragmentary scene of a burial and with a vision of inhabitants of a town where there is no darkness, because it is the place for the righteous and the saints. Zephaniah then sees all the souls of those being punished and asks the Lord to have compassion.
  - The main vision is placed upon Mount Seir: in front of bronze gates, the angels of the Lord write down all the good deeds of the righteous, and the angels of the Accuser (the Greek word διάβολος means slanderer or accuser) write down all the sins of men, in order to accuse them when their souls leave the world. Zephaniah sees myriads of terrible angels with leopard-like faces, tusks and fiery scourges, who cast the souls of ungodly men into their eternal punishment. The seer looks back and sees a sea of flame and the Accuser, with unkempt lioness's hair, bear's teeth, and serpent body, wishing to swallow him. Zephaniah prays the Lord and the great angel Eremiel, "who is over the abyss", appears and saves him. Two scrolls are read to Zephaniah, one with all his sins and one with his good deeds on earth. The good deeds prevail over the sins and the seer is allowed to cross the river and leave Hades. On the boat he puts on an angelic garment.
  - The Akhmimic fragments ends with some scenes introduced by trumpets sounded by angels. Only three of these scenes have survived. At the first trumpet, victory over the Accuser is proclaimed, and Abraham, Isaac, Jacob, Enoch, Elijah and David are introduced. At the second trumpet, the heavens are opened and Zephaniah sees the sinful souls (which are given body and hair) tormented in a sea of flame until the day when the Lord will judge. He sees also a multitude of saints praying in intercession for those in these torments. The last trumpet mentioned in the fragments prepares for the announcement that the Lord will rise up in his wrath to destroy the earth and the heavens.

== Theology ==
The Apocalypse of Zephaniah, in accordance with the Book of Enoch, presents souls as surviving beyond death. It clearly distinguishes between the personal judgment occurring immediately after death and the final judgment by the Lord. After death the soul is sought by the fallen angels of Satan and by the angels of the Lord. Judgment is based only on the balance between good deeds and sins during the whole of life, indicating that the book was influenced by Pharisaism. Souls enter bliss or punishment immediately after the first judgment, while waiting for the Lord's coming, but the intercession of the saints makes it possible that, for some, punishment may not be definitive. This view differs from that of other contemporary texts such as 2 Enoch.
