= Apocalypse =

Concept of a prophetic unveiling, sometimes about eschatology

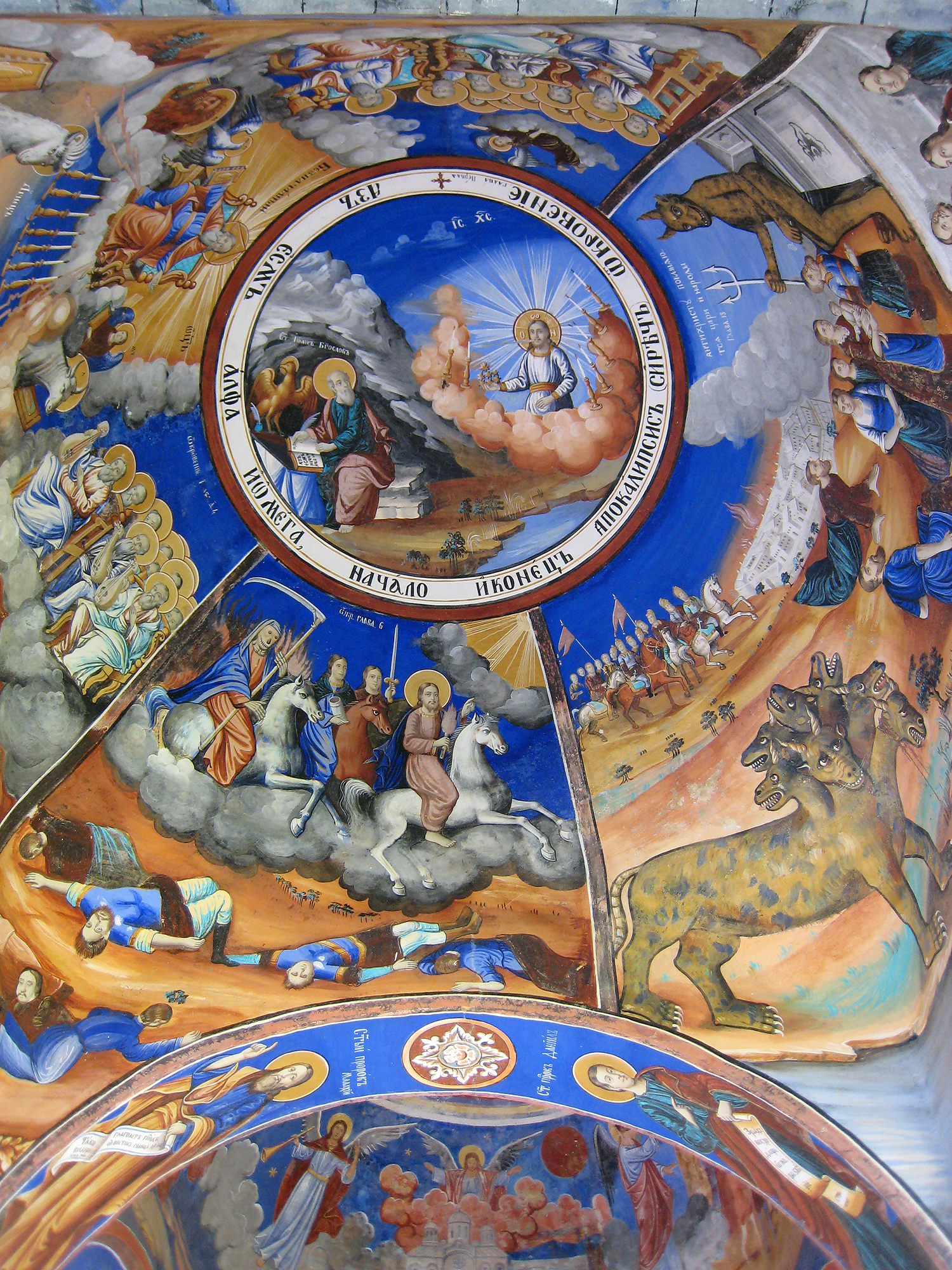
Apocalypse depicted in Christian Orthodox traditional fresco scenes in Osogovo Monastery, North Macedonia

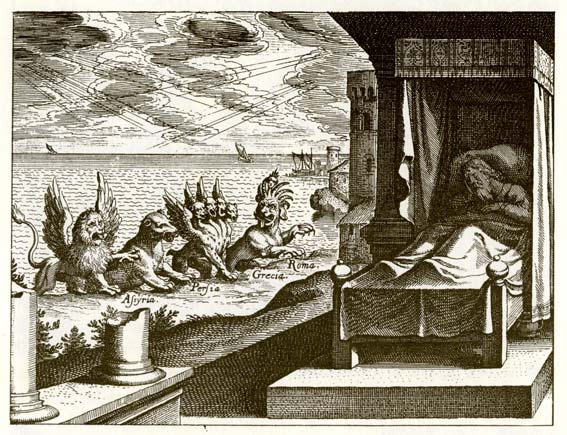
The Book of Daniel is one of the earliest instances of apocalyptic literature within the Abrahamic traditions.

In apocalypse, a supernatural being reveals cosmic mysteries or the future to a human intermediary. The means of mediation include dreams, visions and heavenly journeys, and they typically feature symbolic imagery drawn from the Jewish Bible, cosmological and (pessimistic) historical surveys, the division of time into periods, esoteric numerology, and claims of ecstasy and inspiration. It is "an unveiling or unfolding of things not previously known and which could not be known apart from the unveiling".

Apocalyptic literature (from Ancient Greek ἀποκάλυψις (apokálupsis) 'revelation, disclosure') is a literary genre originating in Judaism in the centuries following the Babylonian exile (597–587 BCE) but persisting in Christianity and Islam. Almost all are written under pseudonyms, claiming as author a venerated hero from previous centuries, as with the Book of Daniel, composed during the 2nd century BCE but bearing the name of the legendary Daniel from the 6th century BCE.

Eschatology (from Greek eschatos, last) concerns expectations of the end of the present age. Thus, apocalyptic eschatology is the application of the apocalyptic world-view to the end of the world, when God will bring judgment to the world and save his followers. An apocalypse will often contain much eschatological material like the epiphany of Paul the Apostle, but need not: the baptism of Jesus in Matthew's gospel, for example, can be considered apocalyptic in that the heavens open for the presence of a divine mediator (the dove representing the spirit of God) and a voice communicates supernatural information, but there is no eschatological element. In popular use apocalypse often means such a catastrophic end-times event, but in scholarly use the term is restricted to the visionary or revelatory event.

Scholars have identified examples of the genre ranging from the mid-2nd century BCE to the 2nd century CE, and examples are to be found in Persian and Greco-Roman literature as well as Jewish and Christian texts. The sole clear case in the Jewish Bible (Old Testament) is chapters 7–12 of the Book of Daniel, but there are many examples from non-canonical Jewish works; the Book of Revelation is the only apocalypse in the New Testament, but passages reflecting the genre are to be found in the gospels and in nearly all the genuine Pauline epistles. As a genre, apocalyptic literature details the authors' visions of the end times/end of the age as revealed by an angel or other heavenly messenger. The apocalyptic literature of Judaism and Christianity embraces a considerable period, from the centuries following the Babylonian exile down to the close of the Middle Ages.

== Definition and history ==
"Apocalypse" has come to be used popularly as a synonym for catastrophe, but the Greek word apokálypsis, from which it is derived, means a revelation. It has been defined by John J Collins as "a genre of revelatory literature with a narrative framework, in which a revelation is mediated by an otherworldly being to a human recipient, disclosing a transcendent reality which is both temporal, in that it envisages eschatological salvation, and spatial, insofar as it involves another, supernatural world." Collins later refined his definition by adding that apocalypse "is intended to interpret present, earthly circumstances in light of the supernatural world and of the future, and to influence both the understanding and the behaviour of the audience by means of divine authority."

The genre of Jewish and Christian apocalypse flourished c. 250 BCE–250 CE, but its antecedents can be traced back much further, in the Jewish prophetic and wisdom traditions (e.g., Ezekiel 1–3 and Zechariah 1–6), and in the mythologies of the Ancient Near East, which have left a legacy of symbology (e.g., the sea as a symbol of chaos in Daniel 7 and Revelation 13:1). Zoroastrian dualism may also have played a role. The reasons for its rise are obscure, but there seems to be a connection to times of crisis, such as the 2nd century BCE persecution of the Jews reflected in Daniel's final vision, or the destruction of the Temple in 70 CE reflected in 4 Ezra and 2 Baruch.

== Origins ==
Apocalyptic elements can be detected in the prophetic books of Joel and Zechariah, while Isaiah chapters 24–27 and 33 present well-developed apocalypses. The second half of the Book of Daniel (chs. 7–12) offers a fully matured and classic example of this genre of literature.

=== Unfulfilled prophecy ===
The non-fulfillment of prophecies served to popularize the methods of apocalyptic in comparison with the non-fulfillment of the advent of the Messianic kingdom. Thus, though Jeremiah had promised that after seventy years Israelites should be restored to their own land, and then enjoy the blessings of the Messianic kingdom under the Messianic king, this period passed by and things remained as of old. Some believe that the Messianic kingdom was not necessarily predicted to occur at the end of the seventy years of the Babylonian exile, but at some unspecified time in the future. The only thing for certain that was predicted was the return of the Jews to their land, which occurred when Cyrus the Persian conquered Babylon in c. 539 BCE. Thus, the fulfillment of the Messianic kingdom remained in the future for the Jews.

Haggai and Zechariah explained the delay by the failure of Judah to rebuild the temple, and so hope of the kingdom persisted, until in the first half of the 2nd century the delay is explained in the Books of Daniel and Enoch as due not to man's shortcomings but to the counsels of God. Regarding the 70 years of exile predicted in Jeremiah 29:10, the Jews were first exiled in 605 BCE in the reign of king Jehoiakim and were allowed to return to their land in c. 536 BCE when King Cyrus conquered Babylon. This period was approximately 70 years, as prophesied by Jeremiah. Others connect the 70 years of Jeremiah with the 70 weeks of years mentioned by the angel in Daniel 9. Enoch 85 interprets the 70 years of Jeremiah as the 70 successive reigns of the 70 angelic patrons of the nations, which are to come to a close in his own generation. The Book of Enoch, however, was not considered inspired Scripture by the Jews, so that any failed prophecy in it is of no consequence to the Jewish faith.

The Greek empire of the East was overthrown by Rome, and prompted a new interpretation of Daniel. The fourth and last empire was declared to be Roman by the Apocalypse of Baruch chapters 36–40 and 4 Ezra 10:60–12:35. Again, these two books were not considered inspired Scripture by the Jews, and thus were not authoritative on matters of prophecy. In addition, earlier in Daniel chapter 7 and also in chapter 2, the fourth world empire is considered to be Rome since Babylon, Medo-Persia (Achaemenid Empire), Greece, and Rome were world empires which all clearly arrived in succession.

Such ideas as those of "the day of Yahweh" and the "new heavens and a new earth" were re-interpreted by the Jewish people with fresh nuances in conformity with their new settings. Thus the inner development of Jewish apocalyptic was conditioned by the historical experiences of the nation.

=== Traditions ===
Another source of apocalyptic thought was mythological and cosmological traditions, in which the eye of the seer could see the secrets of the future. Thus the six days of the world's creation, followed by a seventh of rest, were regarded as at once a history of the past and a forecasting of the future. As the world was made in six days its history would be accomplished in six thousand years, since each day with God was as a thousand years and a thousand years as one day; and as the six days of creation were followed by one of rest, so the six thousand years of the world's history would be followed by a rest of a thousand years.

== Characteristics ==
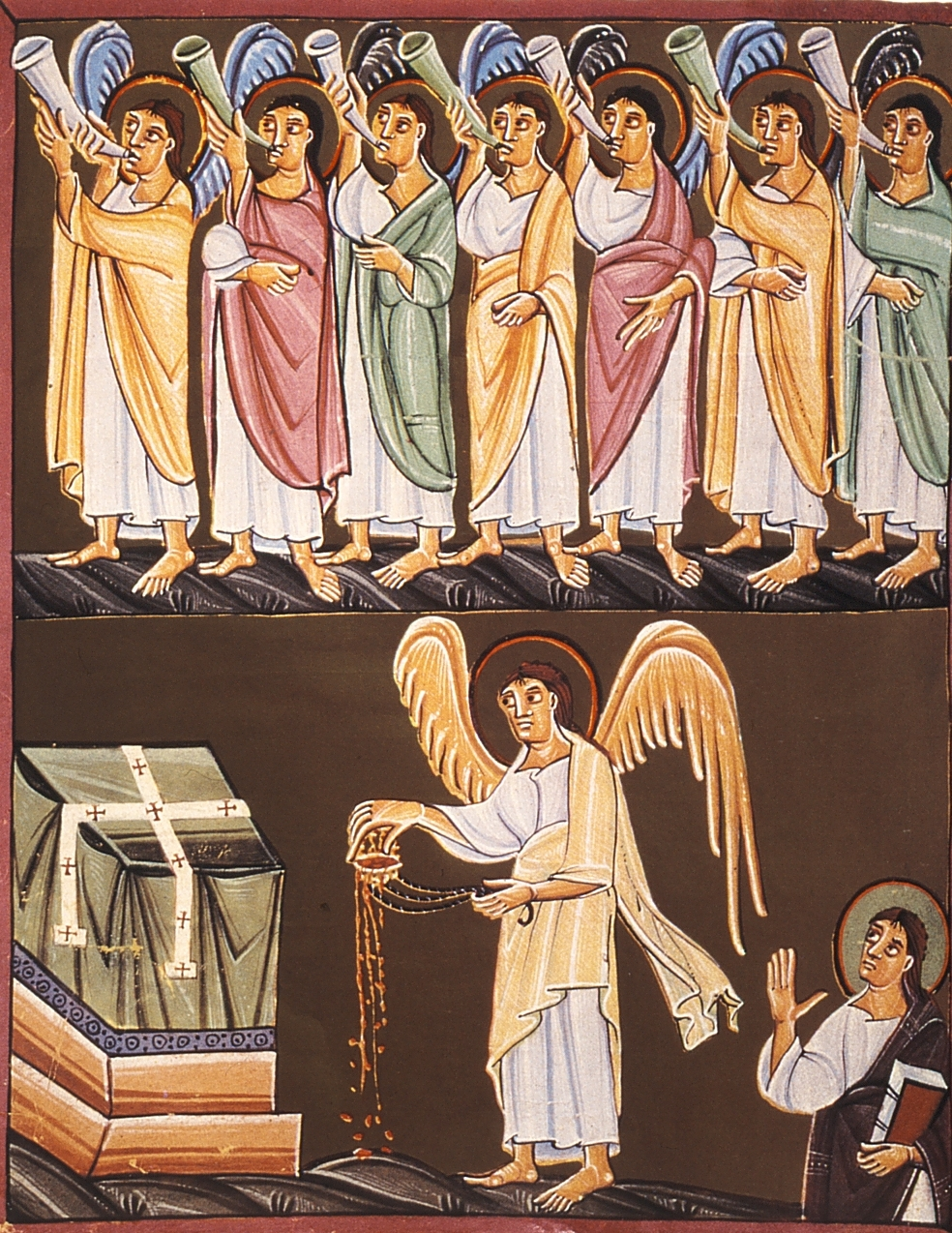
The Seven trumpets.

Apocalyptic revelations are typically mediated through such means as dreams and visions (the ancient world did not distinguish between these), angels, and heavenly journeys. These serve to connect two sets of axes, the spatial axis which has God and the heavenly realm above and the human world below, and the temporal axis of the present and the future. The revelation thus demonstrates that God rules the visible world, and that the present days are leading to an end-time in which divine justice will be done and God's rule will become visible. Mythic images with their roots in texts from the Hebrew Bible and rich in symbolic meaning are a significant characteristic of the genre. Further characteristics include transcendentalism, mythology, pessimistic cosmological and historical surveys, dualism (including a doctrine of two ages and the division of time into periods), numerology (e.g., the "number of the beast" in Revelation), claims of ecstasy and inspiration, and esotericism.

With the exception of the Apocalypse of John the authors of apocalyptic works released their books under pseudonyms (false names): the Book of Daniel, for example, was composed during the 2nd century BCE but took the name of the legendary Daniel for its hero. Pseudonymity may have been used to secure acceptance for the new works, to protect the real authors from reprisals, or because the authors had experienced what they believed to be genuine revelations from the famous past figure or identified with him and claimed to write on his behalf.

One objective of this genre of literature was to reconcile the righteousness of God with the suffering of his servants on Earth. Apocalyptic writers attempted to describe the history of the world and mankind, the origins of evil, and the final consummation of all things. They emphasized that the righteous person would achieve through resurrection the recompense that was due in the Messianic kingdom or, alternatively, in heaven itself.

== Comparison to prophecy ==
=== Message ===
There are significant similarities between the writings of the prophets and those of the apocalyptic literature. However, the message of the prophets was primarily a preaching of repentance and righteousness needed for the nation to escape judgment, while the message of the apocalyptic writers was of patience and trust for the deliverance and reward that were sure to come.

Apocalyptic literature shares with prophecy revelation through the use of visions and dreams, and these often combine reality and fantasy. In both cases, a heavenly interpreter is often provided to the receiver so that he may understand the many complexities of what he has seen. The oracles in Amos, Hosea, First Isaiah, and Jeremiah give a clear sense of how messages of imminent punishment develop into the later proto-apocalyptic literature, and eventually into the thoroughly apocalyptic literature of Daniel 7–12. The fully apocalyptic visions in Daniel 7–12, as well as those in the New Testament's Book of Revelation, can trace their roots to the pre-exilic latter biblical prophets; the sixth century BCE prophets Ezekiel, Isaiah 40–55 and 56–66, Haggai 2, and Zechariah 1–8 show a transition phase between prophecy and apocalyptic literature.

=== Dualistic theology ===
While the prophets wrote of a definite future arising out of and organically connected with the present, the apocalyptic writers despaired of the present and directed their hopes towards a new world in the future, standing in opposition to the present corrupt world. This becomes a dualistic principle, which, though it can largely be accounted for by the interaction of certain inner tendencies and outward sorrowful experience on the part of Judaism, may ultimately be derived from Mazdean influences. This principle, which shows itself in the conception that the various nations are under angelic rulers, who are in a greater or less degree in rebellion against God, as in Daniel and Enoch, grows in strength with each succeeding age, till at last Satan is conceived as "the ruler of this world" or "the god of this age."

=== Conception of history ===
Apocalyptic writing took a wider view of the world's history than did prophecy. Whereas prophecy had to deal with governments of other nations, apocalyptic writings arose at a time when Israel had been subject for generations to the sway of one or other of the great world-powers. Hence to harmonize Israel's difficulties with belief in God's righteousness, apocalyptic writing had to encompass such events in the counsels of God, the rise, duration and the downfall of each empire in turn, until, finally the lordship of the world passed into the hands of Israel, or the final judgment arrived. These events belonged in the main to the past, but the writer represented them as still in the future, arranged under certain artificial categories of time definitely determined from the beginning in the counsels of God and revealed by Him to His servants, the prophets. Determinism thus became a leading characteristic of Jewish apocalyptic, and its conception of history became mechanical.

== Jewish apocalypses ==
The revelations from heavenly messengers about the end times came in the form of angels or from people who were taken up to heaven and returned to earth with messages. The descriptions not only tell of the end times, but also describe both past and present events and their significance, often in heavily coded language. When speaking of the end times, apocalyptic literature generally includes chronologies of events that are to occur, and frequently places them in the near future, which gives a sense of urgency to the prophet's broader message. Though the understanding of the present is bleak, the visions of the future are far more positive, and include divinely delivered victory and a complete reformation of absolutely everything. Many visions of these end times mirror creation mythologies, invoke the triumph of God over the primordial forces of chaos, and provide clear distinctions between light and dark, good and evil. In such revelations, humankind is typically divided into a small group that experiences salvation, while the wicked majority is destroyed. Since the apocalyptic genre developed during the Persian period, this dualism may have developed under the influence of Persian thought. The imagery in apocalyptic literature is not realistic or reflective of the physical world as it was, but is rather surreal and fantastic, invoking a sense of wonder at the complete newness of the new order to come.

=== Canonical (including proto-apocalyptic) ===
- Isaiah 24–27; 33; 34–35; 65–66
- Jeremiah 33:14–26
- Ezekiel 38–39
- Joel 3:9–17
- Zechariah 12–14
- Daniel 7–12

Some are possibly falsely attributed works (pseudepigraphic) except for the passages from Ezekiel and Joel. Of the remaining passages and books, some consider large sections of Daniel attributable to the Maccabean period, with the rest possibly to the same period. Some consider Isaiah 33 to be written about 163 BCE; Zechariah 12–14 about 160 BCE; Isaiah 24–27 about 128 BCE; and Isaiah 34–35 sometime in the reign of John Hyrcanus. Jeremiah 33:14–26 is assigned by Marti to Maccabean times, but this is disputed.

=== Non-canonical ===
- 1 Enoch (although considered to be a deuterocanonical text by the Beta Israel Jewish community and by Oriental Orthodox Christians)
- 2 Enoch
- 3 Enoch
- Apocalypse of Abraham
- Apocalypse of Adam
- Apocalypse of Moses
- Apocalypse of Sedrach
- Apocalypse of Zephaniah
- Apocalypse of Zerubbabel
- Aramaic Apocalypse
- Gabriel's Revelation
- Genesis Apocryphon
- Greek Apocalypse of Baruch
- Greek Apocalypse of Daniel
- Greek Apocalypse of Ezra
- Sefer Elijah
- Syriac Apocalypse of Baruch

== Christian and gnostic apocalypses ==
In the transition from Jewish literature to that of early Christianity, there is a continuation of the tradition of apocalyptic prophecy. Christianity preserved the Jewish apocalyptic tradition (as Judaism developed into Rabbinism) and gave it a Christian character by a systematic process of interpolation. Christianity cultivated this form of literature and made it the vehicle of its own ideas. Christianity saw itself as the spiritual representative of what was true in prophecy and apocalyptic.

=== Canonical (New Testament) ===
- Matthew 24
- The Sheep and the Goats
- Mark 13
- Luke 21
- 2 Thessalonians 2
- 1 Timothy 4
- 2 Peter 3
- Jude 14–15
- Book of Revelation

=== Non-canonical ===
- Apocalypse of Golias
- Apocalypse of Paul
- Apocalypse of Peter
- Apocalypse of Pseudo-Methodius
- Apocalypse of Samuel of Kalamoun
- Apocalypse of Stephen
- Apocalypse of Thomas
- Coptic Apocalypse of Elijah

=== Gnostic ===
- Gnostic Apocalypse of Peter
- First Apocalypse of James
- Second Apocalypse of James
- Coptic Apocalypse of Paul

=== Contemporary art ===
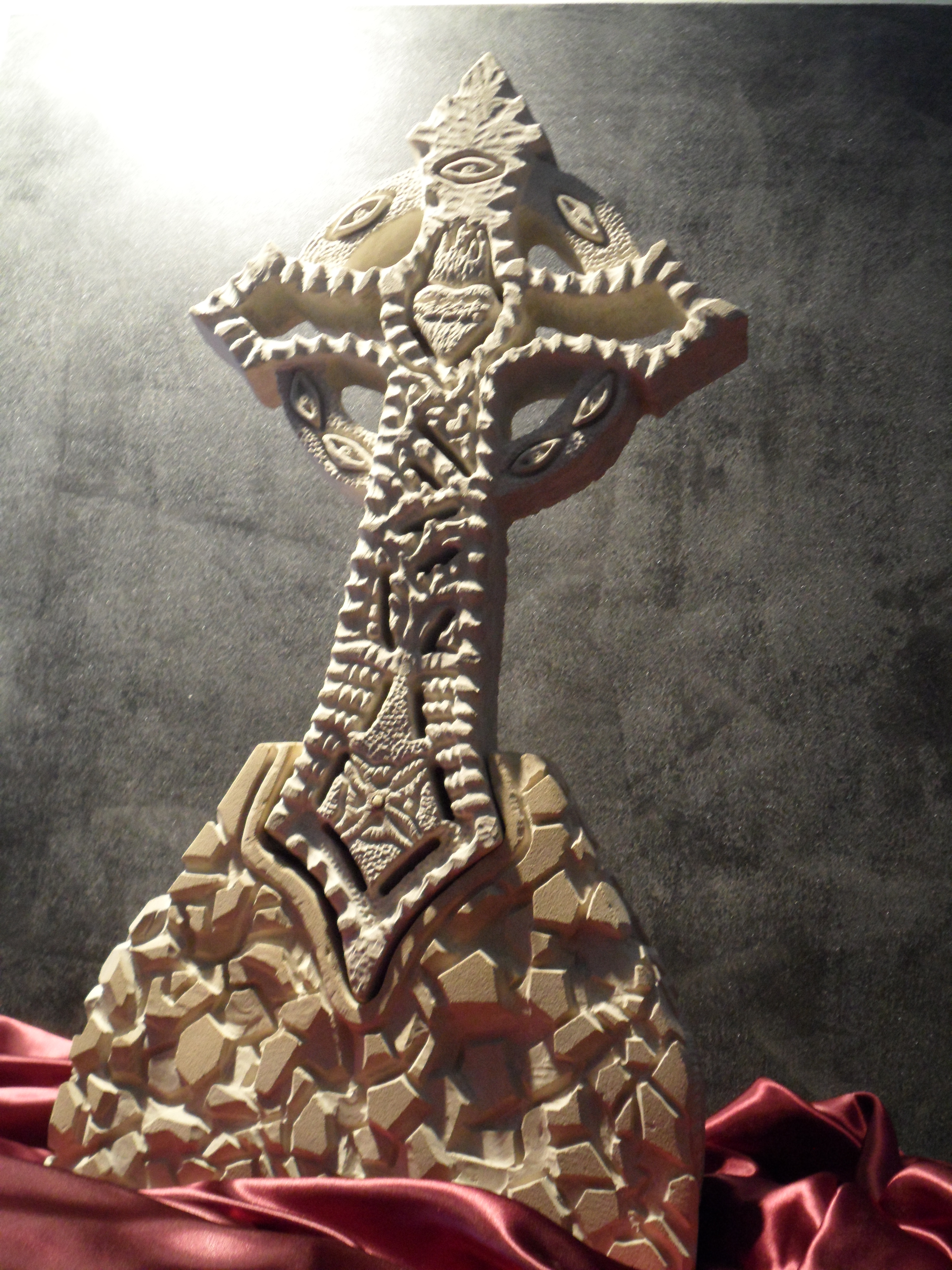
Cross of the Apocalypse (2008), Andrea da Montefeltro, Vatican City

In contemporary art, apocalyptic imagery has continued to inspire symbolic and conceptual reinterpretations. Among these, the Italian sculptor Andrea da Montefeltro created the Cross of the Apocalypse (2008), a stone sculpture commissioned by the Holy See and presented to Pope Benedict XVI. The work, installed in the Vatican, offers a symbolic elaboration inspired by themes from the Book of Revelation.

== Other ==
- Prophecy of the Popes

== See also ==
- Apocalypse Series
- Apocalypticism
- Christian eschatology
- Climate apocalypse
- Divine retribution
- Eschatology
- Islamic eschatology
- Just-world fallacy
- List of dates predicted for apocalyptic events
- Messianic Age
- Ultimate fate of the universe
