= Bacchylides of Opus =

Ancient Greek comic poet

Bacchylides (Ancient Greek: Βακχυλίδης) of Opus was a poet of ancient Greece who was also known for playing the aulos. He lived around the 5th century BCE.

We know almost nothing about his life or works, aside from the mentions of other poets who referred to him derisively. He was mocked by the comic poet Plato, around 400 BCE, in his play titled The Sophists.

The 6th-century Christian author Eusebius of Alexandria refers several times to a "Bacchylides", generally taken to be the more well known poet Bacchylides, but some prominent scholars, such as Herwig Maehler, believe at least some of these references are to Bacchylides of Opus.
