= Ernst Hammerschmidt =

Austrian/German scholar of Ethiopia (1928 – 1993)

Ernst Hammerschmidt and two monks on a boat in Lake Tana, Ethiopia in 1963

Ernst Eduard Maria Hammerschmidt (29 April 1928 – 16 December 1993) was a scholar of Ethiopia as well as Ethiopian Christianity. From 1970 to 1990 he was professor for African languages and cultures at the University of Hamburg, specializing in Ethiopian studies: history, culture, religion, and classical Ethiopic literature. He also spent much of his life as a priest in the Old Catholic Church of Austria, and served as coadjutor bishop from 1991 to 1993.

== Biography ==
Ernst Hammerschmidt was born in 1928 in Marienbad, Czechoslovakia (Mariánské Lázně); he and his family were Sudeten Germans. The German-speaking Volksdeutsche were expelled from Czechoslovakia in 1945 after the end of World War II, including Hammerschmidt and his family. He finished his high school education in Weiden in der Oberpfalz in Bavaria. He spent an extensive amount of time in higher education, studying philosophy, theology, oriental studies, and law. He attended the University of Bamberg from 1946 to 1948, the University of Innsbruck from 1949 to 1950 (gaining a licentiate of Philosophy), the theological college of St. Florian Monastery near Linz in 1950–1951, the University of Salzburg in 1951–1952 (gaining a doctorate in philosophy), and the University of Vienna in 1952–1953 (earning a doctorate in theology). This was followed by studies on liturgical texts of the Coptic Church and Ethiopian Orthodox Church at the University of Münster (Westphalia) in 1954–1955, the University of Oxford in 1955–1957 (earning a degree as Bachelor of Letters), and again at the University of Vienna in 1957–1958. He completed his habilitation in 1962 at Saarland University, where he then taught as a private lecturer. He was appointed adjunct professor there of Oriental Studies in 1968.

In 1970, Hammerschmidt gained a position as full professor for African languages and cultures in the Oriental Studies department of the University of Hamburg, where he succeeded Johannes Lukas. This shifted the focus of the department toward Ethiopian studies, Hammerschmidt's specialty. He completed a third dissertation in 1986 at the University of Vienna, this time earning a Doctor of Jurisprudence in law. Oxford awarded him a doctorate in literature in 1989; Hammerschmidt had attained four separate doctorates. He took emeritus status at Hamburg in 1990 and moved back to Austria.

Hammerschmidt married Ilse Brüner in 1955. They would go on to have two children, Ulrich and Verena.

He converted from the Roman Catholic Church to the Old Catholic Church of Austria in 1957. Hammerschmidt was ordained a priest by Bishop Stefan Török on June 27, 1958 (the Old Catholic Church allows married priests). He suspended his work with the Austrian Old Catholics when he moved to Germany (Mannheim, Saarbrücken, and Hamburg) in the 1960s, participating in the German community of Old Catholics instead. In 1990, after his retirement from Hamburg, he took on management and examination duties at the Vienna Theological Seminary of the Old Catholic Church. In July 1991, he became bishop coadjutor to Bishop Nikolaus Hummel. In August 1993 he and his wife fell out with the Old Catholic Church and converted back to the Roman Catholic Church, although he continued to work with the Old Catholic Church's journal, Internationale Kirchliche Zeitschrift.

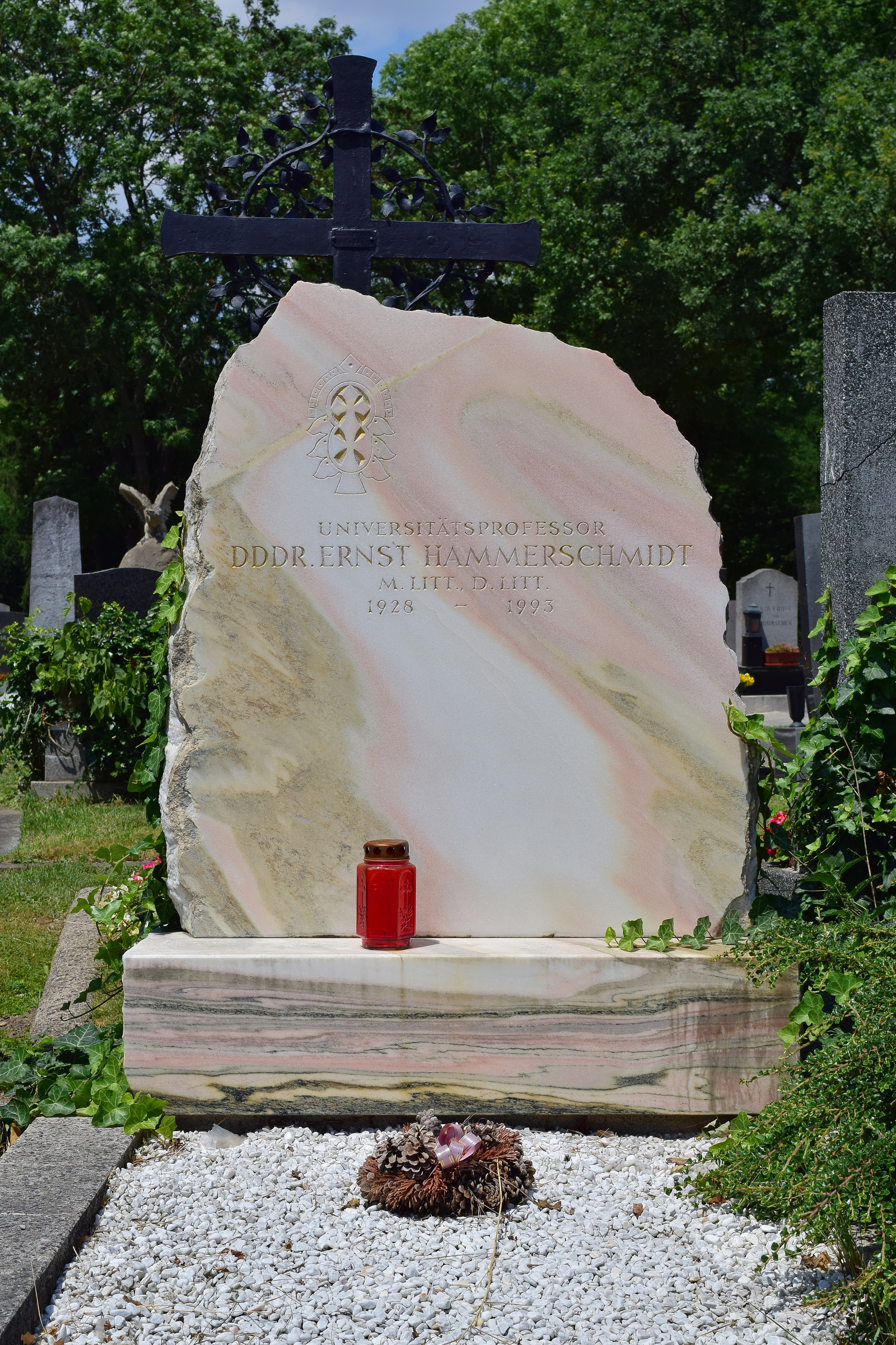
Hammerschmidt's grave at Vienna Central Cemetery

Hammerschmidt died on 16 December 1993, in a car accident in Baden bei Wien. He was buried in the Vienna Central Cemetery. His extensive private library of Ethiopian works and manuscripts was given to the Asia Africa Institute of the University of Hamburg.

== Scholarly work ==
Hammerschmidt was particularly interested in codicology (the study of manuscripts), literature in the classical Ethiopic language (Ge'ez), and the history of the Ethiopian Orthodox Church. While at Hamburg, he founded the Aethiopistische Forschungen, a scholarly monograph series focused on Ethiopian studies. He continued his involvement until his death in 1993, with the last volume he edited #35.

Much of his time in the 1960s was spent in Ethiopia where he performed his most significant scholarly work and contributions. He was on good terms with the Ethiopian Orthodox Church, in particular Abuna Theophilos, then the Archbishop of Harar (later to become Patriarch). He gained permission to undertake a cataloguing project of ancient manuscripts held on monasteries in the islands of Lake Tana, largely in classical Ge'ez (by then a liturgical language, as Amharic was used for everyday communication). Hammerschmidt photographed 31 manuscripts held at Gabriel Monastery on the island of Kebrān, 22 manuscripts on Rema Island, none on Tana Qirqos (the monks had fled for unrelated reasons), 67 manuscripts on Daga Island, and more manuscripts at Dabra Maryam monastery on a peninsula. 182 manuscripts were catalogued in total during the expeditions. Notably, this included another manuscript of the Apocalypse of Peter at Gabriel Monastery on the island of Kebrān, confirming that the older manuscript already known likely also originated from the Lake Tana region, given the very close similarities between the two.
