= Greek Apocalypse of Daniel =

The Greek Apocalypse of Daniel is a Christian pseudepigraphic text (one whose claimed authorship is unfounded) attributed to the Biblical Daniel and so associated with the Hebrew Bible (Old Testament). No Jewish or Christian groups regard this text as canonical or as authoritative scripture. The canonical Book of Daniel has much apocalyptic imagery, and this apocalyptic-style text deals with a similar subject, describing one particular vision of Daniel regarding the appearance and activities of the Antichrist before the Day of Judgement.

The text is dated to the ninth century A.D. and is extant in three Greek manuscripts, dated to the fifteenth century A.D. It was rediscovered and published at the end of nineteenth century. It should not be confused with numerous other medieval works ascribed to Daniel or to Methodius, such as the Syriac Apocalypse of Daniel of the seventh century, the Hebrew Apocalypse of Daniel of the twelfth century, or the Apocalypse of Pseudo-Methodius.

The Apocalypse of Daniel has been written in Greek in the Byzantine Empire about the early years of the ninth century AD. The original date of certain elements could be centuries earlier than that of the document as a whole.

This text can be divided in two sections. The first one (chapters 1–7) recounts under the form of a prediction (vaticinium ex eventu) the Byzantine–Arab War of the eighth century and the enthronement of Charlemagne. The remaining chapters (8–14) describe the origin and personal characteristics of the Antichrist.
