= Acherusia =

Ancient Greek mythological place name

In Greek mythology, Acherusia (Ancient Greek: Ἀχερουσία λίμνη, romanized: Akherousía límnē or Ἀχερουσίς, Akherousís) was a name given by the ancients to several lakes or swamps, which, like the various rivers called Acheron, were at some time believed to be connected with the underworld, until at last the Acherusia came to be considered to be in the lower world itself.

== Locations of the lakes ==
The lake to which this belief seems to have been first attached was the Acherusia in Thesprotia, through which the river Acheron flowed. Other lakes or swamps of the same name, and believed to be in connection with the lower world, were near Hermione in Argolis, near Heraclea in Bithynia, between Cumae and cape Misenum in Campania, and lastly in Egypt, near Memphis.

== Acherusia as a cavern ==
In Greek mythology, it was also the name of a cavern through which Heracles dragged Cerberus as one of his Twelve Labors.

== Location of cleansing ==
In Plato's Phaedo, souls are divided into four different categories. Evil souls are sent to Tartarus; good souls are sent onward to pure places of the world; but neutral souls as well as repentant people who performed great crimes are not immediately sent to their next realm. Neutral souls are cleansed in the Acherusian Lake before proceeding onward, similar to good souls but slower. People who committed great evil yet were repentant can hope their victims invite them into Acherusia where they can undergo the cleansing process.

== Role in Christianity ==
Early Christianity adopted various terms and concepts from Greek mythology, especially among Greek pagans who converted to Pauline Christianity, including the Acherusian Lake, Elysian Fields, and Hades. The early Greek Christian view seems especially influenced by the fate of the fourth group described by Plato, with Acherusia a place for repentant sinners to be cleansed, possibly at the invitation of those whom they wronged. The 2nd-century Apocalypse of Peter describes how prayers for the dead by saints in heaven would move God to give a postmortem baptism or washing of damned souls in hell in the Acherusian Lake, allowing them into paradise after a period of cleansing suffering. The account in the Apocalypse of Peter is quoted in the Sibylline Oracles and several other works.

In the 4th-century Apocalypse of Paul, the archangel Michael washes souls in the Acherusian Lake before their entry into the City of Christ in Paradise. The 3rd- to 5th-century Apocalypse of Moses features a story where Adam is washed in the Acherusian Lake before being brought to converse with God, presumably to ensure his ritual purity. The Book of the Resurrection of Jesus Christ, by Bartholomew the Apostle, an 8th- to 9th-century work, features a tour of the afterlife; after the narrator passes through the river of fire (which does not actually harm the godly, for whom it seems like a normal river of water), the angel Michael washes him three times in the Acherusian Lake before proceeding deeper into heaven.
