= Apocalypse of Elijah =

2nd-4th century Christian text

The Apocalypse of Elijah is an early Christian work written in the Coptic language commonly held to be a documentation of the oral presentation of multiple original and classical manuscripts. Presented in part as the direct word of the Hebrew God, Yahweh, to the biblical prophet Elijah, from where its name is derived, the text includes a short commentary on some early Christian fasting and prayer disciplines, a prophetic message about the kingdoms of Assyria and Egypt, and accounts of the presentation of the antichrist, his encounters with Elijah and Enoch, and his ultimate demise.

Although it is given the title of apocalypse, it does not have many of the usual traits of a classical apocalypse; yet, it ties together critical themes of apocalyptic literature such as kingdom eschatology and antichrist imagery.

There is another Apocalypse of Elijah dating from the 3rd–7th centuries (Sefer Elijah or Sefer Eliahu) written in Hebrew to a Jewish audience, but it does not appear to share any significant similarities or inspiration from the Coptic, Christian work.

== Title, author, and setting ==
Contrary to what the title would suggest, the Coptic text is not often formally considered to be an apocalypse in genre, nor is it believed to be written or influenced by the biblical prophet Elijah. The prophet's inclusion twice within the text presents a likely origin for the name, though his mention is always immediately connected in proximity to the biblical figure of Enoch.

Additionally, around the time of the manuscript’s potential origin within the Christian communities in Egypt (discussed in detail below), there is evidence for the existence of multiple pseudepigraphic works attributed to the prophet Elijah, most famously referenced by the 4th century theologian Didymus the Blind. These texts included another apocalyptic work elucidating a revelation to Elijah of the nature of hell, much in the same manner as the Apocalypses of Peter and of Paul.

There is another text called the Apocalypse of Elijah that is referenced by both Origen and Jerome, early Christian scholars, that was subject to debate concerning its relationship to Paul the Apostle's first letter to the Corinthians. This debate arose around the section of 1 Corinthians 2:9: "which the eye has not seen, nor the ear heard," which Origen attributed first to the Apocalypse of Elijah while Jerome held that Paul likely did not cite the apocalypse. Whatever the case may be, this phrase is not found in any of the existing forms of the Apocalypse of Elijah and thus suggests an entirely separate variant. Whether this text is the very same as that detailing Elijah's journey through hell is unknown.

Together, these pseudepigraphic works allude to a period of time in early Christianity where Elijah was considered to be an important biblical figure and his name was associated with a number of circulating manuscripts. More specifically, there is reason to believe that early Egyptian Christian scribes, suspected first because of the existing Coptic renditions of the text, would have had both a literary basis and a religious basis for pseudonymously ascribing the work to Elijah.

Firstly, there are a host of recessional documents and original texts coming from that era that establish a tradition of Elijah receiving revelations, putting him as a prime pseudonymous author. Secondly, there are stories of Egyptian Christians taking on the names of prophets such as Elijah in place of their own, and there are numerous monastic traditions of piety surrounding the life and 'monastic' practices of Elijah that paint a strong picture of Elijah as a significant religious figure in the Coptic tradition. Finally, within the text itself, in chapter 2, there are many references to Egypt as the site of many of the coming events predicted within the text, solidifying the notion that the authors were Christians living in Egypt at the time.

== Date ==
The bulk of the text is commonly dated anywhere between the middle of the 2nd century to the beginning of the 4th century. The text is clearly influenced by Christian thinking, with references to Christian manuscripts such as Revelation that could have only become available past the middle of the 2nd century, yet the earliest known Coptic fragments date back to the beginning of the 4th century.

Earlier dates stem from the notion that, given the reality that pieces of the text were likely originally written in Greek and subsequently translated into Coptic, it is probable that there existed forms of a written text as early as the end of the 2nd century, later given oral manifestation in Egypt which was subsequently transcribed.

The Apocalypse of Elijah is mentioned in the Apostolic Constitutions, the List of the Sixty Books, the Synopsis of Holy Scripture, the Stichometry of Nicephorus, and the Armenian list of Mechithar establishing it firmly within this era of early Christianity. Origen, Ambrosiaster, and Euthalius ascribe First Epistle to the Corinthians 2:9 to it:

Eye hath not seen, nor ear heard, neither have entered into the heart of man, the things which God hath prepared for them that love him.

If they are right, the apocalypse is pre-Pauline. The peculiar form in which this quotation appears in Clement of Alexandria, Protrepticus x. 94, and the Apostolic Constitutions vii. 32, shows that both have the same source, probably this apocalypse.

Additionally, Epiphanius ascribes to this work Eph. 5:14, "Awake thou that sleepest, and arise from the dead, and Christ shall give thee light."

There is some question regarding the potential for the Coptic (and presumably the Greek) fragments to be drawing upon and re-interpreting a much earlier Jewish manuscript which could have been dated anywhere as early as the 1st century BCE; however, there is yet to be any significant evidence for the existence of such a text.

== Genre ==
The content of the Apocalypse of Elijah only somewhat resembles any classical definition of an apocalypse. An apocalypse, according to historian John J. Collins, can be defined as “a genre of revelatory literature with a narrative framework, in which a revelation is mediated by an otherworldly being to a human recipient, disclosing a transcendent reality which is both temporal, insofar as it envisages eschatological salvation, and spatial insofar as it involves another, supernatural world.”

The Apocalypse of Elijah only loosely meets some of these specifications. For instance, there is no otherworldly creature to reveal the mysteries of the text to the author, at least not one that is stated in the text. Additionally, the temporo-spatial components are both relatively non-specific. However, though it may not fit into the ideal format, there are many aspects to the apocalypse which relate themselves to past apocalyptic works, including imagery of a figure who opposes Christ like the antichrist of the Book of Revelation, resurrection from the dead, a final judgement, and the section on the martyrdom of Elijah and Enoch which mirrors very closely the two witnesses in Revelation 11. It is in its replication of a number of other apocalyptic manuscripts that the text comes to take on its reputation as an apocalypse in early antiquity.

== Manuscript history ==
Two of the foundational Coptic texts of the Apocalypse of Elijah were edited and published by George Steindorff near the end of the 19th century, one of which was obtained from St. Shenoute's White Monastery, has been dated to the early 4th century and contained the beginning and conclusion of the text, but was missing most of the middle portion. Another incredibly important manuscript dated to the 4th or 5th century is that published through the Chester Beatty Library, which to this day is the most complete variant of the text to be discovered.

There exists a papyrus fragment dated to 4th century which is written in ancient Greek and includes only a small section of the end of the Apocalypse of Elijah. Additionally, this Greek text does not entirely overlap any of the other manuscripts discovered, which suggests that it may be an iteration of an earlier alternative Greek manuscript.

== Textual outline ==
Notable translations of the Apocalypse of Elijah include that of O. S. Wintermute in his chapter in The Old Testament Pseudepigrapha and the original translation of Albert Pietersma and Susan Turner Cornstock with Harold W. Attridge, which is available through the Chester Beatty Library.

1. God’s word on salvation, his true sons, and fasting
  1. God’s addresses the people through the presumed author (1:1–2)
  2. The Lord enacts His salvation and mercy through His Son (1:37)
  3. God’s plans for those who obey Him and for the sinners is revealed (1:8–12)
    1. God’s sons are taken to heaven, while the sinners are given to death
  4. The wise men are warned of deceivers who speak lies about the practice of fasting (1:13–14)
  5. Rules and reasons are given for fasting (1:15–22)
    1. Fasting is presented as a blessing to man, with the capability to heal and cast out demons
    2. Warnings are given against impure fasting
  6. The audience is implored to remain single-minded in the Lord (1:23–27)
2. The fate of Assyria and Egypt
  1. The king of Assyria, also called the king of injustice, brings disruption to Egypt (2:1–5)
  2. “The king of peace” kills the king of injustice, creates a false peace, and establishes the heathens (2:6–16)
  3. The king and his two sons capture the saints and offer unrighteous sacrifices (2:17–28)
  4. An account of the tragedies which will befall Egypt (2:29–38)
    1. Violence against poor ceases and the markets are silenced
    2. The people will desire death but not die
    3. Nursing women and mothers will grieve while virgins rejoice over their barrenness
  5. The Persians kill the Assyrian king, the saints are restored to abundance, and the dead are commanded to rise (2:39–53)
3. The son of lawlessness presented
  1. The son of lawlessness falsely calls himself “the Christ” (3:1)
  2. Signs of the true Christ (3:2-4)
    1. Comes with the sign of the cross
    2. Surrounded by angels
  3. Deceptive signs of the son of lawlessness (3:5-11)
    1. Physical wonders
    2. Miracles of healing and casting out demons
  4. True signs of the lawlessness (3:12-18)
    1. Cannot give life
    2. “Tuft of gray hair at the front of his bald head”
    3. Shifting ages from young to old
4. The virgin, Elijah, and Enoch shame the son of lawlessness
  1. Tabitha, the virgin, scolds the son of lawlessness up to Jerusalem, is killed by him only to rise again and become a source of healing blood to the people (4:1-6)
  2. Elijah and Enoch appear to fight and argue with the son of lawlessness (4:7-12)
  3. The shameless one kills Elijah and Enoch in the market place (4:13-14)
  4. Elijah and Enoch are resurrected and taunt the son of lawlessness (4:15-16)
  5. The son of lawlessness retaliates by torturing and killing the saints of the land, save only a few survivors who flee (4:17-24)
  6. The Lord receives and resurrects those who have died and grants them favor and rule (4:25-30)
  7. The saints return to fight the son of lawlessness, who grows angry and burns the righteous ones (4:31-33)
5. Christ battles the son of lawlessness and God brings final judgment
  1. Many see the deception of the son of lawlessness (5:1)
  2. Christ sends angels to the earth who strengthen the saints and grant them access to the tree of life (5:2-6)
  3. The earth is disturbed and the waters dry up (5:7-9)
  4. Those deceived by the son of lawlessness cry out against him and seek to worship the righteous one (5:10-14)
  5. The son of lawlessness makes his final threats against the saints (5:15-20)
  6. The angels come to earth and the Lord sends fire to consume the sinners and devils (5:21-23)
  7. YHWH begins his “true judgment” (5:24-31)
    1. Sinners meet their sins where they were committed
    2. Saints will see the place of torment and sinners will see the righteous place
    3. YHWH judges both heaven and earth, shepherd and flock
  8. Elijah and Enoch return to finally kill the son of lawlessness and case him into the abyss (5:32-35)
  9. Christ and the saints come from heaven to spend a thousand years upon the earth before burning it to create a new heaven and new earth (5:36-39)

== Theological backgrounds and themes ==
To discuss the theological themes of the Apocalypse of Elijah is a difficult task, as its origin, date, and purpose are all subjects of debate. The text seamlessly weaves in both Christian and Jewish themes that makes it hard to discern which section ascribes to which line of thinking.

Generally, there are strong themes of false leadership and the signs of the saints vs. that of the sinners throughout the text, from warnings given to the "wise men of the land" against the "deceivers" in 1:13 to the 'sinners' in 5:11 grieving because they believed the false signs of the son of lawlessness. In this same vein, some of the signs of the true Christ are also presented in chapter 2, such as his arrival being heralded by hosts of angels or his ability to raise the dead. The work also introduces the concept of marks which identify the people who belong to God, found on both their foreheads and wrists, which are mentioned in both 1:9 and 5:4. There markings are reminiscent of the seals of the 144,000 from Revelation 7:3-4.

There are also very clear references to the idea of resurrection throughout the text, which was a very proliferative concept in early Christian apocalyptic literature, such as Revelation, but which had previously found tremendous traction in the Jewish apocalyptic texts such as Daniel, the Book of Enoch, and later works such as 2 Baruch and 4 Ezra. In the Apocalypse of Elijah, resurrection manifests in a few distinct ways.

The first instance, and by far the strangest, is found in 2:53, where the "remnant" recently freed by the Persians approach the dead and say, "Rise up and be with us in this rest." Whether these dead do in fact rise is undisclosed, yet it is significant that it is not often humans are raising humans in these apocalyptic texts. There is also a section, 3:12, which mentions that the son of lawlessness does not have the power to raise the dead as the Christ did.

Stories of the resurrection of the saints in chapter 4:27, as well as of Tabitha the virgin and Elijah and Enoch in chapter 4 reflect clear Christian themes of martyrdom. This tradition of literary depictions of martyrdom became popular early on in the history of the church and tended to serve as a sort of sign of the end of days.

A section in Chapter 5 is considered by some scholars to reference the original Apocalypse of Peter, as 5:27-29 seemingly discusses how the righteous may ask for the salvation of sinners in torment, and an act of grace will occur.

== Figures in the Apocalypse of Elijah ==
- Elijah
- Enoch
- Gabriel
- Son of God
- Son of Man (presumed author of chapter one)
- Son of lawlessness
- Tabitha (The virgin)
- The Christ
- The devil
- The king of Assyria (king of injustice)
- The king of peace
- The priests
- The saints
- The sons of the king of peace
- The wise men
- Uriel
- Yahweh (God)

== See also ==
- Apocalypse of Paul
- Apocalyptic literature
- Revelation of John
- The Apocalypse of Peter
