= Epistle of Barnabas =

Greek Christian text (AD 70–200)

The Epistle of Barnabas (Ancient Greek: Βαρναβᾶ Ἐπιστολή) is an early Christian Greek epistle written between 70 and 135 AD. The complete text is preserved in the 4th-century Codex Sinaiticus, where it is positioned at the end of the New Testament, following the Book of Revelation and preceding the Shepherd of Hermas.

For several centuries, the epistle was categorized among the "antilegomena" ("disputed writings"); while some early Christians regarded it as sacred scripture, others excluded it. Eusebius of Caesarea classified it with excluded texts. It is mentioned in a perhaps third-century list in the sixth century Codex Claromontanus and in the later Stichometry of Nicephorus appended to the ninth-century Chronography of Nikephoros I of Constantinople. Some early Fathers of the Church ascribed it to the Barnabas mentioned in the Acts of the Apostles, but it is now generally attributed to an otherwise unknown early Christian teacher (though some scholars do defend the traditional attribution). It is distinct from the Gospel of Barnabas.

The central message of the Epistle of Barnabas is that the writings comprising the Hebrew Bible—what would become the Old Testament of the Christian Bible—were, from even their times of authorship, written for use by Christians rather than the Israelites and, by extension, the Jews. According to the epistle, the Jews had misinterpreted their own law (i.e., halakha) by applying it literally; the true meaning was to be found in its symbolic prophecies foreshadowing the coming of Jesus of Nazareth, whom Christians believe to be the messiah. Furthermore, the author posits that the Judaizers were misled by an evil angel, as they were attempting to impose a literal circumcision on Christians. After explaining its Christian interpretations of the Jewish scriptures, the epistle concludes by discussing the "Two Ways", also seen in the Didache: a "Way of Light" and a "Way of Darkness".

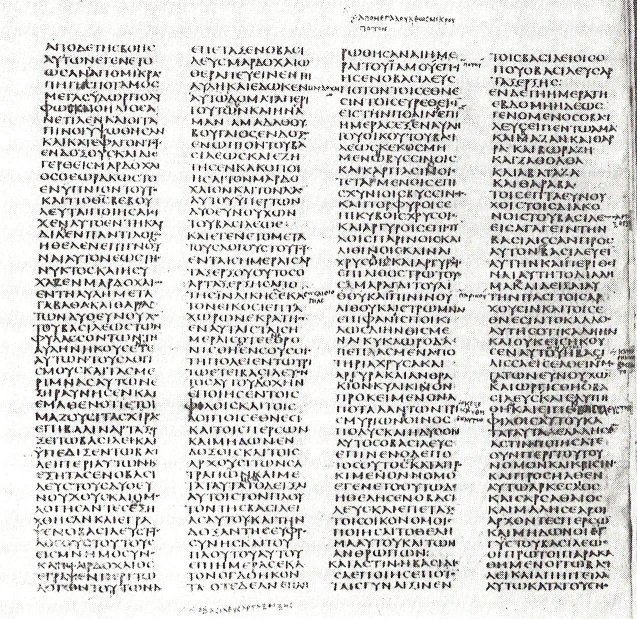
The Codex Sinaiticus contains the Epistle of Barnabas under the heading ΒΑΡΝΑΒΑ ΕΠΙΣΤΟΛΗ. beginning at Quire 91, folio 2r, col. 2.

== Manuscript tradition ==
The 4th-century Codex Sinaiticus (S), discovered by Constantin von Tischendorf in 1859 and published by him in 1862, contains a complete text of the Epistle placed after the canonical New Testament and followed by the Shepherd of Hermas. The 11th-century Codex Hierosolymitanus (H), which also includes the Didache, the two Epistles of Clement and the longer version of the Letters of Ignatius of Antioch, is another witness to the full text. It was discovered by Philotheos Bryennios at Constantinople in 1873 and published by him in 1875. Adolf Hilgenfeld used it for his 1877 edition of the Epistle of Barnabas. A family of 10 or 11 manuscripts dependent on the 11th-century Codex Vaticanus graecus 859 (G) contain chapters 5:7b−21:9 placed as a continuation of a truncated text of Polycarp's letter to the Philippians (1:1–9:2). An old Latin version (L), perhaps of no later than the end of the 4th century, that is preserved in a single 9th-century manuscript (St Petersburg, Q.v.I.39) gives the first 17 chapters (without the "Two Ways" section of chapters 18 to 21). This is a fairly literal rendering in general, but is sometimes significantly shorter than the Greek text. S and H generally agree on readings. G often agrees with L against S and H. A small papyrus fragment (PSI 757) of the third or fourth century has the first 6 verses of chapter 9, and there are a few fragments in Syriac of chapters 1, 19, 20. The writings of Clement of Alexandria give a few brief quotations, as to a smaller extent do Origen, Didymus the Blind and Jerome.

== Status for Christians ==
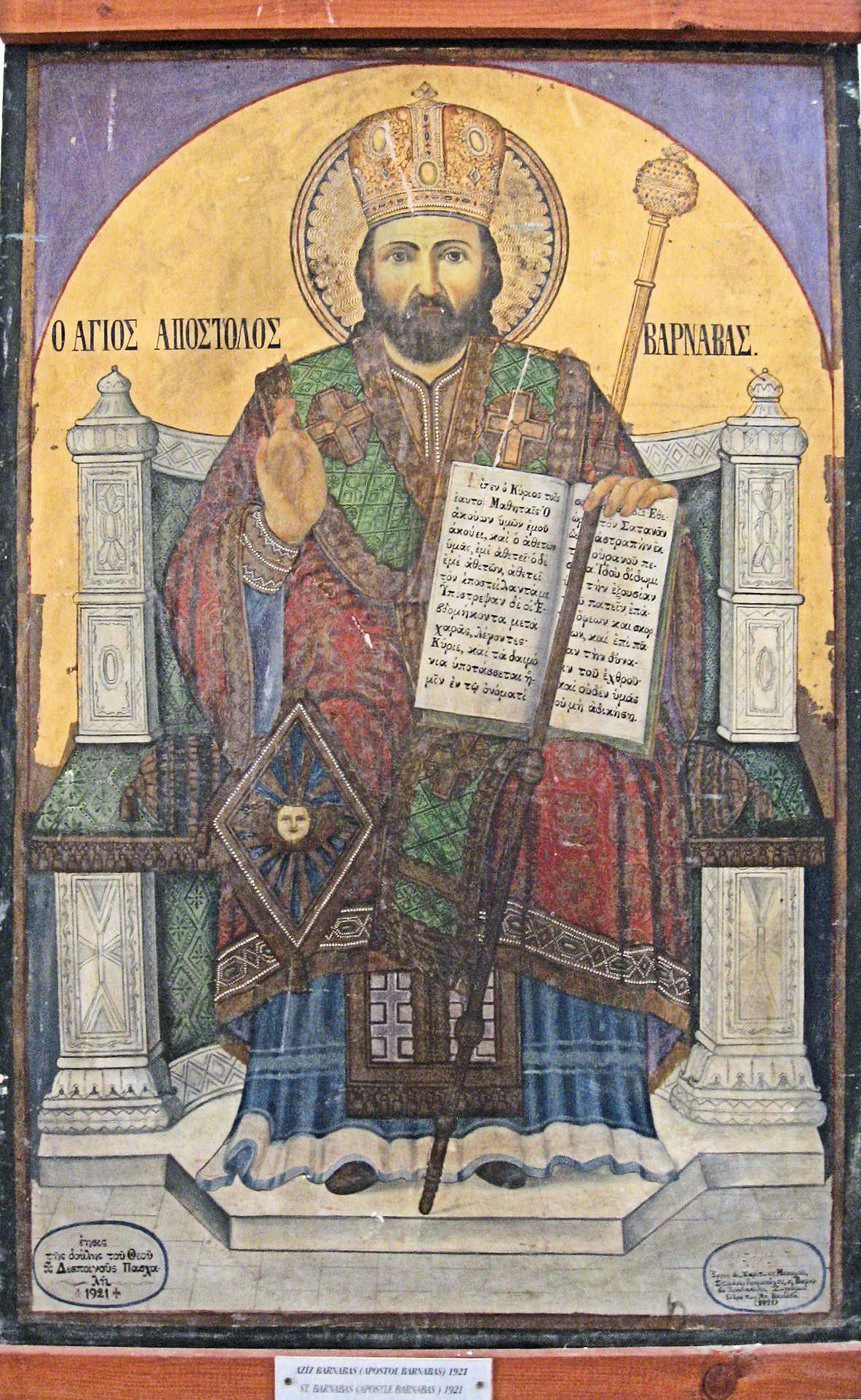
Icon of Saint Barnabas with the text of Luke 10:16−19

The Epistle was viewed as authoritative scripture by some Christians in the early centuries of church history. It was attributed to Barnabas, the companion of Paul the Apostle, by Clement of Alexandria (c. 150 – c. 215) and Origen (c. 184 – c. 253). Clement quotes it with phrases such as "the Apostle Barnabas says." Origen speaks of it as "the General Epistle of Barnabas", a phrase usually associated with canonical non-Pauline epistles.

In the fourth century, the Epistle was also highly regarded by Didymus the Blind (c. 313 – c. 398), Serapion of Thmuis (c. 290 – c. 358), and Jerome (c. 342–420) as an authentic work of the apostolic Barnabas. Its inclusion in close proximity to the New Testament writings in Codex Sinaiticus and Codex Claromontanus witnesses to the canonical or near-canonical authority it held for some Christians, though it is argued by some that this is evidence merely of its popularity and usefulness, not necessarily of canonicity.

Eusebius (c. 260 – c. 340), in book three of his Church History, excluded it from "the accepted books", classifying it as among the "rejected" or "spurious" (νόθοι) writings, although he elsewhere included this same Epistle of Barnabas with Hebrews and Jude in the category of "disputed scriptures" (ἀντιλεγομένων γραφῶν).

In the sixth century, Codex Claromontanus (a list of Old Testament and New Testament books, dating from the third or fourth century) includes the Epistle of Barnabas between Jude and Revelation along with the Shepherd of Hermas, the Acts of Paul and the Apocalypse of Peter. Next to the listing of Barnabas is a dash (most likely added some time later) that may indicate doubtful or disputed canonicity, though the same marking is found next to 1 Peter as well, so its meaning is unclear.

The Stichometry of Nicephorus, a later list of uncertain date appended to the Chronography of the early 9th century Nikephoros I of Constantinople, puts the Epistle of Barnabas among its four "disputed" New Testament works—along with the Book of Revelation, the Revelation of Peter and the Gospel of the Hebrews—but not among its seven "New Testament apocrypha".

== Date of composition ==
In 16.3–4, the Epistle of Barnabas reads:

Furthermore he says again, "Behold, those who tore down this temple will themselves build it." It is happening. For because of their fighting it was torn down by the enemies. And now the very servants of the enemies will themselves rebuild it.

As commonly interpreted, this passage places the Epistle after the destruction of the Second Temple in AD 70. It also places the Epistle before the Bar Kokhba revolt of AD 132, after which there could have been no hope that the Romans would help to rebuild the temple. The document must therefore come from the period between the two Jewish revolts. Attempts at identifying a more precise date are conjectures. The Encyclopædia Britannica puts the latest possible date at AD 130, and gives the actual date of composition at "circa AD 100". Its 1911 edition opted strongly for "the reign of Vespasian (AD 70–79)", shortly after the Catholic Encyclopedia had preferred AD 130−131 in an article by Paulin Ladeuze, and AD 96−98 in an article by John Bertram Peterson. On a more precise dating within the limits associated with the Jerusalem temple there is thus an "absence of scholarly consensus".

Jay Curry Treat comments on the absence in the Epistle of Barnabas of citations from the New Testament (except for a possible reference to the phrase "Many are called, but few are chosen" in the Gospel according to Matthew):

Although Barnabas 4:14 appears to quote Matt 22:14, it must remain an open question whether the Barnabas circle knew written gospels. Based on Koester's analysis (1957: 125–27, 157), it appears more likely that Barnabas stood in the living oral tradition used by the written gospels. For example, the reference to gall and vinegar in Barnabas 7:3, 5 seems to preserve an early stage of tradition that influenced the formation of the passion narratives in the Gospel of Peter and the synoptic gospels.

J. E. Jacquier on different opinion, pointing to the fact that the reference to Matthew 22:14 is proceeded by the words "as the scripture says" (os gegraptai) which not only shows that the words are a quotation but according to him "proves that the author considered the Gospel of Matthew equal in point of authority to the writings of the Old Testament".

Helmut Koester considers the Epistle to be earlier than the Gospel of Matthew: in his Introduction to the New Testament he says of the author of the Epistle: "It cannot be shown that he knew and used the Gospels of the New Testament. On the contrary, what Barnabas presents here is from 'the school of the evangelists'. This demonstrates how the early Christian communities paid special attention to the exploration of Scripture in order to understand and tell the suffering of Jesus. Barnabas still represents the initial stages of the process that is continued in the Gospel of Peter, later in Matthew, and is completed in Justin Martyr."

John Finnis has recently argued that the Epistle may have been written around the year 40 AD, proposing that chapter 16 refers instead to the destruction of the First Temple in 587 BC.

An opposing view is enunciated by Everett Ferguson: "The language of rebuilding the temple in 16.3–5 refers to the spiritual temple of the heart of Gentile believers (any allusion to a physical temple in Jerusalem is doubtful)." On the date of composition he says: "The Epistle of Barnabas is usually dated to 130−135, although an earlier date in the late 70s has had its champions, and 96−98 is a possibility."

== Provenance ==
The place of origin is generally taken to be Alexandria in Egypt. It is first attested there (by Clement of Alexandria). Its allegorical style points to Alexandria. Barnabas 9:6 mentions idol-worshipping priests as circumcised, a practice in use in Egypt. However, some scholars have suggested an origin in Syria or Asia Minor.

Treat comments on the provenance of the Epistle of Barnabas:

Barnabas does not give enough indications to permit confident identification of either the teacher's location or the location to which he writes. His thought, hermeneutical methods, and style have many parallels throughout the known Jewish and Christian worlds. Most scholars have located the work's origin in the area of Alexandria, on the grounds that it has many affinities with Alexandrian Jewish and Christian thought and because its first witnesses are Alexandrian. Recently, Prigent (Prigent and Kraft 1971: 20–24), Wengst (1971: 114–18), and Scorza Barcellona (1975: 62–65) have suggested other origins based on affinities in Palestine, Syria, and Asia Minor. The place of origin must remain an open question, although the Gk-speaking E. Mediterranean appears most probable.

== Contents ==
The Epistle of Barnabas has the form not so much of a letter (it lacks indication of identity of sender and addressees), but as of a treatise. In this, it is like the Epistle to the Hebrews, which Tertullian ascribed to the apostle Barnabas and with which it has "a large amount of superficial resemblance". On the other hand, it does have some features of an epistolary character, and Reidar Hvalvik argues that it is in fact a letter.

The document can be divided into two parts. Chapters 1−17 give a Christ-centred interpretation of the Old Testament, which it says should be understood spiritually, not in line with the literal meaning of its rules on sacrifice (chapter 2: the sacrifice God wants is that of a contrite heart), fasting (3: the fasting God wants is from injustice), circumcision (9), diet (10: rules that really prohibit behaviour such as praying to God only when in need, like swine crying out when hungry but ignoring their master when full, or being predatory like eagle, falcon, kite and crow, etc.; and that command to chew by meditating the cud of the word of the Lord and to divide the hoof by looking for the holy world to come while walking in this world), sabbath (15), and the temple (16). The passion and death of Jesus at the hands of the Jews, it says, is foreshadowed in the properly understood rituals of the scapegoat (7) and the red heifer (8) and in the posture assumed by Moses in extending his arms (according to the Greek Septuagint text known to the author of the Epistle) in the form of the execution cross, while Joshua, whose name in Greek is Ἰησοῦς (Jesus), fought against Amalek (12). The last four chapters, 18−21, are a version of The Two Ways teaching that appears also in chapters 1−5 of the Didache.

As viewed by Andrew Louth, the author "is simply concerned to show that the Old Testament Scriptures are Christian Scriptures and that the spiritual meaning is their real meaning". As viewed by Bart D. Ehrman, the Epistle of Barnabas is "more anti-Jewish than anything that did make it into the New Testament".

=== Midrash and gematria ===
According to David Dawson, "the Jewish mind-set of Barnabas, evident in its choice of images and examples, is unmistakable". He says that the work's two-part structure, with a distinct second part beginning with chapter 18, and its exegetical method "provide the most striking evidence of its Jewish perspective. It is presented as a talmud or didachē ('teaching') divided into haggadah and halakhah. It uses Philonic allegorical techniques to interpret fragments of Septuagint passages, in the manner of the midrashim. Finally, it applies biblical texts to its own contemporary historical situation in a manner reminiscent of the pesher technique found at Qumran."

The creative interpretation of Bible texts that is most typically found in rabbinic literature and is known as midrash, appears also in the New Testament and other early Christian works, where it is used with the prior assumption that the whole of the Bible relates to Christ.

James L. Bailey judges as correct the classification as midrash of the frequent use by the evangelists of texts from the Hebrew Bible, and Daniel Boyarin applies this in particular to the Prologue (1:1−18) of the Gospel of John. Other instances of New Testament allegorical interpretations of the Old Testament scriptures as foreshadowing Jesus are John 3:14, Galatians 4:21−31 and 1 Peter 3:18−22. Other examples of midrash-like exegesis are found in the accounts of the temptation of Christ in Matthew and Luke, and of circumstances surrounding the birth of Jesus.

Some scholars have evaluated pejoratively the use of scripture, such as by Matthew, as "twisting" its meaning. According to George Wesley Buchanan, however, such condemnations are due to the fact that the scholars have "failed to recognize the meaning and use of midrash", which followed "well-established rules": the authors using midrash were not "objective analysts" but "dogmatic apologists", similar to "twentieth-century lawyers", so it was only natural and understandable that they "took passages out of context and used them to support their unrelated cases".

Similar negative judgments have been expressed on the abundant use of midrash in the Epistle of Barnabas. In 1867, Alexander Roberts and James Donaldson, in their Ante-Nicene Christian Library, disparaged the Epistle for what it called "the absurd and trifling interpretations of Scripture which it suggests".

The Epistle of Barnabas also employs another technique of ancient Jewish exegesis, that of gematria, the ascription of religious significance to the numerical value of letters. When applied to letters of the Greek alphabet, it is also called isopsephia. A well-known New Testament instance of its use is in the Book of Revelation, "Let the one who has understanding calculate the number of the beast, for it is the number of a man, and his number is 666", which is often interpreted as referring to the name "Nero Caesar" written in Hebrew characters. The interpretation of Genesis 17:23–27 in Barnabas 9:7–8 is considered "a classic example" of allegorical or midrashic interpretation: "In reading the story of Abraham circumcising his household, his eye fell on the figure 318 which appeared in the scroll as ΤΙΗ. Now ΙΗ was a familiar contraction of the sacred name of Jesus, and is so written in the Alexandrian papyri of the period; and the letter Τ looked like the cross." The same gematria was adopted by Clement of Alexandria and by several other Church Fathers: William Barclay notes that, because the Greek letter Τ (tau) is shaped exactly like the crux commissa and represented the number 300, "wherever the fathers came across the number 300 in the Old Testament they took it to be a mystical prefiguring of the cross of Christ".

Philip Carrington says: "Barnabas can be artificial, irritating, and censorious; but it would not be fair to judge him by his less fortunate expositions. His interpretation of the unclean beasts and fishes was in line with the thought of his time, being found in the Letter of Aristeas, for instance. His numerology was also a fashionable mode of thought, though the modern scholar is often impatient with it." Robert A. Kraft states that some of the materials used by the final editor "certainly antedate the year 70, and are in some sense 'timeless' traditions of Hellenistic Judaism (e.g., the food law allegories of ch. 10, the Two Ways). It is with such materials that much of the importance of the epistle for our understanding of early Christianity and its late-Jewish heritage rests." The author's style was not a personal foible: in his time it was accepted procedure in general use, although no longer in favour today. Andrew Louth says: "Barnabas seems strange to modern ears: allegory is out of fashion and there is little else in the epistle. But the fashion that outlaws allegory is quite recent, and fashions change."

=== Gnosis ===
In its first chapter, the Epistle states that its intention is that the "sons and daughters" to whom it is addressed should have, along with their faith, perfect knowledge. The knowledge (in Greek, γνῶσις, gnosis) that the first part (chapters 1−17) aims to impart is "an essentially practical γνῶσις, somewhat mystical in character, which seeks to make known the deeper sense of scripture". The first part, of an exclusively exegetical character, provides a spiritual interpretation of scripture.

The second part opens with a declaration (chapter 18:1) that it is turning to "another knowledge" (γνῶσις). This second gnosis is "the knowledge of the will of God, the art of enumerating and specifying his commandments, and applying them to various situations", a halakhic, as opposed to an exegetical, gnosis.

The gnosis of the Epistle of Barnabas does not link it with Gnosticism. It shows "an implicit anti-Gnostic stance": "Barnabas's gnosis can be seen as a precursor of the gnosis of Clement of Alexandria, who distinguished the 'true' gnosis from the 'knowledge falsely so-called' espoused by heretics".

=== Connection to Marcionism ===
Historian Paula Fredriksen situates the Epistle of Barnabas within the competition between proto-orthodox and Marcionite Christians: both rejected Jewish sacrifice, but for opposite theological reasons. In her view, Barnabas's arguments served in part to counter Marcion's dualistic theology, according to which the benevolent God of the Gospel, who sent Jesus into the world as savior, was the true supreme being, distinct from and opposed to the God of the Hebrew Bible, whom Marcion regarded as a malevolent deity.

=== Scriptural quotations ===
Contrary to the views of Helmut Koester and Jay Curry Treat, cited above in relation to the date of composition of the Epistle, the authors of The Comprehensive New Testament say the Epistle of Barnabas quotes from the New Testament gospels twice (4:14, 5:9).

On the other hand, the Epistle abundantly cites the Old Testament in the Septuagint version, including therefore the deuterocanonical books. The Old Testament material appears as allusions and paraphrases as well as explicit quotations. However, the work in no way distinguishes its quotations from sacred scripture from its quotations from other works, some of which are now unknown. While there are agreed upon instances where the Epistle quotes from 1 Enoch, it is not clear whether other material in the Epistle that, though not an exact quotation, resembles 1 Enoch (4:3; 16:5) or 4 Esdras (12:1) attributes to the supposed sources exactly the same status as books now considered canonical. Besides, the Epistle sometimes presents as quotations what are rather free paraphrases, while at other times it gives identifiable phrases without any introductory phrase to indicate that it is quoting.

== Bibliography ==
- L. W. Barnard, "The 'Epistle of Barnabas' and Its Contemporary Setting" In Wolfgang Haase and Hildegard Temporini (eds.), Aufstieg und Niedergang der römischen Welt, . Vol. 27.1, Berlin, Germany, Walter de Gruyter, 1993, pp. 159–207.
- Jonathon Lookadoo, The Epistle of Barnabas: A Commentary, Eugene, Oregon, Cascade, 2022.
