= Sefer Elijah =

Ancient Jewish apocalyptic text

Sefer Elijah (also known as Sefer Eliahu, Sefer Elias, or the Apocalypse of Elijah) is an ancient apocalyptic text which was written in Hebrew to a Jewish audience as early as the 3rd century and as late as the 7th century. This text is presented in a fashion that closely matches the classical definition of the apocalyptic genre as a revelation coming to Elijah from an angelic being about judgment, the coming of a messiah, and the destiny of the Jewish temple and of Jerusalem.

This text is not to be confused with the Coptic Apocalypse of Elijah, which is an early Christian Apocalyptic text. Although the relationship between Sefer Elijah and the Coptic version is still being studied, there are very few similarities and a multitude of stylistic and content differences that suggest the two texts do not share an origin.

The Sefer Elijah was published by Adolf Jellinek in 1855 and Moses Buttenwieser in 1897. Theodor Zahn assigns this apocalypse to the 2nd century AD but other scholars reject such an early date. It is more often dated as early as the 3rd century and as late as the 7th century.
