= Eibert Tigchelaar =

Dutch biblical scholar (born 1959)

Eibert Johannes Calvinus Tigchelaar (born 1959, Sint Anthoniepolder) is a Dutch author considered to be a leading authority on the subject of the Dead Sea Scrolls. Formerly, he held the position of research associate at the Qumran Institute of the University of Groningen and was appointed to a professorship at Florida State University before becoming a research professor at KU Leuven.

== Published books ==
- Tigchelaar, Eibert J. C. (1996). Prophets of Old and the Day of the End: Zechariah, the Book of Watchers, and Apocalyptic. BRILL. ISBN 978-90-04-10356-6.
- The Dead Sea Scrolls: Study Edition - Vol. 1 (Brill Academic Publishers, 1997) ISBN 90-04-10813-0
- The Dead Sea Scrolls Study Edition - Vol. 2 (Brill Academic Publishers, 1998) ISBN 90-04-11059-3
- The Dead Sea Scrolls Study Edition (William B. Eerdman's Publishing, 2000) ISBN 0-8028-4493-6
- To Increase Learning for the Understanding Ones: Reading and Reconstructing the Fragmentary Early Jewish Sapiential Text 4Q (Studies on the Texts of the Desert of Judah) (Brill Academic Publishers, 2002) ISBN 90-04-11678-8

== Other publications ==
- Kennis van het Kwaad. Zeven visies uit jodendom en christendom. Zoetermeer: Meinema, 2004.
- Sodom’s Sin. Genesis 18-19 and its Interpretations. Themes in Biblical Narrative 7. Leiden and Boston: Brill, 2004.
- Fragmenten uit de woestijn. De Dode-Zeerollen opnieuw bekeken. Zoetermeer: Meinema, 2003.
- The Sacrifice of Isaac. The Aqedah (Genesis 22) and Its Interpretations. Themes in Biblical Narrative 4. Leiden, Boston and Köln: Brill, 2002.
- To Increase Learning for the Understanding Ones. Reading and Reconstructing the Fragmentary Early Jewish Sapiential Text 4QInstruction . Studies on the Texts of the Desert of Judah 44. Leiden, Boston and Köln: Brill, 2001.
- Discoveries in the Judaean Desert XXIII: Qumran Cave 11 II, 11Q2-18, 11Q20-31 Incorporating Earlier Editions by J.P.M. van der Ploeg, O.P. with a Contribution by Edward Herbert. Oxford: Clarendon Press, 1998.
