= Herwig Maehler =

German historian and papyrologist (1935–2021)

Herwig Maehler, FBA (29 April 1935 – 29 October 2021) was a German historian and papyrologist, who specialized in classics and ancient history.

== Biography ==
He completed his PhD at the University of Hamburg in 1961. In 1975, he completed his Habilitation in classics from the Free University of Berlin.

He subsequently worked as a curator of Greek papyri at Egyptian Museum of Berlin. Afterwards he was Professor of Papyrology at University College London.

== Awards ==
He was a fellow of the British Academy.

== Bibliography ==
Some of his books are:

- The Vienna Epigrams Papyrus
- Pindari Carmina cvm Fragmentis: Pars II: Fragmenta. Indices
- Die Lieder des Bakchylides
- Schrift, Text Und Bild: Kleine Schriften Von Herwig Maehler
- Urkunden Aus Hermupolis
- Die Auffassung des Dichterberufs im fruhen Griechentum bis zur Zeit Pindars
- Urkunden römischer Zeit
