= Stichometry of Nicephorus =

Stichometry by Patriarch Nicerphorus

The Stichometry of Nicephorus is a stichometry attributed to Patriarch Nicephorus I of Constantinople (c. 758-828). The work appears at the end of the Chronographikon Syntomon. It consists of a list of New Testament and Old Testament works categorized between canonical, disputed, and apocryphal, along with the total number of lines in each text. The work was composed in the 9th century. Some manuscripts attribute the work anonymously rather than to Nicephorus. It is significant in the area of canon studies as it includes counts for Christian texts which have been lost over the course of time. This has enabled modern scholars to determine how much of various fragmentary texts from the New Testament apocrypha and Old Testament apocrypha remain missing.

Among the books whose canonicity is listed as disputed in the text are three of the Books of Maccabees, the Book of Wisdom, the Book of Sirach, the Book of Esther, the Book of Judith, the Book of Tobit, and the Book of Revelation.

== Disputed texts in the New Testament ==
The New Testament writings considered disputed:

- Revelation of John
- Apocalypse of Peter
- Epistle of Barnabas
- Gospel of the Hebrews

== Disputed texts in the Old Testament ==
The Old Testament writings considered disputed:

- 3 books of Maccabees
- Wisdom of Solomon
- Wisdom of Ben Sirach
- Psalms and Songs of Solomon
- Esther
- Judith
- Tobit who is Tobias
