= Descent of Mary =

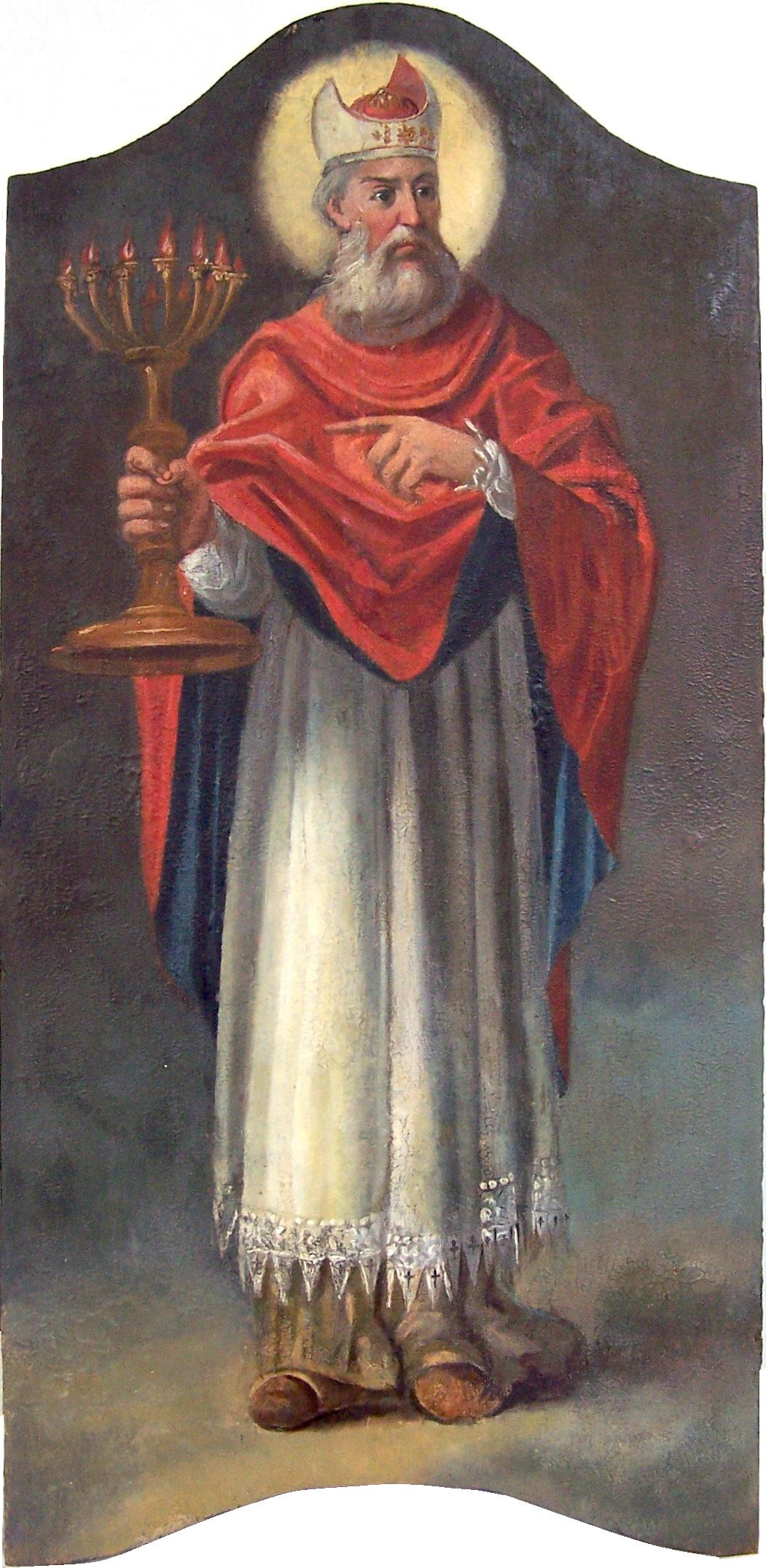
Zechariah is mentioned in Descent of Mary

The Descent of Mary (Γεννα Μαριας or "Genna Marias", sometimes the birth or offspring of Mary) is a second century work of the New Testament apocrypha which is known through mention in the Panarion. Epiphanius attributes the tale to the Gnostics.

The Phibionite story tells of the death of Zechariah, who is supposed to have seen a vision of a man "in the form of an ass" while burning incense in the temple. When he emerges, he is unable to speak at first, but when he is able to relate the vision, those about him kill him. The story is consonant with other Gnostic writings and depiction of Gnostic thought in the writings of Origen, as well as with the Gospel of James; but there is no other testimony to this particular tale. The depiction of the Jewish deity as a donkey god however depends on a "much older" Egyptian tradition.

== See also ==
- Phibionites
