= Presentation of Mary =

Liturgical feast

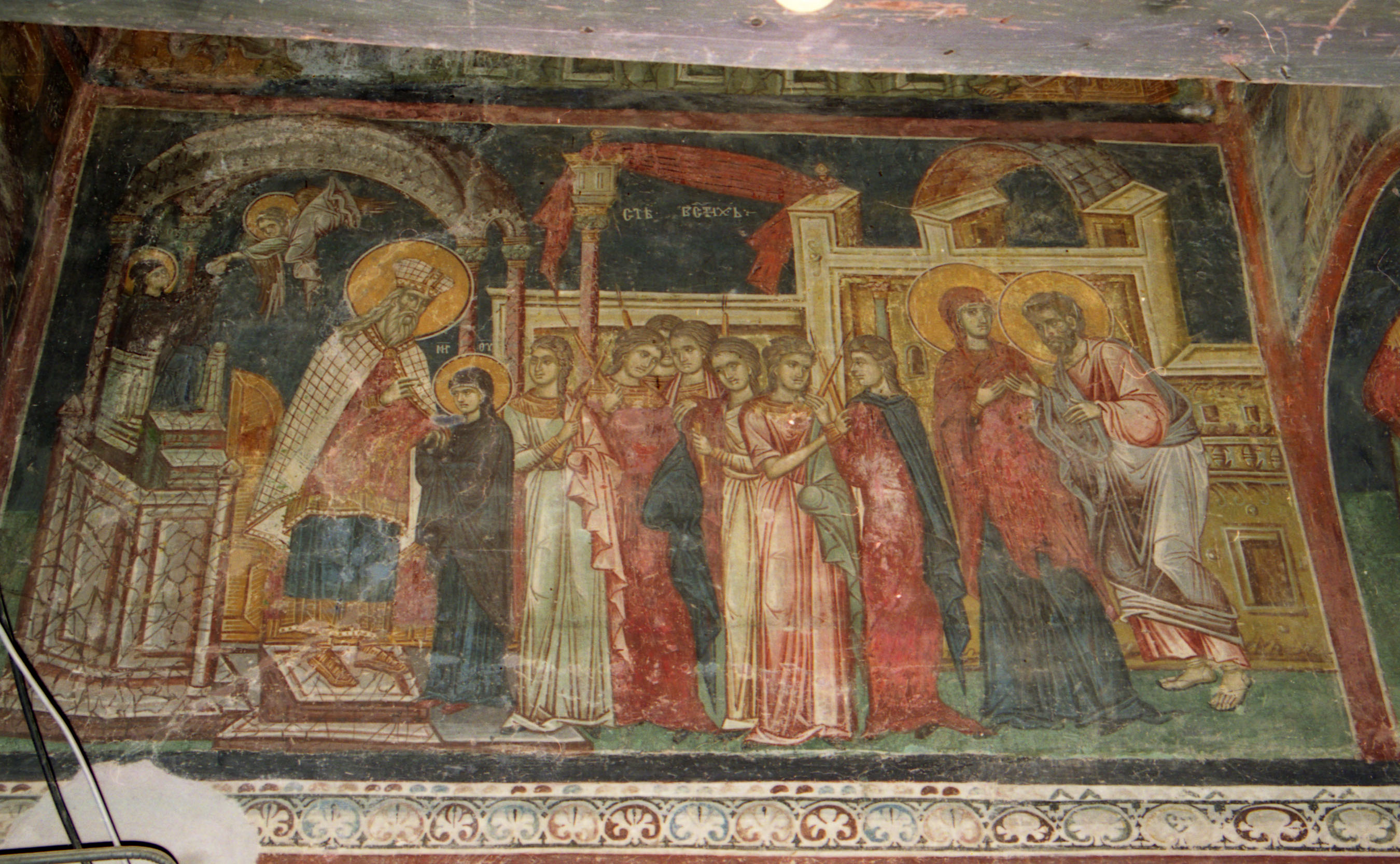
Fresco from the Serbian Orthodox Church of the Presentation of the Virgin Mary in Kučevište near Skopje

The Presentation of the Blessed Virgin Mary, known in the East as The Entry of the Most Holy Theotokos into the Temple, is a liturgical feast celebrated on November 21 by the Catholic, Eastern Orthodox, and some Anglo-Catholic Churches.

The feast is associated with an event recounted not in the New Testament, but in the apocryphal Protoevangelium of James. According to that text, Mary's parents, Joachim and Anne, who had been childless, received a heavenly message that they would have a child. In thanksgiving for the gift of their daughter, they brought her, when still a child, to the Temple in Jerusalem to consecrate her to God. Later versions of the story (such as the Gospel of Pseudo-Matthew and the Gospel of the Nativity of Mary) indicate that Mary was taken to the Temple at around the age of three in fulfillment of a vow. Tradition held that she was to remain there to be educated in preparation for her role as Mother of God.

== Story ==
The account of the Presentation of the Blessed Virgin Mary in the Temple is principally based on the Protoevangelium of James, which has been dated by historians prior to the year 200 AD. The story relates that in thanksgiving for the birth of their daughter Mary, Joachim and Anne decide to consecrate her to God, and bring her, at the age of three years, to the temple in Jerusalem. Mary's presentation in the temple draws parallels to that of the prophet Samuel, whose mother Hannah, like Anne, was also thought to be barren, and who offered her child as a gift to God at Shiloh.

Mary remained in the Temple until her twelfth year, at which point Joseph was assigned to be her guardian. According to Coptic tradition, her father Joachim died when Mary was six years old and her mother when Mary was eight.

== Feast day ==
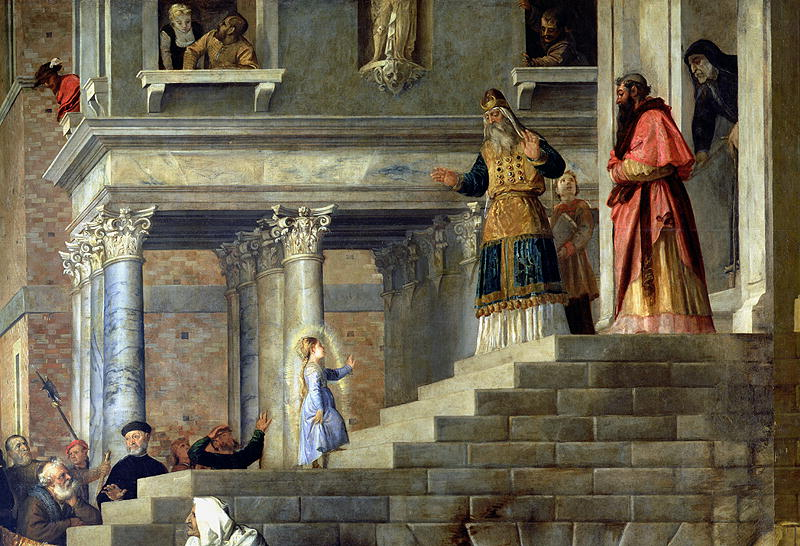
Detail from The Presentation of the Virgin Mary by Titian (1534–1538, Gallerie dell'Accademia, Venice)

The feast originated as a result of the dedication of the New Church of the Theotokos, built in 543 by the Byzantines under Emperor Justinian I near the site of the ruined Temple in Jerusalem. This basilica was destroyed by the Sasanian Persians under Khosrow II after the Siege of Jerusalem (614). The first documented celebration of the feast in any calendar is the mention of the Εἴσοδος τῆς Παναγίας Θεοτόκου (Entry of the All-Holy Theotokos, i.e., into the Temple) in the Menologion of Basil II, an 11th-century menology of the Eastern Roman (also known as Byzantine) emperor Basil II.

The feast continued to be celebrated throughout the East, was celebrated in the monasteries of Southern Italy by the ninth century, and was introduced into the Papal Chapel in Avignon in 1372 by decree of Pope Gregory XI. The feast was included in the Roman Missal in 1472, but was suppressed by Pope Pius V in 1568. As a result, it did not appear in the Tridentine calendar. Pope Sixtus V reintroduced it into the Roman calendar in 1585. Pope Clement VIII made this feast a greater double in 1597. The feast also continued as a memorial in the Roman calendar of 1969.

== Liturgical celebration ==
The Eastern Orthodox Church celebrates it on November 21 as one of its twelve Great Feasts. For those churches which follow the Julian calendar, November 21 falls on December 4 of the modern Gregorian calendar. In the Orthodox Church the feast always falls during the Nativity Fast, and on the day of the feast the fasting rules are lessened somewhat so that fish, wine, and oil may be eaten.

For the Roman Catholic Church, on the day of the Presentation of the Blessed Virgin Mary, "we celebrate that dedication of herself which Mary made to God from her very childhood under the inspiration of the Holy Spirit who filled her with grace ... ." In the 1974 apostolic exhortation Marialis Cultus, Pope Paul VI wrote "There are still other [commemorations] which, apart from their apocryphal content present lofty and exemplary value and carry on venerable traditions having their origin especially in the East..."

The three feasts of the Birthday of Our Lady, the Holy Name of Mary, and her Presentation in the Temple correspond in the Marian cycle with the first three feasts of the cycle of feasts of Jesus: namely, Christmas, the Holy Name of Jesus, and His Presentation at the Temple. November 21 is also a "Pro Orantibus" Day, a day of prayer for cloistered religious "totally dedicated to God in prayer, silence, and concealment".

== Legacy ==
During the World Youth Day in July 2016, Pope Francis paid a private morning visit to the Convent of the Sisters of the Presentation (lat. Congregatio Virginum a Praesentatione Beatae Mariae Virginis), founded in 1627 in Kraków as the first Polish active Religious institute.

St. Peter's Basilica contains the Cappella della Presentazione (Presentation Chapel); the altar is dedicated to St. Pius X.

The Presentation of the Virgin Mary Orthodox Monastery was located in Marshfield, Missouri, before the nuns relocated to Holy Archangel Michael and All Angels Skete in Weatherby, Missouri.

The Presentation Sisters, also known as the Sisters of the Presentation of the Blessed Virgin Mary (PBVM for short), a religious institute of Roman Catholic women, was founded in Cork, Ireland, by Honora (Nano) Nagle in 1775.

The congregation of the Sisters of the Presentation of Mary, dedicated to the education of youth, was founded November 21, 1796, in Thueyts, France, by Anne-Marie Rivier.

The Sisters of Mary of the Presentation is a Catholic religious institute founded in 1828 in Broons, France, known for schools and hospitals in Europe, Africa, and North America.

== In art ==
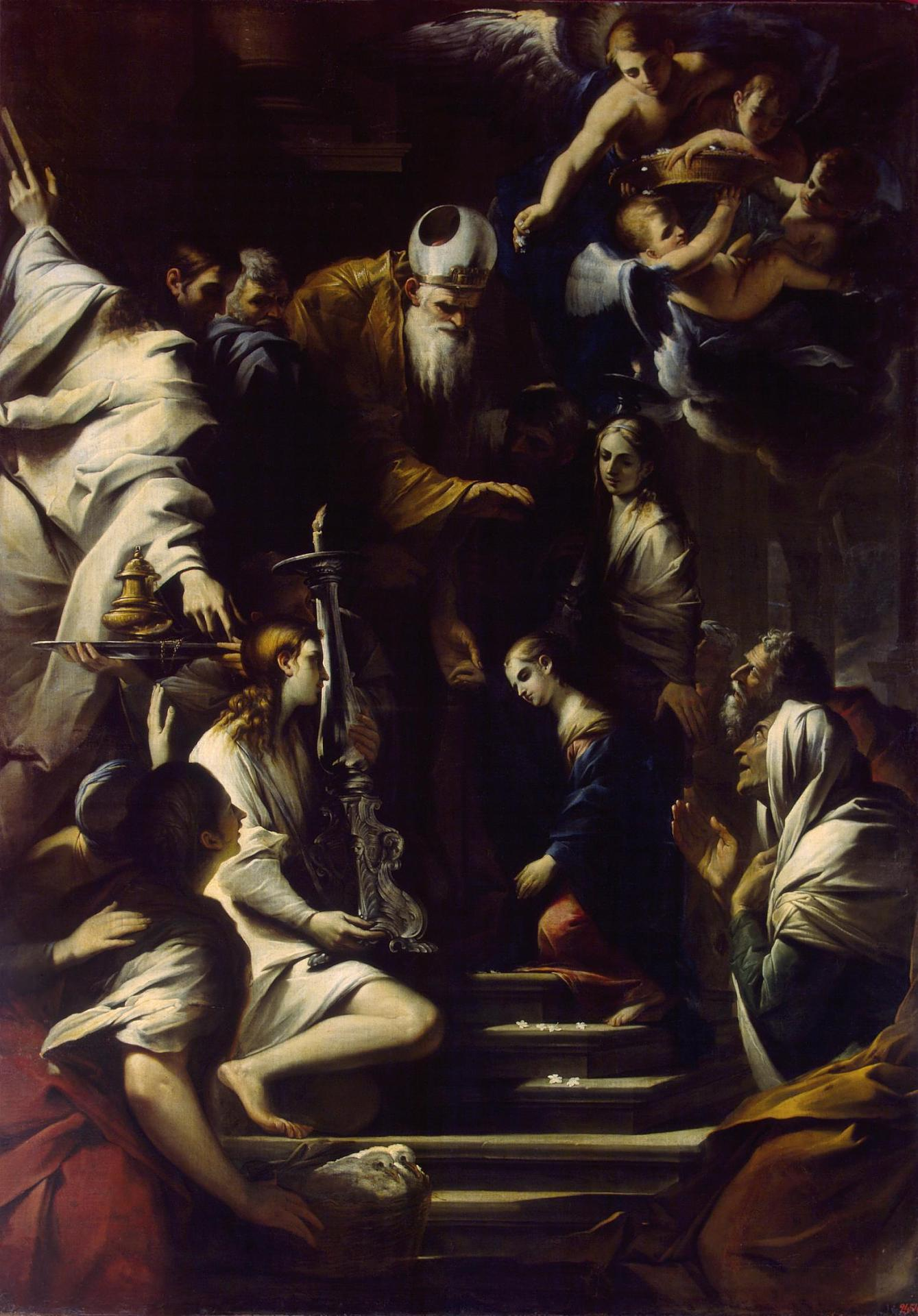
Presentation of the Virgin in the Temple, Testa

Western depictions of the subject usually focus on the lone figure of the child Mary climbing the steep steps of the Temple. Having left her parents at the bottom, she is to be received by the High Priest and other Temple officials waiting at the top of the steps. Orthodox images of the event may include a procession of virgins headed by Mary.

The Presentation is one of the usual scenes in larger cycles of the Life of the Virgin, although it is not usually one of the scenes shown in a Book of Hours. One of the most important illustrations of this event is Pietro Testa's famous painting.

== See also ==
- Presentation Sisters
- Presentation Brothers
- Presentation of Jesus
