= Armenian Infancy Gospel =

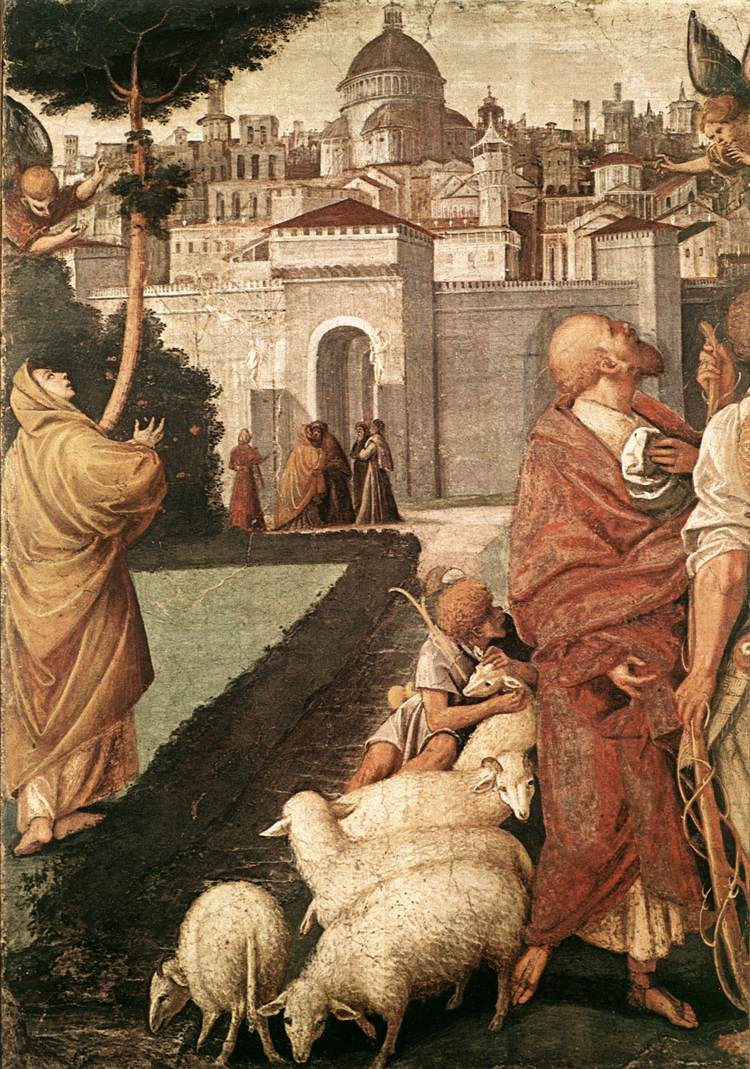
- Annunciation to Joachim and Anna

Information
- Religion: Christianity
- Author: Unknown
- Language: Armenian
- Period: 6th century

The Armenian Infancy Gospel (or the Armenian Gospel of the Infancy) is a sixth-century apocryphal infancy gospel based on an older Syriac version which no longer exists. The gospel has two versions, a longer one (37 chapters) and a shorter one (28 chapters). The text includes stories about Virgin Mary's life, her marriage to Joseph, her miraculous birth to Jesus, Jesus's childhood and his later life like the other infancy gospels but with some distinct features.

== Sources ==
According to an Armenian source, apocryphal texts, which include The Infancy of the Lord, were brought to Armenia by missionaries in 590 AD. The earliest known usage of this gospel was by the Armenian philosopher, Anania Shirakatsi. The Armenian syntax of the document seems to have a Semitic basis, which suggest that the document most likely is an Armenian translation of a now lost Syriac text.

== Influence from other Infancy Gospels ==
The Armenian Infancy Gospel is influenced mostly by the Protevangelium of James as well as other infancy gospels such as the Infancy Gospel of Thomas and the Gospel of Pseudo-Matthew. Due to this factor, Frederick Conybeare mistakenly thought the gospel to be the Protevangelium of James when he published the first six chapters in the late 19th century.

== See also ==
- Protevangelium of James
- Infancy Gospels
- Infancy Gospel of Thomas
- Gospel of Pseudo-Matthew
- New Testament Apocrypha
