= Gospel of Pseudo-Matthew =

New Testament apocrypha

While fleeing to Egypt, young Jesus orders a palm tree to offer its fruit to a hungry Mary

The Gospel of Pseudo-Matthew is a gospel about the childhood of Jesus classified as part of New Testament apocrypha. Pseudo-Matthew is part of the genre of infancy gospels that seek to expand and fill out details on the Holy Family, the nativity of Jesus, and Jesus's childhood. The work was among the most popular apocryphal writings in the Middle Ages in the Western, Latin-speaking Christian Church, along with the Gospel of Nicodemus. The work was written in Latin, but was translated to many vernacular languages across Europe in a variety of forms in the Late Middle Ages. Portions of it were used in Jacob of Voragine's Golden Legend, an enormously popular collection of saint hagiographies in the late Middle Ages. In the West, it was the dominant source for pictorial cycles of the Life of Mary.

The work changed and expanded over time in an era where manuscripts were hand-copied. Much of the core of the work is an adaptation of the Gospel of James, a Greek infancy gospel that was condemned in the 5th–6th centuries; Pseudo-Matthew keeps much of James, but slightly modified sections that caused theological controversy. To this it adds an account of the Flight into Egypt, although the sources for this are unclear. Later editions added other material, notably including much of the Infancy Gospel of Thomas, as well as other traditions on the young Jesus familiar to wherever the manuscript was being copied, explaining the wide variation in contents. It was a successful attempt to merge these texts into a single work. Some manuscripts include a preface which pseudepigraphically claims that the work was a translation by Saint Jerome of a Hebrew work from Matthew the Evangelist into Latin, although the gospel was created centuries after Jerome's life.

As the work had many forms, it was known under a variety of titles. Some include Natiuitas sanctae Mariae ("Nativity of Saint Mary"), sometimes including uirginis ("virgin"), incipit ("beginning"), historia ("history"), and/or atque infantiam Iesu Christi ("and the infancy of Jesus Christ"). By the later Middle Ages, the larger form including the Thomas material was sometimes known as Liber de Infantia Salvatoris ("Book of the Infancy of the Savior"), as in William Caxton's printed edition. It was not known as the Gospel of Pseudo-Matthew in the Middle Ages; this is a term from centuries after the work's prominence. The Pseudo-Matthew title was coined in Constantin von Tischendorf's influential 1853 book Evangelia Apocrypha, which collected manuscripts of apocrypha. Tischendorf thought on the evidence available to him that the attribution to Matthew and Jerome was original to the text, although later scholarship has shown that the earliest versions do not include this prologue.

== Authorship and composition date ==
A prologue of a forged correspondence between Saint Jerome and two bishops in a 9th-century manuscript

Neither the author nor the place of composition are known, leaving the origins of Pseudo-Matthew mysterious. It is thought that the creator was more of a compiler and editor of existing stories, rather than someone writing original material.

Surviving manuscripts of the Gospel of Pseudo-Matthew date from the 9th century to the 16th century. However, scholars believe the gospel was authored earlier than the 9th century. According to Jan Gijsel and Rita Beyers, the archetype of the Gospel of Pseudo-Matthew's Recension A dates to 800 AD, and the original composition date might be in the first half of the seventh century, around 600 to 625 AD. They suggest that the author might have been a monk who admired the Gospel of James, and refashioned it to emphasize Mary as living the ideal life a monk or nun might aspire to. Gijsel writes that Joachim's representation in Pseudo-Matthew is meant to evoke the model figure of a Merovingian nobleman, and believes it is consistent with praise of Dagobert I who reigned from 629–639 AD. According to Michael Berthold, the composition date of the Gospel of Pseudo-Matthew is around 650 AD at the earliest, due to the fact that it "shows literary dependence on Vita Agnetis of Pseudo-Ambrose", which itself was used in De Virginitate by Aldhelm in 690 AD. According to Gerhard Schneider, the Gospel of Pseudo-Matthew was composed in the 8th or 9th century during the Carolingian dynasty. Brandon Hawk suggests that the broadest range of possibilities is from 550–800 AD, with the work showing familiarity with the 6th century Rule of Saint Benedict, but agrees with Gijsel that the 7th century is the most likely.

The work expanded over time. The base content of Pseudo-Matthew shares many similarities with, and likely used as a source, the apocryphal Gospel of James. The attribution of the work to Matthew was not present in the earliest versions; the claim Matthew wrote the gospel was only added two centuries later, in the prologue correspondence between the bishops and Jerome. The similar Gospel of James had been condemned in Western Christianity by Jerome due to its reference to Jesus having brothers; seemingly in an attempt to avoid a similar condemnation, the prologue was added wherein an authority no less than Jerome himself translates the work from Matthew and approves of it. Similarly, the later sections which include a version of the Infancy Gospel of Thomas are not present in the oldest manuscripts, suggesting that the merging of the Gospel of Thomas content into the combined Pseudo-Matthew work happened later.

== Content ==
=== Prefaces ===
The narrative in its best-known form is prefaced by a series of letters between the early Church father Jerome and the Bishops Comatius and Heliodorus. In these letters the bishops request that Jerome translate a "Hebrew volume, written by the hand of the most blessed Evangelist Matthew," concerning the birth of the virgin mother and the infancy of Jesus. Though the work is attributed to Jerome, it is impossible that St. Jerome actually wrote or translated it: "no one who is acquainted with the style of Jerome's letters will think this one authentic."

The author of the pseudo-Jerome letter claims Jerome compiled and translated the work, taking care to "render it word for word, exactly as it is in the Hebrew, since it is asserted that it was composed by the holy Evangelist Matthew, and written at the head of his Gospel," though the letter acknowledges doubts as to their authenticity.

The oldest forms of the work include a prologue closer to the Gospel of James where the writer pseudepigraphically claimed to be James, the brother of Jesus, instead. The apocryphal letters wherein Jerome approves of the work were added two centuries later, but apparently aided the popularity of the work by avoiding any condemnations of gospels attributed to James.

=== Joseph and Mary's origins and family ===
The first half of the narrative tells the story of St. Joachim and St. Anne, the parents of Mary; Joachim's sorrow and persecution on account of their lack of progeny, his exile and return to Anna with child, and the birth of Mary. Mary enters service as a temple virgin, lives a prayerful life and makes a vow of chastity. After she becomes too old to continue as a temple virgin, she chooses Joseph as her husband and guardian. The Annunciation of Jesus's birth is given; Joseph is distress at finding his wife pregnant, but eventually accepts her honesty. He and Mary are tested in the temple, and people there are convinced of Mary's and Joseph's innocence and that they had not broken vows of virginity.

=== Flight to Egypt ===
While in Egypt, various animals and dragons pay obeisance to young Jesus

During the Flight to Egypt, the young Jesus performs many miracles, including taming dragons, lions, and leopards; making a palm tree deliver its fruit to his mother Mary; and causing pagan idols to bow down and worship him.

=== Jesus's childhood ===
This section is an edited version of the Infancy Gospel of Thomas and covers Jesus's childhood from age 5 to 12. Tischendorf called it the Pars altera, the "other part".

== Relationship with other works ==
=== The Bible ===
The Gospel of Matthew and Gospel of Luke were canonized in the New Testament and provided the core of the details Christians knew of the nativity of Jesus. As the literary goal of infancy gospels was generally to expand the nativity stories and fill in missing details, much of the work goes beyond what is presented in the canonical gospels, but Pseudo-Matthew does reference characters and elements from Matthew and Luke.

Pseudo-Matthew includes reference and allusion to other parts of the Bible as well, such as in referencing parts of the Old Testament to interpret them as prophecies which are fulfilled by stories in the work. Others are parallel stories; the depiction of Joachim and Anna bears resemblances with the story of Abraham and Sarah.

Biblical references can vary somewhat by recension. The older "A" family seems to use references to the Vetus Latina "Old Latin" translation of the Bible, which remained in use in some regions in the early Middle Ages, while the later P, Q, and R recensions make reference to Jerome's Vulgate translation.

=== Gospel of James ===
The Gospel of James (not to be confused with the unrelated Epistle of James) is the most important source for Pseudo-Matthew, but it is not adapted entirely. In particular, the compiler either left out or did not have access to some of the later chapters after 20. Some omissions include Joseph recounting how time stood still upon Jesus's birth in chapter 18 (the "catalepsys of nature"); as well as the entire final section of the story. This includes a story on how Elizabeth, mother of John the Baptist (22-23), depicted as Mary's cousin, was divinely protected; and the conflict between John's father Zechariah and King Herod (23-24) that resulted in Zechariah's murder.

=== Nativity of Mary ===
The Nativity of Mary (De Nativitate Mariae) is an edited version of the early parts of Pseudo-Matthew; some manuscripts include the prologue dialogue that claims to be between Jerome and the two bishops as well. It focuses on the birth of Mary and her life up to the Annunciation. It was probably composed in the 10th century, but surviving evidence of it only begins in the 11th century. It, too, was popular; over 150 manuscripts of it have been found, and it had various printed editions. Reading the text became associated with the feast of the Nativity of Mary on September 8 in medieval Western Christianity.

The Nativity of Mary seems to have appealed more to clerics interested in Mariology but who preferred a more refined and sober work. Points of drama and tension in Pseudo-Matthew are removed; Mary and her parents are emphasized as being submissive to divine will.

=== Other infancy gospels ===
Pagan idols fall to their knees and worship young Jesus. From a 13th-century illustrated manuscript of the Gospel of Pseudo-Matthew.

The Gelasian Decree, a 6th-century document from France but that may have been based on earlier lists, includes a list of condemned works not to be read (and thus implying that people at the time were reading them, hence the condemnation). These include Evangelium nomine Iacobi minoris, Liber de infantia Salvatoris, Liber de nativitate Salvatoris et de Maria vel obstetrice, and Liber qui appellatur Transitus sanctae Mariae. The first of these seems to be the Gospel of James; the second the Infancy Gospel of Thomas (then more likely known as some variant of The Childhood Deeds of Jesus). The third is more mysterious, a lost work titled "Book on the Birth of the Savior and on Mary and the Midwife". It may have served as a source used in compilation of an Irish-Latin text known as the Book of the Nativity of the Savior related to Pseudo-Matthew, although its contents are not known for sure.

The story of pagan idols falling down on their knees to worship before Jesus is seen in several other sources, although which originated the idea and which were derivative is not entirely clear, or if a lost common source is involved. It is seen in the Legend of Aphroditian, the Arabic Infancy Gospel (which, despite its name, may have originated from Syriac), and the Armenian Infancy Gospel.

== Influence ==
The work had a strong influence in medieval thought, partly due to the inclusion of many excerpts in the commonly read Golden Legend. The Gospel adds the first known mention of an ox and a donkey being present at the nativity of Jesus, and depicts the animals as a reference to Isaiah 1:3. The work also helped popularize the image of a very young Mary and relatively old Joseph from the Gospel of James.

Events described in the Gospel of Pseudo-Matthew inspired "The Cherry-Tree Carol", an English ballad.

== Manuscripts and printed editions ==
Jan Gijsel and Rita Beyers cataloged 197 surviving handwritten manuscripts including Pseudo-Matthew, and classified them into a number of recensions. The vast bulk of the manuscripts are classified into four major families: A, P, Q, and R. A is generally thought to represent the oldest form of the text, although it usually includes the Jerome letters to the bishops, which is not thought to be the oldest. The P family includes the "Ego Iacobus" prologue which is an adapted form of the epilogue to the Gospel of James.

With the printing press, it became easier to reliably make copies. Some excerpts of Pseudo-Matthew are in Giovanni Andrea Bussi's 1468 compilation of Jerome's letters. William Caxton printed an edition of Pseudo-Matthew that omitted the sections detailing Joachim & Anna's lives in 1477 but including the nativity, flight to Egypt, Gospel of Thomas, and various other material, calling it Infantia salvatoris. Johann Karl Thilo made a printing in 1832, but as part of a scholarly collection of apocrypha (rather than Caxton printing the work for the wider public as a genuine tale). The most significant printing was in Constantin von Tischendorf's 1853 book Evangelia Apocrypha (and its 1873 2nd edition). Tischendorf consulted additional manuscripts that Thilo did not have access to, and gave the work its modern name of "Gospel of Pseudo-Matthew".

== Rebellion of Dimas ==
There is a story found only in a single Latin manuscript of the Gospel of Pseudo-Matthew, called the Rebellion of Dimas. It provides a backstory for the penitent thief (or "good thief") described in Luke's version of the crucifixion. The manuscript is found in the Grand Séminaire of Namur, Belgium, and was created in the 12th century. The story probably originates from France, was originally written in Latin, and was created in the 12th century (matching the manuscript). The addition was well known enough in Northern France for it to be included in a 14th-century collection of legends of the "good thief" compiled by Jean d'Outremeuse.

In the story, Dimas is of noble blood and the son of Judean procurator. He and his father are assigned to guard the region around Bethlehem during the Massacre of the Innocents and stop any infants from escaping. Dimas intercepts Joseph, Mary, and the baby Jesus, but Joseph cleverly tells Dimas that he should be looking for a royal infant, not a poor family. Dimas lets the Holy Family escape; his father disowns him after his 'failure', and he is forced into a life of banditry. Much later, he is captured, and is tortured together with Jesus during the crucifixion before ultimately joining him in heaven.

== Relation to the Quran ==
The Qur'anic birth narrative closely resembles ones found in Christian apocryphal texts, which some modern scholars consider the Qur'anic account to have possibly been dependent on. The primary two accounts the Qu'ran is thought to recount in some way are found in the Gospel of Pseudo-Matthew which features the aforementioned Marian date-palm (and spring) miracle in Egypt and the Gospel of James which features a remote/cave birth narrative. Of additional importance are also the pictorial mosaics found in the Church of the Seat of Mary, which was converted into a mosque and served as the primary architectural inspiration for the Dome of the Rock. These mosaics already display the narrative conflation between the remote birth and the date-palm episode found in the Qu'ran, though the Qur'anic account of the date-palm narrative predates Pseudo-Matthew. They thereby likely attest the Palestinian oral tradition recounted by the author of the Qu'ran.

== Translations ==
Selected English translations of the Gospel of Pseudo-Matthew can be found in:

- Cowper, Benjamin. H. (1874) [1867]. The Apocryphal Gospels and other documents relating to the History of Christ . Frederic Norgate. pp. 27–83 – via Wikisource.
- Ehrman, Bart; Pleše, Zlatko (2011). The Apocryphal Gospels: Texts and Translations. Oxford University Press. pp. 73–113. ISBN 978-0-19-973210-4.
- Hawk, Brandon W. (2019). The Gospel of Pseudo-Matthew and the Nativity of Mary. Westar Tools and Translations 8. Cascade Books. ISBN 978-1-5326-3715-5.

== See also ==
- List of Gospels

== Bibliography ==
- Dzon, Mary (2017). The Quest for the Christ Child in the Later Middle Ages. Middle Ages Series. University of Pennsylvania Press. ISBN 978-0812293708.
- Gijsel, Jan (1997). Beyers, Rita (ed.). Libri de Nativitate Mariae: Pseudo-Matthaei Evangelium. Corpus Christianorum Series Apocryphorum 9 (in French). Brepols. ISBN 978-2-503-41091-3.
- Hawk, Brandon W. (2019). The Gospel of Pseudo-Matthew and the Nativity of Mary. Westar Tools and Translations 8. Cascade Books. ISBN 978-1-5326-3715-5.
