= Apostolorum =

Apostolorum may refer to:

- Ad Apostolorum principis (June 29, 1958) is an encyclical of Pope Pius XII on Communism and the Church in China.
- Memoria Apostolorum, which means (in) memory of the apostles, is one of the lost texts from the New Testament apocrypha.
- Ad beatissimi Apostolorum is an encyclical of Pope Benedict XV given at St. Peter's, Rome, on the Feast of All Saints on November 1, 1914, in the first year of his Pontificate.
- Didascalia Apostolorum (or just Didascalia) is the title of a treatise which presents itself as being written by the Apostles at the time of the Council of Jerusalem.
- Dispersion of the Apostles (Lat. Divisio Apostolorum), a feast in commemoration of the missionary work of the Twelve Apostles.
- The Epistula Apostolorum (Latin for Letter of the Apostles) is a work from the New Testament apocrypha.
