= Life of John the Baptist =

New Testament apocrypha

The Life of John the Baptist is a book from the New Testament apocrypha, purported to be written by Serapion, Bishop of Thmuis in 390 AD. While its author claims to be a Coptic priest, the only surviving manuscripts are written in Garšūnī, i.e. Arabic language in Syriac script. The narrative of the text is an expanded biography of the biblical John the Baptist, drawing upon earlier sources in the Gospel of Luke and the Gospel of James.

== Contents ==
Tony Burke, Associate Professor of Early Christianity, at York University describes the vita as:

begins with a harmony of details about John’s birth taken from the Gospel of Luke and the Infancy Gospel of James, finishing with the death of Zechariah and Elizabeth fleeing from Herod’s soldiers into the desert. After five years, when John is seven years and six months old, Elizabeth dies, portentously on the same day as Herod the Great. Jesus, “whose eyes sees heaven and earth” (7:3), sees John grieving and spirits himself and Mary to the desert on a cloud. They bury Elizabeth and then Jesus and Mary remain with John for seven days, teaching him how to live in the desert. Then Mary and Jesus return to Nazareth, leaving John under the protection of Gabriel and watched by the souls of his parents. The text then shifts to John’s adult career and the story of Herod Antipas and his affair with Philip’s wife Herodias.
