= Infancy gospels =

Genre of religious texts

Infancy gospels are a genre of religious texts that arose in the 2nd century. They are part of New Testament apocrypha, and provide accounts of the birth and early life of Jesus. The texts are of various and uncertain origin, and are generally non-canonical in major modern branches of Christianity. They include the Gospel of James, which introduces the concept of the Perpetual Virginity of Mary, and the Infancy Gospel of Thomas (not to be confused with the unrelated Gospel of Thomas), both of which cover many miraculous incidents from the life of Mary and the childhood of Jesus that are not included in the canonical gospels. Although the Life of John the Baptist focuses on John the Baptist rather than Jesus or his immediate family, it is also included in the genre as its events would be contemporary with Jesus's early life.

== Gospel of James ==
The Gospel of James, also known as the Protoevangelium of James, and the Infancy Gospel of James, is an apocryphal gospel most likely written around the year 145 AD, expanding the infancy stories contained in the Gospels of Matthew and Luke. It also presents a narrative concerning the birth and upbringing of Mary herself. It is the oldest source to mention the virginity of Mary not only prior to, but during (and after) the birth of Jesus. The ancient manuscripts that preserve the book have different titles, including "The Birth of Mary", "The Story of the Birth of Saint Mary, Mother of God", and "The Birth of Mary; The Revelation of James". It is also referred to as "Genesis of Mary".

== Infancy Gospel of Thomas ==
The Infancy Gospel of Thomas is a biographical gospel about the childhood of Jesus, believed to date to the second century. It is more of a group of texts, rather than a single standardized form, as the story grew and was combined with others over time. The title itself is something of a misnomer, as only some versions include an attribution to "Thomas the Israelite", and this inclusion appears to have happened centuries after its creation. From the 18th century to the 1950s it was primarily referred to as the "Gospel of Thomas", but "Infancy Gospel" was added to distinguish it from the Gnostic Gospel of Thomas discovered at Nag Hammadi.

Although non-canonical in mainstream Christianity, the Infancy Gospel of Thomas contains many miracles and stories of Jesus that spread far and wide. A story of Jesus giving life to clay birds is referenced in the Quran in the surah The Family of Imran, for example.

== Gospel of Pseudo-Matthew ==
The Gospel of Pseudo-Matthew is a part of the New Testament apocrypha, and was an important source for establishing details of the life of Mary, especially before the Late Middle Ages. According to the research of J. Gijsel / R. Beyers (1997) the archetype of the Gospel of Pseudo-Matthew Recensio-α dates to 800 AD and the composition dates to the first half of the seventh century, maybe to around 600 and 625 AD. Gijsel furthermore points out that Joachim's representation in Pseudo-Matthew is meant to evoke the model figure of a Merovingian nobleman, this one, according to Gijsel, being Dagobert I during his reign (629–639). According to Berthold, the composition date of the Gospel of Pseudo-Matthew was circa 650 AD at the earliest, due to the fact that it "shows literary dependence on Vita Agnetis of Pseudo-Ambrose", which itself was used in De Virginitate in 690 AD. According to G. Schneider, the Gospel of Pseudo-Matthew was composed in the 8th or 9th century during the Carolingian dynasty. Pseudo-Matthew shares many similarities with, and likely used as sources, the apocryphal Gospel of James and Infancy Gospel of Thomas.

== Arabic Infancy Gospel ==
The Arabic Infancy Gospel, also known as the Syriac Infancy Gospel, is a New Testament apocryphal writing concerning the infancy of Jesus. It may have been compiled as early as the sixth century, and was partly based on the Infancy Gospel of Thomas, and Protevangelium of James. There are only two surviving manuscripts dating from 1299 AD and the 15th/16th century in Arabic.

== History of Joseph the Carpenter ==
The History of Joseph the Carpenter (Historia Josephi Fabri Lignari) is a compilation of traditions concerning Mary, Joseph, and the Holy Family, probably composed in Byzantine Egypt in Greek in the late sixth or early seventh centuries, but surviving only in Coptic and Arabic language translations. The text bears witness to the belief in the perpetual virginity of Mary.

It is one of the texts within the New Testament apocrypha concerned with the period of Jesus' life before he was 12.

== The Life of John the Baptist ==
The Life of John the Baptist is a book from the New Testament apocrypha, allegedly written in Greek by Serapion, Bishop of Thmuis in 390 AD. The text is an expanded biography of the biblical John the Baptist. While it does not focus primarily on the life of Jesus, it is considered an infancy gospel due to its focus on events that would have occurred around the same time as Jesus's childhood.
