= New Testament apocrypha =

Writings by early Christians, not included in the Biblical Canon

The New Testament apocrypha (singular apocryphon) are a number of writings by early Christians that give accounts of Jesus and his teachings, the nature of God, or the teachings of his apostles and of their lives. Some of these writings were cited as scripture by early Christians, but since the fifth century a widespread consensus has emerged limiting the New Testament to the 27 books of the modern canon. Protestant churches generally do not view the New Testament apocrypha as part of the Bible.

== Definition ==
The word apocrypha means 'things put away' or 'things hidden', originating from the Medieval Latin adjective apocryphus, 'secret' or 'non-canonical', which in turn originated from the Greek adjective ἀπόκρυφος (apokryphos), 'obscure', from the verb ἀποκρύπτειν (apokryptein), 'to hide away'. Apokryptein in turn comes from the Greek prefix apo-, meaning 'away', and the Greek verb kryptein, meaning 'to hide'.

The general term is usually applied to the books that were considered by the church as useful, but not divinely inspired. As such, to refer to Gnostic writings as "apocryphal" is misleading since they would not be classified in the same category by orthodox believers. Often used by the Greek Fathers was the term antilegomena, or 'spoken against', although some canonical books were also spoken against, such as the Apocalypse of John in the East. Often used by scholars is the term pseudepigrapha, meaning 'falsely inscribed' or 'falsely attributed', in the sense that the writings were written by an anonymous author who appended the name of an apostle to his work, such as in the Gospel of Peter or the Ethiopic Apocalypse of Enoch: almost all books, in both Old and New Testaments, called "apocrypha" in the Protestant tradition are pseudepigrapha. In the Catholic and Orthodox traditions, what are called the apocrypha by Protestants include the deuterocanonical books: in the Catholic tradition, the term apocrypha is synonymous with what Protestants would call the pseudepigrapha, the latter term of which is almost exclusively used by scholars.

== History ==
=== Development of the New Testament canon ===
That some works are categorized as New Testament apocrypha is indicative of the wide range of responses to the ministry of Jesus. During the first centuries following Jesus' ministry, considerable debate was held in regarding safeguarding the authenticity of his teachings. Three key methods developed to address this survive to the present day: ordination, where groups authorize individuals as reliable teachers of the message; creeds, where groups define the boundaries of interpretation of the message; and canons, which list the primary documents certain groups believe contain the message originally taught by Jesus.

The first centuries of Christianity saw substantial debate in regards to which books should be included in the canons. In general, those books that the majority regarded as the earliest books about Jesus were the ones included. Books that were not accepted into the canons are now termed apocryphal; some were vigorously suppressed and survive only as fragments, or only in mention in the writings of those condemning them. The earliest lists of canonical works of the New Testament were not quite the same as modern lists; for example, the Book of Revelation was regarded as disputed by some Christians (see Antilegomena), while the Shepherd of Hermas was considered genuine by others, and appears (after the Book of Revelation) in the Codex Sinaiticus.

The Syriac Peshitta, used by all the various Syrian churches, originally did not include 2 Peter, 2 John, 3 John, Jude and Revelation. This canon of 22 books is the one cited by John Chrysostom (~347–407) and Theodoret (393–466) from the School of Antioch. Western Syrians have added the remaining five books to their New Testament canons in modern times (such as the Lee Peshitta of 1823). Today, the official lectionaries followed by the Malankara Syrian Orthodox Church and the East Syriac Chaldean Catholic Church, which is in communion with the Holy See, still only present lessons from the 22 books of the original Peshitta.

The Armenian Apostolic church at times has included the Third Epistle to the Corinthians in its biblical canon, but does not always list it with the other 27 canonical New Testament books. The church did not accept Revelation into its Bible until 1200 CE.

=== Modern scholarship and translation ===
English translations were made in the early 18th century by William Wake and by Jeremiah Jones, and collected in 1820 by William Hone's Apocryphal New Testament. The series Ante-Nicene Fathers, volume 8, contains translations by Alexander Walker. New translations by M. R. James appeared in 1924, and were revised by J.K. Eliott, The Apocryphal New Testament, Oxford University Press, 1991. The "standard" scholarly edition of the New Testament Apocrypha in German is that of Schneemelcher, and in English its translation by Robert McLachlan Wilson.

Constantin von Tischendorf and other scholars began to study New Testament apocrypha seriously in the 19th century and produce new translations. The texts of the Nag Hammadi library are often considered separately but the current edition of Schneemelcher also contains eleven Nag Hammadi texts.

Books that are known objectively not to have existed in antiquity are usually not considered part of the New Testament apocrypha. Among these are the Libellus de Nativitate Sanctae Mariae (also called the "Nativity of Mary") and the Latin Infancy gospel. The latter two did not exist in antiquity, and they seem to be based on the earlier Infancy gospels.

== Gospels ==
=== Infancy gospels ===
Information about the childhood of Jesus was supplied by a number of 2nd-century and later texts, known as infancy gospels, none of which were accepted into the biblical canon. Despite this, some scholars have noted that the very number of surviving infancy manuscripts attests to their continued popularity.

Most of these manuscripts were based on the earliest infancy gospels, namely the Infancy Gospel of James (also called the "Protoevangelium of James") and the Infancy Gospel of Thomas, and on their later combination into the Gospel of Pseudo-Matthew (also called the "Infancy Gospel of Matthew" or "Birth of Mary and Infancy of the Saviour").

The other significant early infancy gospels are the Arabic Infancy Gospel, the Georgian Infancy Gospel, the Ethiopian Infancy Gospel / History of Jesus and Mary, the Libellus de Nativitate Sanctae Mariae, the Armenian Infancy Gospel, the Slavonic Infancy Gospel, the Infancy Gospel of the Savior, the Coptic Infancy Gospel, the History of Joseph the Carpenter, the Transitus Mariae / Gospel of the Dormition, and the Life of John the Baptist.

=== Jewish-Christian gospels ===
The Jewish–Christian Gospels were gospels of a Jewish Christian character quoted by Clement of Alexandria, Origen, Eusebius, Epiphanius, Jerome and probably Didymus the Blind. Most modern scholars have concluded that there existed one gospel in Aramaic/Hebrew and at least two in Greek, although a minority argue that there were only two: one Aramaic/Hebrew and one Greek.

None of these gospels survive today, but attempts have been made to reconstruct them from references in the Church Fathers. The reconstructed texts of the gospels are usually categorized under New Testament Apocrypha. The standard edition of Schneemelcher describes the texts of three Jewish–Christian gospels as follows:

1. The Gospel of the Ebionites ("GE") – 7 quotations by Epiphanius.
2. The Gospel of the Hebrews ("GH") – 1 quotation ascribed to Cyril of Jerusalem, plus GH 2–7 quotations by Clement, Origen, and Jerome.
3. The Gospel of the Nazarenes ("GN") – GN 1 to GN 23 are mainly from Jerome; GN 24 to GN 36 are from medieval sources.

Some scholars consider that the two last named are in fact the same source.

=== Non-canonical gospels ===
- Gospel of Marcion (mid-2nd century)
- Gospel of Mani (3rd century)
- Gospel of Apelles (mid–late 2nd century, similar to Marcion)
- Gospel of Bardesanes (late 2nd–early 3rd century)
- Gospel of Basilides (mid-2nd century)
- Gospel of Thomas (2nd century; sayings gospel)
- Gospel of Gamaliel
- Gospel of Barnabas

=== Passion Gospels ===
A number of gospels are concerned specifically with the "Passion" (from the Latin verb patior, passus sum; "to suffer, bear, endure", from which also "patience, patient", etc.)) of Jesus:

- Gospel of Peter
- Gospel of Nicodemus (also called the "Acts of Pilate")
- Pseudo-Cyril of Jerusalem, On the Life and the Passion of Christ
- Gospel of Bartholomew
- Questions of Bartholomew
- Book of the Resurrection of Jesus Christ, by Bartholomew the Apostle

Although three texts take Bartholomew's name, it may be that either the Questions of Bartholomew or the Resurrection of Jesus Christ is in fact the unknown Gospel of Bartholomew.

=== Harmonized gospels ===
A number of texts aim to provide a single harmonization of the canonical gospels, that eliminates discordances among them by presenting a unified text derived from them to some degree. The most widely read of these was the Diatessaron.

== Gnostic texts about Jesus Christ ==
In the modern era, many Gnostic texts have been uncovered, especially from the Nag Hammadi library. Some texts take the form of an expounding of the esoteric cosmology and ethics held by the Gnostics. Often this was in the form of dialogue in which Jesus expounds esoteric knowledge while his disciples raise questions concerning it. There is also a text, known as the Epistula Apostolorum, which is a polemic against Gnostic esoterica, but written in a similar style as the Gnostic texts.

=== Dialogues with Jesus ===
- Apocryphon of James (also called the "Secret Book of James")
- Book of Thomas the Contender
- Dialogue of the Saviour
- Gospel of Judas (also called the "Gospel of Judas Iscariot")
- Gospel of Mary
- Gospel of Philip
- Greek Gospel of the Egyptians (distinct from the Coptic Gospel of the Egyptians)
- The Sophia of Jesus Christ
- Letter of Peter to Philip

=== General texts concerning Jesus ===
- Coptic Apocalypse of Paul (distinct from the Apocalypse of Paul)
- Gospel of Truth
- Gnostic Apocalypse of Peter (distinct from the Apocalypse of Peter)
- Letter of Lentulus
- Pistis Sophia
- Second Treatise of the Great Seth
- Secret Gospel of Mark
- Book of Baruch (Gospel by Justin)

=== Sethian texts concerning Jesus ===
The Sethians were a gnostic group who originally worshipped the biblical Seth as a messianic figure, later treating Jesus as a re-incarnation of Seth. They produced numerous texts expounding their esoteric cosmology, usually in the form of visions:

- Apocryphon of John (also called the "Secret Gospel of John")
- Coptic Gospel of the Egyptians (distinct from the Greek Gospel of the Egyptians)
- Trimorphic Protennoia

=== Ritual diagrams ===
Some of the Gnostic texts appear to consist of diagrams and instructions for use in religious rituals:

- Ophite Diagrams
- Books of Jeu

== Acts ==
Several texts concern themselves with the subsequent lives of the apostles, usually with highly supernatural events. Almost half of these, anciently called The Circuits of the Apostles and now known by the name of their purported author, "Leucius Charinus" (supposedly a companion of John the Apostle), contained the Acts of Peter, John, Andrew, Thomas, and Paul. These were judged by the Patriarch Photios I of Constantinople in the ninth century to be full of folly, self-contradiction, falsehood, and impiety. The Acts of Thomas and the Acts of Peter and the Twelve are often considered Gnostic texts. While most of the texts are believed to have been written in the 2nd century, at least two, the Acts of Barnabas and the Acts of Peter and Paul are believed to have been written as late as the 5th century.

- Acts of Andrew
- Acts of Barnabas
- Acts of John
- Acts of Mar Mari
- Acts of the Martyrs
- Acts of Paul
- Acts of Paul and Thecla
- Acts of Peter
- Acts of Peter and Andrew
- Acts of Peter and Paul
- Acts of Peter and the Twelve
- Acts of Philip
- Acts of Pilate
- Acts of Thomas
- Acts of Timothy
- Acts of Xanthippe, Polyxena, and Rebecca
- The Lost Chapter of the Acts of the Apostles
- Acts of John in Rome
- Acts of Andrew and Bartholomew
- Acts of Andrew and Matthias
- Act of Peter
- Acts of Thaddeus
- Passion of Saints Perpetua and Felicity

== Epistles ==
There are also non-canonical epistles (or "letters") between individuals or to Christians in general. Some of them were regarded very highly by the early church. Those marked with a lozenge (♦) are included in the collection known as the Apostolic Fathers:

- Epistle of Barnabas ♦
- First Epistle of Clement ♦
- Second Epistle of Clement ♦
- Epistle of Ignatius to the Smyrnaeans ♦
- Epistle of Ignatius to the Trallians ♦
- Epistle of Ignatius to the Ephesians ♦
- Epistle of Ignatius to the Magnesians ♦
- Epistle of Ignatius to the Romans ♦
- Epistle of Ignatius to the Philadelphians ♦
- Epistle of Ignatius to Polycarp ♦
- Epistle of Polycarp to the Philippians ♦
- Epistle of Mathetes to Diognetus ♦
- Martyrdom of Polycarp ♦
- Epistle to the Laodiceans (an epistle in the name of Paul)
- Epistle to Seneca the Younger (an epistle in the name of Paul)
- Third Epistle to the Corinthians – accepted in the past by some in the Armenian Orthodox church.
- Epistula Apostolorum
- Epistle of Pseudo-Titus
- Epistle to the Alexandrians
- Letter to Flora - Gnostic text

== Apocalypses ==
Several works frame themselves as visions, often discussing the future, afterlife, or both:

- Apocalypse of Paul (distinct from the Coptic Apocalypse of Paul; also called the Apocalypse of the Virgin)
- Apocalypse of Peter (distinct from the Gnostic Apocalypse of Peter)
- Apocalypse of Thomas (also called the Revelation of Thomas)
- Apocalypse of Stephen (also called the Revelation of Stephen)
- First Apocalypse of James (also called the First Revelation of James)
- Second Apocalypse of James (also called the Second Revelation of James)
- Second Apocalypse of John (also called the [First] Apocryphal Apocalypse of John)
- Apocalypse of James (Syriac)
- Apocalypse of John Chrysostom
- Apocalypse of Adam
- Apocalypse of Abraham
- Apocalypse of Sedrach
- Apocalypse of Simeon Kepha - an anti-Nestorian polemical text
- The Shepherd of Hermas (also included in the collection known as the Apostolic Fathers)

== Fate of Mary ==
Several texts (over 50) consist of descriptions of the events surrounding the varied fate of Mary (the mother of Jesus):

- The Home Going of Mary
- The Falling Asleep of the Mother of God
- The Descent of Mary

== Texts regarding Islam ==
A number of apocryphal texts were written in response to the Islamic conquest of Egypt and Syria, that were circulated underground among the Coptic and Syriac communities living under the Umayyad Caliphate. These texts seek to address the collective trauma of the Christian communities living in the Middle East caused by the renewed persecution of Christianity since the Diocletianic Persecution by the Muslim conquerors which followed the sectarian violence caused by the Chalcedonian schism, while seeking to interpret the relationship between Christians and Muslims, thereby influencing medieval Christian perception of Islam. Most of these texts are of a Miaphysite orientation, and are also disparaging towards Chalcedonianism to some extent.

1. Apocalypse of Pseudo-Athanasius - (mis)attributed to Athanasius of Alexandria
2. Arabic Homily of Pseudo-Theophilus of Alexandria - (mis)attributed to Theophillus I of Alexandria
3. Apocalypse of Shenute - (mis)attributed to Shenute
4. Apocalypse of Pseudo-Methodius - (mis)attributed to Methodius of Olympus. A purported modified version focused on the Christian centre of Edessa also exists
5. Apocalypse of John the Little - (mis)attributed to Apostle John
6. Apocalypse of Pseudo-Ezra - (mis)attributed to Ezra
7. Apocalypse of Pseudo-Ephraem - (mis)attributed to Ephraem the Syrian
8. Gospel of the Twelve Apostles - (mis)attributed to the collective authorship of the Apostles.
9. Second Apocalypse of John - (mis)attributed to John of Patmos, author of the Book of Revelation.
10. Arabic Apocalypse of Peter - (mis)attributed to Peter.

== Miscellany ==
These texts, due to their content or form, do not fit into the other categories:

- Apostolic Constitutions (church regulations supposedly asserted by the apostles)
- Canons of the Apostles
- Cave of Treasures (also called The Treasure)
- Clementine literature
- Didache (possibly the first written catechism) (also included in the collection known as the Apostolic Fathers.)
- Liturgy of St James
- Doctrine of Addai
- Prayer of Paul
- Sentences of Sextus
- Physiologus
- Book of the Bee
- The Mysteries of John (Mysteries of Saint John and the Holy Virgin)
- Investiture of Abbaton
- Investiture of the Archangel Michael
- Investiture of the Archangel Gabriel
- Didascalia Apostolorum
- Sunday Letter
- Apostolic Church-Ordinance
- Apostolic Canons
- Letter of Pilate to Claudius
- Letter of Pilate to Herod
- Letter of Pilate to Tiberius
- Letter of Tiberius to Pilate
- Mors Pilati
- Alexandrine Sinodos
- Ethiopic Book of the Cock (Mäṣḥafä Dorho)
- Ethiopic Book of the Covenant (Mäṣḥafä Kidan)
- Sirate Tsion (the book of order)
- Tizaz (the book of Herald)
- Gitsew
- Abtilis
- The I book of Dominos
- The II book of Dominos
- Testamentum Domini
- Testament of Adam
- Josephus on Jesus
- Nishmat (attributed by medieval Jewish sources to the Apostle Peter)
- Gabriel's Revelation
- Apology of Aristides
- Peri Pascha
- On the Priesthood of Jesus
- The Dream of the Rood
- Ecclesiastical History (Eusebius)
- Letter of Abgar to Jesus
- Apostles' Creed
- Mystery of Heaven and Earth
- Liber Requiei Mariae
- Revelation of the Magi

== Fragments ==
In addition to the known apocryphal works, there are also small fragments of texts, parts of unknown (or uncertain) works. Some of the more significant fragments are:

- The Gospel of the Saviour
- The Naassene Fragment
- The Fayyum Fragment
- The Secret Gospel of Mark, whose authenticity has been challenged
- The Oxyrhynchus Gospels
- The Egerton Gospel
- Agrapha
- The Preaching of Peter
- Greek Gospel of the Egyptians
- Armenian Gospel of the Baptism
- Gospel of Jesus' Wife

== Lost works ==
Several texts are mentioned in many ancient sources and would probably be considered part of the apocrypha, but no known text has survived:

- Gospel of Eve (a quotation from this gospel is given by Epiphanius (Haer. xxvi. 2, 3). It is possible that this is the Gospel of Perfection he alludes to in xxvi. 2. The quotation shows that this gospel was the expression of complete pantheism)
- Gospel of the Four Heavenly Realms
- Gospel of Matthias (probably different from the Gospel of Matthew)
- Gospel of Perfection (used by the followers of Basilides and other Gnostics. See Epiphanius, Haer. xxvi. 2)
- Gospel of the Seventy
- Gospel of Thaddaeus (This may be a synonym for the Gospel of Judas. The name Thaddeus was often used not to confuse Jude the Apostle for Judas Iscariot)
- Gospel of the Twelve
- Memoria Apostolorum
- Book of Elchasai
- Gospel of Andrew
- Gospel of Bartholomew
- Gospel of Hesychius – mentioned only by Jerome and the Gelasian Decree, both of which list it as apocryphal
- Gospel of Lucius – mentioned only by Jerome and the Gelasian Decree, which list it as apocryphal
- Memoirs of the Apostles – a lost narrative of the life of Jesus, mentioned by Justin Martyr; the passages quoted by Justin may have originated from a gospel harmony of the Synoptic Gospels composed by Justin or his school.
- Ascents of James

== Close candidates for canonization ==
While many of the books listed here were considered heretical (especially those belonging to the gnostic tradition—as this sect was considered heretical by Proto-orthodox Christianity of the early centuries), others were not considered particularly heretical in content, but in fact were well accepted as significant spiritual works. Those marked with a lozenge (♦) are also included in the collection known as the Apostolic Fathers.

While some of the following works appear in complete Bibles from the fourth century, such as 1 Clement and The Shepherd of Hermas, showing their general popularity, they were not included when the canon was formally decided at the end of that century.

- Epistle of Barnabas ♦
- First Epistle of Clement ♦
- Second Epistle of Clement ♦
- Epistle of Ignatius to the Smyrnaeans ♦
- Epistle of Ignatius to the Trallians ♦
- Epistle of Ignatius to the Ephesians ♦
- Epistle of Ignatius to the Magnesians ♦
- Epistle of Ignatius to the Romans ♦
- Epistle of Ignatius to the Philadelphians ♦
- Epistle of Ignatius to Polycarp ♦
- Epistle of Polycarp to the Philippians ♦
- Epistle of Mathetes to Diognetus ♦
- Martyrdom of Polycarp ♦
- Shepherd of Hermas ♦
- Didache ♦
- Apocalypse of Peter
- Third Epistle to the Corinthians

== Evaluation ==
=== Present day ===
Among historians of early Christianity, the books are considered invaluable, especially those that almost made it into the final canon, such as Shepherd of Hermas. Bart Ehrman, for example, said:

The victors in the struggles to establish Christian Orthodoxy not only won their theological battles, they also rewrote the history of the conflict; later readers then naturally assumed that the victorious views had been embraced by the vast majority of Christians from the very beginning ... The practice of Christian forgery has a long and distinguished history ... the debate lasted three hundred years ... even within "orthodox" circles there was considerable debate concerning which books to include.

=== Historical development towards today's canon ===
The historical debate primarily concerned whether certain works should be read in the church service or only privately. These works were widely used but not necessarily considered Catholic or 'universal.' Such works include the Didache, Shepherd of Hermas, 1 Clement, 2 Clement, the Epistle of Barnabas, and to a lesser extent the Apocalypse of Peter.

Considering the generally accepted dates of authorship for all of the canonical New Testament works (c. 100 CE), as well as the various witnesses to canonicity extant among the writings of Ignatius, Polycarp, Irenaeus, etc., the four gospels and letters of Paul were held by the gentile Christian community as scriptural, and 200 years were needed to finalize the canon; from the beginning of the 2nd Century to the mid-4th Century, no book in the final canon was ever declared spurious or heretical, except for the Revelation of John which the Council of Laodicea in 363–364 CE rejected (although it accepted all of the other 26 books in the New Testament). This was possibly due to fears of the influence of Montanism which used the book extensively to support their theology. See Revelation of John for more details.

Athanasius wrote his Easter letter in 367 CE which defined a canon of 27 books, identical to the current canon, but also listed two works that were "not in the canon but to be read": The Shepherd of Hermas and the Didache. Nevertheless, the early church leaders in the 3rd and 4th Centuries generally distinguished between canonical works and those that were not canonical but 'useful,' or 'good for teaching,' though never relegating any of the final 27 books to the latter category. One aim with establishing the canon was to capture only those works which were held to have been written by the Apostles, or their close associates, and as the Muratorian fragment canon (c. 150–175 CE) states concerning the Shepherd of Hermas:

...But Hermas wrote The Shepherd very recently, in our times, in the city of Rome, while bishop Pius, his brother, was occupying the chair of the church of the city of Rome. And therefore it ought indeed to be read; but it cannot be read publicly to the people in church either among the Prophets, whose number is complete, or among the Apostles, for it is after their time.

== Published collections ==
- Cumberlege, Geoffrey (1926) [1895]. The Apocrypha: translated out of the Greek and Latin tongues: being the version set forth A.D. 1611 compared with the most ancient authorities and revised A.D. 1894 (reprint ed.). Oxford: University Press.
- Michel, Charles; Peeters, Paul (1924) [1911]. Évangiles Apocryphes (in French) (2nd ed.). Paris: A. Picard.
- James, Montague Rhodes (1953) [1924]. The Apocryphal New Testament (2nd ed.). Oxford: Clarendon Press.
- González-Blanco, Edmundo, ed. (1934). Los Evangelio Apócrifos (in Spanish). Vol. 3 vols. Madrid: Bergua.
- Bonaccorsi, Giuseppe, ed. (1948). Vangeli apocrifi (in Italian). Florence: Libreria Editrice Fiorentina.
- Aurelio de Santos Otero, ed. (1956). Los Evangelios Apócrifos: Colección de textos griegos y latinos, versión crítica, estudios introductorios y comentarios (in Spanish). Madrid: Biblioteca de Autores Christianos.
- Kekeliże, Korneli, ed. (1959). Kartuli versiebi aṗoḳripebis mocikulta šesaxeb [Georgian Versions of the Apocryphal Acts of the Apostles]. Tbilisi: Sakartvelos SSR mecnierebata akademiis gamomcemloba.
- Moraldi, Luigi, ed. (1994) [1971]. Apocrifi del Nuovo Testamento (in Italian). Translated by Moraldi, Luigi (2nd ed.). Turin: Unione tipografico-editrice torinese.
- Robinson, James M. (1977). The Nag Hammadi Library in English. San Francisco: Harper & Row.
- Erbetta, Mario, ed. (1966–1981). Gli Apocrifi del Nuovo Testamento (in Italian). Vol. 3 vols. Translated by Erbetta, Mario. Turin: Marietti.
- Aurelio de Santos Otero (1978–1981). Die handschriftliche Überlieferung der altslavischen Apokryphen (in German). Vol. 2 vols. Berlin: De Gruyter.
- Herbert, Máire; McNamara, Martin (1989). Irish Biblical Apocrypha: Selected Texts in Translation. Edinburgh: T. & T. Clark.
- Elliott, J. K. (1993). Apocryphal New Testament.
- Bovon, François; Geoltrain, Pierre; Kaestli, Jean-Daniel, eds. (1997–2005). Écrits apocryphes chrétiens (in French). Paris: Gallimard.
- Ehrman, Bart D.; Pleše, Zlatko (2011). The Apocryphal Gospels: Texts and Translations. Oxford, UK: Oxford University Press. ISBN 978-0-19-973210-4.
- Markschies, Christoph; Schröter, Jens, eds. (2012). Antike christliche Apokryphen in deutscher Übersetzung (in German). Tübingen, Germany: Mohr Siebeck.
- Burke, Tony; Landau, Brent, eds. (2016). New Testament apocrypha: More noncanonical scriptures. Vol. 1. Grand Rapids. MI: Eerdmans. ISBN 978-0-8028-7289-0.
- Burke, Tony, ed. (2020). New Testament apocrypha: More noncanonical scriptures. Vol. 2. Grand Rapids. MI: Eerdmans. ISBN 978-0-8028-7290-6.
- Burke, Tony, ed. (2023). New Testament apocrypha: More noncanonical scriptures. Vol. 3. Grand Rapids. MI: Eerdmans. ISBN 978-0-8028-7793-2.

== See also ==
- Apostolic Fathers
- Authorship of the Pauline epistles
- Biblical apocrypha
- Biblical canon
- Books of the Bible
- List of early Christian writers
- History of Christianity
- Historicity of Jesus
- List of Gospels
- Nag Hammadi library
- The Q document, a hypothetical document underlying much of the text of the canonical gospels of Matthew and Luke
- Textual criticism

== Sources ==
- Brock, Sebastian P. (1971). "A Fragment of the Acta Pilati in Christian Palestinian Aramaic". The Journal of Theological Studies. 22 (1): 157–159. doi:10.1093/jts/XXII.I.157. JSTOR 23962351.
- Brock, Sebastian P. (1969). "A Syriac Version of the Letters of Lentulus and Pilate". Orientalia Christiana Periodica. 35: 45–62.
- Cameron, Ron (1982). The Other Gospels: Non-Canonical Gospel Texts. Westminster/John Knox. ISBN 978-0-664-24428-6.
- Ehrman, Bart D.; Pleše, Zlatko (2011). "The Jewish Christian Gospels". The Apocryphal Gospels: Texts and Translations. Oxford University Press. pp. 197–216. ISBN 978-0-19-973210-4. "216."
- Elliott, James Keith (2005) [1993]. The Apocryphal New Testament. Oxford University Press. ISBN 978-0-19-826181-0.
- Schlarb, Egbert; Lührmann, Dieter (2000). "Hebräerevangelium". Fragmente apokryph gewordener Evangelien in griechischer und lateinischer Sprache (in German). N.G. Elwert Verlag. ISBN 978-3-7708-1144-1. OL 6868179M.
- Vielhauer, Philipp; Strecker, Georg [in German] (1991). Schneemelcher, Wilhelm; Wilson, Robert McLachlan (eds.). New Testament Apocrypha: Gospels and Related Writings Volume 1 (2 ed.). John Knox Press. ISBN 0-664-22721-X. (6th German edition, translated by George Ogg)
- Yamauchi, Edwin M. (1979). "Apocryphal Gospels". In Bromiley, Geoffrey W. (ed.). International Standard Bible Encyclopedia: A–D Volume 1. Wm. B. Eerdmans. pp. 181–88. ISBN 978-0-8028-3781-3.
