= Gospel of Bartholomew =

Unknown work of New Testament apocrypha

The Gospel of Bartholomew is a missing text of New Testament apocrypha, known only from mentions by other sources. It might be the same as the Questions of Bartholomew, the Coptic Book of Bartholomew, or neither and be a fully lost work. The references do not go into particular detail about the nature of the work, leaving scholars little more than a name to work with. It was presumably attributed to Bartholomew the Apostle.

== Primary sources ==
In the prologue to his commentary on Matthew, Jerome mentions a "Gospel of Bartholomew" among several other apocryphal gospels. Jerome doesn't indicate anything more about the work other than that the gospels on his list have "been the beginning of various heresies." It is unknown if Jerome had personal knowledge of the work, or was simply trusting another source such as Origen of Alexandria. This is the oldest surviving reference to the work, as the commentary was written around 398 CE. Later references to the Gospel may well have been only trusting Jerome on the matter, rather than having personal knowledge.

The Gelasian Decree is a 6th-century work, although it is considered possible parts of it might date back earlier. It includes "the Gospels in the name of Bartholomew" in a list of condemned or unacceptable scriptures.

Pseudo-Dionysius the Areopagite and Epiphanius the Monk both make passing references to a Gospel of Bartholomew. The Syriac Book of Secrets has a quote mentioning a Gospel of Bartholomew as well. The Venerable Bede also mentions the book, but only as part of a quotation of Jerome. Heinrich von Herford claims that Holy Roman Emperor Ludwig IV was acquainted with a Gospel of Bartholomew as well. All of these references are sparse and late. It is unclear whether they were referring to the same book, a different gospel by that name, or were simple mistakes or misstatements.

== Analysis ==
There is little to be said without further knowledge of the work. One area of speculation has been if the Gospel of Bartholomew was Gnostic or not, as Gnosticism was a major target of anti-heresy tracts of the early Church, and this would explain the later hostile references. Another guess is that the work may have been linked with Egypt or Egyptian cultural practices somehow, as Bartholomew the Apostle seems to have been more revered in Egyptian Christianity than elsewhere.

Whatever the Gospel may have been, it does not seem likely that it was some proto-version that both the Questions of Bartholomew and the Coptic Book of Bartholomew descended from, as the two works are quite different. There are some more distant possibilities: there exists an Armenian Acts and Martyrdom of Bartholomew, and Eusebius recounts a legend of Bartholomew traveling to India with a Hebrew version of the Gospel of Matthew. Scholars do not think Jerome had any knowledge of the first, and he certainly would not have meant to condemn the Gospel of Matthew.

== See also ==
- List of Gospels
