= Questions of Bartholomew =

Christian New Testament apocrypha

The Questions of Bartholomew is a work of Christian New Testament apocrypha which describes a dialogue between Jesus and Bartholomew the Apostle. In two versions of the work, it is a post-resurrection dialogue with the Risen Jesus, while the Church Slavonic version places the dialogue during Jesus's ministry before his death. In it, various topics are discussed, notably an expansion on the role of the Devil and a version of the Harrowing of Hell.

The work is not to be confused with the Coptic Book of Bartholomew, a separate work. Additionally, Jerome mentions a mysterious Gospel of Bartholomew in one of his writings, albeit dismissively as a "source of heresies". It is not known whether Jerome (or the source Jerome was trusting) was referring to the Questions of Bartholomew with this comment, as no further details are provided.

== History ==
The text survives as Greek, Latin, and Old Church Slavonic manuscripts, although each copy varies from the others considerably in the wording chosen. It is of similar style to the Apocalypse of St. John the Divine, although sensational instead of seeking to frighten. It is framed as a dialogue from Jesus to the apostles (it varies significantly as to at which stage in time between the manuscripts), instigated by a series of extremely daring and outrageous questions and requests by Bartholomew.

The text appears to have been quite popular, judging by how well it survived, perhaps due to depictions of the supernatural. For example, the text implies that The Fall of Man was caused by Satan poisoning the water of Eden.

The text draws heavily on Jewish mysticism (such as the Book of Enoch), seeking to provide an explanation of the more supernatural aspects of Christian thought at the time. However, rather than a more clinical treatment that would be expected for such a treatise, it approaches these topics in a tabloid manner, evidently seeking to be a popular work rather than one for official church teaching.

== Narrative ==
Initially, the text describes how Jesus descended into hell in his own words, and then jumps to discussing the virginal conception when Mary arrives amongst the apostles. Next, the apostles ask for a vision of hell, and angels roll up the earth to let them, and then return the earth when they have glimpsed it.

=== Satan's Testimony ===
Finally, Bartholomew asks to see Satan, and so a choir of angels drags Beliar (a name for Satan) from the depths of hell in chains, the sight of which kills the apostles dead. Jesus immediately brings them back to life and gives Bartholomew control over Satan. Bartholomew asks Satan how he came to be the enemy and other questions on esoteric subjects such as the hierarchy of the angels. He also explains the story of his removal from heaven. Satan's testimony also includes an admission to his role as the leader of six hundred fallen angels that fell with him.

=== Salpsan ===
The work is unique for the detail of introducing a direct son to Satan, named Salpsan. He is notably absent from the Latin version, appearing only in the Greek text.

And I [Satan] looked about and saw the six hundred who were under me senseless. And I awakened my son Salpsan and took him to counsel how I might deceive the man on whose account I was cast out of the heavens.

Satan and his son here have been interpreted as a counterpart to the Father and Son in Christianity. Although Salpsan was previously considered a possible reference to the Antichrist, authors have linked him instead to the Enochian tradition of the Watchers and their monstrous offspring. He is also compared to Cain in accounts where the latter is sired by the fallen angel Samael after seducing Eve.

== See also ==
- Decretum Gelasianum
- Gospel of Bartholomew
- Iblis
- New Testament apocrypha
