= Book of Bartholomew =

Coptic New Testament apocrypha

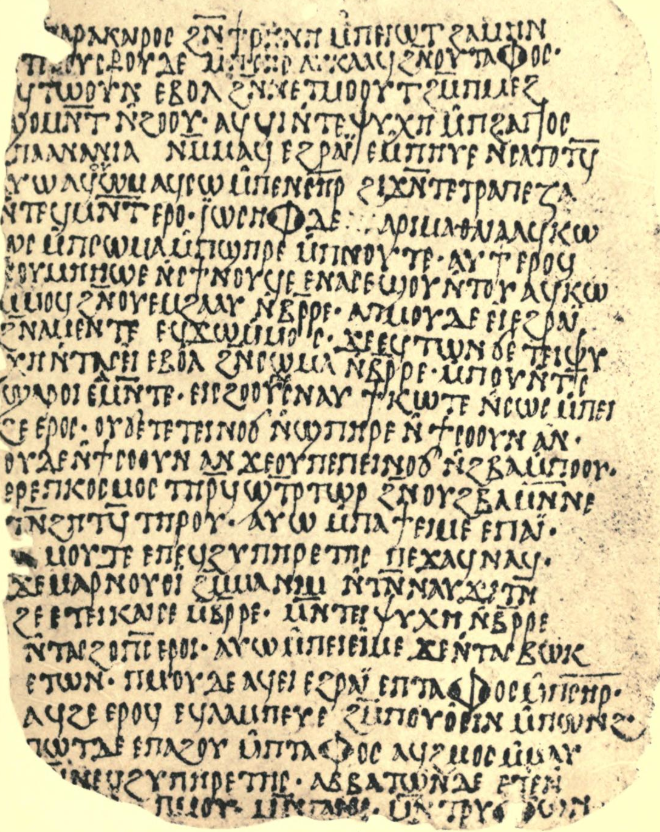
First page of manuscript Oriental 6804, held by the British Library, showing the start of the Book of Bartholomew

The Book of Bartholomew, also known as the Book of the Resurrection of Jesus Christ, by Bartholomew the Apostle, is a pseudonymous work of New Testament apocrypha. It survives only in the Coptic language, which was the probable original language of the text. The date of authorship is uncertain. Most scholars favor it to have been written in the 5th or 6th century, although an even later date of perhaps the 8th or 9th century has been suggested. Much of the work is in the form of an apostolic memoir, a genre common in Coptic homilies.

Much of the work is about the theological implications of the Passion of Jesus. It also includes lists of angelic beings and depictions of heaven, as well as hymns perhaps used for liturgy. The initial section of the Book of Bartholomew is a retelling of the Harrowing of Hell, where Jesus interacts with the personification of Death and frees most souls from Hades in the three day period between his death and resurrection. The middle section of the work is pseudepigraphically attributed to the testimony of Bartholomew the Apostle, a figure who was held in much higher esteem in Egyptian Coptic Christianity than elsewhere. He tells tales of hymns sung by angels and special blessings placed on Mary Magdalene and the apostles. Bartholomew and the apostles then celebrate a Eucharist together. The final section shifts to the acts of Thomas the Apostle. Thomas's son Siophanes is resurrected and returns with tales of heavenly geography he traveled while dead; the astonished denizens of the city convert en masse, and Thomas makes Siophanes their bishop. Thomas travels back to the Mount of Olives via cloud, and re-enacts the story of Doubting Thomas where he demands to see the risen Jesus and touch his wounds. Jesus ascends back to heaven, and the apostles celebrate another Eucharist.

The book is not to be confused with the Questions of Bartholomew, a separate work. There is a mysterious Gospel of Bartholomew referred to in some ancient church writings; it is not known whether it referred to this work, the Questions of Bartholomew, or a lost work.

== Sources and authorship ==
The text is known from three manuscripts, as well as one fragment from a fourth manuscript. All are written in the Coptic language. The most complete manuscript ("C") is held by the British Library and was acquired by Robert de Rustafjaell in Egypt in the early 20th century. It was created in the 10th or 11th century, and is 24 pages long (48 sides). Two other manuscripts, "A" and "B", were found at the White Monastery in Sohag, Egypt. They have been dated to the 9th or 10th century, but are more fragmentary than the British Library C manuscript. To the frustration of scholars, the pages to A and B were separated and sold piecemeal around the world. The fourth possible fragment is held by the Egyptian Museum of Berlin.

The work's author is unknown, but they were probably Egyptian. The tradition identifying Bartholomew as a gardener is largely only found in Egypt. The text bears similarities with 4th and 5th-century Coptic homilies in style. It was probably composed in the 5th century at the earliest, as it refers to Mary with the honorary title "the one who gave birth to God", and the Council of Ephesus that gave Mary the title Theotokos was in 431 CE. Most scholars favor a composition date of the 5th or 6th century, albeit perhaps adapting some existing older material; a few such as Matthias Westerhoff favor a much later creation date in the 8th or 9th century.

== Contents ==
The text starts with a description of Jesus at a supper with the apostles (presumably the Last Supper) and him being aware of his own fate, the coming crucifixion. Jesus resurrects a rooster whose meat they are eating as a prefiguring of his own death and resurrection. It is followed by a tale in which a man named Ananias attempts to stand in for Jesus (i.e. die in his place) during the proceedings on Good Friday, but the priests are initially unable to kill him, even though they try stoning and putting him in an oven. Jesus is killed, and Death visits him at his tomb, where the two have three dialogues.

Subsequently, the text describes Jesus descending into hell, and finds Judas Iscariot already there. He condemns Judas with thirty curses in a diatribe. Jesus then rescues everyone from hell, with the exceptions of Judas, Cain, and Herod the Great. Death and his six sons find Hell nearly deserted, and acknowledge Jesus's superior power as the Son of God. This is followed by a flashback described by Philogenes the gardener to the night when angels, fiery chariots, and God, descended to earth, and resurrected Jesus in a dialogue with the women at the tomb.

Bartholomew then shares a vision with the apostles. He describes the highest levels of heaven, filled with thousands of angels and proclamations of special blessings on Mary, mother of Jesus, Jesus, and Adam. The angels sing various hymns in a divine liturgy, whose lyrics are listed in full. Adam and Eve return to paradise, and are given primacy in the New Jerusalem or City of Christ in heaven, greeting those who pass by the gate of life. Bartholomew then has a flashback about a divine visitation at the Mount of Olives where the apostles were given special blessings and had a dialogue with each other. The apostles celebrate a Eucharist afterward. Jesus entrusts the apostles to Peter as their new 'father'.

Meanwhile, the story shifts to Thomas the Apostle, who was absent as he went back to his hometown after receiving a report of the death of his son Siophanes. Thomas goes to his burial site and commands his resurrection. On returning to life, Siophanes describes what the afterlife was like, including a vision of thrones for all of the twelve apostles. Thomas proceeds to baptize all of the amazed townsfolk, who number some 12,000, and makes Siophanes the bishop of the new church.

Thomas returns on a cloud to the Mount of Olives, where the apostles are waiting for him. A loose version of the Incredulity of Thomas then occurs where Thomas is surprised to see Jesus resurrected (despite having just brought his own son back to life via invoking Jesus's name); the risen Jesus shows Thomas his wounds and proves his physicality. Thomas and the apostles then celebrate another eucharist. Then they disperse to evangelize.

== Title ==
The 1913 edition of the work published by E. A. Wallis Budge called the work The Book of the Resurrection, by Bartholomew the Apostle. This is because of a subscript found toward the end of the work stating "This is the book of the resurrection of Jesus Christ, our Lord, in joy and exultation. In peace, Amen!" Alin Suciu argued that this was not likely to be correct, given that the most complete C version of the text continues on past this subscript, and this subscript was not intended to title the work. Suicu instead says that the title of the work was just Book of Bartholomew, based on a fragment of manuscript A that had been previously neglected due to the manuscript's separation. The fragment includes text saying that work is "A 'Book of Bartholomew' about the time that our Lord Jesus Christ, arose from [the dead]..."

== Theology ==
A common point of speculation about many Egyptian works is the influence of Gnosticism, which seems to have been more popular in Egypt than elsewhere. Wilhelm Schneemelcher remarked that while isolated Gnostic motifs can perhaps be seen, the general tendency of the work is not Gnostic.

Alin Suciu has argued that the work had been intended for liturgical use on The Day of the Resurrection, 17 Parmouti in the old Egyptian calendar.

== Bibliography ==
- Bull, Christian H.; Tsakos, Alexander (2020). "The Book of Bartholomew: A New Translation and Introduction". In Burke, Tony (ed.). New Testament Apocrypha: More Noncanonical Scriptures. Vol. 2. Eerdmans. pp. 87–126. ISBN 978-0-8028-7290-6.
- Schneemelcher, Wilhelm (1963) [1959]. "Coptic Texts of Bartholomew". In Schneemelcher, Wilhelm (ed.). New Testament Apocrypha: Volume One: Gospels and Related Writings. Translated by Wilson, Robert McLachlan. Philadelphia: Westminster Press. pp. 484–486, 503–508.
- Suciu, Alin (2015a). "The Recovery of the Lost Fragment Preserving the Title of the Coptic Book of Bartholomew". Apocrypha 26. pp. 239–259.
- Suciu, Alin (2015b). "The Book of Bartholomew: A Coptic Apostolic Memoir.". Apocrypha 26. pp. 211–237.
