= Libellus de Nativitate Sanctae Mariae =

New Testament apocrypha

Libellus de Nativitate Sanctae Mariae ("Book on the Birth of Saint Mary"), known in English as the Nativity of Mary or the Gospel of the Nativity of Mary, and as De Nativitate Mariae (DNM) in short form, is a Medieval Latin text of New Testament apocrypha concerning the events surrounding the birth of Mary, mother of Jesus, up to the Annunciation. It is an adaptation of the first twelve chapters of the Gospel of Pseudo-Matthew, blended with elements of the canonical Gospel of Matthew and Gospel of Luke. The nativity of Jesus and his childhood miracles found in the later parts of Pseudo-Matthew are omitted, and the narrative focuses exclusively on Mary: her origins, her family, God's influence in her life, and her purity and perpetual virginity.

The text was composed in medieval France, probably in the 10th century (c. 900–1000), though the late 9th century is also considered possible. For centuries, it circulated under the name of Saint Jerome as an authentic translation from a Hebrew original by Matthew the Evangelist, and it was included among Jerome's works in early printed editions. The work achieved great popularity throughout Western Europe during the High Middle Ages, surviving in more than 150 manuscripts and serving as a prime source for the Life of the Virgin in liturgical readings, medieval drama, and collections like Jacobus de Voragine's Golden Legend.

== Authorship and composition date ==
The author of the Libellus de Nativitate Sanctae Mariae is anonymous. Literary and theological analysis indicates that the author was an educated French cleric or monk. He seems to have drawn heavily on the Augustinian Mariology developed by 9th-century Carolingian theologians.

Dating the work's composition remains a subject of discussion among scholars, with modern estimates generally pointing to the 10th century. Earlier 20th-century scholars frequently sought to place the text earlier into the 9th-century era of the Carolingian Empire, but sometimes invoking romantic grounds of admiration of the fine Latin style. Émile Amann suggested it was written by a contemporary of Charlemagne (c. 800), while Cyrille Lambot attributed it to the theologian Paschasius Radbertus in the 840s. (Note: Writing in 1934, Cyrille Lambot proposed that De Nativitate Mariae was composed by Paschasius Radbertus (c. 790–865), former abbot of Corbie Abbey, between 846 and 849. Lambot based his theory on Hincmar's letter and on a manuscript heading in Maredsous MS 51, which titled the prologue Prologus Hieronymi ad Eustochium, suggesting to him that Radbertus wrote under the pseudonym of Jerome and dedicated the work to Abbess Imma of Soissons under the pseudonym of Eustochium. However, Rita Beyers's subsequent manuscript studies have refuted Lambot's thesis. Beyers writes that the dedication to Eustochium is a secondary innovation confined to a late manuscript sub-branch (subgroup B1) rather than part of the original text. Textual comparisons also raise questions: Beyers argues that the Nativity of Mary lacks Radbertus's characteristic hesitation toward apocrypha, his distinctive theological phrasing regarding the nature of Mary's childbirth, and his personal Latin prose style.)

Rita Beyers suggests the work was likely created between 868–869 and the year 1000. Beyers proposed a terminus post quem based on a letter written in the late 860s by Archbishop Hincmar of Reims to Bishop Odo of Beauvais, in which Hincmar defended the public cathedral reading of an apocryphal account of Mary's nativity against criticisms raised by Ratramnus of Corbie. Evidence confirms that Hincmar's cathedral library possessed a copy of the Gospel of Pseudo-Matthew (Reims MS 1395, created c. 850). Beyers argues that if the sober and theologically sanitized De Nativitate Mariae had already existed, Hincmar would have preferred and championed it for cathedral reading rather than defending the cruder Pseudo-Matthew. His silence suggests to her the text probably did not yet exist in 868–869.

A terminus ante quem is provided by Bishop Fulbert of Chartres (d. 1028), who used the Nativity of Mary in a sermon for the feast of the Nativity of the Virgin. No 9th- or 10th-century manuscripts survive, and the earliest physical witnesses and ecclesiastical attestations date to the early 11th century. Due to this, Brandon Hawk suggests the emergence of the Nativity of Mary as an independent work probably happened between the years 900 and 1000. Margot Elsbeth Fassler has suggested that it seems plausible that Fulbert himself, or someone in his circle, was the creator of the work in the late 10th or early 11th century. Regardless of if he was involved in its composition, Fulbert seems to have played a key role in the work's spread via integrating it into the feast day for the Nativity of Mary and promoting its celebration.

== Content ==
The narrative consists of a preface followed by ten chapters. It contains the lineage and conception of Mary, her childhood in the Temple, her betrothal to Joseph, and the Annunciation.

=== Preface ===
The work begins with an epistolary preface addressed to an unnamed patron who requested the account. The author states that he is writing from memory and intends to preserve the sense of the history rather than a strict word-for-word rendering. To justify the narrative, the author adapts the pseudo-epigraphical fiction of Pseudo-Matthew: he claims that the text was originally written in Hebrew by the evangelist Matthew, kept secret to prevent misuse, and later translated into Latin by Saint Jerome to supplant the heretical versions circulated by the Manichaean "Seleucus" (Leucius Charinus).

=== Joachim and Anna (Chapters 1–5) ===
Joachim is described as of the tribe of Judah and from Nazareth, while Anna (Anne) is originally from Bethlehem and is of the Davidic line of descent. Though righteous, pious, and generous with their wealth, they endure twenty years of marriage without children. During the Feast of the Dedication, the high priest Issachar rebukes Joachim at the Temple and rejects his offering because the couple's childlessness is regarded as a sign of divine displeasure.

Grief-stricken, Joachim retreats into the mountains among his shepherds rather than return home in shame. After some time, an angel appears to him in brilliant light, reassuring him that his prayers have been heard. The angel cites the miraculous late births of Isaac, Samson, and Samuel, and announces that Anna will bear a daughter named Mary, who will be dedicated to God from infancy and will become the mother of the Savior. The angel instructs Joachim to return to Jerusalem and meet his wife at the Golden Gate. The angel simultaneously appears to Anna with the same promise. The spouses reunite at the Golden Gate, return home, and Anna conceives in natural fashion, but "without concupiscence." She gives birth to Mary, who is nursed and cared for at home for three years.

=== Dedication in the Temple and selection of Joseph (Chapters 6–8) ===
When Mary reaches three years of age, her parents bring her to the Temple in Jerusalem. Placed at the foot of the Temple stairs, the infant girl miraculously ascends all fifteen steps without assistance, astonishing the onlookers. Her parents return home, while Mary remains in the Temple, living a life of prayer, work, and daily angelic visitations.

When Mary turns fourteen, the high priest orders all young women of that age to return home to marry according to Jewish custom. Mary objects, stating that she has consecrated her virginity to God. Perplexed, the high priest consults the Lord in the Holy of Holies. A divine voice, fulfilling the prophecy of Isaiah 11:1–2, directs that all unmarried men of the house and family of David bring their rods to the altar; the man whose rod blossoms and upon which the Holy Spirit descends in the form of a dove is to be chosen as Mary's guardian and husband.

Joseph, an elderly man of the house of David, at first withholds his rod. When no sign appears, God tells the high priest that the man who has not brought his rod is the one chosen. Joseph's rod then miraculously sprouts a flower, and a dove descends upon it. Joseph accepts Mary as his wife. Mary returns to her family's house in Galilee accompanied by seven virgin companions assigned by the priests, while Joseph journeys to Bethlehem to prepare their home.

=== The Annunciation and Joseph's dream (Chapters 9–10) ===
The final chapters elaborate upon the canonical Annunciation accounts. The archangel Gabriel appears to Mary in her chamber, greeting her with the words: "Blessed are you above all women, blessed above all human beings born up to now." While Mary is used to conversing with angels, she is troubled by the unfamiliar words. Gabriel assures her that her choice of virginity has been preserved, and because of her virginity, she will conceive without sin a son who will have dominion over the Earth. Mary responds: "Behold the handmaid of the Lord, although I am not worthy of the name mother."

Three months later, Joseph returns from Judea to find Mary pregnant. Distressed and confused, but unwilling to expose her to public disgrace, he resolves to divorce her quietly. An angel appears to Joseph in a dream, confirming Mary's virginity and the divine conception. Joseph joyfully takes Mary into his home, honoring her perpetual virginity. The work ends with noting that she gave birth to the lord Jesus Christ "exactly as the Evangelists taught", perhaps as an attempt to bind itself to the canonical gospels and their authority.

== As an adaptation of Pseudo-Matthew ==
The Nativity of Mary is an abridgment of the Gospel of Pseudo-Matthew, reducing the text by more than half and suiting a more clerical sensibility. The author excised material, omitting the second half of Pseudo-Matthew (chapters 13–24), which contains the childhood miracles of Jesus during the Flight into Egypt, such as the taming of dragons and lions and the miracle of the palm tree. It also does not include the episodes adapted from the Infancy Gospel of Thomas (chapters 25–42).

The author also suppressed sensational and folkloric elements from the infancy narrative. These omitted scenes include Anna's dramatic lamentation under a laurel bush in the garden, the marriage proposal made by the priest Abiathar on behalf of his son, and the public trial where Joseph and Mary are forced to drink the bitter water of ordeal to prove their innocence. The characterization of Joseph was likewise transformed: whereas in Pseudo-Matthew he is portrayed as a protesting old man who complains of physical infirmities and fears public ridicule, the Nativity of Mary presents him as a mature, dignified patriarch who recognizes the divine will and accepts Mary without hesitation.

== Theology and biblical style ==
The primary theological aim of the Nativity of Mary was to reconcile the popular apocryphal traditions of Mary's early life with medieval theological orthodoxy, particularly the Augustinian Mariology that had been developed by Carolingian-era theologians. Following Augustinian teaching on original sin, the author emphasized that although Mary was conceived within a natural human marriage, both her conception and her subsequent bearing of Christ occurred without carnal lust (sine concupiscentia). Mary's conscious, proactive vow of virginity is highlighted as an ideal ascetic virtue, while the mutual consent of Joseph and Mary is presented as establishing a legally valid marriage that required no sexual consummation. An angel tells Anna that her daughter will live "without stain, without corruption, without intercourse with a man, as a virgin."

The work is also interested in angelology. Angels act as intermediaries between humans and God, such as the angel that tells Anna that he is in charge of bringing her prayers and offerings to God. It also emphasizes that Mary was not afraid of Gabriel, but is only troubled by his surprising message.

The work also adopts a more scriptural tone than earlier apocrypha. Chapters 9 and 10 function as an extended theological paraphrase and harmonization of the canonical Annunciation accounts in Luke 1 and Matthew 1. Biblical phrasing and Old Testament typologies—such as comparisons with the matriarchs Sarah and Rachel, who both had long-delayed yet divinely granted pregnancies—are woven throughout the text to anchor the narrative in scriptural tradition.

== Manuscripts and printed editions ==
=== Manuscript tradition ===
The work survives in more than 150 medieval manuscripts cataloged by Rita Beyers. She divided most of the manuscripts into two recensions, designated Form A and Form B. Form A represents the earlier and dominant textual tradition, encompassing the majority of surviving copies and subdivided into eight regional subgroups. Form B is a secondary branch consisting of two subgroups (B1 and B2); subgroup B1 includes some stylistic smoothing and introduces the altered superscription that attributed the prologue to Jerome writing to Eustochium. While the oldest surviving manuscripts are from the Form B families, this seems to be a quirk of preservation, and Form B likely was composed a little later than Form A. Beyers also listed 19 manuscripts as classified in neither family; they had forms which were still recognizably the Nativity of Mary but were adapted, composited, or excerpted in unique ways.

The surviving manuscripts also give an idea of the geographical spread of the work and where it was most popular. They have been found in France, Portugal, England, Belgium, Luxembourg, Germany, Austria, Switzerland, and Italy.

The oldest known witness was an 11th century manuscript, MS 130, preserved in the municipal library of Chartres. It contained the sermon of Fulbert of Chartres alongside the text. This manuscript was destroyed during the May 1944 Chartres Municipal Library Fire after the city was bombed during World War II.

=== Printed editions ===
Because the text was long attributed to Saint Jerome, De Nativitate Mariae was circulated in print well before modern apocryphal scholarship began. It was included in at least twelve incunabula editions of Jerome's collected letters and treatises published between 1468 and 1497, beginning with Giovanni Andrea Bussi's 1468 Rome edition. It was subsequently included in the standard Renaissance and Early Modern collected editions of Jerome edited by Erasmus (Basel, 1516), Mariano Vittori (Rome, 1566–1572), Jean Martianay (Paris, 1693–1706), and Domenico Vallarsi (Verona, 1734–1742).

Scholarly interest in the text as an apocryphon began in the 18th century. Johann Albert Fabricius published it in 1703, placing it in the first volume of his work Codex Apocryphus Novi Testamenti. Further critical editions were produced in the 19th century by Johann Karl Thilo in 1832 and Constantin von Tischendorf in his influential Evangelia Apocrypha in 1853 (second edition 1876). Rita Beyers published a critical edition based on all known manuscript witnesses in 1997.

== Influence and liturgical reception ==
Owing to its refined Latin style and theological propriety, De Nativitate Mariae was accepted in some places where more sensational apocrypha were condemned. It was widely incorporated into the Divine Office and monastic readings for the Feast of the Nativity of the Blessed Virgin Mary (September 8) and the Feast of the Conception of Mary (December 8). Marian devotion grew in intensity and popularity from the 12th century onward in Western Christianity, becoming a staple of the later Middle Ages, and the work's popularity was intertwined with this. The 12th century also appears to be when the most manuscripts of the Nativity of Mary were produced.

In the 13th century, the influence of the work continued, albeit more indirectly. Large extracts of the text were incorporated into Vincent of Beauvais's encyclopedia Speculum Historiale and Jacobus de Voragine's popular hagiographical collection, the Golden Legend. Through these works, the Nativity of Mary became one of the most influential narrative sources for Western late medieval Christian iconography, mystery plays, and artistic representations of the lives of Joachim, Anna, and the young Virgin Mary.

== Translations ==
Selected translations into English of the Nativity of Mary include:

- Cowper, Benjamin. H. (1874) [1867]. The Apocryphal Gospels and other documents relating to the History of Christ . Frederic Norgate. pp. 84–98 – via Wikisource.
- Hawk, Brandon W. (2019). The Gospel of Pseudo-Matthew and the Nativity of Mary. Westar Tools and Translations 8. Cascade Books. pp. 126–141. ISBN 978-1-5326-3715-5.

== Bibliography ==
- Beyers, Rita (1997). Libri de Nativitate Mariae: Libellus de Natiuitate sanctae Mariae. Corpus Christianorum Series Apocryphorum 10 (in French). Brepols. ISBN 978-2-503-41101-9.
- Hawk, Brandon W. (2019). The Gospel of Pseudo-Matthew and the Nativity of Mary. Westar Tools and Translations 8. Cascade Books. ISBN 978-1-5326-3715-5.
