= Memoria Apostolorum =

One of the lost texts from the New Testament apocrypha

Memoria Apostolorum, which means (in) memory of the apostles, is one of the lost texts from the New Testament apocrypha.

A reference to the Memoria Apostolorum appears in a letter, dated about 440, from Turibius of Astorga to Hydatius and Ceponius.

Given the name, it may be one of the texts which are already known, and for which we have some of the content, such as the Gospel of the Twelve, or one of the apocryphal Acts, or Apocalypses.
