= On the Life and the Passion of Christ =

On the Life and the Passion of Christ (CPC 0113) is an apocryphal account of Jesus written in Sahidic. According to its written introduction, it is "a homily which the holy Apa Cyril [...] delivered", meaning Cyril of Jerusalem. Scholars, however, assume the homily to be a Pseudo-Cyrillian work. It is dated no earlier than the 8th century AD and, according to the introduction, was delivered "in the early morning of the fourth day of the Great Pascha", making it an Easter homily focusing mostly on the passion of Christ.

== Manuscripts ==
The homily can be found in its entirety in manuscript M610 of the Pierpont Morgan Library found in the Coptic Monastery of Saint Michael in Egypt in 1910, and in part as a palimpsest in manuscript E 16262 of the Museum of the University of Pennsylvania.

== Content ==
Pseudo-Cyril claims his sources to be "the writings of our fathers, the apostles", most prominently the "Constitutions of the Apostles" (possibly referring to "Apostolic Constitutions"), found in the house of Mary, the mother of Mark, and read to Pseudo-Cyril by a priest named Bachius.

Some interesting elements and claims of the homily which elaborate on or deviate from the traditional gospel narrative are:

- The Jews' motive for killing Jesus was that his followers ceased going to the temple and paying tithes.
- Nicodemus and Joseph of Arimathea defended Jesus in front of the Sanhedrin.
- Nicodemus was baptized by Jesus
- Judas' betrayal was incited by his wife.
- Judas had to point out Jesus because the latter could and did miraculously change his appearance.
- Jesus curses Judas and his wife upon his arrest and predicts their deaths.
- Pilate and Jesus share a meal and the former offers to sacrifice the life of his own son in exchange for Jesus', which Jesus declines.
- Jesus demonstrates his divinity by turning invisible in front of Pilate, who faints.
- Jesus is apparently accommodated by Pilate in the latter's own house.
- A dream of Pilate's is recounted in which an eagle from heaven (a symbol for Jesus) is crucified, revives and flies up to heaven again, among other things. Jesus interprets Pilate's dream for him as his passion, resurrection and the subsequent spread of the Gospel.
- Pilate's wife, named Procla, has a dream in which an eagle gives her a warning.
- Jesus predicts the death of Pilate and his wife.

Pseudo-Cyril ends his homily with a promise to deliver another on the death and resurrection of Jesus at a later time.
