= Pseudo-Cyril =

Pseudo-Cyril is a designation used by scholars for the unknown authors whose works are, deliberately or accidentally, misattributed to Cyril of Jerusalem or Cyril of Alexandria. Such works include:

- Pseudo-Cyril of Jerusalem
  - On the Life and the Passion of Christ (Coptic)
  - Homily on the Resurrection and the Passion (Coptic and Ethiopic)
  - Homily on the Virgin Mary and Her Birth (Coptic), which makes reference to the Gospel of the Hebrews
  - Homily on the Life of the Virgin (Coptic and Arabic)
  - Miracles of Mary in Bartos (Coptic and Arabic)
  - Homily on the Entry of the Virgin into the Temple
  - Homily on the Dormition and Assumption of the Virgin (Arabic)
  - Homily on the Assumption of the Virgin (Ethiopic and Arabic)
  - Homily on the Honor of the Virgin (Coptic)
  - Encomium on Mary Magdalene (Coptic)
- Pseudo-Cyril of Alexandria
  - Homily on the Dormition of the Virgin (Arabic)
  - Homily on the Assumption of the Virgin (Arabic)
  - De exitu animi (Greek)
  - De Sacrosancta Trinitate (Greek), actually by Joseph the Philosopher
  - Apocalypse Commentary (Coptic)
