= Zechariah, father of John the Baptist =

Father of John the Baptist

Zechariah
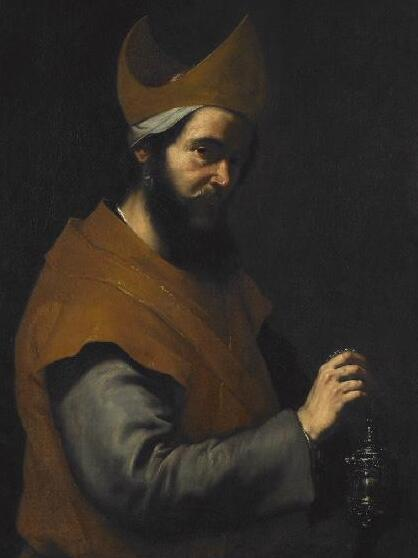
- Saint Zechariah by Jusepe de Ribera, 1634

Personal life
- Born: 1st century BC
- Died: 1st century BC (or early 1st century AD) Jerusalem (Matthew 23:35), the Levant
- Spouse: Elizabeth
- Children: John the Baptist

Religious life
- Religion: Abrahamic religions
Zechariah
Priest, Prophet, Guardian of Mary, Devotee, Martyr
- Venerated in: Catholic Church; Eastern Orthodox Church; Oriental Orthodox Church; Anglicanism; Lutheranism; Islam
- Canonized: Pre-Congregation
- Feast: September 5 – Eastern Orthodox; September 5 – Lutheran; September 23 – Roman Catholic

Zechariah (Note: Hebrew: זְכַרְיָה, romanized: Zəḵaryā, lit. 'remember Yah'; Greek: Ζαχαρίας; Zacharias (KJV); Zachary (DRV); Arabic: زكريا, romanized: Zakariyyā) was a Jewish priest mentioned in the New Testament and as a prophet in the Quran, and venerated in Christianity and Islam. In the Bible, he is a priest of the sons of Aaron in the Gospel of Luke (Luke 1:67–79), and notably the father of John the Baptist and the husband of Elizabeth, who is a relative of Mary, mother of Jesus (Luke 1:36). In the Quran, his story is mentioned in the initial verse of surah Maryam (chapter Mary).

== Biblical account ==
According to the Gospel of Luke, during the reign of King Herod, there was a priest named Zechariah, of the course of Abia, whose wife Elizabeth was also of the priestly family of Aaron. The evangelist states that both the parents were righteous before God, since they were "blameless" in observing the commandments and ordinances of the Lord. When the events related in Luke began, their marriage was still childless, because Elizabeth was "barren", and they were both "well advanced in years" (Luke 1:5–7).

The duties at the temple in Jerusalem alternated between each of the family lines that had descended from those appointed by King David (1 Chronicles 24:1–19). Luke states that during the week when it was the duty of Zechariah's family line to serve at "the temple of the Lord", the lot for performing the incense offering had fallen to Zechariah (Luke 1:8–11).

The Gospel of Luke states that while Zechariah ministered at the altar of incense, an angel of the Lord appeared and announced to him that his wife would give birth to a son, whom he was to name John, and that this son would be the forerunner of the Lord (Luke 1:12–17). Citing their advanced age, Zechariah asked with disbelief for a sign whereby he would know the truth of this prophecy. In reply, the angel identified himself as Gabriel, sent especially by God to make this announcement, and added that because of Zechariah's doubt he would be struck dumb and "not able to speak, until the day that these things shall be performed". Consequently, when he went out to the waiting worshippers in the temple's outer courts, he was unable to speak the customary blessing (Luke 1:18–22). The time this occurred, according to theologian Adam C. English, "is September 24, based on computations from the Jewish calendar in accordance with Leviticus 23 regarding the Day of Atonement."

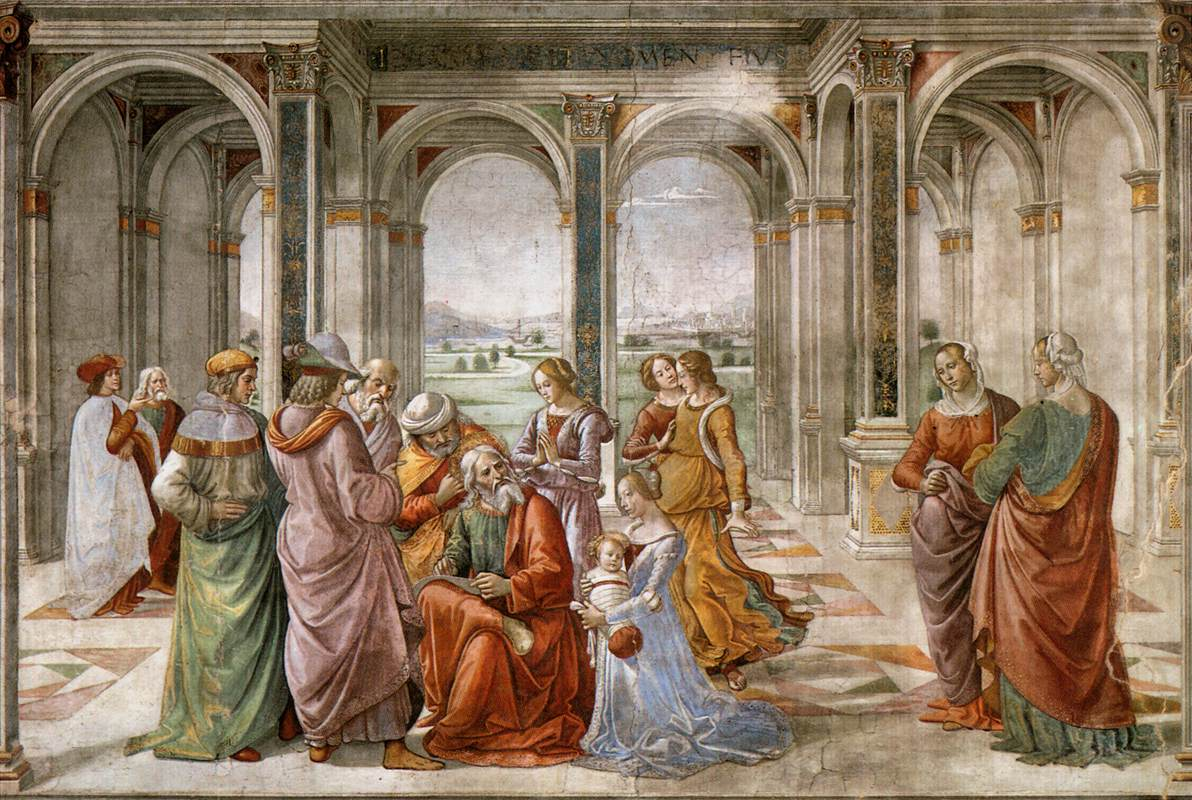
Domenico Ghirlandaio's fresco Zechariah Writes Down the Name of His Son (1490, fresco in the Tornabuoni Chapel, Florence)

After returning to his house in "Hebron, in the hill country of Judah", his wife Elizabeth conceived. After Elizabeth completed her fifth month of pregnancy, her relative Mary was visited by the same angel, Gabriel. While still a virgin, Gabriel said to her, "Do not be afraid, Mary; you have found favor with God. You will conceive and give birth to a son, and you are to call him Jesus. 'How will this be,' Mary asked the angel, 'since I am a virgin?' The angel answered, 'The Holy Spirit will come on you, and the power of the Most High will overshadow you. So the holy one to be born will be called the Son of God.'"

Mary then traveled to visit her relative Elizabeth, having been told by the angel that Elizabeth was in her sixth month of pregnancy. Mary remained about three months before she returned to her own house (Luke 1:23–45;56).

Elizabeth gave birth, and on the eighth day, when their son was to be circumcised according to the commandment, her neighbours and relatives assumed that he was to be named after his father. Elizabeth, however, insisted that his name was to be John; so the family then questioned her husband. As soon as Zechariah had written on a writing table: "His name is John", he regained the power of speech, and blessed "the Lord God of Israel" with a prophecy known as the Benedictus or "Song of Zechariah" (Luke 1:57–79).

The child grew up and "waxed strong in spirit", but remained in the deserts of Judæa until he assumed the ministry that was to earn him the name "John the Baptist" (Luke 1:80; 3:2–3; Matthew 3:1).

== Other Christian traditions ==
=== Identification with Zechariah from Matthew ===
Origen suggested that the Zechariah mentioned in Matthew 23:35 as having been killed between the temple and the altar may be the father of John the Baptist.

=== Death ===
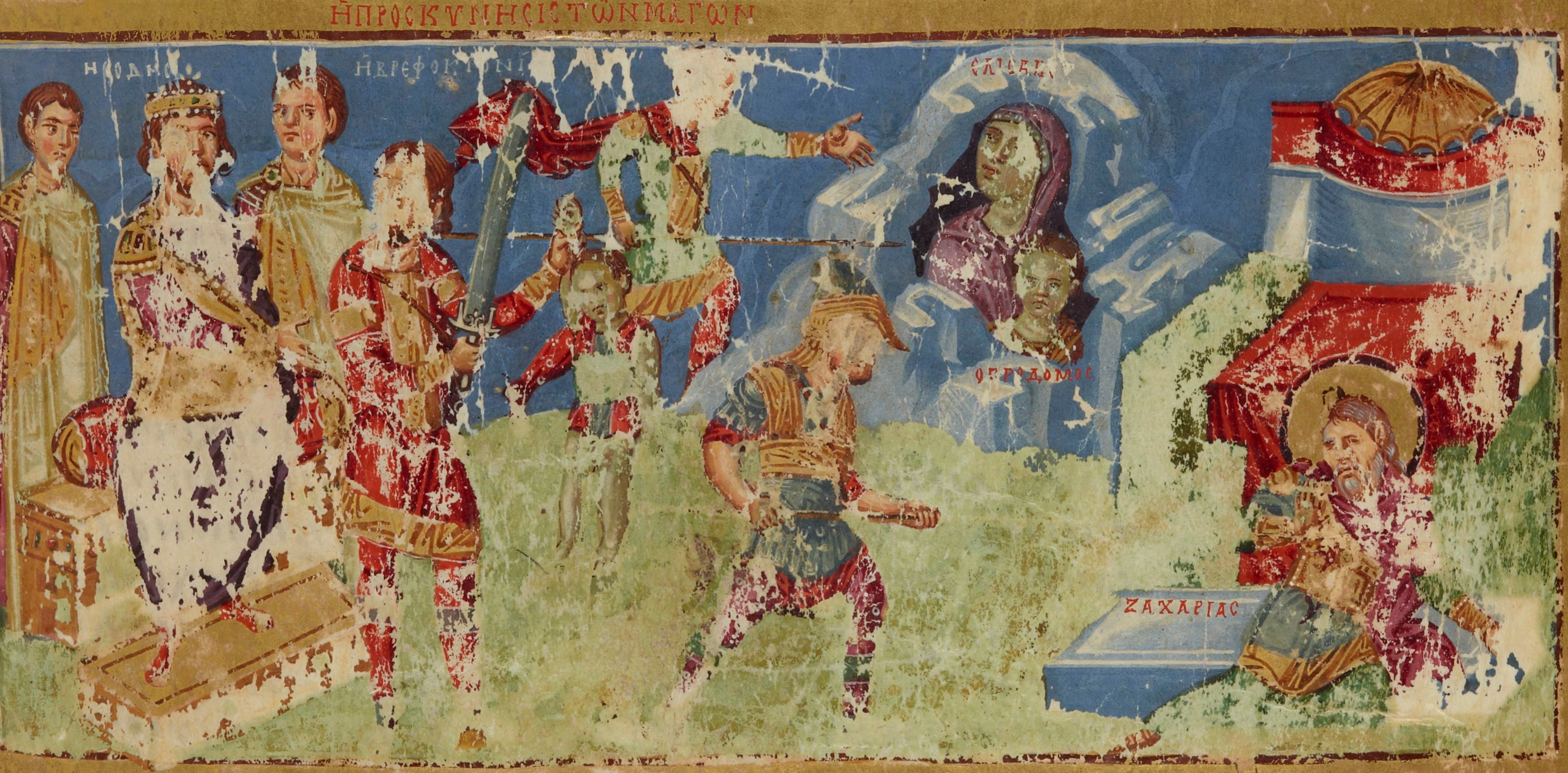
The martyrdom of Zachariah in the Temple during the Massacre of the Innocents; and the Flight of Elizabeth, as depicted in a miniature from the Paris Gregory, a 9th-century manuscript codex

The Gospel of James, a 2nd-century apocryphal work, recounts that, at the time of the massacre of the Innocents, when King Herod ordered the slaughter of all males under the age of two in an attempt to prevent the prophesied Messiah from coming to Israel, Zechariah refused to divulge the whereabouts of his son, who was in hiding, and he was therefore murdered by Herod's soldiers. This account is also present in subsequent Eastern Orthodox tradition.

=== Commemoration ===
The Catholic Church commemorates him as a saint, along with Elizabeth, on September 23 as it is believed that his temple duty before John the Baptist's conception took place on the Day of Atonement. He is also venerated as a prophet in the Calendar of Saints of the Lutheran Church on 5 September. The Armenian Apostolic Church venerates him on September 5th as well, along with his wife Elizabeth. The Eastern Orthodox Church also celebrates the feast day of Zechariah on September 5, together with Elizabeth, who is considered a matriarch. Zechariah and Elizabeth are invoked in several prayers during the Orthodox Mystery of Crowning (Sacrament of Marriage), as the priest blesses the newly married couple, saying "Thou who didst... accept Zechariah and Elizabeth, and didst make their offspring the Forerunner..." and "...bless them, O Lord our God, as Thou didst Zechariah and Elizabeth...". In the Greek Orthodox calendar, Zechariah and Elizabeth are also commemorated on June 24.

=== Relics veneration ===
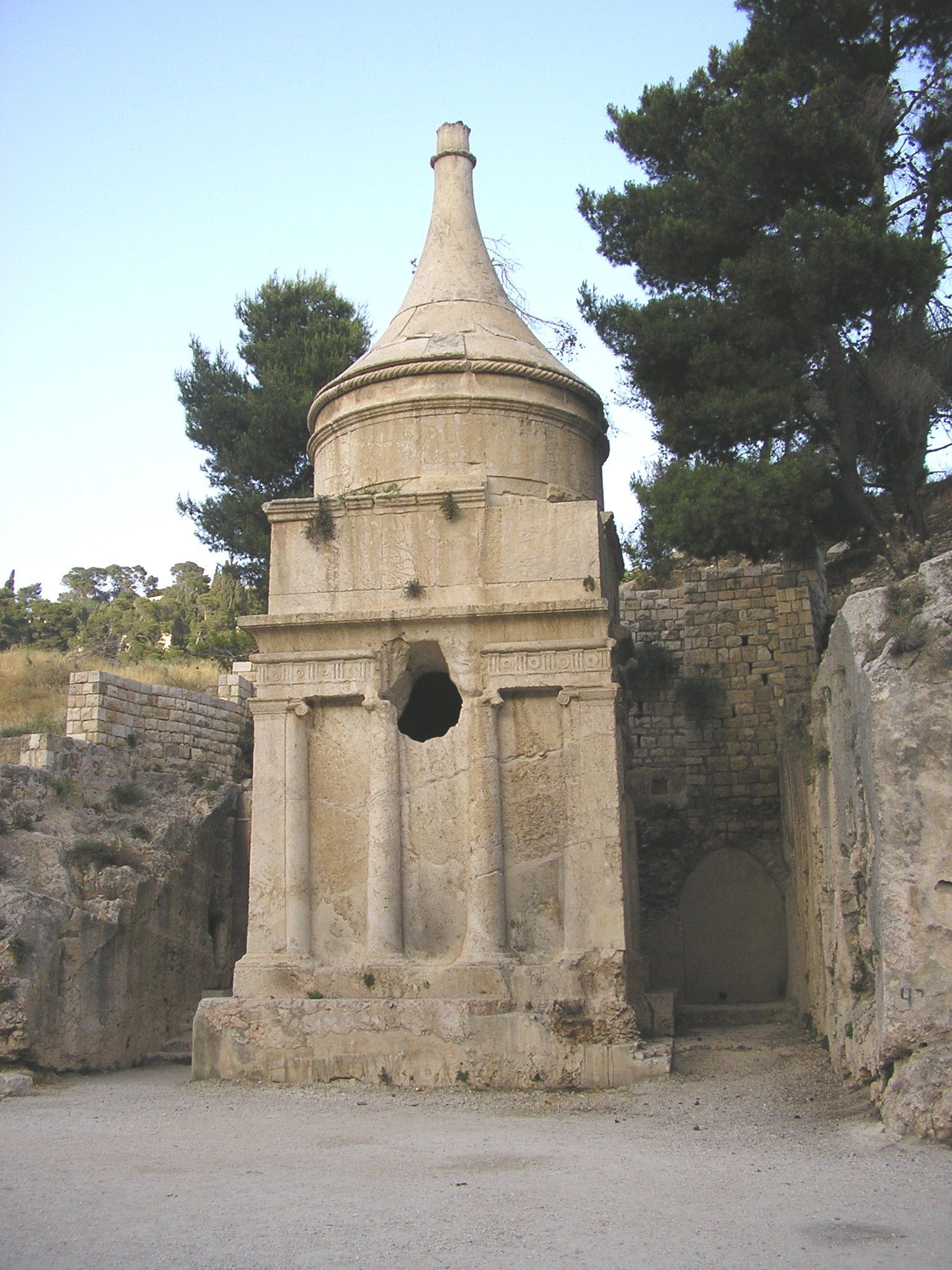
The Tomb of Absalom, built in the 1st century CE in the Kidron Valley; an inscription added three centuries later claims that it is Zechariah's tomb.

San Zaccaria, Venice claims to house the relics of Zechariah, entombed alongside those of Athanasius of Alexandria. Armenians believe that the Gandzasar monastery in Nagorno-Karabakh contains his relics; however, his relics were also kept in the Hagia Sophia of Constantinople, where they were brought by the præfectus urbi Ursus on 4 September, 415.

His relics' uncovering is commemorated by Greek Orthodox Church on 11 February. Commemoration of his, James and Simeon relics' translation in 351 occurs on 1 December, and 25 May is the commemoration of their relics' discovery in 351.

=== Tomb venerated in Byzantine period ===
In 2003, a 4th-century inscription on the so-called Tomb of Absalom, a 1st-century monument in Jerusalem, was deciphered as, "This is the tomb of Zachariah, the martyr, the holy priest, the father of John." This suggests to some scholars that it is the burial place of Zechariah the father of John the Baptist. Professor Gideon Foerster at the Hebrew University states that the inscription tallies with a 6th-century Christian text by a pilgrim named Theodosius which states that Zechariah was buried with Simon the Elder and James the brother of Jesus, and believes that both are authentic. Zias and Puech suggest the inscription may refer to another 'Zekariah' mentioned by Josephus and the Talmud who was martyred in the time of Vespasian. They also suggest the inscription casts doubt on the tomb being Absalom's. Although it was referred to as such in the 1st century, Absalom had lived centuries earlier.

== In Islam ==
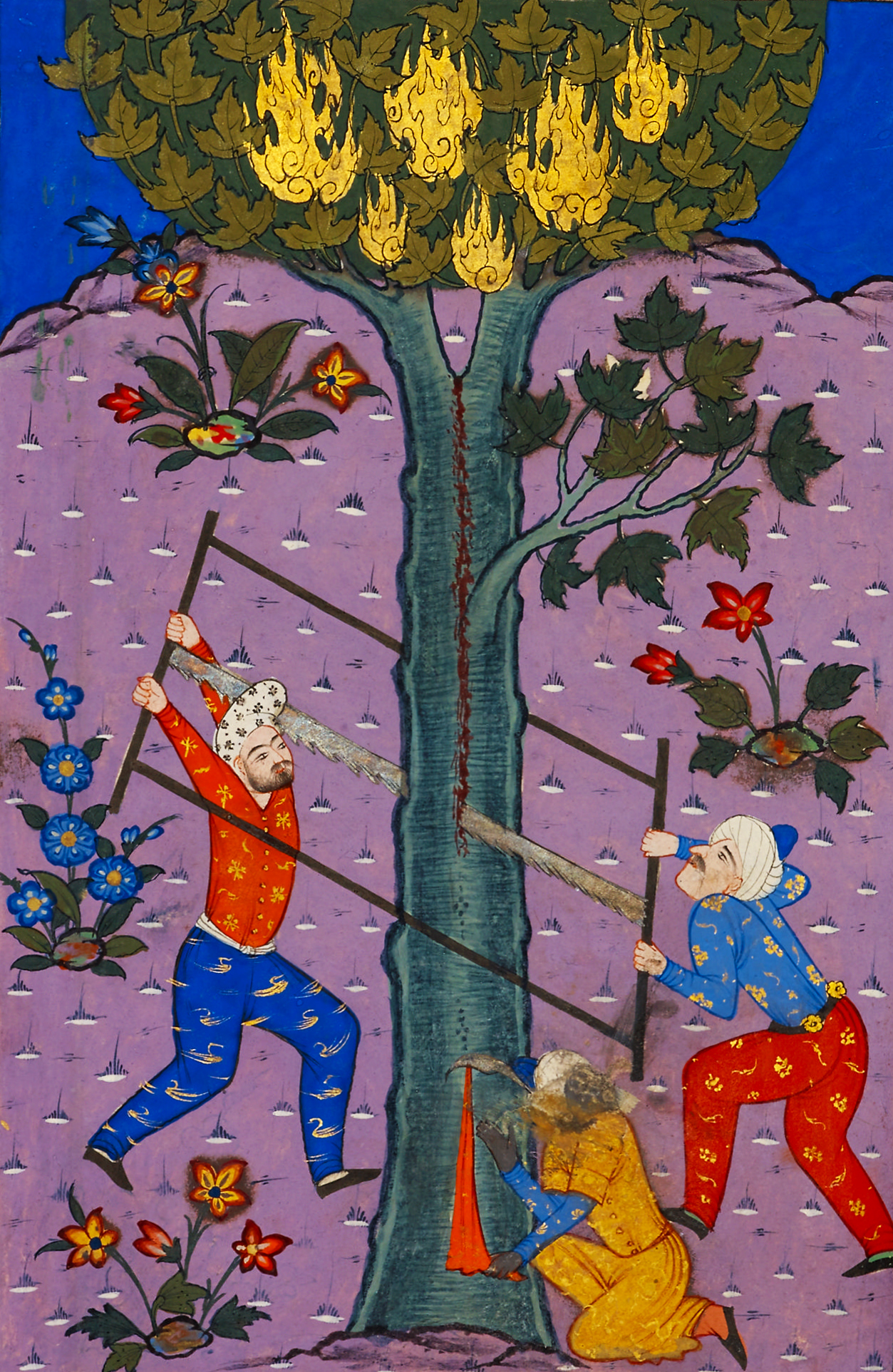
Zakariyya sawn in half after Iblis revealed the lappet of his garments peaking out from his hiding place.

Zechariah is also a prophet in Islam, and is mentioned in the Qur'an as the father of Yaḥyā (John the Baptist). Zechariah is also believed by some Muslims to have been a martyr. An old tradition narrates that Zechariah was sawn in half, in a death which resembles that attributed to Isaiah in Lives of the Prophets.

=== The Night of Zechariah ===
The Night of Zechariah is a festive night celebrated in Iraq by Muslims, Christians, and Mandaeans. It is associated with the story of Zechariah's miraculous birth of John. Celebrated on the first Sunday evening of the Islamic month of Sha'ban, the festive night revolves around unmarried Iraqi women who wish to give birth to children, specifically a son. The festive night, alongside its practices and rituals, isn't isolated to one sect but is practiced by all Abrahamic religions in Iraq.

== Unification Church ==
Unificationist theologian Young Oon Kim wrote, and some members of the Unification movement believe, that Zechariah was the father of Jesus, based on the work of Leslie Weatherhead, an English Christian theologian in the liberal Protestant tradition.

== See also ==
- Nativity of John the Baptist
- Prophets in Christianity
- List of early Christian saints
- Biblical narratives and the Qur'an
- Qisas Al-Anbiya (Stories of the Prophets in Islam)

== Notes ==
Zechariah, father of John the Baptist Life of Jesus: Conception of Jesus
Preceded by Renovating the Second Temple into Herod's Temple begins	New Testament; Events	Succeeded by Gabriel announces to Mary that she will give birth to Jesus
