= Gospel of James =

Pseudepigraphic gospel

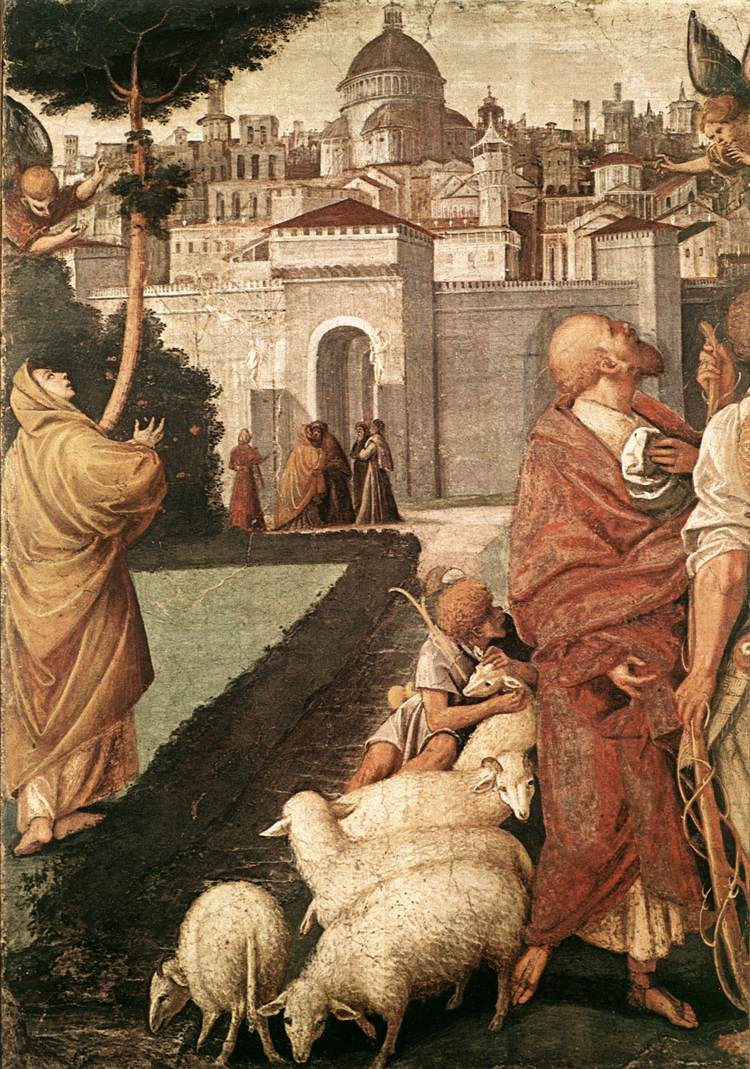
Annunciation to Joachim and Anna, fresco by Gaudenzio Ferrari, 1544–45 (detail)

The Gospel of James (or the Protoevangelium of James) (Note: The original title was "The Birth of Mary"; it has many names, including the "Infancy Gospel of James", the "Story of the Birth of Saint Mary, Mother of God", and "The Birth of Mary, The Revelation of James".) is a second-century infancy gospel telling of the miraculous conception of Mary, the mother of Jesus, her upbringing and marriage to Joseph, the journey of the couple to Bethlehem, the birth of Jesus, and events immediately following. It is the earliest surviving assertion of the perpetual virginity of Mary, meaning her virginity not just prior to the birth of Jesus, but during and afterwards, and despite being condemned by Pope Innocent I in 405 and classified as apocryphal by the Gelasian Decree around AD 500, became a widely influential source for Mariology.

== Composition ==
=== Dating ===
The Gospel of James was well known to Origen in the early third century and probably to Clement of Alexandria at the end of the second, so is assumed to have been in circulation soon after circa 150 AD. The earliest manuscript of the text (Papyrus Bodmer 5) dates to the third or fourth century.

The author claims to be James the brother of Jesus by an earlier marriage of Joseph, but his identity is unknown.

=== Historical context ===
Early family studies assumed a Jewish milieu, largely because of its frequent use and knowledge of the Septuagint (a Greek translation of the Jewish scriptures); further investigation demonstrated that it misunderstands and/or misrepresents many Jewish practices, but Judaism at this time was highly diverse, and recent trends in scholarship do not entirely dismiss a Jewish connection. In fact, it has been argued that Mary’s temple service reflects real practices allowing women such access, such as accused adulteresses, veil-weavers, and Nazirites. The “weavers of the veil,” known from Jewish sources like the Apocalypse of Baruch (“the virgins who spin fine linen”), were virgin girls, matching Mary’s role in the text. There is Scriptural evidence of young women working at the tabernacle and each of the temples (1 Samuel 2:22, Exodus 38:8, Ezra 2:65), certainly living nearby if not on premises. It is likely that they were unmarried.

Its origin is probably Syrian, and it possibly derives from a sect called the Encratites, whose founder, Tatian, taught that sex and marriage were symptoms of original sin.

=== Sources ===
The gospel is a midrash (an elaboration) on the birth narratives found in the gospels of Matthew and Luke, and many of its elements, notably its very physical description of Mary's pregnancy and the examination of her hymen by the midwife Salome, suggest strongly that it was attempting to deny the arguments of docetists, Christians who held that Jesus was entirely supernatural. It also draws heavily on the Septuagint for historical analogies, turns of phrase, and details of Jewish life. Ronald Hock and Mary F. Foskett have drawn attention to the influence of Greco-Roman literature on its themes of virginity and purity.

=== Manuscripts ===
Scholars generally accept that the Gospel of James was originally composed in Greek. Over 100 Greek manuscripts have survived, and translations were made into Syriac, Ethiopic, Sahidic Coptic, Georgian, Old Church Slavonic, Armenian, Arabic, and presumably Latin, given that it was apparently known to the compiler of the Gelasian Decree. The oldest is Papyrus Bodmer 5 from the fourth or possibly third century, discovered in 1952 and now in the Bodmer Library, Geneva, while the fullest is a 10th-century Greek codex in the Bibliothèque Nationale, Paris.

=== Print editions ===
The first widely printed edition (as opposed to hand-copied manuscripts) was a 1552 edition printed in Basel, Switzerland, by Guillaume Postel, who printed his Latin translation of a Greek version of the work. Postel also gave the work the Latin name Protevangelion Jacobi (Proto-Gospel of James) because he believed (incorrectly) that the work antedated the main gospels of the New Testament (proto- for first, evangelion for gospel). Emile de Stryker published the standard modern critical edition in 1961, and in 1995 Ronald Hock published an English translation based on de Stryker.

== Structure and content ==
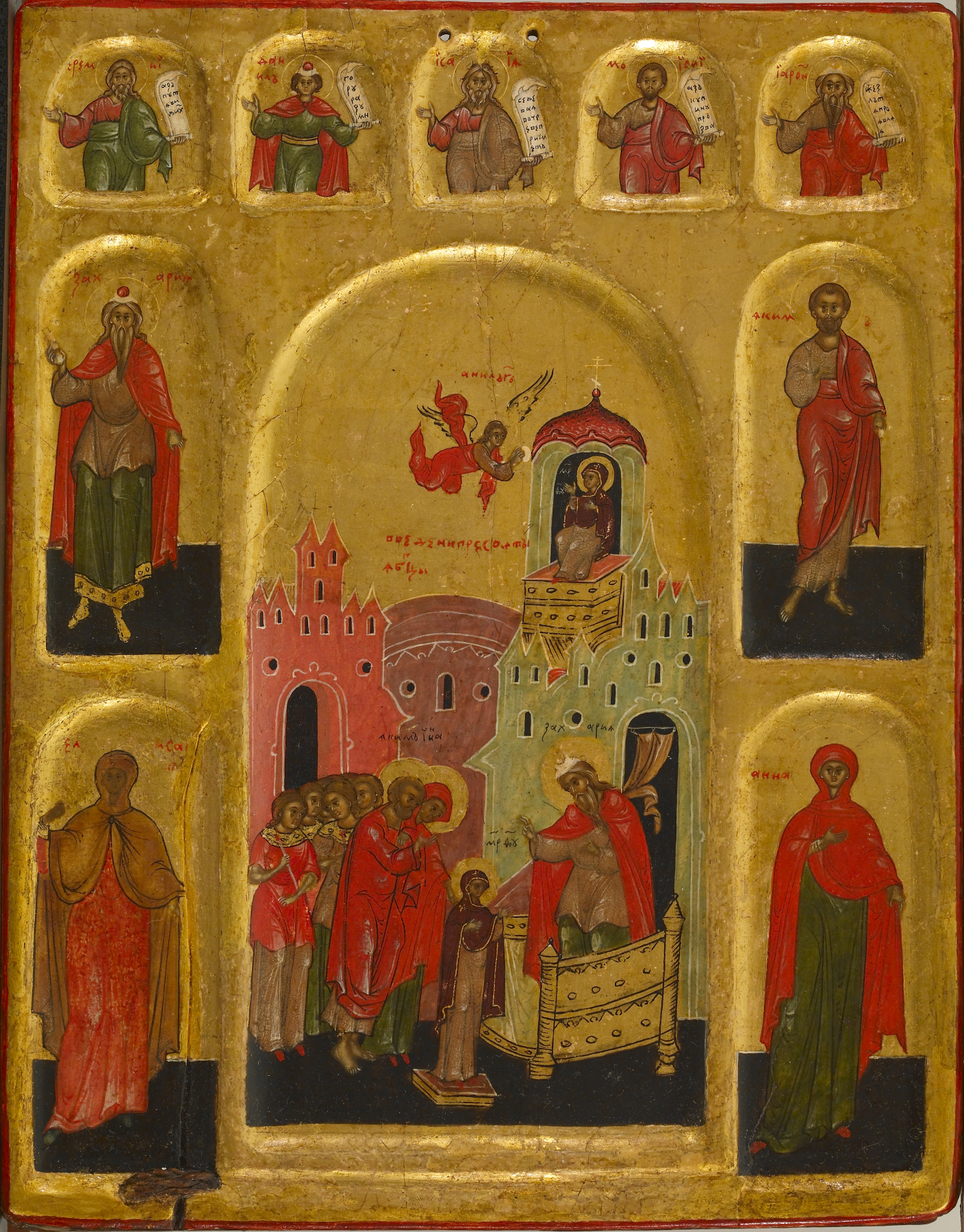
The Presentation of the Virgin in the Temple, an event that only appears in the Gospel of James, depicted on a Russian icon

The narrative is made up of three distinct sections with only slight ties to each other:

1. Chapters 1–17: A biography of Mary, dealing with her miraculous birth and holy infancy and childhood, her engagement to Joseph and virginal conception of Jesus
2. Chapters 18–21: The birth of Jesus, including proof that Mary continued to be a virgin even after the birth
3. Chapters 22–24: The death of Zechariah, father of John the Baptist

Mary is presented as an extraordinary child destined for great things from the moment of her conception. Her parents, the wealthy Joachim and his wife Anna (or Anne), are distressed that they have no children, and Joachim goes into the wilderness to pray, leaving Anna to lament her childless state. God hears Anna's prayer, angels announce the coming child, and in the seventh month of Anna's pregnancy (underlining the exceptional nature of Mary's future life), she is born. Anna dedicates the child to God and vows that she shall be raised in the Temple. Joachim and Anna name the child Mary, and when she is three years old, they send her to the Temple, where she is fed each day by an angel.

When Mary approaches her 12th year, the priests decide that she can no longer stay in the Temple lest her menstrual blood render it unclean, and God finds a widower, Joseph, to act as her guardian: Joseph is depicted as elderly and the father of grown sons; he has no desire for sexual relations with Mary. He leaves on business, and Mary is called to the Temple to help weave the temple curtain. One day while Mary is spinning thread for the curtain, the angel Gabriel appears and tells her that she has been chosen to conceive Jesus the Saviour, but that she will not give birth as other women do. Joseph returns and finds Mary six months pregnant, and rebukes her, fearing that the priests will assume that he is the guilty party. They do, but the chastity of both is proven through the "test of bitter waters".

The Roman census forces the holy couple to travel to Bethlehem, but Mary's time comes before they can reach the village. Joseph settles Mary in a cave, where she is guarded by his sons, while he goes in search of a midwife, and for an apocalyptic moment as he searches all creation stands still. He returns with a midwife, and as they stand at the mouth of the cave, a cloud overshadows it, an intense light fills it, and suddenly a baby is at Mary's breast. Joseph and the midwife marvel at the miracle, but a second midwife named Salome (the first is not given a name) insists on examining Mary, upon which her hand withers as a sign of her lack of faith; Salome prays to God for forgiveness and an angel appears and tells her to touch the Christ Child, upon which her hand is healed.

The gospel concludes with the visit of the Three Magi, the Massacre of the Innocents in Bethlehem, the martyrdom of the High Priest Zechariah (father of John the Baptist), the election of his successor Simeon, and an epilogue telling the circumstances under which the work was supposedly composed.

== Influence ==
=== Christianity ===
The Gospel of James was a widely influential source for Christian doctrine regarding Mary. According to Bernhard Lohse, it is the earliest assertion of her perpetual virginity, meaning her virginity not just prior to the birth of Jesus, but during the birth and afterwards. Its explanation of the gospels' "brothers of Jesus" (the adelphoi) as the offspring of Joseph by an earlier marriage remains the position of the Eastern church. Richard Bauckham noted that "It is possible that the brothers of Jesus were correctly remembered not to have been sons of Mary and that this made possible the development of the idea of Mary's perpetual virginity as a result. Good historical tradition certainly was still available in the early second century, even if mixed with much legendary material." In the West, influential theologian Jerome asserted that Joseph himself had been a perpetual virgin, and that the adelphoi were cousins of the Lord. Jerome's opposition to the Protevangelium led to a diminished influence and circulation in the western, Latin church. It was condemned by Pope Innocent I in 405 and rejected by the Gelasian Decree around 500. It was completely unknown in the West, and it was taken over by the widely read Gospel of Pseudo-Matthew, which popularized most of its stories.

The Gospel of James was the first to give the name Anne to the mother of Mary, taking it probably from Hannah, the mother of the prophet Samuel, and Mary, like Samuel, is taken to spend her childhood in the temple.

Various manuscripts place the birth of Mary in the sixth, seventh, eighth, or ninth month, with the oldest having the seventh; this was in keeping with both the Judaism of the period, which had similar seventh-month births for significant individuals such as Samuel, Isaac, and Moses, as the sign of a miraculous or divine conception. Further signs of Mary's supremely holy nature follow, including Anne's vow that the infant would never walk on the earth (her bedroom is made a "sanctuary" where she is attended by "undefiled daughters of the Hebrews"), her blessing "with the ultimate blessing" by the priests on her first birthday with the declaration that because of her God will bring redemption to Israel, and the angels who bring her food in the Temple, where she is attended by the priests and engages herself in weaving the temple curtain.

The ordeal of the bitter water serves to defend Jesus against accusation of illegitimacy levied in the second century by pagan and Jewish opponents of Christianity. Christian sensitivity to these charges made them eager to defend both the virgin birth of Jesus and the immaculate conception of Mary (i.e., her freedom from sin at the moment of her conception).

The Gospel of James influenced art for centuries being the source for various depictions of figures and scenes mentioned in the text.

=== Islam ===
The Quranic stories of the Virgin Mary and the birth of Jesus are similar to those of the Protoevangelium, which was widely known in the Near East. These include its mention of Mary fed by angels, the choice of her guardian (Joseph) through the casting of lots, and her occupation making a curtain for the Temple immediately before the Annunciation. Nevertheless, while the Quran holds Mary in high esteem and modern Muslims agree with Christians that she was a virgin when she conceived Jesus, some modern Muslims would see the idea of her perpetual virginity (which is the central idea of James) as contrary to the Islamic ideal of women as wives and mothers.

== See also ==
- Acts of the Apostles (genre)
- Apocalyptic literature
- Castelseprio – early fresco depiction of the trial by water
- Gospel
- History of Joseph the Carpenter
- List of Gospels
- List of New Testament papyri
- New Testament apocrypha
- Pseudepigraphy
- Perpetual virginity of Mary
- Salome (Gospel of James)
- Meeting of Joachim and Anne at the Golden Gate
- Church of the Seat of Mary aka Church of the Kathisma (Ecclesia Kathismatis) or Old Kathisma, between Jerusalem and Bethlehem; based on this gospel
