= Fifth Gospel =

Fifth Gospel can refer to:

- one of several real Christian gospels, see List of Gospels
- The Fifth Gospel, a 1993 German book by Philipp Vandenberg
- fifth gospel (genre), a literary genre
