= Agrapha =

Sayings of Jesus not found in the canonical Gospels

Agrapha (ἄγραφον; Greek for "non written"; singular ágraphon) are sayings of Jesus that are not found in the canonical Gospels. The term was used for the first time by J.G. Körner, a German Bible scholar, in 1776.

== Definition of agrapha ==
According to A. J. Maas, supposed agrapha must satisfy three conditions:

- They must be sayings, not discourses – works like the "Didascalia" and the "Pistis Sophia", that speak of Jesus, but do not quote him, are not considered agrapha
- They must be sayings of Jesus – agrapha are not sayings found in religious romances such as those found in apocryphal Gospels, the apocryphal Acts, or the Letter of Christ to Abgar, etc.
- They must not be in the canonical Gospels

Mere additions to pre-existing sayings are not considered agrapha.

== Examples ==
According to A. J. Maas, for agrapha to be genuine, they must be supported by external and internal evidence. This means that early writers, like Papias, Clement, Irenaeus, and Justin Martyr would have quoted them, and the message of the agrapha must not conflict with the teachings of Jesus contained in the canonical Gospels.

=== New Testament ===
- Acts 20:35: "Remember the word of the Lord Jesus, how he said: It is a more blessed thing to give, rather than to receive."

=== Church Orders ===
- Apostolic Church Order, 26: "For he said to us before, when he was teaching: That which is weak shall be saved through that which is strong."

=== Patristic citations ===
- Clement of Rome, First Epistle of Clement, 13: "For thus He spoke: 'Be ye merciful, that ye may obtain mercy; forgive, that it may be forgiven to you; as ye do, so shall it be done unto you; as ye judge, so shall ye be judged; as ye are kind, so shall kindness be shown to you; with what measure ye mete, with the same it shall be measured to you.'"
- Polycarp of Smyrna, Epistle of Polycarp to the Philippians, 2, "but being mindful of what the Lord said in His teaching: 'Judge not, that ye be not judged; forgive, and it shall be forgiven unto you; be merciful, that ye may obtain mercy; with what measure ye mete, it shall be measured to you again;' and once more, 'Blessed are the poor, and those that are persecuted for righteousness' sake, for theirs is the kingdom of God.'"
- Papias of Hierapolis, The Expositions of the Saying of the Lord, 4: "As the elders who saw John the disciple of the Lord remembered that they had heard from him how the Lord taught in regard to those times, and said: 'The days will come in which vines shall grow, having each ten thousand branches, and in each branch ten thousand twigs, and in each true twig ten thousand shoots, and in every one of the shoots ten thousand clusters, and on every one of the clusters ten thousand grapes, and every grape when pressed will give five-and-twenty metretes of wine. And when any one of the saints shall lay hold of a cluster, another shall cry out, I am a better cluster, take me; bless the Lord through me.' In like manner, [He said] that a grain of wheat would produce ten thousand ears, and that every ear would have ten thousand grains, and every grain would yield ten pounds of clear, pure, fine flour; and that apples, and seeds, and grass would produce in similar proportions; and that all animals, feeding then only on the productions of the earth, would become peaceable and harmonious, and be in perfect subjection to man.'"
- Justin Martyr, Dialogue with Trypho, 47: "Wherefore also our Lord Jesus Christ said, In whatsoever things I apprehend you, in those I shall judge you."
- Clement of Alexandria, Stromata, I, 24, 158: "For ask, he says for the great things, and the small shall be added to you."
- Clement of Alexandria, Stromata, I, 28, 177: "Rightly therefore the Scripture also in its desire to make us such dialecticians, exhorts us: Be approved moneychangers, disapproving some things, but holding fast that which is good."
- Clement of Alexandria, Stromata, V, 10, 64: "For not grudgingly, he saith, did the Lord declare in a certain gospel: My mystery is for me and for the sons of my house."
- Origen, Homily on Jeremiah, XX, 3: "But the Saviour himself saith: He who is near me is near the fire; he who is far from me, is far from the kingdom." This saying is in the Gospel of Thomas (Saying 82).

=== Oxyrhynchus Logia ===
- Second Logion: "Jesus saith, Except you fast to the world, you shall in no wise find the kingdom of God."
- Third Logion: "Jesus saith, I stood in the midst of the world, and in the flesh was I seen of them, and I found all men drunken, and none found I athirst among them, and my soul grieved over the sons of men, because they are blind in their heart, and see not."
- Fifth Logion: "Jesus saith, Wherever there are three, they are without God; and wherever there is one alone, I say I am with him. Raise the stone and there thou shalt find me; cleave the wood, and there am I."
- Sixth Logion: "Jesus saith, A prophet is not acceptable in his own country, neither doth a physician work cures upon them that know him."
- Seventh Logion: "Jesus saith, A city built upon the top of a hill and stablished can neither fall nor be hid."
- Eighth Logion: "Jesus saith, Thou hearest with one ear... ."

== See also ==
- Logia
- List of Gospels
- Q Gospel
- Gospel of the Saviour
- Gospel of Peter
- Gospel of Thomas
- Oxyrhynchus Gospels
- Egerton Gospel
- Fayyum Fragment
- Dialogue of the Saviour
- Gospel of the Ebionites
- Gospel of the Hebrews
- Gospel of the Nazoraeans
- Secret Gospel of Mark
- Gospel of Marcion
- Gospel of Judas
- Other endings of Mark

== Bibliography ==
The Catholic Encyclopedia-"Agrapha" - 1907, therefore free of copyright
