= My Belief: Essays on Life and Art =

Collection of essays by Hermann Hesse

- First edition cover (1974)
- Author: Hermann Hesse
- Translator: Denver Lindley; Ralph Manheim
- Cover artist: Justin Todd
- Language: English
- Subject: Essay
- Publisher: Farrar, Straus and Giroux
- Publication date: 1974
- Publication place: United States
- Media type: Print

My Belief: Essays on Life and Art is a collection of essays by Hermann Hesse. The essays, written between 1904 and 1961, were originally published in German, either individually or in various collections between 1951 and 1973. This collection in English was first published in 1974, edited by Theodore Ziolkowski.

== The essays ==
The essays were translated in 1974 by Denver Lindley with the exception of "From a Diary" and "Anti-Semitism" which were translated by Ralph Manheim. The book is divided into two parts and the essay titles, with the year they were written, follow.

=== Part One: Essays 1904–1961 ===
- "At Year's End" (1904)
- "On Little Joys" (1905)
- "Letter to a Young Poet" (1910)
- "Old Music" (1913)
- "Letter to a Philistine" (1915)
- "Language" (1917)
- "The Refuge" (1917)
- "Concerning the Soul" (1917)
- "Artists and Psychoanalysis" (1918)
- "From My Diary" (1918)
- "Fantasies" (1918)
- "On Poems" (1918)
- "The Brothers Karamazov, or The Decline of Europe" (1919)
- "Thoughts on The Idiot by Dostoevsky" (1919)
- "Books on Trial" (1919)
- "Variations on a Theme by Wilhelm Schäfer" (1919)
- "On Reading Books" (1920)
- "A Poet's Preface to His Selected Works" (1921)
- "About Jean Paul" (1921)
- "Exotic Art" (1922)
- "On Hölderlin" (1924)
- "Postscript to Novalis, Documents on His Life and Death" (1924)
- "About Dostoevsky" (1925)
- "Our Age's Yearning for a Philosophy of Life" (1926, 1927)
- "A Night's Work" (1928)
- "A Virtuoso's Concert" (1929)
- "The Magic of the Book" (1930)
- "About Good and Bad Critics" (1930)
- "My Belief" (1931)
- "Gratitude to Goethe" (1932)
- "A Bit of Theology" (1932)
- "On Reading a Novel" (1933)
- "From a Diary" (1933)
- "Memories of Klingsor's Summer" (1938)
- "Postscript to Steppenwolf" (1941)
- "Favorite Reading" (1945)
- "The Peach Tree" (1945)
- "Dream Gift" (1946)
- "Description of a Landscape" (1947)
- "Mysteries" (1947)
- "The Omitted Words" (1948)
- "Happiness" (1949)
- "On Old Age" (1952)
- "Interpreting Kafka" (1956)
- "Anti-Semitism" (1922, 1958)
- "Joseph Knecht to Carlo Ferromonte" (1961)

=== Part Two ===
==== I. European and American Literature ====
- "Caesarius of Heisterbach" (1908)
- "Giovanni Boccaccio" (1904)
- "Casanova" (1925)
- "Hans Christian Andersen" (1910)
- "Walt Whitman" (1904)
- "August Strindberg" (1909, 1949)
- "Selma Lagerlöf" (1908)
- "Maurice Maeterlinck" (1900)
- "Romain Rolland" (1922, 1915)
- "André Gide" (1951, 1933)
- "Rainer Maria Rilke" (1928, 1927, 1933)
- "D.H. Lawrence" (1933, 1934, 1930)
- "Thomas Wolfe" (1933)
- "J.D. Salinger" (1953)

==== II. Intellectual History ====
- "Sigmund Freud" (1925, 1919)
- "C.G. Jung" (1931, 1934)
- "Jacob Burckhardt" (1935)
- "Karl Marx" (1932)
- "Henri Bergson" (1916)
- "Count Hermann Keyserling" (1920)
- "Oswald Spengler" (1924)
- "José Ortega y Gasset" (1931, 1932)
- "Leopold Ziegler" (1936)

==== III. Oriental History ====
- "Introduction" (1929)
- "Hinduism" (1923)
- "The Speeches of Buddha" (1921, 1922)
- "Chinese Literature" (1911, 1926, 1914, 1922, 1929, 1925)
- "View of the Far East" (1959)

== Background ==
Hermann Hesse was a professional writer and spent a substantial amount of his time reviewing books, assembling anthologies and writing essays. His essays are significant as they provide a glimpse of the man behind the novels that made him famous.

This collection contains most of Hesse's important essays except for the political pieces published separately in If the War Goes On ... (1946) and the autobiographical reminiscences published in Autobiographical Writings (1937). They were written over a period of almost 60 years and can be divided into three distinct groups: literary criticism, personal beliefs and cultural criticism.

Hesse's earliest essays revolve around narrow literary topics but become more philosophical and political in the 1920s to 1930s and finally the reflections of a man who has retreated from the strife of dialectics and now deals with such matters with greater detachment.

Prior to the 1970s, only a few of Hesse's essays have been available in English. "The Brothers Karamazov, or The Decline of Europe" and "Thoughts on The Idiot by Dostoevsky" were translated to English by Sydney Schiff and published in 1923 under the title In Sight of Chaos. This collection gives English readers access to an important side of Hermann Hesse's literary career and contribute significantly to the understanding of his fiction.
