= Marcian (disambiguation) =

Marcian most often refers to Flavius Marcianus, Eastern Roman emperor from 450 to 457

Marcian (Marcianus) may also refer to:

- Saint Marcian of Syracuse (first bishop of Syracuse) (1st century)
- Saint Marcian of Tortona (first bishop of Tortona) (died 120)
- Marcion of Sinope, 2nd century Christian heretic
- Marcian of Rhossos (fl. 2nd century), alleged author of the Gospel of Peter, may be the same as Marcion of Sinope
- Aelius Marcianus, 3rd century jurist
- Lucius Aurelius Marcianus, 3rd century Roman soldier
- Marcian of Heraclea, 4th century geographer
- Marcianus (praefectus urbi), an urban prefect of Rome in 409
- Marcian (usurper), tried to overthrow Emperor Zeno in 479
- Marcian (cousin of Justin II), Byzantine general and cousin of Justin II
- Marcian Hoff (born 1937), microprocessor inventor
- Marziano Lavarello ("Marziano II" or "Marcianus II"), 20th century Italian eccentric and pretender

== See also ==
- Marcion
- Marsien
- Martianus
