= Unknown Gospel =

Unknown Gospel may refer to:

- Egerton Gospel
- Gospel of the Saviour, also known as the Unknown Berlin Gospel
