= Faiyum (disambiguation) =

Faiyum is a city in Middle Egypt. Faiyum, Fayoum or Fayyum may also refer to:

- Faiyum Oasis, in the Faiyum region in Egypt
- Faiyum Governorate, one of the governorates of Egypt
  - The Fayyum Fragment, a papyrus fragment discovered there
  - Faiyum SC, Egyptian football club in Faiyum
  - Faiyum Stadium, multi-purpose stadium in Faiyum
  - Faiyum University (FU), Egyptian public university in Faiyum
- Faiyum mummy portraits, naturalistic painted portraits associated with mummies found in the Faiyum area
- Fayyum (fossil deposit), a fossil-bearing region
