= Gospel of Perfection =

Lost text from the New Testament apocrypha

The Gospel of Perfection is a lost text from the New Testament apocrypha. The text is mentioned in ancient anti-heretical works by the Church Fathers. It is thought to be a gnostic text of the Ophites, and is believed by some to be the same as the Gospel of Eve, though the words of Saint Epiphanius implied that they were separate Gospels. Some others also believe that it was the same as the Gospel of Philip. In regards to the Gospel, Epiphanius stated,

"Some of them (i.e. of the Gnostics) there are who vaunt the possession of a certain fictitious, far-fetched poem which they call the Gospel of Perfection, whereas it is not a Gospel, but the perfection of misery. For the bitterness of death is consummated in that production of the devil. Others without shame boast their Gospel of Eve.

— Saint Epiphanius

The Gospel of Perfection is also briefly discussed in the Arabic Infancy Gospel, where, after a "lengthy account of the miracles performed by Christ while a child in Egypt", it states,

"And the Lord Jesus did many miracles in Egypt, which are neither to be found in the Gospel of the Infancy, nor in the Gospel of Perfection."

— Arabic Infancy Gospel, Chapter 25

In mystery religions, the term perfect had a special meaning, namely that someone who was a perfect had achieved total enlightenment. This is similar in some ways to the concept of achieving Nirvana within Buddhism.

== See also ==
- List of Gospels
