= Arabic Infancy Gospel =

New Testament apocryphal writing concerning the infancy of Jesus

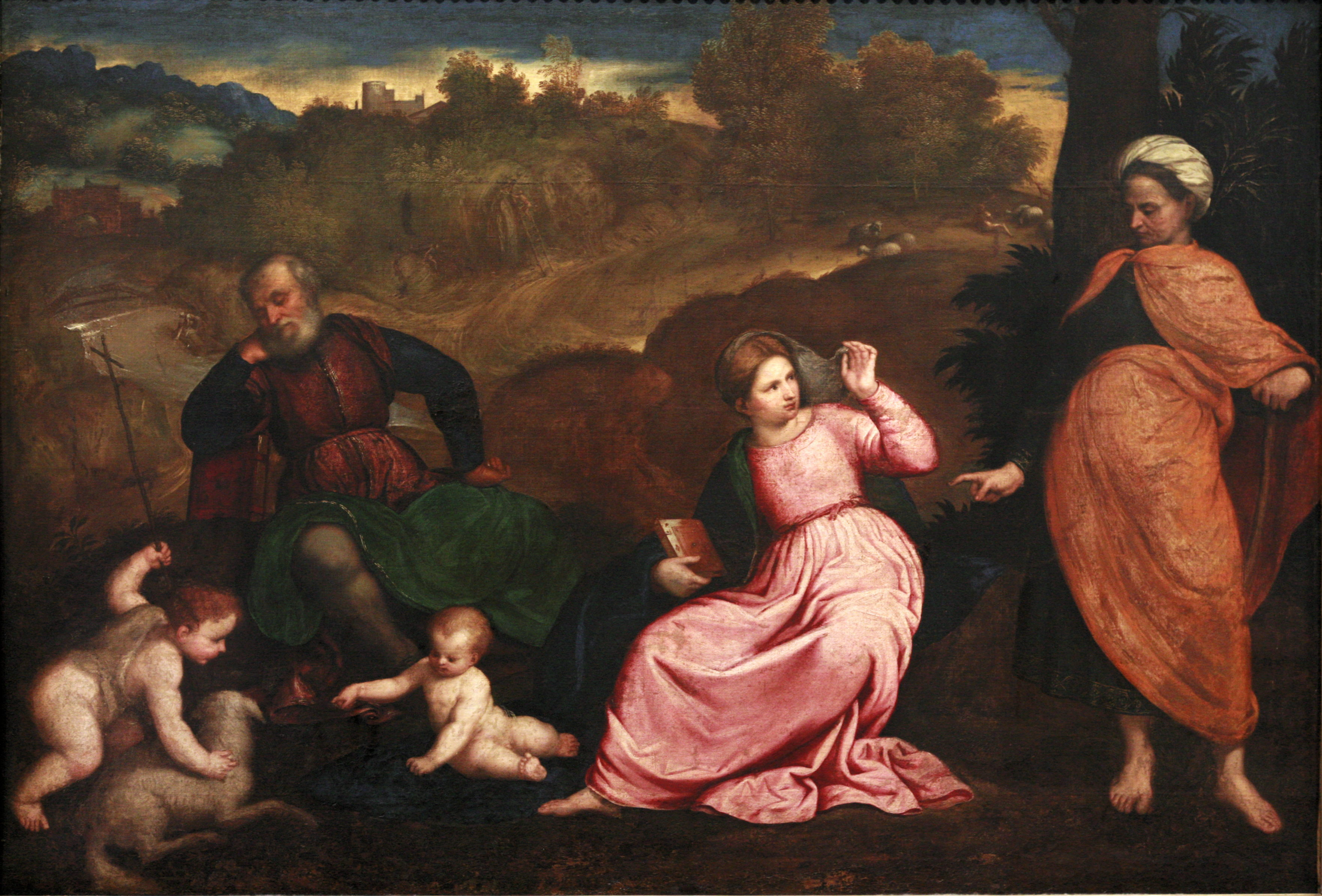
The Rest on the Flight into Egypt, painting by Paris Bordone, circa 1530: In 2015, French art historian Anne Corneloup claimed that it illustrated a specific episode from the Infancy Gospel.

The Arabic Infancy Gospel is a New Testament apocryphal writing concerning the infancy of Jesus. It may have been compiled as early as the sixth century, and was partly based on the Infancy Gospel of Thomas, the Gospel of James, and the Gospel of Pseudo-Matthew, though much of it is also based on oral tradition. The only two surviving manuscripts date from 1299 AD and the 15th/16th century in Arabic. They were copied in the area of northern Iraq and show influence from the Quran.

The Arabic Infancy Gospel is related to an older East Syriac work titled the History of the Virgin, as it is either an Arabic translation of it or both of them are derived from a common source that might be identified as a Syriac language Infancy Gospel dating to the sixth century or earlier. Both versions feature scenes of the baby Jesus working miracles in common settings. In both texts, Mary helps to bring about the circumstances from which these miracles take place in.

== Contents ==
It consists of three parts:

1. The birth of Jesus – based on the Protevangelium of James
2. Miracles during the Flight into Egypt – in relation with the Vision of Theophilus but also local traditions
3. The miracles of Jesus as a boy – based on the Infancy Gospel of Thomas

It contains a number of embellishments on the earlier text, however, including a diaper (of Jesus) that heals people, sweat (of Jesus) that turns into balm, curing leprosy, and dyeing cloth varied colours using only indigo dye. It also claims earlier encounters for Jesus with Judas Iscariot, and with the thieves with whom he is later crucified, as well as being one of the earliest documents.

== Manuscripts and editions ==
Two major editions of the Arabic Infancy Gospel have been published. An Arabic version was published by Henry Sike in 1697 together with a Latin translation, based on a since-lost manuscript from the fifteenth century. Much later, another version based on a manuscript at the Laurentian Library (Codex Orientalis 387, dated to 1299) was published by Mario E. Provera.

== Dating ==
The Gospel is thought to have originated from Syriac language version created perhaps in the fifth or sixth century. The earliest known mention of the Gospel was by Isho'dad of Merv, a ninth-century Syrian Church Father, in his biblical commentary concerning the Gospel of Matthew. The narrative of the Arabic Infancy Gospel, particularly the second part concerning the miracles in Egypt, can also be found in the Quran. Some critical scholarship claim its presence in the Qu'ran may be due to the influence the Gospel had among the Arabs. It is not known for certain that the Gospel was present in the Hejaz, but it can be seen as likely. However, according to Islamic scholars the Gospel was translated into Arabic in the post-Islamic period due to the difficulty that 16th century Europeans would have in translating early Arabic's defective script into Latin as well as the extreme rarity of written texts in Pre-Islamic Arabia. Most recent research in the field of Islamic studies by Sydney Griffith et al. (2013), David D. Grafton (2014), Clair Wilde (2014) & ML Hjälm et al. (2016 & 2017) assert that "all one can say about the possibility of a pre-Islamic, Christian version of the Gospel in Arabic is that no sure sign of its actual existence has yet emerged." Additionally ML Hjälm in her most recent research (2017) inserts that "manuscripts containing translations of the gospels are encountered no earlier than the year 873". However, according to scholars such as Gabriel S. Reynolds, it doesn't necessarily mean that the transmissions have to come from written sources, but rather from Jewish and Christian sources that circulated orally in late antique near east.

== Quranic parallels ==
Historians working in Quranic studies have discussed a parallel between the Arabic Infancy Gospel and the Quran (Surah 19:29–34) where Jesus speaks from the cradle:

Arabic Infancy Gospel 2: "He has said that Jesus spoke, and, indeed, when He was lying in His cradle said to Mary His mother: I am Jesus, the Son of God, the Logos, whom thou hast brought forth, as the Angel Gabriel announced to thee; and my Father has sent me for the salvation of the world."

Surah 19:29–34: "But she pointed to the babe. They said: "How can we talk to one who is a child in the cradle?" He said: "I am indeed a servant of Allah: He hath given me revelation and made me a prophet; And He hath made me blessed wheresoever I be, and hath enjoined on me Prayer and Charity as long as I live; (He) hath made me kind to my mother, and not overbearing or miserable; So peace is on me the day I was born, the day that I die, and the day that I shall be raised up to life (again)"! Such (was) Jesus the son of Mary: (it is) a statement of truth, about which they (vainly) dispute."

== Zoroastrian connection ==
The third chapter of this Gospel covers the story of the wise men of the East, which, in some respects, closely follows the version of the story from Matthew. Unlike Matthew, however, this account cites Zoradascht (Zoroaster) as the source of the prophecy that motivated the wise men to seek the infant Jesus.

== See also ==
- Acts of the Apostles (genre)
- Agrapha
- List of Gospels
- New Testament apocrypha
- Pseudepigraphy
- Textual criticism

== Bibliography ==
- Burke, Tony (2019). "Mary in the Apocrypha". In Maunder, Chris (ed.). The Oxford Handbook of Mary. Oxford University Press. pp. 41–53.
- Horn, Cornelia (2020). "The Power of Leadership through Mediation, or How Mary Exercises Overlapping Authority". In Beavis, Mary Ann; Kateusz, Ally (eds.). Rediscovering the Marys: Maria, Mariamne, Miriam. Bloomsbury. pp. 99–112.
- Reynolds, Gabriel Said (2017). "Biblical Background". In Rippin, Andrew; Mojaddedi, Jawid (eds.). The Wiley Blackwell Companion to the Qur'an. Wiley-Blackwell. pp. 303–319.
- Schroter, Jens (2021). The Apocryphal Gospels: Jesus Traditions Outside the Bible. Cascade Books. ISBN 978-1-6667-0670-3.
