= Petronius (centurion) =

In the non-canonical Gospel of Peter, Petronius is the centurion who is ordered by Pontius Pilate to guard the tomb of Jesus (Gos. Peter 8).

== See also ==
- Cornelius the Centurion
- Apocrypha
