= List of gospels =

Written descriptions of the life and teachings of Jesus Christ

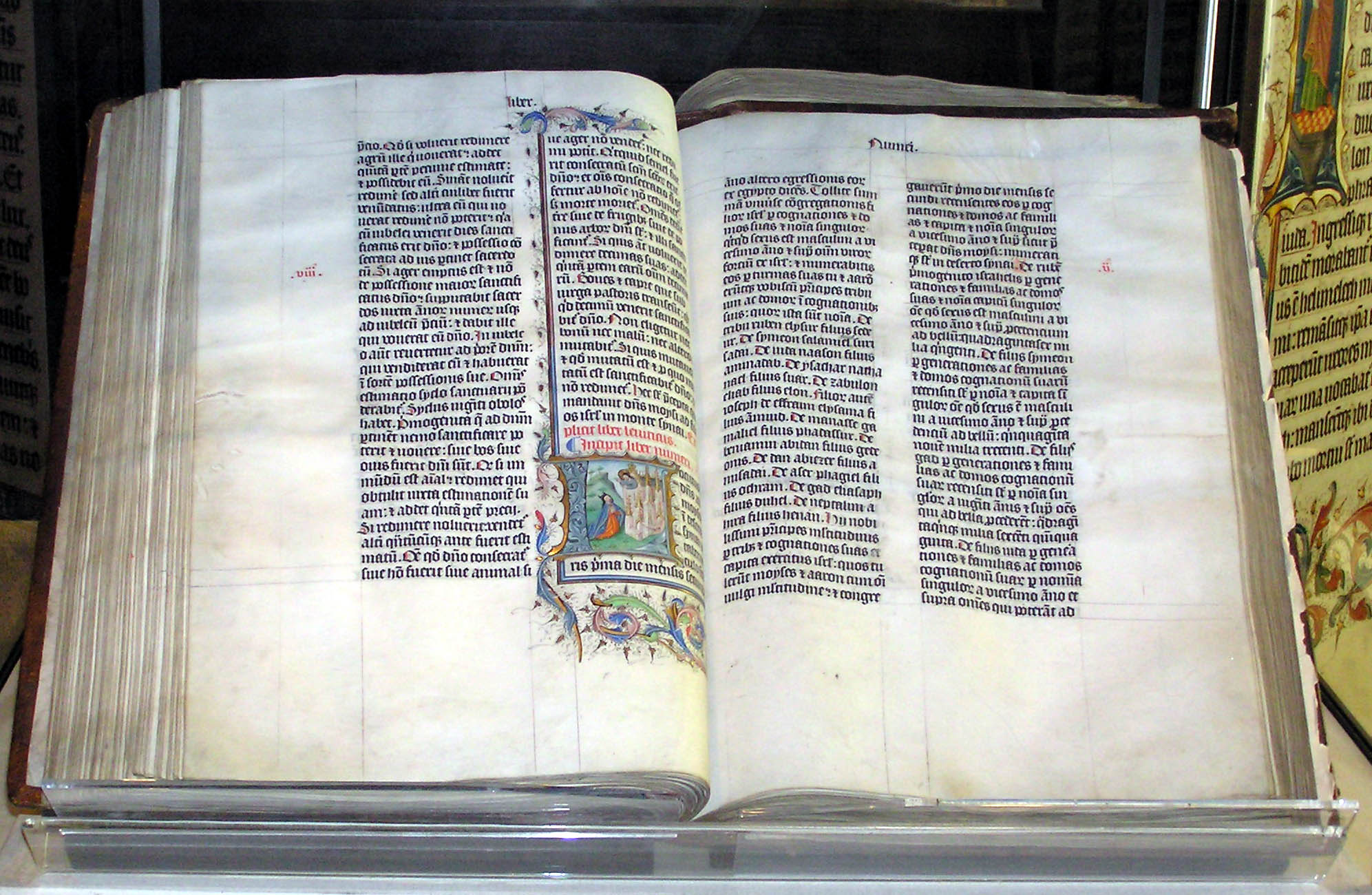
The canonical Gospels of Matthew, Mark, Luke, and John can be found in Christian Bibles

Gospels (Greek: εὐαγγέλιον, lit. 'good news'; Latin: evangelia) are the written accounts of Jesus Christ's life and teachings. The term originally referred to the central message of Christianity –the “good news”– before coming to denote the books in which the message was recorded.

The term "gospel" refers to a genre of ancient biography found in early Christian literature. (Note: There exists texts use the name "gospel" but do not fit this definition; the only notable example, the Coptic tract known as Gospel of the Lots of Mary, is believed to be a pamphlet for divination or bibliomancy. It is not discussed further in the article below.) The mainstream biblical canon is the New Testament, which includes four canonical gospels (Matthew, Mark, Luke, and John). Other gospels exist but are not included in modern mainstream biblical canons. These additional gospels are referred to as New Testament apocrypha or non-canonical gospels. Some of these texts have had an impact on Christian traditions, including various forms of iconography, by providing alternative narratives and perspectives on the life and teachings of Jesus. This then influenced artistic representations and theological interpretations.

== Canonical gospels ==
- Synoptic gospels
  - Gospel of Matthew
  - Gospel of Mark (including longer ending - see also the Freer Logion)
  - Gospel of Luke
- Gospel of John

== 1st Century - 7th Century AD ==
=== Gnostic Gospels ===
- Gospel of Thomas – a gospel of phrases or sayings, also known as the Coptic Gospel of Thomas
- Gospel of Basilides – composed in Egypt around 120–140 AD, thought to be a Gnostic gospel harmony of the canonical gospels
- Gospel of Truth (Valentinian) – mid-2nd-century, departed from earlier Gnostic works by defending the physicality of Christ and his resurrection
- Gospel of the Four Heavenly Realms – mid-2nd-century, thought to be a Gnostic cosmology, most likely in the form of a dialogue between Jesus and his disciples
- Gospel of Mary – a 2nd-century Gnostic text
- Gospel of Judas – 2nd-century, documents Gnostic teachings in the form of a dialogue between Jesus and Judas
- Greek Gospel of the Egyptians – composed in the second quarter of the 2nd century
- Gospel of Philip – a 3rd-century gospel of sayings
- Gospel of the Twelve Apostles – a Syriac-language gospel titled the Gospel of the Twelve. This work is shorter than the regular gospels and seems to be different from the lost Gospel of the Twelve
- Gospel of Perfection – 4th-century Ophite poem mentioned only once by a patristic source, Epiphanius, and referred to once in the 6th century Syriac Infancy Gospel
- Coptic Gospel of the Egyptians – also called Holy Book of the Great Invisible Spirit

=== Jewish-Christian Gospels ===
- Gospel of the Hebrews – consisting of seven citations by Epiphanius
- Gospel of the Nazarenes – consisting of citations and marginal notes by Jerome and others
- Gospel of the Ebionites – a fragmented gospel harmony of the Synoptic Gospels, modified to reflect the theology of the writer
- Gospel of the Twelve – a lost gospel mentioned by Origen as part of a list of heretical works

=== Infancy Gospels ===
- Armenian Infancy Gospel
- Protoevangelium of James
- Libellus de Nativitate Sanctae Mariae – Gospel of the Nativity of Mary
- Gospel of Pseudo-Matthew
- History of Joseph the Carpenter
- Infancy Gospel of Thomas
- Latin Infancy Gospel – also known as the "J Composition"
- Syriac Infancy Gospel

=== Fragmentary preserved gospels ===
Fragmentary gospels are those preserved from primary sources.

- Gospel of Eve – mentioned only once by Epiphanius around 400 AD, who preserves a single brief passage in quotation
- Gospel of Mani – 3rd-century, attributed to the Persian Mani, the founder of Manichaeism
- Gospel of the Saviour (also known as the Unknown Berlin Gospel) – a highly fragmentary 6th-century manuscript based on a late 2nd- or early 3rd-century original
- Coptic Gospel of the Twelve – late 2nd-century Coptic language work. Although often equated with the Gospel of the Ebionites, it appears to be a retelling the Gospel of John in the pattern of the Synoptics
- Gospel of Peter - believed to be an early 2nd-century work

=== Reconstructed Gospels ===
Reconstructed gospels are those preserved from secondary sources and commentaries.

- Secret Gospel of Mark – legitimacy is debated, as the single source mentioning it was lost before it could be independently authenticated
- Gospel of Matthias – a lost text from the New Testament apocrypha; content has been surmised from descriptions by church fathers
- Gospel of Marcion – 2nd-century, closely related to the Gospel of Luke

=== Lost Gospels ===
Text known only by their mentions in other sources.

- Gospel of Cerinthus – around 90–120 AD according to Epiphanius, this is a Jewish gospel identical to the Gospel of the Ebionites. According to the Hebrews, it was apparently a truncated version of the Gospel of Matthew
- Gospel of Apelles – mid to late 2nd-century, an edited version of Marcion's Gospel
- Gospel of Valentinus (Note: Mentioned by Tertullian in Adversus Valentinianos, according to Irenaeus, it is the same as the Gospel of Truth)
- Gospel of the Encratites (Note: Epiphanius ascribed a gospel to the sect of Encratites. It is more probable however, that he referred to the Gospel of Tatian)
- Gospel of Andrew – mentioned by two 5th-century sources (Augustine and Pope Innocent I) who list it as apocryphal (Note: Augustine and Innocent only mentioned it once with no information about it. If it is the same as the Acts of Andrew, then it was written around 150–250 AD and is not lost, and is kind of a Christian retelling of the Odyssey, only with St. Andrew in the lead role.)
- Gospel of Bartholomew, Gospel of Hesychius, and Gospel of Lucius – mentioned by two 5th-century sources, Jerome and Gelasian Decree, that both list it as apocryphal (Note: Jerome mentions it also in Catul. Script. Eccles. in Pantæn.) (Note: This phrase is found in the Decree of Gelasius wherein certain gospels are condemned by that title. What they were is uncertain. Jerome speaks of "those books which go under the names of Lucian and Hesychius and are esteemed through the perverse humors of some".)
- Gospel of Merinthus (Note: The Gospel of Merinthus is mentioned only by Epiphanius as one of those spurious gospels which he supposes were written in the apostles' time and referred to by Luke in Luke 1:1 "as not being a true and genuine account". Fabricius supposes that Merinthus and Cerinthus are the same person and that Cerinthus was changed into Merinthus by the way of banter or reproach. Although Epiphanius makes them into two different persons, yet in the heresy of the Cerinthians, he professes himself uncertain. He said "The Cerinthians are also called Merinthians as we see by the accounts we have; but whether this Cerinthus was also called Merinthus, a fellow laborer of his, God knows".) – mentioned only by Epiphanius. It is thought by most to be the Gospel of Cerinthus, with the confusion due to a scribal error
- An unknown number of other Gnostic gospels not cited by name (Note: The Gnostics had various gospels. Epiphanius speaks of their writing "The Revelation of Adam, and other false gospels".)
- Gospel of the Adversary of the Law and the Prophets
- Memoirs of the Apostles – a lost narrative of the life of Jesus, mentioned by Justin Martyr. The passages quoted by Justin may have originated from a gospel harmony of the Synoptic Gospels composed by Justin or his school

=== Fragments of unknown/lost gospels ===
These are fragmentary texts whose origins are uncertain or unknown, preserved from primary sources.

- Papyrus Egerton 2 – late 2nd-century manuscript of a possibly earlier original; contents parallel sections of the canonical gospels but differ textually. This manuscript also contains an incomplete miracle account, which has no equivalent in the canonical gospels
- Fayyum Fragment – a fragment of about 100 Greek letters in 3rd-century script. The text seems to parallel Mark 14:26–31
- Oxyrhynchus Papyri – mid-2nd-century fragments; related to and/or paraphrases Mark, Matthew, and Luke, but #840 contains a short vignette about Jesus and a Pharisee not found in any known gospel
- Gospel of Jesus' Wife – a fragment based on the Gospel of Thomas, suspected as a modern forgery
- Papyrus Berolinensis 1171 – Book of Enoch, 0–6th-century Greek fragment, possibly from an apocryphal gospel or amulet based on John
- Papyrus Cairensis 10735 – 6th- or 7th-century Greek fragment, possibly from a lost gospel, may be a homily or commentary
- Papyrus Merton 51 – fragment from an apocryphal gospel or a homily on Luke 6:7
- Strasbourg Fragment – fragment of a lost gospel, likely related to Acts of John

=== Hypothesized text sources of canonical gospels ===
- Q source – Q consists of material common to Matthew and Luke, but not found in Mark
- M source – M consists of material unique to Matthew
- L source – L consists of material unique to Luke
- Signs Gospel and Discourses Gospel – the narrative of the Seven Signs and the source of the discourse material, respectively, in John

== Medieval gospels ==
- Gospel of the Seventy – a lost 8th or 9th-century Manichean work
- Gospel of Nicodemus – a post-10th-century Christian devotional work (or works) in many variants; the first section is highly dependent upon the 5th century Acts of Pilate
- Gospel of the Secret Supper – a 12th-century Cathar scripture
- Gospel of Barnabas – a 16th-century harmony of the canonical gospels with Islamic elements, probably of Spanish (Morisco) or Italian origin

== Modern gospels ==
=== 19th Century ===
- Life and Morals of Jesus (1820)
- The Book of Mormon (1830)
- Ur-Gospel of the Essenes (1848) (Note: Friedrich Clemens Gerke was a German writer and journalist, most notable for his revision of Morse Code in 1848. In 1867 he published the Ur-Gospel of the Essenes (Urevangelium der Essäer). It was also known as the Fifth Gospel (Das Fünfte Evangelium) and later as Jesus the Nazarene — Life, Teachings and Natural Death of the Wisest of the Wise. Reality Retold and Dedicated to the German People (Jesus der Nazarener — Des Weisesten der Weisen Leben, Lehre und natürliches Ende. Der Wirklichkeit nacherzählt und dem deutschen Volke gewidmet.) The book has not been translated into English and the full text in German is available at the internet text archive under the title Jesus der Nazarener.)
- Great Gospel of John (1851–1864)
- The Gospel of the Holy Twelve (1881)
- Oahspe: A New Bible (1882)
- The Unknown Life of Jesus Christ (1894)

=== 20th Century ===
- Gospel of the Childhood of Our Lord Jesus Christ According to St. Peter (1904) (Note: Catulle Mendès was a French poet who claimed to have found gospel written by the Apostle Peter. He said he found the manuscript at the St. Wolfgang Abbey. Unlike other biblical hoaxes, Mendes presented the manuscript, which was written in Old Latin that the Romans had used. However, the manuscript was quickly proved to be a hoax as it was written by Mendes. The gospel is an infancy Gospel attributed to the Apostle Peter. It was originally written in Latin by Mendes but was eventually translated into French by Mendes. The title of the original book is L'Evangile de l'enfance de Notre Seigneur Jésus Christ selon Saint Pierre, mis en français par Catulle Mendès d'après le manuscrit de l'Abbaye de Saint Wolfgang, or The Gospel of the infancy of our Lord Jesus Christ according to Saint Pierre, translated into French by Catulle Mendès from the manuscript of the Abbey of St. Wolfgang.)
- Crucifixion of Jesus, by an Eyewitness (1907) (Note: The Eye-Witness gospel is a gospel written by Elsie Louise Morris and/or Benjamin Fish Austin. The gospel purports to be an old manuscript found in an old Alexandria Library giving a graphic and detailed account of Jesus as a friend of Jesus. The gospel states that Jesus did not die on the cross, but died six months later. The gospel references the Essenes a lot, and is allegedly written by an elder of the Essene order who was a close friend of Jesus'. The document was discovered in a building in Alexandria, but since then, the document has disappeared. It was published in 1907 by John Richardson and again by the Holmes Book Company in 1919. This information was retrieved from 4Enoch.org)
- The Aquarian Gospel of Jesus the Christ (1908)
- The Fifth Gospel (1908, Steiner) (Note: The Fifth Gospel by Rudolf Steiner is another gospel obtained from Akashic records. The gospel is in the form of 13 lectures. The book contains Zoroastrian themes along with Christian themes. The gospel states that the Lord's Prayer is based on an ancient pagan prayer that Jesus obtained from Ahriman. Steiner states that the Gospel can be read at Akashic Record. The gospel's authenticity is doubted because Levi Dowling and Edgar Cayce both produced stories of Jesus' life from Akashic Record. Most of the text can be read at Google Books with the title The Fifth Gospel: From the Akashic Record.)
- Jehoshua the Nazir (1917) (Note: Otoman Zar-Adusht Ha'nish, founder of the Mazdaznan movement published a book called Jehoshua the Nazir. He claimed that he got it from various Eastern mysterious sources. The book was first published in 1917 with the title Yehoshua Nazir; Jesus the Nazarite; life of Christ. The book is accepted as scripture by the Mazdaznan followers. The text is available on the Internet Text Archive.)
- Gospel of Josephus (1927)
- The Mystical Life of Jesus (1929) (Note: Harvey Lewis was a notable Rosicrucian author and author of the Mystical Life of Jesus. The gospel was allegedly inspired by the Aquarian Gospel. The book is a collection of records about Jesus retrieved from the ancient monastreries of the Essenes and the Rosicrucian Order. Lewis allegedly went with a staff of researchers through Palestine and Egypt visiting holy sites and obtaining information. The book states that Jesus entered priesthood and secret priesthood and talks about the doctrines and secret facts about the resurrection.) – based heavily on The Aquarian Gospel, where entire chapters were plagiarized
- Essene Gospel of Peace (1937; 1974)
- The Urantia Book (1955)
- The Poem of the Man-God (1956)
- The Fifth Gospel (1956, Naber) (Note: Hans Naber (or Kurt Berna) was a soldier in World War II who claimed to have been given a message from Jesus Christ about the Shroud of Turin and that he did not die on the cross. He claimed too much blood was on the shroud and that corpses do not bleed, thus the person was probably alive or dying. He published a series of books in an attempt to prove that Jesus did not die on the cross, but survived and went to India. The Fifth Gospel (Das Fünfte Evangelium) was a book in which he attempted to prove that Jesus traveled to India with Mary Magdelene and Thomas the Apostle.)
- The Jesus Scroll (1972)
- The Gospel Given at Ares (1974)
- Gospel of Jesus According to Gabriele Wittek (1977) (Note: Grabriele Wittek, founder of the new religious movement Universal Life published this gospel as a rebuilding of the gospel of the Holy Twelve. The full title of the book is This Is My Word – Alpha and Omega: The Gospel of Jesus. the Christ Revelation, which True Christians the World Over Have Come to Know. The gospel can be read online at Das-Wort Publishing House in Universelles Leben.)
- The Fifth Gospel (1993, Vandenberg), Novel

== See also ==
- Acts of the Apostles (genre)
- Agrapha
- Development of the New Testament canon
- Diatessaron
- Apocrypha
- Gnosticism
- List of New Testament papyri
- The Missing Gospels
- New Testament epistles
- Non-canonical books referenced in the Bible
- Textual criticism
- Pseudepigrapha
- Gospel of the Lots of Mary
