= Gospel of Eve =

Mostly lost text of New Testament apocrypha

The Gospel of Eve is an almost entirely lost text from the New Testament apocrypha, which may be the same as the also lost Gospel of Perfection.

The only known content from it are a few quotations by Epiphanius (Panarion, 26), a Church Father who criticised how the Borborites used it to justify free love, by practicing coitus interruptus and eating semen as a religious act.

== Text ==
Gnostics typically wrote on multiple levels, imbuing texts with complicated mystical esoteric meaning, rather than intending a base interpretation. It is possible that Epiphanius failed to realise this and only read into the text a simple literal interpretation. The quotation Epiphanius claims as a reference to semen is:

I stood on a lofty mountain and saw a gigantic man, and another, a dwarf; and I heard as it were a voice of thunder, and drew nigh for to hear; and He spake unto me and said: I am thou, and thou art I; and wheresoever thou mayest be I am there. In all am I scattered [that is, the Logos as seed or “members”], and whencesoever thou willest, thou gatherest Me; and gathering Me, thou gatherest Thyself.

— From the Gospel of Eve, quoted by Epiphanius, Hæres., xxvi. 3.

While this second passage from their "apocryphal writings," says Epiphanius, was meant to represent the menstrual cycle (it is unclear if he is quoting Revelation 22:2):

I saw a tree bearing twelve manner of fruits every year, and he said unto me, This is the tree of life ...

== Interpretation ==
According to the Naassenes, this reflected the "Seeds disseminated into the cosmos from the Inexpressible [Man], by means of which the whole cosmos is consummated." The scattering of the Logos and its subsequent collection recalls the myths of Osiris and Dionysus. A similar theme of Osirification is present in a Gospel of Philip, quoted by Epiphanius in the same chapter:

I recognised myself, and gathered myself together from all sides; I sowed no children for the ruler, but I tore up his roots, and gathered together [my] limbs that were scattered abroad; I know thee who thou art, for I am from the realms above.

== See also ==
- List of Gospels
