= Papyrus 10 =

Papyrus 𝔓^{10}
- New Testament manuscript
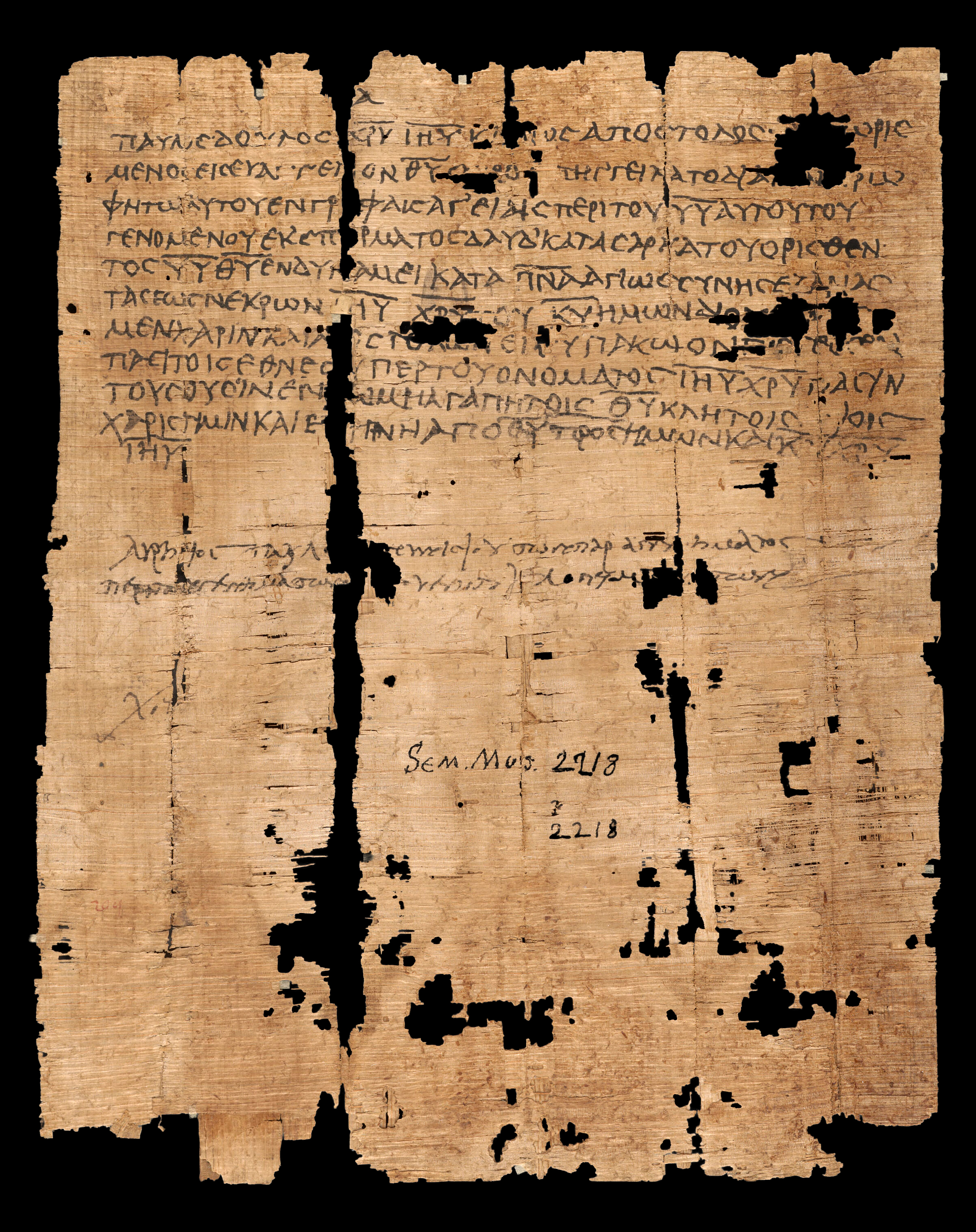
- Romans 1:1–7
- Name: P. Oxy. 209
- Text: Romans 1 †
- Date: 4th century
- Script: Greek
- Found: Oxyrynchus, Egypt
- Now at: Houghton Library
- Cite: Grenfell & A. S. Hunt, Oxyrhynchus Papyri II (1899), pp. 8-9
- Size: 25.1 x 19.9
- Type: Alexandrian text-type
- Category: I

Papyrus 10 (in the Gregory-Aland numbering), signed by 𝔓^{10} and named Oxyrhynchus papyri 209, is an early copy of part of the New Testament content in Greek. It is a papyrus manuscript of the Epistle to the Romans, dating paleographically to the early 4th century.

== Description ==
The manuscript is a fragment of one leaf, written in one column per page. The surviving text is of Romans, verses 1:1-7. The manuscript was written very carelessly. The handwriting is crude and irregular, and the copy contains some irregular spellings. A part of verse 6 is omitted (εν οις εστε και υμεις κλητοι who are called to belong to).

The nomina sacra are written in an abbreviated way.

The Greek text of this codex is a representative of the Alexandrian text-type. Aland placed it in Category I. The manuscript is too brief for certainty. The only variant of any importance is Χριστου Ιησου in Rom 1:7, where the manuscripts all have the reverse order.

== History ==
The papyrus was found tied up with a contract dated in 316 A.D., and other documents of the same period.

It was discovered in Oxyrhynchus, Egypt, and is currently housed at the Houghton Library of the Harvard University (Semitic Museum Inv. 2218), Cambridge (Massachusetts).

== See also ==
- List of New Testament papyri
- Oxyrhynchus papyri
- Papyrus 9
- Papyrus Oxyrhynchus 208
- Papyrus Oxyrhynchus 210
- Romans 1
