= The Tree and Its Fruits =

Parable of Jesus

Jesus' parable of the Tree and its Fruits appears in two similar passages in the New Testament, in the Sermon on the Mount in Matthew's Gospel and the Sermon on the Plain in Luke's Gospel.

== Texts ==
From Matthew 7:15–20 (NRSV):

"Beware of false prophets, who come to you in sheep's clothing but inwardly are ravenous wolves. You will know them by their fruits. Are grapes gathered from thorns, or figs from thistles? In the same way, every good tree bears good fruit, but the bad tree bears bad fruit. A good tree cannot bear bad fruit, nor can a bad tree bear good fruit. Every tree that does not bear good fruit is cut down and thrown into the fire. Thus you will know them by their fruits."

From Luke 6:43-45 (NRSV):

"No good tree bears bad fruit, nor again does a bad tree bear good fruit; for each tree is known by its own fruit. Figs are not gathered from thorns, nor are grapes picked from a bramble bush. The good person out of the good treasure of the heart produces good, and the evil person out of evil treasure produces evil; for it is out of the abundance of the heart that the mouth speaks."

In contrast, the Fruit of the Spirit is holy and will be evident in the life of a true prophet.

In Matthew's Gospel the context relates to testing a prophet. In Luke's Gospel the connection is less obvious. Scottish minister William Robertson Nicoll suggests that "the thread is probably to be found in the word ὑποκριτά, hypokrita, applied to one who by his censoriousness claims to be saintly, yet in reality is a greater sinner than those he blames".

== See also ==
- Fruit of the Holy Spirit
- Gamaliel's principle
- Papyrus Oxyrhynchus 210
- True Vine

The Tree and Its Fruits Life of Jesus: Sermon on the Mount or on the Plain
Preceded by Discourse on the Two Ways in the Sermon on the Mount	New Testament; Events	Succeeded by Parable of the Two Builders in the Sermon on the Mount
