= Alin Suciu =

Romanian coptologist and papyrologist (born 1978)

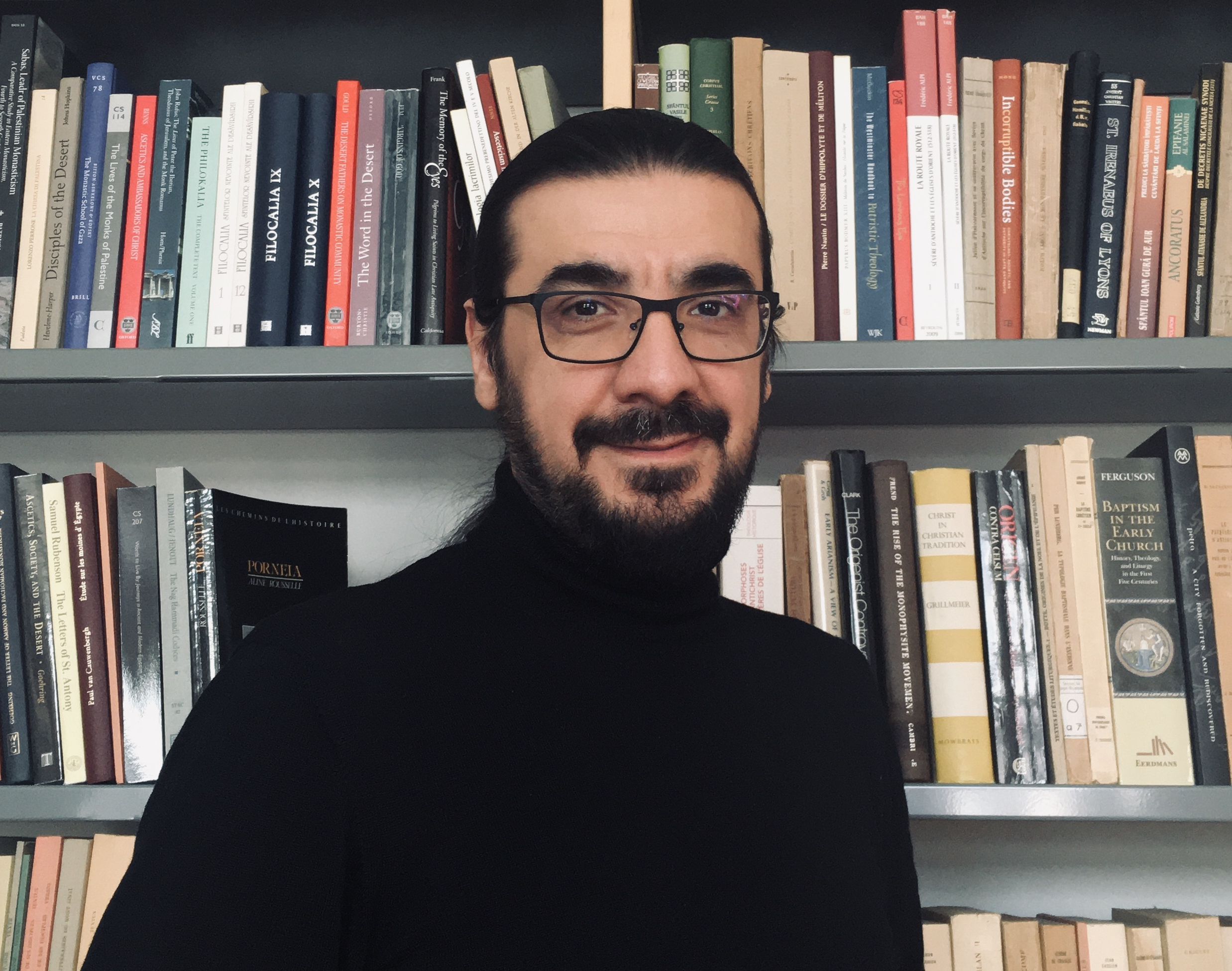
- Born: May 19, 1978 (age 48); Oradea, Socialist Republic of Romania
- Education: University of Oradea; Babeș-Bolyai University; Université Laval; University of Helsinki
- Scientific career
- Fields: Coptic studies; papyrology; patristics; apocrypha; manuscript studies
- Workplaces: Göttingen Academy of Sciences and Humanities
- Thesis: Apocryphon Berolinense/Argentoratense (Previously Known as the Gospel of the Savior) (2013)
- Doctoral advisor: Paul-Hubert Poirier
- Website: alinsuciu.com

Alin Suciu (born 19 May 1978) is a Romanian coptologist and papyrologist. He is a Senior Researcher at the Göttingen Academy of Sciences and Humanities.

== Biography ==
Born in Oradea, he obtained in 2003 a B.A. in Philosophy from the University of Oradea and the next year an M.A. in Ancient and Medieval Philosophy from Babeș-Bolyai University in Cluj-Napoca. In 2013 he earned a Ph.D. degree in Religious Studies from Université Laval, Québec, with thesis written under the direction of Paul-Hubert Poirier. In 2013–2014, Suciu was a researcher at the Hiob Ludolf Center for Ethiopian Studies at the University of Hamburg, and in 2015 he became a researcher at the Göttingen Academy of Sciences and Humanities. In 2019, he received the title of Docent in Early Christian Literature and Coptic Christianity from the Faculty of Theology at the University of Helsinki.

He has published articles on ancient manuscripts and biblical, patristic, and apocryphal texts in the Journal of Biblical Literature, Journal of Semitic Studies, Harvard Theological Review, Vigiliae Christianae, Le Muséon, and elsewhere. He maintains a scholarly blog called Patristics, Apocrypha, Coptic Literature and Manuscripts.

Suciu is a member of the Corpus dei Manoscritti Copti Letterari (CMCL), an international project aimed at the codicological reconstruction of the fragmentary Sahidic manuscripts from the library of the White Monastery, located in the vicinity of Sohag in Upper Egypt. The CMCL project is currently hosted by the Hiob Ludolf Center for Ethiopian Studies in Hamburg.

In the debate over the authenticity of the Gospel of Jesus' Wife papyrus, Suciu pointed out that there are strong arguments to suggest that the fragment is a modern forgery.

He is the author of The Berlin-Strasbourg Apocryphon: A Coptic Apostolic Memoir (WUNT I, 370; Tübingen: Mohr Siebeck, 2017), which focuses on a Coptic apocryphal text previously known as the Gospel of the Savior. Suciu argues that the Berlin-Strasbourg Apocryphon is one of numerous "apostolic memoirs," a peculiar genre of Coptic literature that consists of writings purportedly written by the apostles, often embedded in sermons attributed to famous church fathers.

In 2022, he published a book in Romanian entitled Monahul și scribul: Creștinismul egiptean între idealul monahal și cultura scrisă (Studii și documente de istorie a religiilor, 6; Bucharest: Spandugino, 2022).

== Selected publications ==
- Suciu, Alin. "Revisiting the Literary Dossier of Stephen of Thebes: With Preliminary Editions of the Greek Redactions of the Ascetic Commandments," Adamantius 21 (2015) 301–325.
- Suciu, Alin. "On a Bilingual Copto-Arabic Manuscript of 4 Ezra and the Reception of this Pseudepigraphon in Coptic Literature," Journal for the Study of the Pseudepigrapha 25.1 (2015) 3-22.
- Suciu, Alin. "The Sahidic Version of Jacob of Serugh's Memrā on the Ascension of Christ," Le Muséon 128 (2015) 49–83.
- Suciu, Alin. "Coptic Scribes and Manuscripts. Dated and Datable Codices from the Monastery of Apa Shenoute. I: The Codices of the Scribe Victor, the Son of Shenoute (First Half of the 12th Century)," Journal of Coptic Studies 16 (2014) 195–215.
- Suciu, Alin. "A Coptic Fragment from the History of Joseph the Carpenter in the Collection of Duke University Library," Harvard Theological Review 106:1 (2013) 93–104.
- Suciu, Alin. "Ps.-Theophili Alexandrini Sermo de Cruce et Latrone. Edition of Pierpont Morgan M595 with Parallels and Translation," Zeitschrift für Antikes Christentum – Journal of Ancient Christianity 16 (2012) 181–225.
- Suciu, Alin, Thomassen, Einar. "An Unknown ‘Apocryphal’ Text from the White Monastery," in P. Buzi – A. Camplani (eds.), Christianity in Egypt: Literary Production and Intellectual Trends. Studies in Honor of Tito Orlandi (Studia Ephemeridis ‘Augustinianum,’ 125; Rome: Istituto Patristico Augustinianum, 2011) 477–499.
