= Rest on the Flight into Egypt (Bordone) =

Painting by Paris Bordone

The Rest on the Flight into Egypt
- The Rest on the Return from the Flight into Egypt
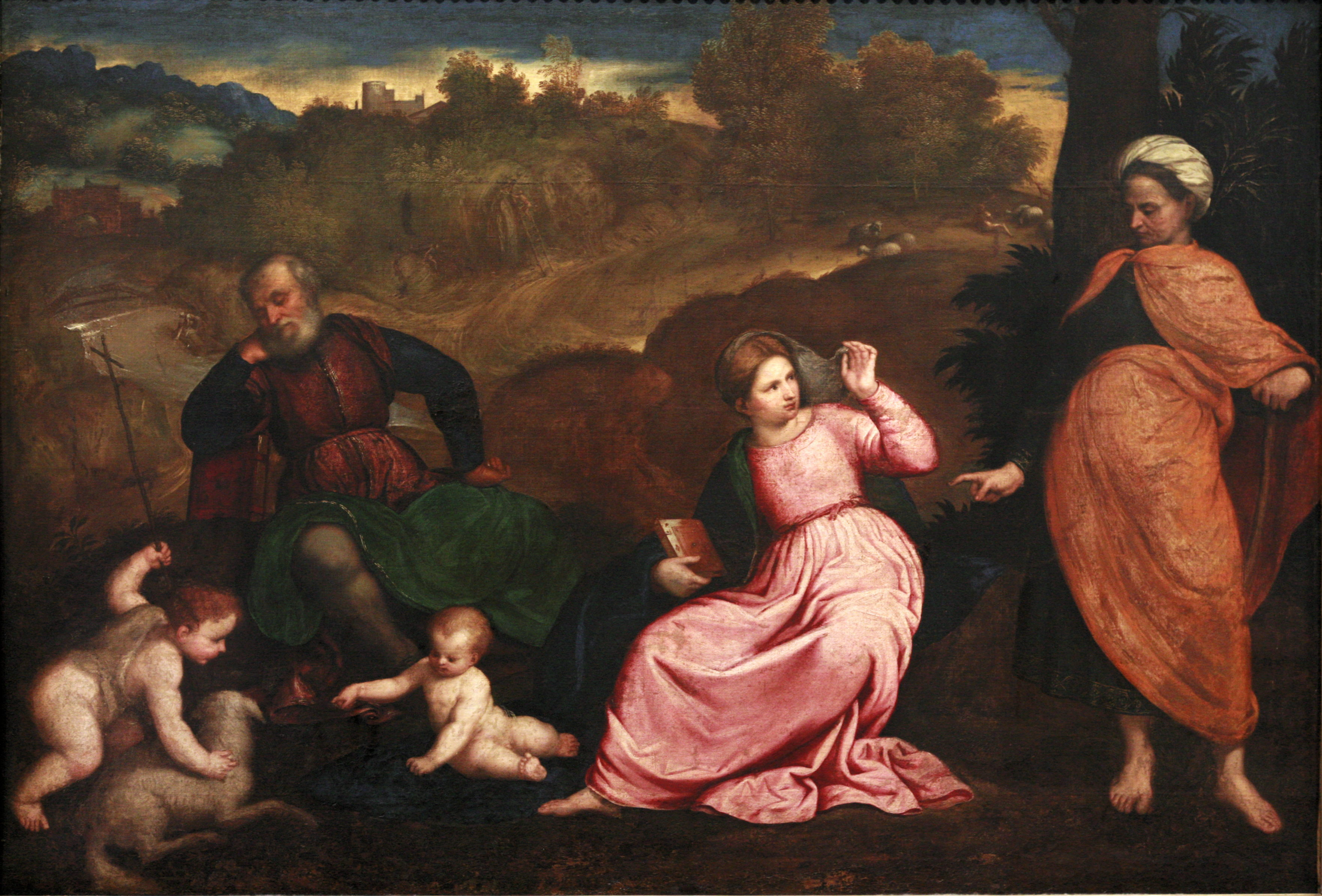
- Artist: Paris Bordone
- Year: circa 1530
- Medium: oil painting on canvas
- Movement: Italian Renaissance; Venetian painting Cinquecento religious art
- Subject: Rest on the Flight into Egypt
- Dimensions: 131 cm × 184 cm (52 in × 72 in)
- Location: Musée des Beaux-Arts, Strasbourg
- Accession: 1890

The Rest on the Flight into Egypt, also called The Rest on the Return from the Flight into Egypt is a circa 1530 oil painting by the Venetian Renaissance painter Paris Bordone. It is on display in the Musée des Beaux-Arts of Strasbourg, France. Its inventory number is 176.

== History ==
The work was painted around 1530 as an altarpiece for the Benedictine church Santa Maria della Misericordia of Noale (today the parish church Chiesa dell'Assunta). It was bought in London in 1890 by Wilhelm von Bode, from the collection of Charles Fairfax Murray. The painting was restored in 1965.

== Description ==
The painting depicts a sleeping Saint Joseph, the babies Jesus and John the Baptist playing with a lamb, and Mary, being approached from the right by an older woman with distinctly "gypsy" features. Some art historians have identified her as Saint Elisabeth, which would account for the presence of John the Baptist and the pictured moment being on the return from Egypt instead of on the way there. It does not, however, explain why Mary would, in that case, have the bewildered gaze and gesture with which Bordone represented her, nor what the solemn and distant attitude of "Elisabeth" would stand for.
Another theory states that this woman is a gypsy fortune-teller, announcing the future fate of both boys. Gypsies (Zingari) were a recurring subject in Venetian painting, influenced by Giorgione's famous The Tempest. A 2015 interpretation of the painting claims that it is inspired by the Syriac Infancy Gospel, in which Mary, on her way to Egypt, would frequently be approached by sick people in search of a miraculous healing, which she would always grant them. In that case, the "Gypsy" would be an old Egyptian showing facial symptoms of the plague, a disease of which Paris Bordone was afraid as well.
