= Gospel of Peter =

Pseudographic gospel

The Gospel of Peter (Ancient Greek: τὸ εὐαγγέλιον κατὰ Πέτρον, romanized: tò euangélion katà Pétron), or the Gospel according to Peter, is an ancient text concerning Jesus Christ, only partially known today. Originally written in Koine Greek, it is a non-canonical gospel and was rejected as apocryphal by the Church's synods of Carthage and Rome, which contributed to the establishment of the New Testament canon. It was the first of the apocryphal gospels to be rediscovered, preserved in the dry sands of Egypt.

A major focus of the surviving fragment of the Gospel of Peter is the Passion narrative, which ascribes responsibility for the crucifixion of Jesus to Herod Antipas rather than to Pontius Pilate.

== Composition ==
=== Authorship ===
The Gospel of Peter explicitly claims to be the work of Saint Peter:

And I with my companions was grieved; and being wounded in mind we hid ourselves:

— Gospel of Peter, 7

But I Simon Peter and Andrew my brother took our nets and went to the sea;

— Gospel of Peter, 14.

According to bible scholar Craig Blomberg, the Gospel of Peter is pseudepigraphical (bearing the name of an author who did not actually compose the text).

The true author of the gospel remains a mystery. Although there are parallels with the three synoptic gospels, Peter does not use any of the material unique to Matthew or unique to Luke. Raymond E. Brown and others find that the author may have been acquainted with the synoptic gospels and even with the Gospel of John; Brown even suggests that the author's source in the canonical gospels was transmitted orally, through readings in the churches, i.e. that the text is based on what the author remembers about the other gospels, together with their own embellishments.

Ron Cameron and others have further speculated the Gospel of Peter was written independently of the synoptic gospels using an early proto-gospel. A consequence of this is the potential existence of a source text that formed the basis of the passion narratives in Matthew, Luke, and Mark, as well as in Peter. Origen makes mention of the Gospel of Peter as agreeing with the tradition of the Hebrews. The relationship to the Gospel according to the Hebrews becomes more clear when Theodoret states that the Nazarenes made use of the Gospel of Peter, for it is known by the testimony of the Fathers generally that the Nazarene Gospel was commonly called the Gospel according to the Hebrews. The same Gospel was in use among the Ebionites, and, in fact, as almost all critics are agreed, the Gospel according to the Hebrews – under various names such as the Gospel according to Peter, according to the Apostles, the Nazarenes, Ebionites, Egyptians, etc. – was substantially the same work, circulated very widely throughout the early Church, though with modifications.

=== Date ===
The gospel is widely thought to date from after the composition of the four canonical gospels. Scholars are divided as to the exact date of the text, with some placing it in the first half of the 2nd century and considering it to have been compiled based on oral traditions about Jesus, independent of the canonical gospels. The dating of the text depends to a certain extent on whether it is the same "Gospel of Peter" condemned by Serapion, Bishop of Antioch upon inspection at Rhossus. The Rhossus community had already been using it in their liturgy.

John Dominic Crossan argues that the Gospel of Peter, as it is found in the modern day, was composed in the 2nd century but incorporates a passion narrative source that predates all other known passion accounts. He calls this primitive passion source the "Cross Gospel." Crossan asserts that this Cross Gospel was written before the synoptic gospels of Mark, Matthew, and Luke and that it influenced both them and the Gospel of Peter. Crossan's view is not accepted by mainstream Biblical scholars.

Craig A. Evans argues that the Gospel of Peter was written in the 2nd century CE to counter anti-Christian polemics of that time (such as the ones found in Celsus's The True Word).

Later Western references, which condemn the work, such as Jerome and the Decretum Gelasianum, traditionally connected to Pope Gelasius I, are apparently based upon the judgment of Eusebius, not upon a direct knowledge of the text.

== Historical references ==
The Second Epistle of Clement refers to a passage thought to be from the Gospel of Peter:

2 Clement 5:2
For the Lord saith, Ye shall be as lambs in the midst of wolves.

2 Clement 5:3
But Peter answered and said unto Him, What then, if the wolves
should tear the lambs?

2 Clement 5:4
Jesus said unto Peter, Let not the lambs fear the wolves after they
are dead; and ye also, fear ye not them that kill you and are not
able to do anything to you; but fear Him that after ye are dead
hath power over soul and body, to cast them into the Gehenna of
fire.

Origen mentions "the Gospel according to Peter, as it is called", together with "the Book of James" (believed by scholars to be the apocryphal Gospel of James), in support of the doctrine of the perpetual virginity of Mary. However, it is not clear that he was referring to what is known modernly as the Gospel of Peter because the extant fragments say nothing about this or about the birth of Jesus.

In his Church History, Eusebius writes that Bishop Serapion of Antioch had been informed that a Christian community in Rhosus was using the Gospel of Peter in their liturgy and had sent a letter authorizing them to do so, while also denying that such Gospel was actually written by Saint Peter. Later, however, Serapion was informed that the Gospel of Peter "hid a heresy", which he attributed to Marcian of Rhossos and that he identified with docetism. Serapion reports that he read the Gospel carefully and had the opportunity "to find, along with much of the Savior's true doctrine, some additions". Eusebius also states that several works had been attributed to Peter: the First Epistle of Peter, the Second Epistle of Peter, the Acts of Peter, the Gospel of Peter, the Preaching of Peter and the Apocalypse of Peter. He accepts the First Epistle of Peter as genuine, the Second Epistle as useful but not canonical, while he describes the others as "not universally accepted". Jerome mistakenly says in his De Viris Illustribus that Serapion wrote the Gospel of Peter.

In his Compendium of Heretical Accounts, Theodoret states that the 4th century Nazarene sect used the Gospel of Peter in their liturgy, though there is little evidence to support this claim. In his Church History, Philip of Side states that "the ancients absolutely refused the Gospel of the Hebrews, the Gospel of Peter and the Gospel of Thomas, which they considered the work of heretics."

== Discovery ==
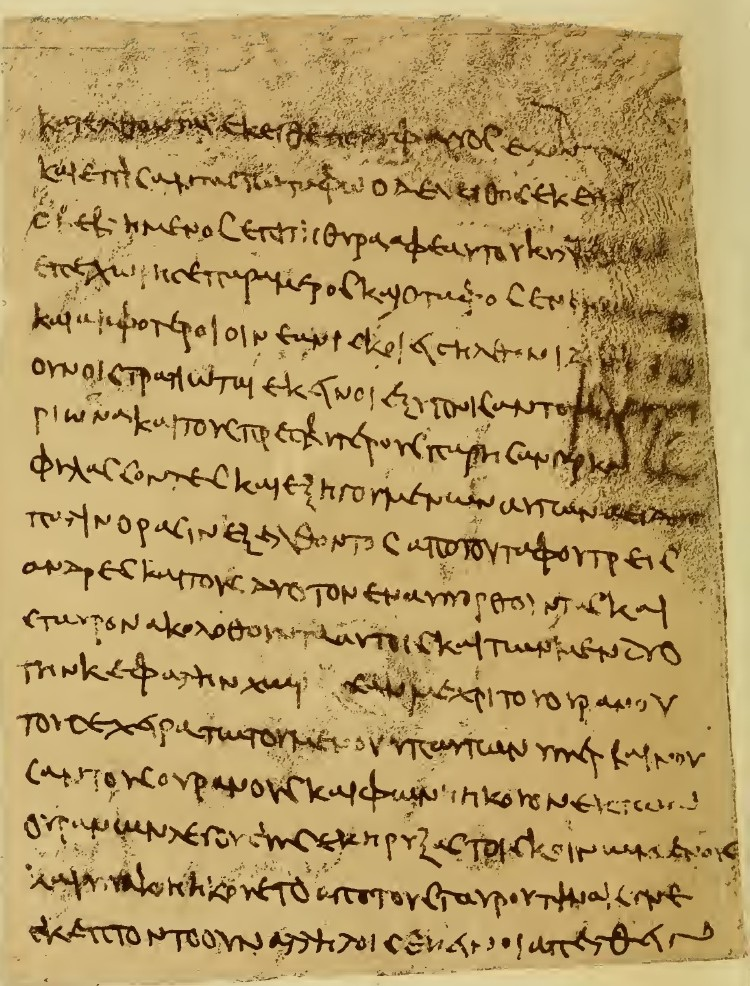
A fragment of the manuscript, found at Akhmim

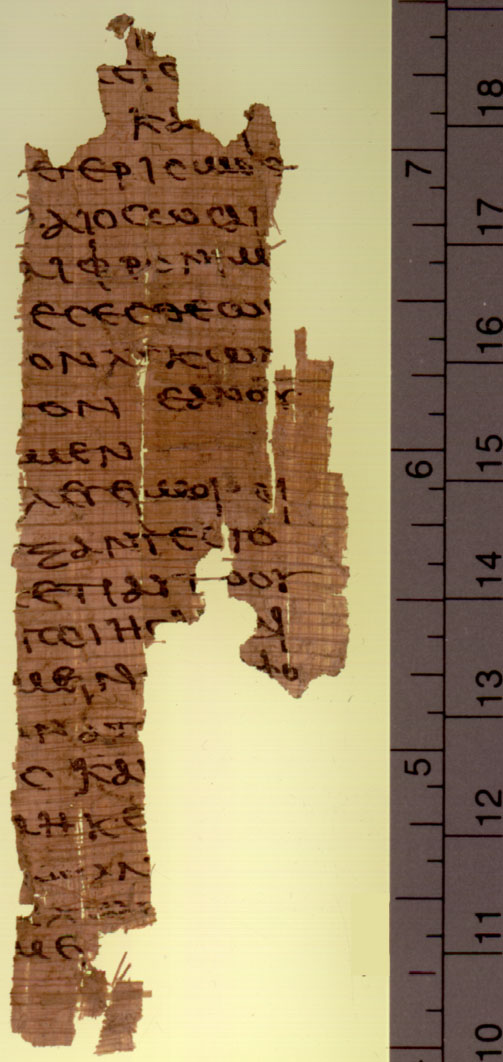
Papyrus Oxyrhynchus 4009.

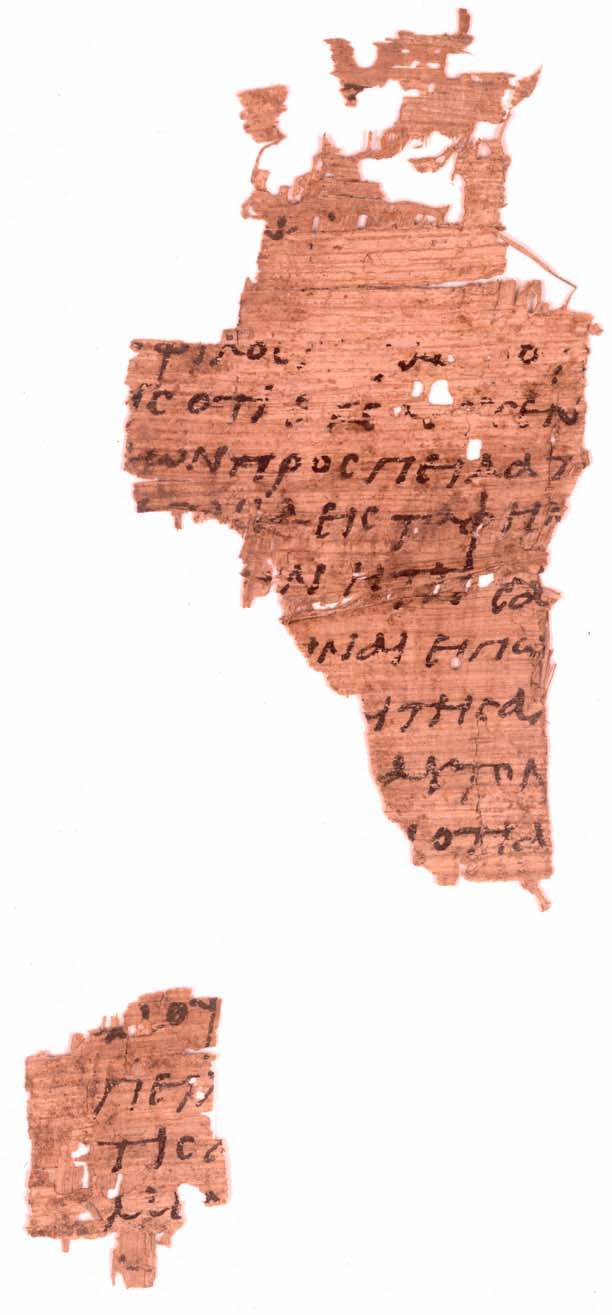
Papyrus Oxyrhynchus 2949.

The Gospel of Peter was recovered in 1886 by the French archaeologist Urbain Bouriant in the modern Egyptian city of Akhmim (60 miles (97 km) north of Nag Hammadi). The 8th- or 9th-century manuscript had been respectfully buried with an Egyptian monk. The fragmentary Gospel of Peter was the first non-canonical gospel to have been rediscovered, preserved in the dry sand of Egypt. Publication, delayed by Bouriant until 1892, occasioned intense interest. From the passion sequence that is preserved, it is clear that the gospel was a narrative gospel, but whether a complete narrative similar to the canonical gospels or simply a Passion cannot be said.

Two other papyrus fragments from Oxyrhynchus (P.Oxy 4009 and P.Oxy. 2949) were uncovered later and published in 1972. They are possibly, but not conclusively, from the Gospel of Peter and would suggest, if they belonged, that the text was more than just a passion narrative. These small fragments both seem to give first person accounts of discussions between Jesus and Peter in situations prior to the Passion week. It has also been speculated that the Fayyum Fragment may be an excerpt from the Gospel of Peter.

To date it is one of four early non-canonical narrative gospels, which exist only in fragmentary form: this Gospel of Peter, the Egerton Gospel, and the two very fragmentary Oxyrhynchus Gospels (P.Oxy. 840 and P.Oxy. 1224). The main point of interest from the first has resided in establishing its relationship to the four canonical gospels.

== Contents ==
J. Rendel Harris (1852–1941) decided to introduce the Gospel of Peter to the public in A Popular Account of the Newly-Recovered Gospel of Peter. He opens with a description of its discovery, offering his opinions regarding its date and original language. Classifying the work as a Docetic gospel, Harris defines the community in which it arose as well as its use during the Patristic age. He translates the fragment and then proceeds to discuss the sources behind it. Harris is convinced that the author borrowed from the canonical accounts, and he lists other literature that may have incorporated the Gospel of Peter, with special emphasis on the Diatessaron.

Edgar J. Goodspeed stated that the main importance of this work is that it is the first of the Christian apologies, although on the next page he admits that only "bits" actually fall into that category.

One of the chief characteristics of the work is that Pontius Pilate is exonerated of all responsibility for the Crucifixion, the onus being laid upon Herod Antipas, the scribes, and other Jews, who pointedly did not "wash their hands" like Pilate. However, the Gospel of Peter was condemned as heretical by c. 200 AD for its alleged docetic elements.

The opening leaves of the text are lost, so the Passion begins abruptly with the trial of Jesus before Pilate, after Pilate has washed his hands, and closes with its unusual and detailed version of the watch set over the tomb and the resurrection. The Gospel of Peter is more detailed in its account of the events after the Crucifixion than any of the canonical gospels, and it varies from the canonical accounts in numerous details: Herod gives the order for the execution, not Pilate, who is exonerated; Joseph (of Arimathea, which place is not mentioned) has been acquainted with Pilate; in the darkness that accompanied the crucifixion, "many went about with lamps, supposing that it was night, and fell down".

Jesus' cry from the cross, which the Gospels of Mark and Matthew give as "Eli, Eli, lama sabachthani?" which Mark and Matthew explain as meaning, "My God, my God, why hast thou forsaken me?" is reported in the Gospel of Peter as "My power, my power, thou hast forsaken me". Immediately after, Peter states that, "when he had said it, he was taken up", suggesting that Jesus did not actually die. This, together with the claim that on the cross Jesus "remained silent, as though he felt no pain", has led many early Christians to accuse the text of docetism. F. F. Bruce writes:

The docetic note in this narrative appears in the statement that Jesus, while being crucified, 'remained silent, as though he felt no pain', and in the account of his death. It carefully avoids saying that he died, preferring to say that he 'was taken up', as though he – or at least his soul or spiritual self – was 'assumed' direct from the cross to the presence of God. (We shall see an echo of this idea in the Qur'an.) Then the cry of dereliction is reproduced in a form which suggests that, at that moment, his divine power left the bodily shell in which it had taken up temporary residence.

F. F. Bruce continues:

Apart from its docetic tendency, the most striking feature of the narrative is its complete exoneration of Pilate from all responsibility for the crucifixion of Jesus. Pilate is here well on the way to the goal of canonisation which he was to attain in the Coptic Church. He withdraws from the trial after washing his hands, and Herod Antipas takes over from him, assuming the responsibility which, in Luke's passion narrative, he declined to accept. Roman soldiers play no part until they are sent by Pilate, at the request of the Jewish authorities, to provide the guard at the tomb of Jesus. The villians [sic] of the piece throughout are 'the Jews' – more particularly, the chief priests and the scribes. It is they who condemn Jesus to death and abuse him; it is they who crucify him and share out his clothes among themselves.

The account in Peter tells that the supposed writer and other disciples hid because they were being sought on suspicion of plotting to set fire to the temple, and totally rejects any possibility of their disloyalty. The centurion who kept watch at the tomb is given the name Petronius. Details of the sealing of the tomb, requested of Pilate by the elders of the Jewish community, elaborate upon Matthew 27:66: "So they went, and made the sepulchre sure, sealing the stone, and setting a watch", saying instead:

And Pilate gave them Petronius the centurion with soldiers to guard the tomb. And with them came elders and scribes to the sepulchre, and having rolled a great stone together with the centurion and the soldiers, they all who were there together set it at the door of the sepulchre; and they affixed seven seals and pitched a tent there and guarded it. And early in the morning as the Sabbath was drawing on, there came a multitude from Jerusalem and the region round about, that they might see the sepulchre that was sealed.

Most importantly, the Resurrection and Ascension, which are described in detail, are not treated as separate events, but occur on the same day:

9. And in the night in which the Lord's day was drawing on, as the soldiers kept guard two by two in a watch, there was a great voice in the heaven; and they saw the heavens opened, and two men descend with a great light and approach the tomb. And the stone that was put at the door rolled of itself and made way in part; and the tomb was opened, and both the young men entered in. 10. When therefore those soldiers saw it, they awakened the centurion and the elders, for they too were close by keeping guard. And as they declared what things they had seen, again they saw three men come forth from the tomb, and two of them supporting one, and a cross following them. And the heads of the two reached to heaven, but the head of him who was led by them overpassed the heavens. And they heard a voice from the heavens, saying, You have preached to them that sleep. And a response was heard from the cross, Yes.

The text is unusual at this point in describing the Cross itself as speaking, (Note: This is also a feature of the Gospel of the Saviour, believed to have been written in the 2nd or 3rd century.) and even moving out of the tomb. Deane Galbraith shows that the Gospel of Peter has derived its unusual description of the talking and moving cross by interpreting the first six verses of LXX Psalm 18 (Psalm 19 in the Masoretic Text) as a prophecy of Jesus' resurrection. The text then proceeds to follow the Gospel of Mark, ending at the short ending (where the women flee the empty tomb in fear), adding on an extra scene set during the Feast of Unleavened Bread, where the disciples leave Jerusalem, and ends, like the short ending, without Jesus being physically seen.

== See also ==
- Apocalypse of Peter
- Biblical canon
- Gnostic Apocalypse of Peter
- Gospel of Judas
- List of Gospels
