= Fifth gospel (genre) =

Fifth gospel is a literary genre focusing on fictional transfigurations of Jesus. The term has been coined by Theodore Ziolkowski.

According to Ziolkowski, in "fictional transfigurations of Jesus" "the characters and the action, irrespective of meaning or theme, are prefigured to a noticeable extent by figures and events popularly associated with the life of Jesus as it is known from the Gospels."

Books in this genre include Lars Görling's 491, Gunter Grass's Cat and Mouse, John Barth's Giles Goat-Boy and Gore Vidal's Messiah and Live from Golgotha.

== See also ==
- Gospel
- Gospel (genre)
- The Fifth Gospel
- The Gospel of Afranius
