= Live from Golgotha: The Gospel According to Gore Vidal =

Novel by Gore Vidal

Live from Golgotha
- Cover of the first edition
- Author: Gore Vidal
- Genre: Comedy
- Publisher: Random House
- Publication date: September 1, 1992
- Media type: Print
- Pages: 232
- ISBN: 978-0-679-41611-1

Live from Golgotha is a novel by Gore Vidal, an irreverent spoof of the New Testament. Told from the perspective of Saint Timothy as he travels with Saint Paul, the 1992 novel's narrative shifts in time as Timothy and Paul combat a mysterious hacker from the future who is deleting all traces of Christianity.

The title of the novel alludes to the fact that the author "made sport of the notion of television coverage of the Crucifixion, as the kind of thing that would happen only in contemporary America". The author has been called a "blasphemer" for portraying "Saint Paul as a huckster and pederast and Jesus a buffoon". John Rechy reviewing the novel for the Los Angeles Times wrote that "If God exists and Jesus is His son, then Gore Vidal is going to hell". Christopher Hitchens described the book as a "masterpiece of blasphemous vulgarity".

The book is Vidal's twenty-second novel and a fifth novel focused on the topic of religion, the others being Messiah (1954), Julian (1964), Kalki (1978), and Creation (1981), and the second of Vidal's novels that fit in the fifth gospel genre.

== Development ==
In Vidal's memoir, Point to Point Navigation, he says that the book was originally titled Live from Golgotha and that the subtitle, "The Gospel According to Gore Vidal", was added by the book cover's designer without Vidal's permission.

The book was published by Random House in 1992.

== Plot ==
In the year 96 of the Common Era, the bishop of Ephesus, Timothy, is visited in a dream by his ancient teacher Saint Paul, who foretells him that he has been chosen by the men of the future to write the story of Jesus after the other gospels of the New Testament have been deleted from existence by a mysterious hacker. As a gift he also receives a large-screen television, on which he picks up the programs of the future.

Timothy embarks on his work, starting his story with the admission that since at the age of 15 he became aide (and lover) of Paul of Tarsus, who took him with him on his proselytizing journeys. In each city they visited they managed to found a community of "Christians" and unlike the apostles, Paul had taken on the task of bringing the good news to non-Jews.

Arriving in Philippi, they contact a couple of local proselytes, Priscilla and her husband Aquila, convincing them to go with them to the city of Ephesus, one of the largest in the eastern part of the Roman Empire. Here Paul, Timothy and Priscilla work well to steal faithful and economic income from the temple of Artemis.

While at work to write his gospel, the elder Timothy occasionally receives visits from travelers from the future, which in the novel is called Tivulandia. He is promised that he will be the anchorman of the planned direct TV broadcast from Golgotha dedicated to the crucifixion.

Timothy's account picks up on Ephesus and his attempt to free himself from his relationship with Paul. In fact, he fell in love with Stefania, one of the priestesses of the temple. The growth of the church in Ephesus is so whirlwind that it is arousing the ire of traditional religion. Timothy and Paul then go to Jerusalem, where an almost incurable conflict is underway with the Jewish followers of Jesus, led by James, the younger brother of Christ. James' faction has little interest in the spread of preaching among non-Jews. However, all take for literal Jesus' words about his forthcoming return to earth and the universal judgment; James and his followers, however, believe that Christ is the Messiah announced by the holy scriptures, not the son of God.

The Orthodox Jews provoke a fight, Paul is involved; accused of inciting sedition against Rome, he appeals invoking his citizenship and asks to be judged in the city rather than by the governor of Palestine, Felix. In reality, for him it is a way of scrounging a passage by sea to Italy at the expense of the state. Timothy and Paul therefore leave together. Meanwhile, Timothy continues to receive visits from travelers from the future, and in Tivulandia there are several factions interested in rewriting the past. In particular, technological progress is expected to allow not only the holographic projection of the image back in time, but also the physical journey itself.

In Rome the two Christians come into contact with the environment of the imperial court. Nero seems well disposed towards their religion (Paul hopes that he can even convert the emperor); meanwhile Caesar, who is bisexual, seems very interested in Timothy who cannot escape his attentions. In Rome, unfortunately, things start going badly for Christians: Paul's lawyers fail their appeals and he is condemned. Furthermore, the fire in Rome causes an uprising against Christians. Paul is executed together with Peter the Apostle, who has been in Rome for even longer to spread the good news.

Timothy returns to Thessalonica, where he will become bishop. Meanwhile, visits from the future are multiplying, and things get complicated when a video shot in the garden of Gethsemane is publicized: you see Jesus addressing Timothy on the arrival of the soldiers who came to arrest him against Judas Iscariot's accusations of being the alleged prophet. The soldiers arrest the apostle while Jesus is taken into the future. There he becomes a great software expert and the hacker who is erasing all traces of the Gospels; disgusted by the fact that St. Paul has spread his Word to non-Jews, to whom it was originally addressed according to his intentions, he is now in fact determined to erase Christianity from existence.

From the point of view of future travelers, however, if Judas is crucified in his place, many problems arise: as regards the doctrine, perhaps nothing would change, since even St. Paul is not aware of the fact. However, since it is a live TV broadcast, it would appear that the man on the cross is disproportionately fat (Judas weighs almost two quintals). Everyone conspires to ensure that Jesus is rightly put on the cross, when he returns in time to witness his own (false) execution; he is then denounced by Timothy to Pontius Pilate, and the story ends in the "right way" with Christianity saved – although in fact, the religion has been changed, as at the moment of Jesus's televised death above his cross appears the image of a blazing sun, in the centre of which is seated the Japanese goddess Amaterasu. The new post-broadcast logo for Christianity becomes a cross within the circle of the sun.

== Reception ==
The book has been described as "satirising the weaknesses and hypocrisies of the present" and a "satiric post-modernish confection". John Rechy, reviewing the novel for the Los Angeles Times, wrote that "If God exists and Jesus is His son, then Gore Vidal is going to hell", also observing that "his novel reveals Vidal at his satirical best, and, alas, at his most self-indulgent", and concluding that "the last fifth of this novel is a gem, its last page uproarious." Christopher Hitchens described the book as a "masterpiece of blasphemous vulgarity".

Heather Neilson noted that the novel is Vidal's fifth religious-themed novel and second to fit in the fifth gospel genre. She notes that the Vidal "deconstruct[s] the Christian doctrine of the necessity of the crucifixion of the historical Jesus for the salvation of humankind" and summarizes the novel as a "light-hearted spoof".

Gary Krist commented that the book is part of Vidal's "satiric comedies", but although describing himself as "an unapologetic fan of Gore Vidal", found the entire series "overdone, uncertain of purpose, and just not very funny", and the book in question, "over the map... lame and sophomoric, hinting at desperation to entertain at all cost".

Don Fletcher and Kate Feros described the novel as "a clever and complex attack on Christian morality" but criticize Vidal for a confusing message about homosexuality.

== See also ==
- The Gospel of Afranius
