= Gospel of the Four Heavenly Realms =

Lost apochryphal New Testament text

The Gospel of the Four Heavenly Realms is a lost text from the New Testament apocrypha.

The content has been surmised from various descriptions of it in ancient works by Church Fathers. It is thought to be a gnostic text, in which aspects of their esoteric cosmology were expounded, probably framed in the form of a dialogue between Jesus and the Apostles.

== See also ==
- List of Gospels
