= Martianus =

Martianus may refer to:

- Martianus Capella (fl. c. 410–420), Latin writer, author of On the Marriage of Philology and Mercury
- Icelus Martianus (died 69), adviser to the Roman emperor Galba

== See also ==
- Marcian (disambiguation)
