= Gospel of Andrew =

Gospel mentioned by Innocent I and Augustine

The Gospel of Andrew is a gospel mentioned by Innocent I and Augustine. It is perhaps identical with the Acts of Andrew.

== See also ==
- List of Gospels
