= Papyrus Oxyrhynchus 210 =

Greek papyrus fragment

Papyrus Oxyrhynchus 210 (P. Oxy. 210 or P. Oxy. II 210) is an early Christian fragment, written in Greek. It was discovered in Oxyrhynchus. The manuscript was written on papyrus in the form of a codex. It is dated to the third century. Currently it is housed in the Cambridge University Library (4048) in Cambridge.

== Description ==
The document was written by an unknown author. The measurements of the fragment are 173 by 85 mm. The text is related to Matthew 7:17-19 and Luke 6:43-44 (a tree is known by its fruits). Probably the fragment is from a non-canonical Gospel. It is not usually included in compendia of New Testament apocrypha (although it appears in Dieter Lührmann's and Egbert Schlab's Fragmente Apokryph gewordener Evangelien in griechischer und lateinischer Sprache).

It was discovered by Grenfell and Hunt in 1897 in Oxyrhynchus. The text was published by Grenfell and Hunt in 1899.

== See also ==
- Oxyrhynchus Papyri
- Oxyrhynchus Gospels
- Papyrus Oxyrhynchus 209
- Papyrus Oxyrhynchus 211
