= Gospel of the Seventy =

Lost Christian text

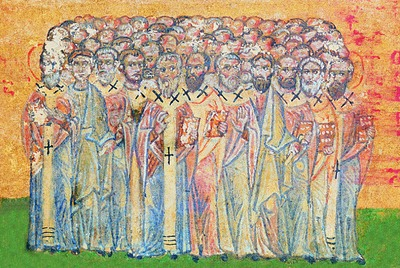
Seventy Disciples, Greek, 15th century

The Gospel of the Seventy is a lost text from the New Testament apocrypha. The title of the text refers to the number of disciples sent by Jesus to preach in Luke's Gospel (quoted in some manuscripts as 72).

The only surviving reference to the text is in the writings of al-Biruni.

The Manicheans appear to have referred to the Gospel of Mani by this title, and as such it may be the same text, Ibn al-Nadim regarded it as an obvious forgery, and the text, according to him, as attributed to one "Balāmīs", and begins by saying it was written down by Abd Allah ibn Salam at the request of Salman the Persian.

== See also ==
- List of Gospels
- Non-canonical books referenced in the Bible
- Seventy Disciples
