= Marcian of Rhossos =

Marcian of Rhossos (Greek: Μαρκιανός; fl. 2nd century) was the leader of a Docetic sect of Christianity at Rhossos, only known as the alleged author of the Gospel of Peter. He may possibly be the same person as Marcion of Sinope, a similarly Docetic heretic in the second century.

Eusebius' Church History is the only source about Marcian. Eusebius writes in it that Bishop Serapion of Antioch had been informed that a Christian community in Rhosus was using the Gospel of Peter in their liturgy and had sent a letter authorising them to do so, while also denying that such a Gospel was actually written by Saint Peter. Serapion was later taught, however, that the Gospel of Peter "hid a heresy" that he attributed to Marcian and that he was leader of a sect which followed docetism. Serapion claims that he diligently read the Gospel and was able to "to find, along with much of the Savior's true doctrine". Jerome mistakenly says in his De Viris Illustribus that Serapion wrote the Gospel of Peter.

Marcian has been suggested to be identical with the archheretic Marcion of Sinope, a similarly docetic heretic active at around the same time. However, the main case against Marcion's authorship is that Marcion believed that Saint Peter and the other apostles didn’t truly understand Jesus's true message.
