= Gospel of the Saviour =

2nd- or 3rd-century Gnostic Christian text

The Gospel of the Saviour is a fragmentary Coptic text from an otherwise unknown gospel that has joined the New Testament apocrypha. It consists of a fragmentary fire-damaged parchment codex that was acquired by the Egyptian Museum of Berlin in 1961 (accessioned as Papyrus Berolinensis 22220). Its nature was only discovered in 1991, when it came round to being described (the sheer number of similar manuscripts being described causing the 30-year delay), and was revealed in a 1996 lecture by Charles W. Hedrick.

== Translations and formats ==
It has been edited and translated into English by Hedrick and Paul Mirecki (Hedrick and Mirecki 1999) and by Bart D. Ehrman (Ehrman 2003). The fragmentary nature of the text admits of more than one sequential ordering of the contents, giving rise to more than one useful translation, and some public discussion (see § Bibliography).

== Date, origin and style ==
The manuscript appears to date from the 6th century; Hellenisms in the vocabulary and grammar suggest that it was translated from a lost Greek original. (Note: This is a well-attested technique in textual criticism) The hypothetic original Greek text on which it is based is thought to have been composed somewhere in the late second or early third century, judging from the theology and style. The Gospel is not a narrative but a dialogue, a form often chosen in Antiquity for didactic material. Alin Suciu has argued that the Gospel of the Saviour is not in fact a gospel but rather belongs to the Coptic genre of "apostolic memoir" and was written after the Council of Chalcedon in 451.

== Gnostic themes ==
The content is heavily Gnostic in that salvation is available only to those who understand the secret knowledge (gnosis), and also shows parallels with the Gospel of Peter, in that the significance of the Crucifixion is somewhat watered down, being considered a part of a heavenly journey, an idea much more in keeping with a Gnostic world-view. The unnamed Saviour (assumed to be Jesus) engages in a dialogue with his apostles that is somewhat more personal than is found elsewhere. And at one point, the cross itself is addressed, as if it is a living creature, a companion rather than a device for death. (Note: The literary trope of the speaking Cross, a form of prosopopoeia, is probably most familiar to readers of English in The Dream of the Rood. It is also a feature of the Gospel of Peter, usually dated to the 2nd century.)

== See also ==
- List of Gospels

== Bibliography ==
- Charles W. Hedrick and Paul A. Mirecki, 1999. Gospel of the Savior: A New Ancient Gospel (Santa Rosa, California: Polebridge Press) ISBN 0-944344-68-2
- Stephen Emmel, 2002. "The Recently Published Gospel of the Savior ("unbekanntes Berliner Evangelium"): Righting the Order of Pages and Events", in Harvard Theological Review 95, pp 45–72.
- Charles W. Hedrick, 2003. "Caveats to a "Righted Order" of the Gospel of the Savior", in Harvard Theological Review 96, pp 229–238.
- Bart D. Ehrman, 2003. Lost Scriptures: books that did not make it into the New Testament (Oxford University Press). ISBN 0-19-514182-2
- Wolfgang Kosack, Novum Testamentum Coptice. Neues Testament, Bohairisch, ediert von Wolfgang Kosack. Novum Testamentum, Bohairice, curavit Wolfgang Kosack. / Wolfgang Kosack. neue Ausgabe, Christoph Brunner, Basel 2014. ISBN 978-3-906206-04-2.
- Suciu, Alin (2017). The Berlin-Strasbourg Apocryphon: A Coptic Apostolic Memoir. Mohr Siebeck. ISBN 978-3-16-155106-2.
