= Theodore Ziolkowski =

American scholar (1932–2020)

- Born: Theodore J. Ziolkowski; September 30, 1932; Birmingham, Alabama, U.S.
- Died: December 5, 2020 (aged 88); Bethlehem, Pennsylvania, U.S.
- Occupation: Educator
- Spouse: Yetta Goldstein (m. 1951)
- Children: 2, including Jan
- Awards: James Russell Lowell Prize; Henry Allen Moe Prize

Academic background
- Education: Duke University (A.B., A.M.); Yale University (PhD)

Academic work
- Discipline: German studies; comparative literature
- Institutions: Yale University; Columbia University; Princeton University

Dean of Princeton University Graduate School
- In office 1979–1992
- Preceded by: Nina Garsoïan
- Succeeded by: Albert J. Raboteau

Theodore Ziolkowski (September 30, 1932 – December 5, 2020) was a scholar in the fields of German studies and comparative literature. He coined the term "fifth gospel genre".

== Early life ==
Theodore J. Ziolkowski was born on September 30, 1932, in Birmingham, Alabama, to Cecilia (née Jankowski) and Mieczysław Ziółkowski, second-generation and first-generation Polish immigrants to the United States. He received a Bachelor of Arts from Duke University in 1951, a Master of Arts from Duke University in 1952 and, following studies at the University of Innsbruck on a Fulbright Fellowship, his Ph.D. from Yale University in 1957.

== Personal life ==
Ziolkowski married Yetta Goldstein in 1951. Together they had two sons, Jan and Eric.

== Career ==
The connection of literature, religion, and law constituted his work. Following appointments at Yale University and Columbia University, he was called to Princeton University as professor of German in 1964. In 1969, he was appointed Class of 1900 Professor of German and Comparative Literature and, from 1979 to 1992, Dean of the Graduate School. From 2001 to his death, he was professor emeritus. A past president of the Modern Language Association (1985) and visiting professor at several universities (Yale University, City University of New York, Rutgers University, the University of Bristol, LMU Munich, Leuphana University of Lüneburg), he received many awards for his books and honors in the United States and abroad, including the Goethe-Medaille of the Goethe-Institut, the Jacob-und-Wilhelm Grimm Preis (DAAD), the Forschungspreis of the Alexander von Humboldt Foundation, the Bundesverdienstkreuz (1. Klasse) of the Federal Republic of Germany, and the D.Phil.h.c. from the University of Greifswald.

He was a member of the American Philosophical Society and the American Academy of Arts and Sciences. He was also a corresponding member of the Austrian Akademie der Wissenschaften, the Göttingen Akademie der Wissenschaften, and the Deutsche Akademie fur Sprache und Dichtung.

== Awards ==
He received the James Russell Lowell Prize and the Henry Allen Moe Prize in the Humanities of the American Philosophical Society.

== Death ==
Ziolkowski died in Kirkland Village, in Bethlehem, Pennsylvania, on December 5, 2020.

== Works ==
- 1964. Hermann Broch
- 1965. The Novels of Hermann Hesse: Themes and Structures
- 1966. Hermann Hesse
- 1969. Dimensions of the Modern Novel: German Texts and European Contexts
- 1972. Fictional Transfigurations of Jesus (James Russell Lowell Prize of MLA)
- 1973, ed. Hesse: A Collection of Critical Essays.
- 1976, ed.Hermann Hesse: My Belief. Essays on Life and Art
- 1977. Disenchanted Images: A Literary Iconology
- 1979. Der Schriftsteller Hermann Hesse
- 1980. The Classical German Elegy, 1795–1950
- 1983. Varieties of Literary Thematics
- 1990. German Romanticism and Its Institutions
- 1991, ed. Soul of the Age: Letters of Hermann Hesse.
- 1993. Virgil and the Moderns.
- 1997. The Mirror of Justice: Literary Reflections of Legal Crises (Christian Gauss Award of Phi Beta Kappa).
- 1998. The View from the Tower. Origins of an Antimodernist Image. ISBN 0-691-05907-1
- 1998. Das Wunderjahr in Jena: Geist und Gesellschaft, 1794/95
- 2000. The Sin of Knowledge: Ancient Themes and Modern Variations.
- 2002. Berlin: Aufstieg einer Kulturmetropole um 1810
- 2004. Clio the Romantic Muse: Historicizing the Faculties in Germany (Barricelli Prize of International Conference on Romanticism)
- 2004. Hesitant Heroes: Private Inhibition, Cultural Crisis.
- 2005. Ovid and the Moderns (Robert Motherwell Award of Dedalus Foundation)
- 2006. Vorboten der Moderne: Eine Kulturgeschichte der Fruehromantik
- 2006, ed. Friedrich Dürrenmatt: Selected Works: Vol. 2 Fiction
- 2007 Modes of Faith: Secular Surrogates for Lost Religious Belief
- 2008 Minos and the Moderns: Cretan Myth in Twentieth-Century Literature and Art
- 2008 Mythologisierte Gegenwart: Deutsches Erleben seit 1933 in antikem Gewand
- 2009 Heidelberger Romantik: Mythos und Symbol
- 2009 Scandal on Stage: European Theater as Moral Trial
- 2010 Die Welt im Gedicht. Rilkes Sonette an Orpheus II.4
- 2010 Dresdner Romantik: Politik und Harmonie
- 2011, ed. Peter Hacks: Senecas Tod
- 2011 Gilgamesh among Us: Modern Encounters with the Ancient Epic
- 2013 Lure of the Arcane: The Literature of Cult and Conspiracy
- 2015 Classicism of the Twenties: Art, Music, and Literature
- 2015 The Alchemist in Literature: From Dante to the Present
- 2016 Uses and Abuses of Moses: Literary Representations since the Enlightenment
- 2017 Music into Fiction: Composers Writing, Compositions Imitated
- 2018 Stages of European Romanticism: Cultural Synchronicity in the Arts, 1798-1848
- 2020 Roman Poets in Modern Guise: The Reception of Roman Poetry since World War I
