= Charles W. Hedrick =

American scholar of early Christianity

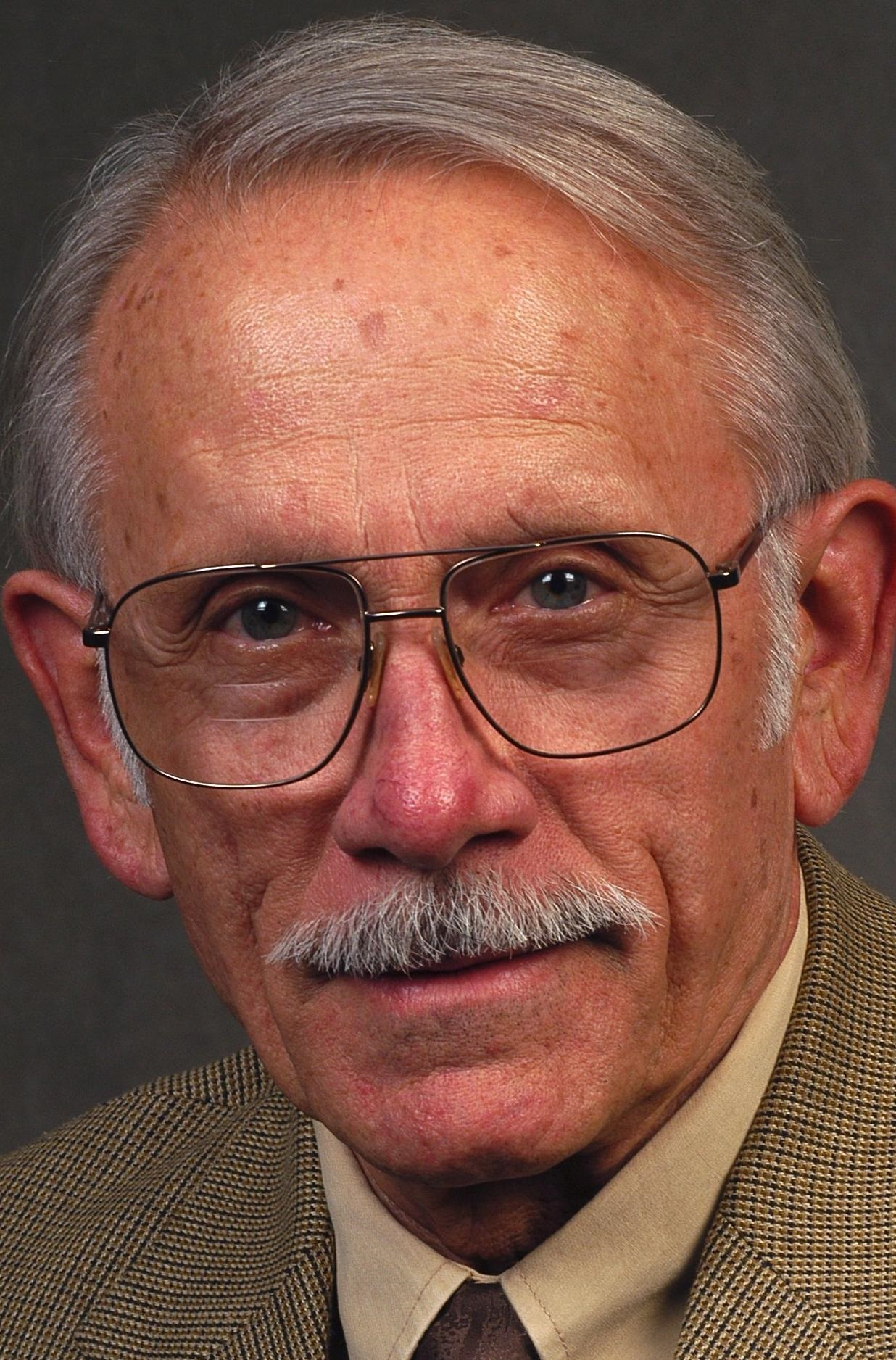
- Born: 1934 (age 91–92); Louisiana, USA

Academic background
- Education: Mississippi College in Clinton (B.A); Golden Gate Southern Baptist Seminary in Mill Valley, California (Bachelor of Divinity); University of Southern California (M.A )
- Alma mater: Claremont Graduate School (PhD)
- Thesis: The Apocalypse of Adam: A Literary and Source Analysis (1977)
- Doctoral advisor: James M. Robinson; Burton Mack; Ekkard Muhlenberg; George MacRae

Academic work
- Institutions: Missouri State University
- Main interests: Early Christianity, Christian origins, and Gnosticism

Charles W. Hedrick (born 1934) is an American scholar of early Christianity, Christian origins, and Gnosticism. He is Distinguished Emeritus Professor of Religious Studies at Missouri State University, where he taught from 1980 until his retirement in 2004. He was a member of the international UNESCO team that reconstructed and translated the Nag Hammadi Codices in Cairo.

His research focuses on study of the parables of Jesus, the Gospel of Thomas, and Coptic Gnostic texts.

== Biography ==
Hedrick was born in Bogalusa, Louisiana and raised in Mississippi and began his higher education at Mississippi College in Clinton, earning a B.A. in Bible with minors in history and Latin in 1958. He continued his theological studies at Golden Gate Southern Baptist Seminary in Mill Valley, California, receiving a Bachelor of Divinity in 1962. He served as pastor of Mayersville Baptist Church while he was an undergraduate student at Mississippi College.

While in seminary, Hedrick served as pastor of the First Baptist Church in San Geronimo Valley, California.

In 1965, Hedrick began his career in public service as a deputy probation officer with the Los Angeles County Juvenile Probation Department, a position he held for thirteen years while pursuing graduate studies.

He earned an M.A. in New Testament from the University of Southern California in 1968 with a thesis on Rudolf Bultmann’s eschatology under Eldon J. Epp. He then joined the Institute for Antiquity and Christianity in Claremont, California, where he served as research assistant, office manager of the Coptic Project, and later as research associate between 1969 and 1976.

Hedrick completed his Ph.D. in Religion (New Testament) at Claremont Graduate School in 1977. His dissertation, The Apocalypse of Adam: A Literary and Source Analysis, was supervised by James M. Robinson, Burton Mack, Ekkard Muhlenberg, and George MacRae of Harvard Divinity School.

He lectured at Claremont Graduate School from 1977 to 1978 before joining Wagner College in Staten Island, New York, as an assistant professor of religious studies.

In 1980, Hedrick began his long tenure at Southwest Missouri State University (now Missouri State University), where he advanced from assistant professor to associate professor and then professor of religious studies. He was named Distinguished Scholar in 1996, Distinguished Professor in 2001, and Distinguished Professor Emeritus upon his retirement in 2004.

In addition to his academic pursuits, Hedrick had a notable career as a chaplain in the U.S. Army Reserve. He attained the rank of colonel before retiring in 1994 and was awarded the Legion of Merit for his service. His military tenure included active duty during Operation Desert Shield and Operation Desert Storm in 1991, as well as an assignment as Individual Mobilization Augmentee in the Office of the Chief of Chaplains at the Pentagon between 1988 and 1993.

== Research and scholarly works ==
Hedrick’s research centers on Christian origins, the Gospels, and Gnosticism. His first major work, Parables as Poetic Fictions (1994), challenged traditional interpretations of Jesus’ parables by treating them as literary fictions rather than historical allegories or metaphors. His book When History and Faith Collide (1999) explored the challenges of reconstructing Jesus of Nazareth as a historical figure.

His later book, Many Things in Parables (2004), advanced a consistent theory for a literary approach to parables, intended for both scholars and non-specialists.

Hedrick has also contributed to the study of the Nag Hammadi codices, Gnosticism, and early Christian texts, with works such as Unlocking the Secrets of the Gospel According to Thomas and The Wisdom of Jesus. His research continues to explore the boundaries between faith, history, and early Christian traditions.

He has edited several volumes, such as Gospel Origins and Christian Beginnings and Gnosticism and the Early Christian World, both in honor of his mentor James M. Robinson.

== Selected bibliography ==
=== Selected books ===
- Hedrick, Charles W. (2005). The Apocalypse of Adam: a literary and source analysis. Ancient Texts and Translations. Eugene, Oregon: Wipf & Stock. ISBN 978-1-59752-386-8.
- Hedrick, Charles W. (1994). Parables as poetic fictions: the creative voice of Jesus. Peabody, Mass: Hendrickson Publishers. ISBN 978-0-913573-90-7.
- "Gospel of the Savior: A New Ancient Gospel by Hedrick, Charles W. and Paul A. Mirecki (eds./trans.): Very Good Hardcover (1999) 1st Edition | Atlantic Bookshop". www.abebooks.com.
- Hedrick, Charles W. (2013-02-05). When History and Faith Collide: Studying Jesus. Wipf and Stock Publishers. ISBN 978-1-62032-861-3.
- Hedrick, Charles W. (2004-01-01). Many Things in Parables: Jesus and His Modern Critics. Westminster John Knox Press. ISBN 978-0-664-22427-1.
- Hedrick, Charles W. (January 2009). House of Faith or Enchanted Forest?: American Popular Belief in an Age of Reason: Charles W. Hedrick: 9781606080061: Amazon.com: Books. Wipf and Stock Publishers. ISBN 978-1606080061.
- Hedrick, Charles W. (2008). When Faith Meets Reason: Religion Scholars Reflect on Their Spiritual Journeys. Polebridge Press. ISBN 978-1-59815-010-0.
- Hedrick, Charles W. (2010). Unlocking the secrets of the gospel according to Thomas: a radical faith for a new age. Eugene, Or: Cascade Books. ISBN 978-1-55635-239-3.
- Hedrick, Charles W. (2017-04-27). The Wisdom of Jesus. The Lutterworth Press. doi:10.2307/j.ctvz0hc9c. ISBN 978-0-227-90629-3.
- Hedrick, Charles W. (2019-01-11). Unmasking Biblical Faiths: The Marginal Relevance of the Bible for Contemporary Religious Faith. Wipf and Stock Publishers. ISBN 978-1-5326-1303-6.

== Selected edited books ==
- Gospel origins & Christian beginnings : in honor of James M. Robinson. Internet Archive. Sonoma, Calif. : Polebridge Press. 1990. ISBN 978-0-944344-15-6.
- Gnosticism & the early Christian world: in honor of James M. Robinson. Forum fascicles. Sonoma, Calif: Polebridge Pr. 1990. ISBN 978-0-944344-16-3.
- Hedrick, Charles W. (1990-01-01). Nag Hammadi Codices XI, XII, XIII. BRILL. doi:10.1163/9789004438958. ISBN 978-90-04-43895-8.
- Hedrick, Charles W.; Hodgson, Robert (2005-10-17). Nag Hammadi, Gnosticism, and Early Christianity. Wipf and Stock Publishers. ISBN 978-1-59752-402-5.

== Selected journal articles ==
- Hedrick, Charles W (2003). "The Secret Gospel of Mark: Stalemate in the Academy". Journal of Early Christian Studies. 11 (2): 133–145. doi:10.1353/earl.2003.0026. ISSN 1086-3184.
- Hedrick, Charles W. (1979-01-01), "NHC V,4: The (Second) Apocalypse of James", Nag Hammadi Codices V, 2-5 and VI with Papyrus Berolinensis 8502, 1 and 4, Brill, pp. 105–149, ISBN 978-90-04-43885-9
- Quispel, Gilles; Hedrick, C. W.; Hodgson, Robert (1988). "Nag Hammadi, Gnosticism and Early Christianity". Vigiliae Christianae. 42 (2): 198. doi:10.2307/1583924. ISSN 0042-6032. JSTOR 1583924.
- Hedrick, Charles W. (2002). "Newly Identified Fragments of Coptic Acts and the Apocalypse". Journal of Coptic Studies. 4: 127–132. doi:10.2143/JCS.4.0.503623.
- Hedrick, Charles W. 1934-. "Evaluating Morton Smith: Hoaxer outed or colleague slandered?". ixtheo.de.
- Hedrick, Charles W. (2006). "Vestiges of an Ancient Coptic Codex Containing a Psalms Testimonia and a Gospel Homily". Journal of Coptic Studies. 8: 1–41. doi:10.2143/JCS.8.0.2017902.
