= Marsien =

Motor vehicle

Marc Philipp Gemballa Marsien

Overview
- Manufacturer: Marc Philipp Gemballa GmbH
- Model years: 2022–present
- Assembly: Neckar, Germany

Body and chassis
- Class: Sports car (S)
- Body style: 2-door coupe
- Layout: Rear-engine, all-wheel drive

Powertrain
- Engine: 3.7 L twin-turbocharged flat-6
- Transmission: 8-speed DCT

Dimensions
- Wheelbase: 2,520 mm (99.2 in)
- Length: 4,055 mm (159.6 in)
- Width: 1,905 mm (75.0 in)
- Height: 1,200 mm (47.2 in)
- Curb weight: 1,590 kg (3,505 lb)

The Marc Philipp Gemballa Marsien is a sports car produced by Marc Philipp Gemballa GmbH based on the Porsche 992 Turbo S.

== Overview ==
Marc Philipp Gemballa, the son of Uwe Gemballa, who founded a tuning company in 1981, presented as managing director of Marc Philipp Gemballa GmbH the Marsien, a sports car limited to 40 off-road vehicles in July 2021. It had its public premiere a month later as part of Monterey Car Week. The car is inspired by the rally version of the Porsche 959. In its normal state, the Marsien has a ground clearance of 12 centimetres, but this can be hydraulically increased to 25 centimeters in off-road mode. The chassis is a custom-made product specially developed for the vehicle by KW Automotive . It has a double wishbone suspension at the front and a multi-link suspension at the rear. The vehicle is named after the red sand deserts in the United Arab Emirates, where the Marsien was tested as a Project Sandbox. The development team reminded these deserts of the surface of the planet Mars.

== Specifications ==
The Marsien is powered by the 3.7-liter boxer engine that came from the 911 Turbo S, which has been upgraded to 551 kW (750 hp) by Ruf Automobile. The Marsien accelerates to 100 km/h (62 mph) in 2.6 seconds and has a top speed of 335 km/h (208 mph).
