= Gospel of the Lots of Mary =

Manuscript used for divination

The Gospel of the Lots of Mary is a Coptic writing dating to the fifth or sixth century used for divination or bibliomancy. It contains 37 answers to questions (lots (Note: Coptic: ⲕⲗⲏⲣⲟⲥ, Greek: klêros.)), though the methods for readers to select an answer are unclear. Its production and retrieval sites are unknown, though it may have been written near Antinoë in Upper Egypt, and it may have an earlier Greek edition from the fourth century.

== Description ==
The Gospel of the Lots of Mary is a small, 75 by 67 millimetres (3.0 in × 2.6 in), manuscript or booklet written in the Coptic language. It contains 37 answers to questions, which unusually begin on the left (rather than right) page when the booklet is opened. The precise purpose of the manuscript is unknown, but because the answers are (inconsistently) numbered 1–37, it is likely a text used for divination or bibliomancy; (Note: Similar divination texts include the Sortes Sanctorum, the Sortes Astrampsychi, and the Sortes Barbarinianae (a simpler version of the Sortes Astrampsychi).) due to its size, it may have been for personal use. However, some of the answers are so generic that the manuscript may be used for the reader to develop piety. (Note: Wisniewski 2020, pp. 131–132, gives the example of the third oracle answer, regarding sin: "Do you not remember what has happened to you before today? And God saved you from everything. Do not (re)turn to this matter.") It may have been uniquely popular among women due to its title, though the answers are not exclusive to questions women were likely to ask. Its connection to its namesake, Mary, mother of Jesus, are not clear, though it includes several references to her and the archangel Gabriel.

The most complete text dates to the fifth or sixth century, though there may be an earlier, fourth-century Greek original from the fourth century. While neither its production nor retrieval sites are known, it may have been written near Antinoë in Upper Egypt, which had a cult for Saint Colluthus; seventh-century fragments from oracles found in Antinoë closely match the text of the Gospel of the Lots of Mary. As of 2018, the text is at Harvard's Sackler Library. The first translation was published in 2014 by AnneMarie Luijendijk.

== Notes and references ==
=== Works cited ===
- Childers, Jeff W. (2020). Divining gospel: Oracles of interpretation in a Syriac manuscript of John. Manuscripta Biblica. De Gruyter. ISBN 9783110643497.
- Gardner, Iain (2015). "Forbidden Oracles? The Gospel of the Lots of Mary". Vigiliae Christianae. 69 (5): 567–570. doi:10.1163/15700720-12341241.
- Hidding, Aaltje (2020). The era of the martyrs: Remembering the great persecution in late antique Egypt. Millennium-Studien. De Gruyter. ISBN 9783110689686.
- Kochar, Alexander (2018). "Oxyrhynchus and oracles in late antiquity". In Luijendijk, AnneMarie; Klingshirn, William (eds.). My lots are in thy hands: Sortilege and its practitioners in late antiquity. Religions in the Graeco-Roman World. Brill. ISBN 9789004385030.
- Wisniewski, Robert (2020). Christian divination in late antiquity. Social worlds of late antiquity and the early Middle Ages. Amsterdam University Press. ISBN 9789048541010.
