= If the War Goes On ... =

Book of writings by Hermann Hesse

If the War Goes On: Reflections on War and Politics is a series of essays and other writings by the German-born Swiss author Hermann Hesse. It covers the period 1914 to 1948. Much of the book is critical of war and the German war effort, yet contains multifaceted accounts of various Germans who resisted war (especially Nazism).

== Essays ==
- O Freunde, nicht diese Töne! (September 1914)
- To a Cabinet Minister (August 1917)
- If the War Goes On Another Two Years (End of 1917)
- Christmas (December 1917)
- Shall There Be Peace? (December 1917)
- If the War Goes On Another Five Years (Early in 1918)
- The European (January 1918)
- Dream after Work (March 1918)
- War and Peace (Summer 1918)
- History (November 1918)
- The Reich (December 1918)
- The Path of Love (December 1918)
- Self-Will (1919)
- Zarathustra's Return (1919)
- Letter to a Young German (1919)
- Thou Shalt Not Kill (1919)
- Thoughts About China (1921)
- World Crisis and Books (1937)
- Page from a Notebook (1940)
- End of the Rigi-Journal (August 1945)
- Speech after Midnight (1946)
- Letter to Adele (1946)
- A Letter to Germany (1946)
- Message to the Nobel Prize Banquet (1946)
- Words of Moralizing Thanks (1946)
- To a Young Colleague in Japan (1948)
- An Attempt at Justification (1948)
- On Romain Rolland (1948)
