= Fayyum Fragment =

3rd-century Christian gospel manuscript

The Fayyum Fragment (Papyrus Vindobonensis Greek 2325 [P. Vienna G. 2325]) is a papyrus fragment containing text that could be from part of the New Testament, and consists of only about 100 Greek letters. The fragment was originally discovered in Al-Fayyum, Egypt, and was translated in 1885 by Gustav Bickell after it was found in the papyrus collection of Archduke Rainer Joseph of Austria in Vienna.

The surviving manuscript is badly damaged and has fewer than a hundred Greek letters preserved. Because of its style of handwriting it is believed to have been copied around the end of the third century. The text seems to parallel Mark 14:26–31, appearing to present a more abbreviated account. It is unclear whether the fragment is an abridged version of the synoptic gospels, or a source text on which they were based, perhaps the apocryphal Gospel of Peter.

== Text ==
Papyrus Vindobonensis 2325
Greek
...ε]ξαγειν ως ε[ι]πε[ν] οτι, Α[παντες]
[εν ταυτη] τη νυκτι σκανδαλισ[θησεσ-]
[θε κατα] το γραφεν· Παταξω τον [ποιμε-]
[να, και τα] προβατα διασκορπισθησ[ονται. ει-]
[ποντος το]υ Πετ{ρου}· Και ει παντες, ο[υκ εγω....]
[...Ι{ησου}ς· Πρι]ν αλεκτρυων δις κοκ[κυσει τρις]
[...με α]παρν[ηση.]
Translation
...l]ead out, when he s[a]i[d]: A[ll]
of you [on this] night will be scandaliz[ed]
[according to] what is written: I shall strike the [shep-]
herd and the] sheep shall be scatter[ed. When]
[said] Pet{er}: Even if all, n[ot I....]
[...J{esu}s: Befor]e a cock twice cr[ows, thrice]
[you will d]en[y me].

== Reconstruction ==
Textual comparison with the texts in the three synoptic gospels leads to the above reconstruction of missing letters:

Κατὰ Ματθαίον, 26: 30-34

Καὶ ὑμνήσαντες
ἐξῆλθον εἰς

τὸ Ὄρος τῶν Ἐλαιῶν.
Τότε λέγει αὐτοῖς
ὁ Ἰησοῦς·
Πάντες ὑμεῖς

σκανδαλισθήσεσθε
ἐν ἐμοὶ
ἐν τῇ νυκτὶ ταύτῃ,
γέγραπται γάρ·
Πατάξω τὸν ποιμένα,
καὶ διασκορπισθήσονται
τὰ πρόβατα
τῆς ποίμνης.
μετὰ δὲ τὸ ἐγερθῆναί
με προάξω ὑμᾶς
εἰς τὴν Γαλιλαίαν.
ἀποκριθεὶς δὲ
ὁ Πέτρος
εἶπεν αὐτῷ·
Εἰ πάντες
σκανδαλισθήσονται
ἐν σοί,
ἐγὼ οὐδέποτε
σκανδαλισθήσομαι.
ἔφη αὐτῷ
ὁ Ἰησοῦς·
Ἀμὴν λέγω σοι
ὅτι ἐν ταύτῃ τῇ
νυκτὶ πρὶν ἀλέκτορα φωνῆσαι
τρὶς ἀπαρνήσῃ με.

Κατά Μάρκον, 14: 26-30

Καὶ ὑμνήσαντες
ἐξῆλθον εἰς

τὸ Ὄρος τῶν Ἐλαιῶν.
Καὶ λέγει αὐτοῖς
ὁ Ἰησοῦς ὅτι·
Πάντες

σκανδαλισθήσεσθε,

ὅτι γέγραπται,
Πατάξω τὸν ποιμένα,
καὶ τὰ πρόβατα
διασκορπισθήσονται·
ἀλλὰ
μετὰ τὸ ἐγερθῆναί
με προάξω ὑμᾶς
εἰς τὴν Γαλιλαίαν.

ὁ δὲ Πέτρος
ἔφη αὐτῷ·
Εἰ καὶ πάντες
σκανδαλισθήσονται,
ἀλλ' οὐκ ἐγώ.

καὶ λέγει αὐτῷ
ὁ Ἰησοῦς·
Ἀμὴν λέγω σοι
ὅτι σὺ σήμερον ταύτῃ τῇ
νυκτὶ πρὶν ἢ δὶς ἀλέκτορα φωνῆσαι
τρίς με ἀπαρνήσῃ.

Fragment

...ε]ξαγειν

ως ε[ι]πε[ν]
οτι,
Α[παντες]

σκανδαλισ[θησεσ-][θε
[εν ταυτη] τη νυκτι

κατα] το γραφεν·
Παταξω τον [ποιμε-][να,
και τα] προβατα
διασκορπισθησ[ονται.

το]υ Πετ{ρου}·
ει-] [ποντος
Και ει παντες,

ο[υκ εγω....]

[...Ι{ησου}ς·

Πρι]ν αλεκτρυων
δις κοκ[κυσει
τρις] [...με α]παρν[ηση.]

Κατά Λουκάν, 22: 34, 39

Καὶ
ἐξελθὼν ἐπορεύθη
κατὰ τὸ ἔθος εἰς
τὸ Ὄρος τῶν Ἐλαιῶν:
ἠκολούθησαν δὲ αὐτῷ καὶ οἱ μαθηταί.

ὁ δὲ εἶπεν,
Λέγω σοι,
Πέτρε,
οὐ φωνήσει σήμερον ἀλέκτωρ ἕως
τρίς με ἀπαρνήσῃ εἰδέναι.

== Textual source ==
- Stanley E. Porter and Wendy J. Porter, New Testament Greek Papyri and Parchments. Vol. 1: Text; Vol. 2: Plates, Mitteilungen aus der Papyrussammlung der Österreichischen Nationalbibliothek (MPER) XXX (Berlin; New York: de Gruyter, 2008).

== See also ==
- List of Gospels
