= Oxyrhynchus Gospels =

4th-century Christian manuscripts

The Oxyrhynchus Gospels are two fragmentary manuscripts discovered among the rich finds of discarded papyri at Oxyrhynchus in Egypt. They throw light on early non-canonical Gospel traditions.

== Oxyrhynchus 840 ==
Oxyrhynchus 840 (P. Oxy. V 840), found in 1905, is a single small vellum parchment leaf with 45 lines of text written on both sides in a tiny neat hand that dates it to the 4th century, almost square, less than 10 cm across. It is kept at the Bodleian Library, MS. Gr. th. g. 11 (P). The text probably predates 200, but no more is determinable from this evidence. In his introduction in The Complete Gospels, Philip Sellew notes that this fragment was likely a talisman text, kept as an amulet, perhaps worn around the neck. Michael J. Kruger, who did his PhD dissertation on this fragment, concludes that this could be not an amulet but a miniature codex. The text itself has been dated to the first half of the second century. Sellew calls it "similar to the New Testament gospels in its style and tone."

The fragment begins with the end of a warning to an evildoer who plans ahead, yet fails to take the next life into account. There follows sections of a narrative unparalleled in any other known gospel tradition, about Jesus' encounter with "a Pharisee, a leading priest" who tries to order Jesus and the disciples out of the Temple as ritually unclean. Jesus responds by contrasting ritual cleanliness — gotten by bathing like a harlot in the water used by dogs and pigs — against the life-giving (metaphorical) water that comes down from heaven in baptism.

Jesus is called "Savior" (Greek: Σωτήρ), which is rare in the New Testament, but not unparalleled. The author of the fragment also believes that laymen have to change their clothes to enter the temple, for which there is no other evidence. The author is distinctly hostile to Judaism, but as he knows little about it, the text is presumably not from Judea; the author's vague grasp of details of Temple rituals have suggested a Johannine circle, perhaps in Syria.

== Oxyrhynchus 1224 ==
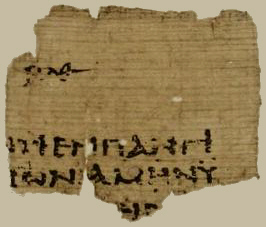
Papyrus Oxyrhynchus 1224 (recto)

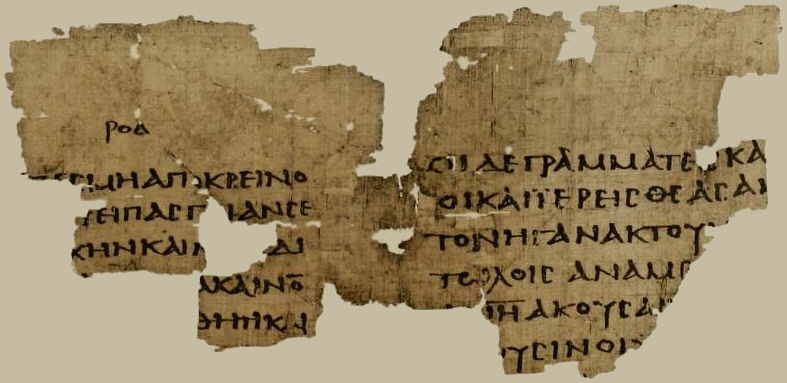
Papyrus Oxyrhynchus 1224 (verso)

Oxyrhynchus 1224 (P. Oxy. X 1224), now at the Bodleian Library, MS. Gr. th. e. 8 (P), consists of two small papyrus fragments from the late 3rd or early 4th century. It contains six passages, each about a sentence. Two of the longer ones are parallel to Mark 2:17 and Luke 9:50, but the differences in phrasing show they are textually independent of the Gospels. A precise date for composition is unknown; 50 is possible, though a date of around 150 AD is more widely accepted by scholars. John Dominic Crossan notes the mutilated condition in his introduction to the fragmentary text in The Complete Gospels resulting in highly conjectural reconstructions of the text, which, however, "does not seem to be dependent on the New Testament gospels. … As an independent gospel, it belongs, insofar as its fragmentary state allows us to see, not with discourse gospels involving the risen Jesus (e.g., the Secret Book of James and the Gospel of Mary), but with sayings gospels involving the earthly Jesus (e.g., Q document and the Gospel of Thomas)." Crossan suggests that the document might have been written as early as the mid-first century.

== See also ==
- List of Gospels
- Oxyrhynchus Papyri
- Papyrus Oxyrhynchus 1
- Papyrus Oxyrhynchus 210
- Papyrus Oxyrhynchus 5575
