= The Fifth Gospel =

Novel by Philipp Vandenberg

The Fifth Gospel (Das fünfte Evangelium), first published in Germany in 1993, is a novel by Philipp Vandenberg.

The book deals with the discovery of a Coptic parchment that contains a gospel written by the son of Jesus and Mary Magdalene. The book was made famous by Dan Brown in his novel The Da Vinci Code, which was written 10 years later.

== The Hypothesis of Jesus-Mary Magdalene ==
Donovan Joyce's novel The Jesus Scroll, first published in 1972, proposes that Jesus married Mary Magdalene and that at least one child was born of this union.

In 1982, this hypothesis was advanced again in Richard Leigh, Henry Lincoln and Michael Baigent's The Holy Blood and the Holy Grail. This book, Dan Brown writes, is one of the volumes in the library of Leigh Teabing, a character in Brown's The Da Vinci Code.

In 2012, the disclosure of the debated contents of the so-called "Gospel of Jesus' wife", written in Coptic and perhaps dating to the 2nd century, has brought to the forefront the issue of the alleged relationship between Jesus and Mary Magdalene. However, the "Gospel of Jesus' wife" has since been shown to be a modern forgery.

== See also ==
- List of Gospels
