= Books of Adam =

Collective name of several apocryphal books relating to Adam and Eve

The Books of Adam is a collective name of several apocryphal books relating to Adam and Eve.

- The Book of Adam or "Contradiction of Adam and Eve", denigrated as "a romance made up of Oriental fables" by the 1913 edition of the Catholic Encyclopedia. It was first translated from the 6th century Ethiopian version into German by August Dillmann, and into English by Solomon Caesar Malan.
- The "Pénitence d'Adam", or "Testament d'Adam", composed of some Syrian fragments translated by Ernest Renan. "The Penitence of Adam and Eve" has been published in Latin by Wilhelm Meyer.
- "The Books of the Daughters of Adam", mentioned in the catalogue of Pope Gelasius I in 495–496, who identifies it with the Book of Jubilees, or "Little Genesis".
- The "Testament of Our First Parents", cited by Anastasius the Sinaïte.
- The Book of Adam (Adamgirk) by Arakel of Siwnik (Arakel Sunetsi), a book of poetry on Adam and Eve. It was written in 1403, and first published in 1799. It was first translated to English by Michael E. Stone.

== See also ==
- Apocalypse of Adam
- Conflict of Adam and Eve with Satan
- Life of Adam and Eve
- Testament of Adam
- The scripture of the Mandaean religion, Ginza Rabba, which is also titled The Book of Adam.
