= Calvary =

Site of Jesus' crucifixion

Coordinates: 31°46′43″N 35°13′46″E

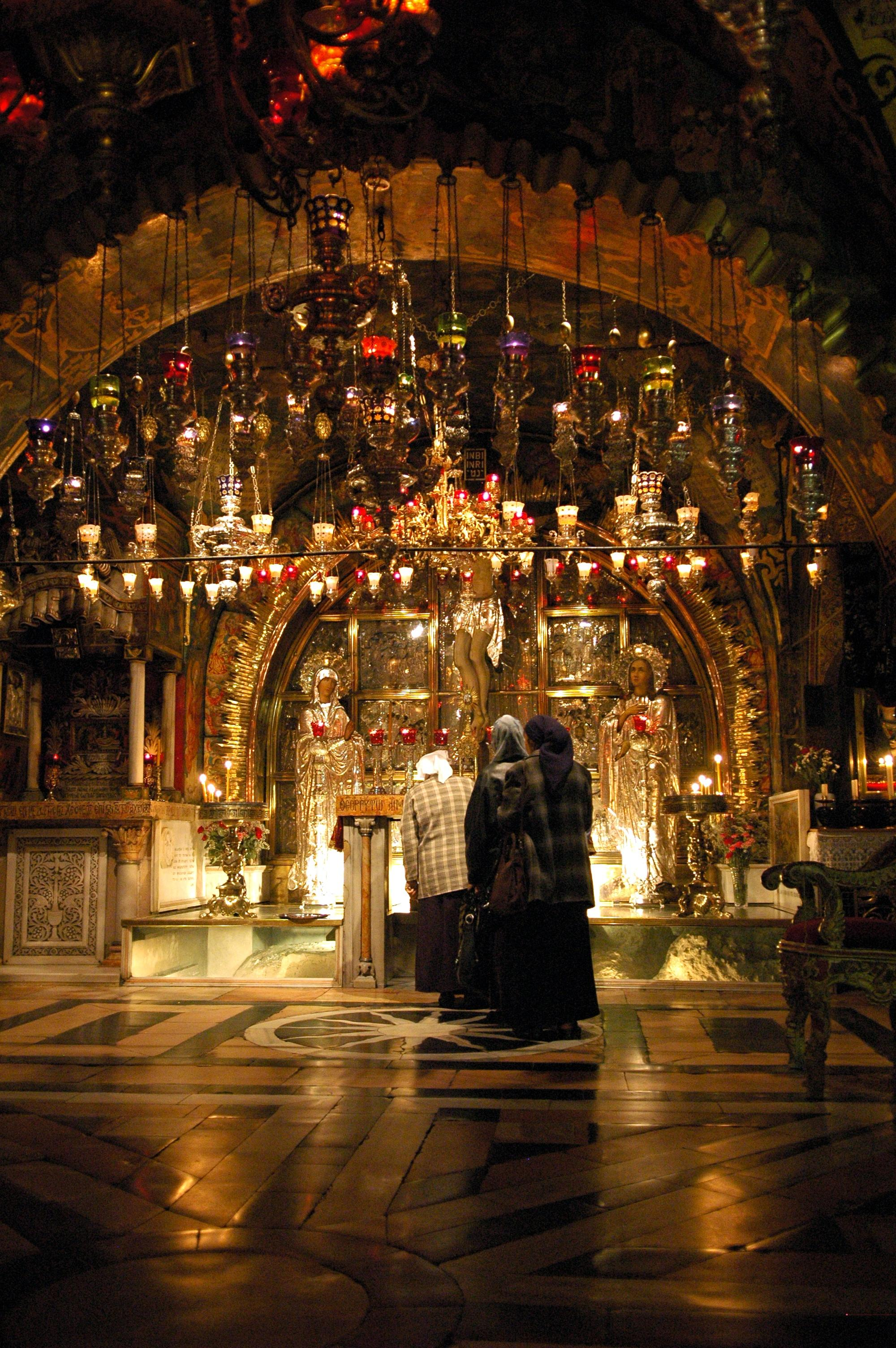
Traditional site of Golgotha in the Church of the Holy Sepulchre

Calvary (Latin: Calvariae, or Calvariae locus) or Golgotha (Biblical Greek: Γολγοθᾶ), (Note: The Gospel texts explain that this name means "the place of the Skull" (Κρανίου Τόπος) or "the Skull" (Κρανίον)) derived from Golgolta (Jewish Palestinian Aramaic: גולגולתא), was a site immediately outside Roman Jerusalem's walls where, according to Christianity's four canonical gospels, Jesus was crucified.

Since at least the early medieval period, it has been a destination for pilgrimage. The exact location of Calvary has traditionally been associated with a place now enclosed within one of the southern chapels of the multidenominational Church of the Holy Sepulchre, a site traditionally believed to have been identified by the Roman empress Helena, mother of Constantine the Great, during her visit to the Holy Land in 325. Other locations have been suggested: in the 19th century, Protestant scholars proposed a different location near the Garden Tomb on Green Hill (now "Skull Hill") about 500 m (1,600 ft) north of the traditional site.

== Biblical references and names ==
Altar at the traditional site of Golgotha

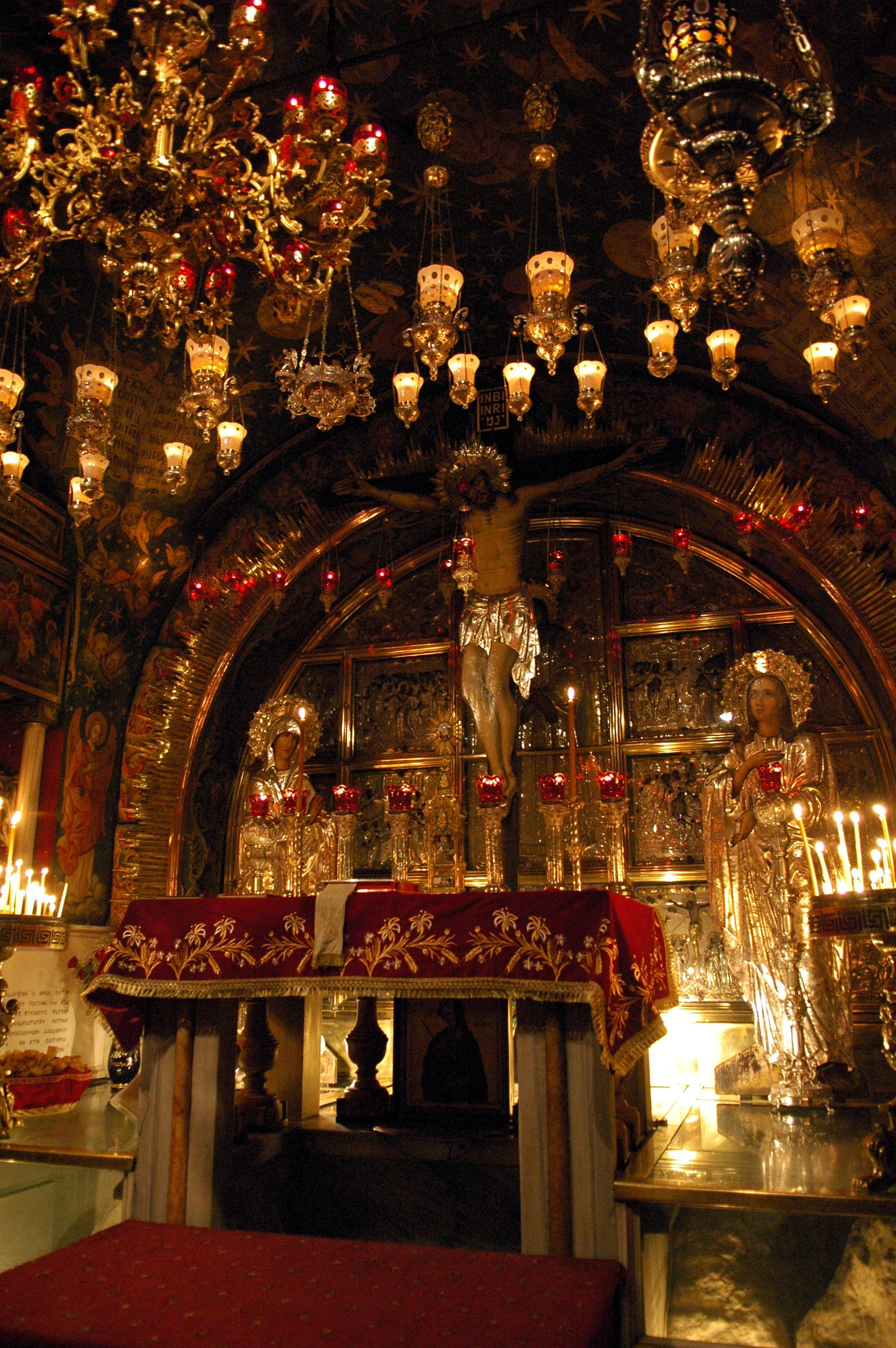
The altar at the traditional site of Golgotha

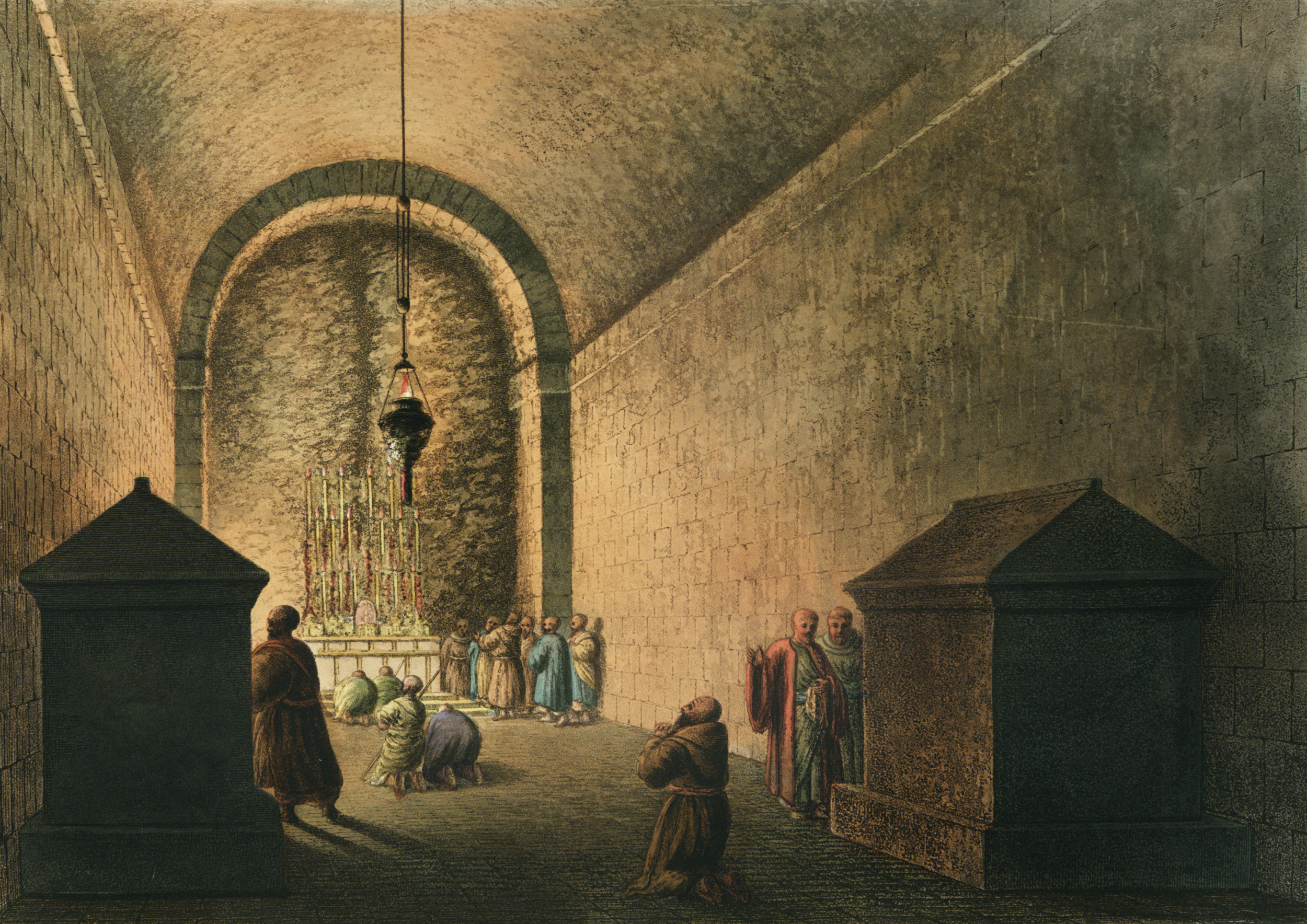
Chapel of Mount Calvary, painted by Luigi Mayer

The English names Calvary and Golgotha derive from the Vulgate Latin Calvariae, Calvariae locus and locum (all meaning "place of the Skull" or "a Skull"), and Golgotha used by Jerome in his translations of Matthew 27:33, Mark 15:22, Luke 23:33, and John 19:17. Versions of these names have been used in English since at least the 10th century, a tradition shared with most European languages including French (Calvaire), Welsh (Calfaria), Spanish and Italian (Calvario), pre-Lutheran German (Calvarie), Polish (Kalwaria), Croatian (Kalvarija), and Lithuanian (Kalvarijos). The 1611 King James Version borrowed the Latin forms directly, while Wycliffe and other translators anglicized them in forms like Caluarie, Caluerie, and Calueri which were later standardized as Calvary. While the Gospels merely identify Golgotha as a "place", Christian tradition has described the location as a hill or mountain since at least the 6th century. It has thus often been referred to as Mount Calvary in English hymns and literature.

In the 1769 King James Version, the relevant verses of the New Testament are:

- And when they were come unto a place called Golgotha, that is to say, a place of a skull, They gave him vinegar to drink mingled with gall: and when he had tasted thereof, he would not drink. And they crucified him, and parted his garments, casting lots.
- And they bring him unto the place Golgotha, which is, being interpreted, the place of a skull. And they gave him to drink wine mingled with myrrh: but he received it not. And when they had crucified him, they parted his garments, casting lots upon them, what every man should take.
- And when they were come to the place, which is called Calvary, there they crucified him, and the malefactors, one on the right hand, and the other on the left.
- And he bearing his cross went forth into a place called the place of a skull, which is called in the Hebrew Golgotha: Where they crucified him, and two other with him, on either side one, and Jesus in the midst.

In the standard Koine Greek texts of the New Testament, the relevant terms appear as Golgothâ (Γολγοθᾶ), Golgathân (Γολγοθᾶν), kraníou tópos (κρανίου τόπος), Kraníou tópos (Κρανίου τόπος), Kraníon (Κρανίον), and Kraníou tópon (Κρανίου τόπον). Golgotha's Hebrew equivalent would be Gulgōleṯ (גֻּלְגֹּלֶת, "skull"), ultimately from the verb galal (גלל) meaning "to roll". The form preserved in the Greek text, however, is actually closer to Aramaic Golgolta, which also appears in reference to a head count in the Samaritan version of Numbers 1:18, although the term is traditionally considered to derive from Syriac Gāgūlṯā (ܓܓܘܠܬܐ) instead. Although Latin calvaria can mean either "a skull" or "the skull" depending on context and numerous English translations render the relevant passages "place of the skull" or "Place of the Skull", the Greek forms of the name grammatically refer to the place of a skull and a place named Skull. (The Greek word κρᾱνῐ́ον does more specifically mean the cranium, the upper part of the skull, but it has been used metonymously since antiquity to refer to skulls and heads more generally.)

The Fathers of the Church offered various interpretations of the name and its origin. Jerome considered it a place of execution by beheading (locum decollatorum), Pseudo-Tertullian describes it as a place resembling a head, and Origen associated it with legends concerning the skull of Adam. This buried skull of Adam appears in noncanonical medieval legends, including the Book of the Rolls, the Conflict of Adam and Eve with Satan, the Cave of Treasures, and the works of Eutychius, the 9th-century patriarch of Alexandria. The usual form of the legend is that Shem and Melchizedek retrieved the body of Adam from the resting place of Noah's ark on Mount Ararat and were led by angels to Golgotha, a skull-shaped hill at the center of the earth where Adam had previously crushed the serpent's head following the Fall of Man.

In the 19th century, Wilhelm Ludwig Krafft proposed an alternative derivation of these names, suggesting that the place had actually been known as "Gol Goatha"—which he interpreted to mean "heap of death" or "hill of execution"—and had become associated with the similar sounding Semitic words for "skull" in folk etymologies. James Fergusson identified this "Goatha" with the Goʿah (גֹּעָה) mentioned in Jeremiah 31:39 as a place near Jerusalem, although Krafft himself identified that location with the separate Gennáth (Γεννάθ) of Josephus, the "Garden Gate" west of the Temple Mount.

== Location ==
There is no consensus as to the location of the site. John 19:20 describes the crucifixion site as being "near the city". According to Hebrews 13:12, it was "outside the city gate". Matthew 27:39 and Mark 15:29 both note that the location would have been accessible to "passers-by". Thus, locating the crucifixion site involves identifying a site that, in the city of Jerusalem some four decades before its destruction in AD 70, would have been outside a major gate near enough to the city that the passers-by could not only see him, but also read the inscription 'Jesus of Nazareth, King of the Jews'.

=== Church of the Holy Sepulchre ===
Christian tradition since the fourth century has favoured a location now within the Church of the Holy Sepulchre. This places it well within today's walls of Jerusalem, which surround the Old City and were rebuilt in the 16th century by the Ottoman Empire. Proponents of the traditional Holy Sepulchre location point to the fact that first-century Jerusalem had a different shape and size from the 16th-century city, leaving the church's site outside the pre-AD 70 city walls.

Defenders of the traditional site have argued that the site of the Church of the Holy Sepulchre was only brought within the city limits by Herod Agrippa (41–44), who built the so-called Third Wall around a newly settled northern district, while at the time of Jesus' crucifixion around AD 30 it would still have been just outside the city.

Henry Chadwick (2003) argued that, when Hadrian's builders replanned the old city, they "incidentally confirm[ed] the bringing of Golgotha inside a new town wall."

In 2007, Dan Bahat, the former City Archaeologist of Jerusalem and Professor of Land of Israel Studies at Bar-Ilan University, stated that "Six graves from the first century were found on the area of the Church of the Holy Sepulchre. That means, this place [was] outside of the city, without any doubt...".

== Church of the Holy Sepulchre ==
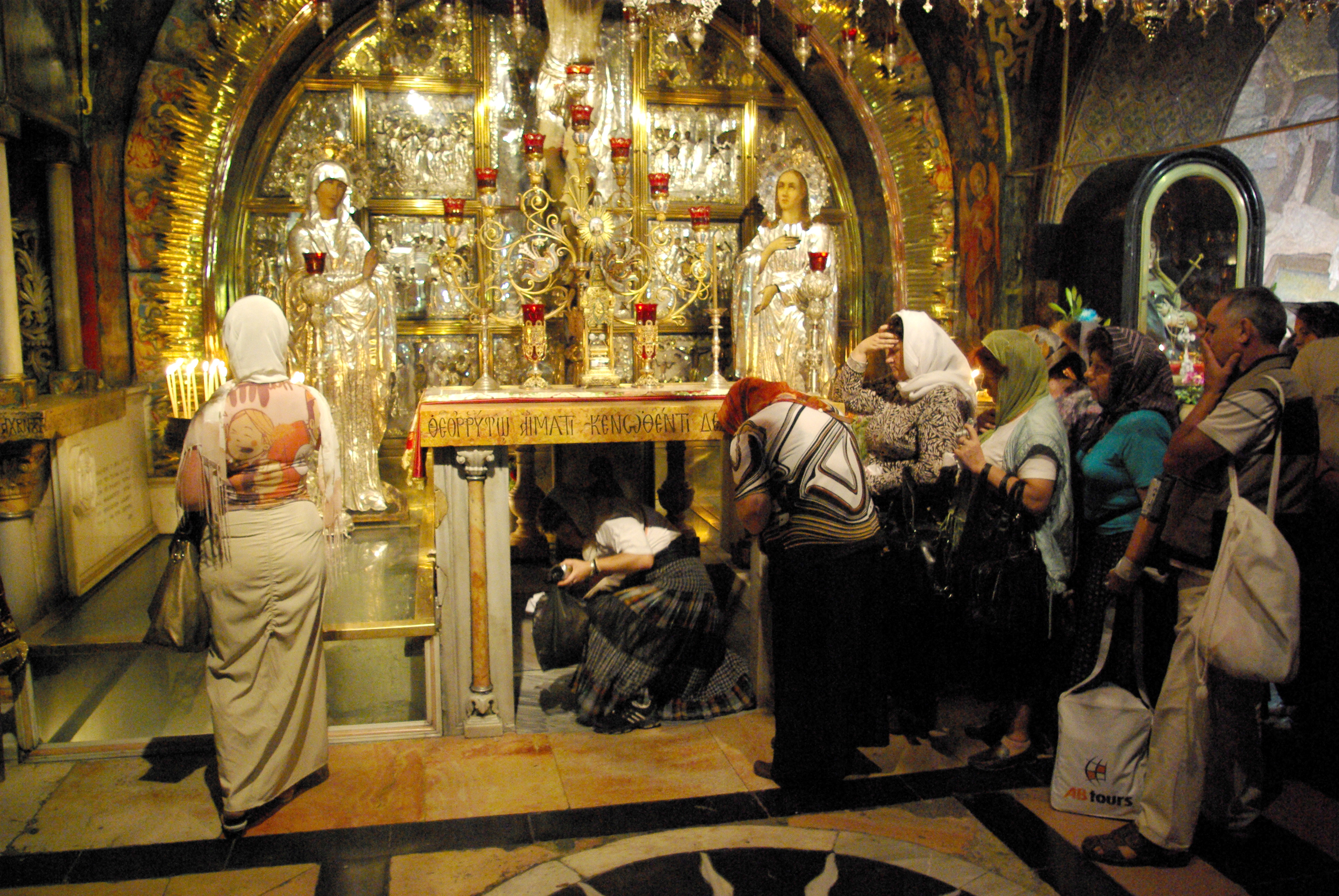
Pilgrims queue to touch the rock of Calvary in Chapel of the Crucifixion.

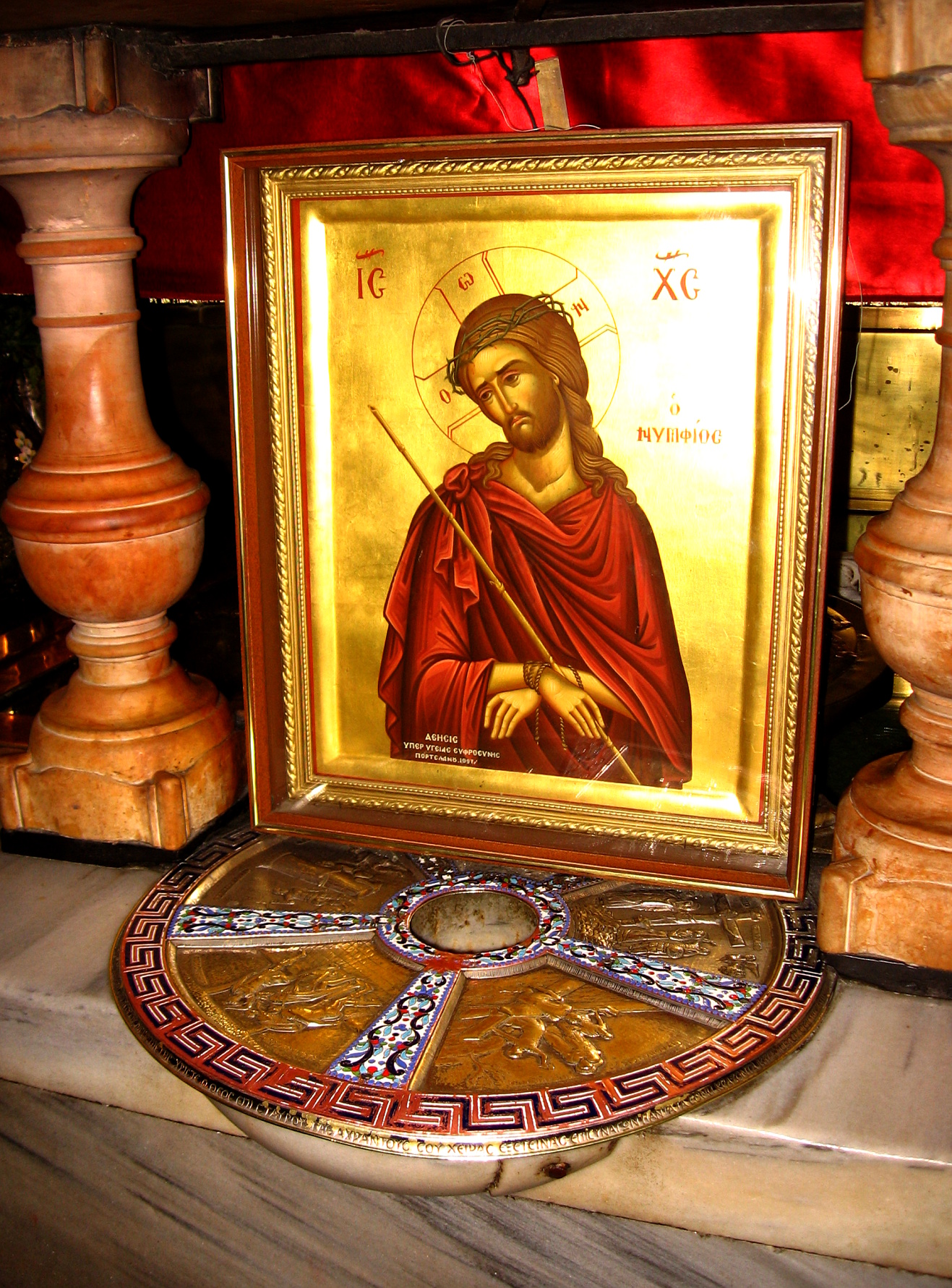
Disc marking traditional place, under the altar, where Jesus' cross stood

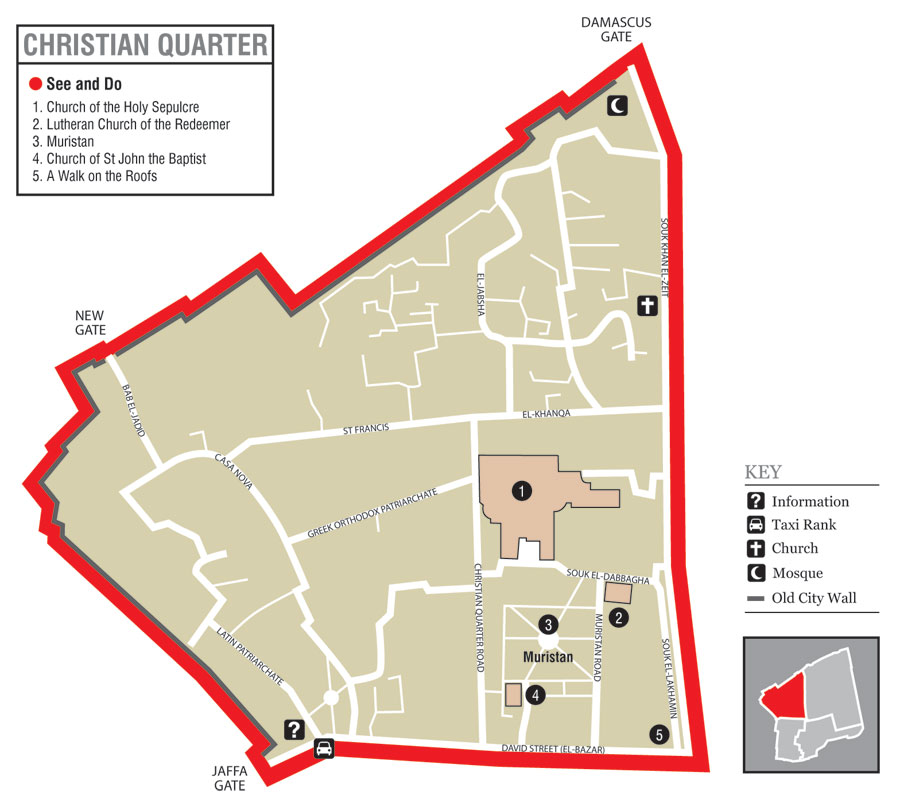
The Holy Sepulchre (1) in the Christian Quarter of Jerusalem

The traditional location of Golgotha derives from its identification by Queen Mother Helena, mother of Constantine the Great, in 325. Less than 45 meters (150 ft) away, Helena also identified the location of the tomb of Jesus and claimed to have discovered the True Cross; her son, Constantine, then built the Church of the Holy Sepulchre around the whole site. In 333, the author of the Itinerarium Burdigalense, entering from the east, described the result:

On the left hand is the little hill of Golgotha where the Lord was crucified. About a stone's throw thence is a vault [crypta] wherein his body was laid, and rose again on the third day. There, at present, by the command of the Emperor Constantine, has been built a basilica; that is to say, a church of wondrous beauty.

Various archeologists have proposed alternative sites within the Church as locations of the crucifixion. Nazénie Garibian de Vartavan argued that the now-buried Constantinian basilica's altar was built over the site.

=== Temple to Aphrodite ===
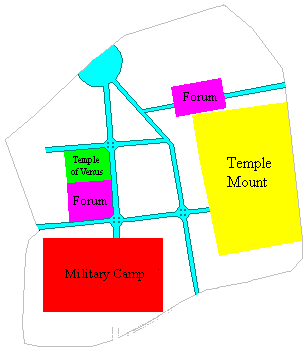
Jerusalem after being rebuilt by Hadrian: Two main east–west roads were built, as well as two main north–south roads.

Prior to Helena's identification, the site had been a temple to Aphrodite. Constantine's construction took over most of the site of the earlier temple enclosure, and the Rotunda and cloister (which was replaced after the 12th century by the present Catholicon and Calvary chapel) roughly overlap with the temple building itself; the basilica church Constantine built over the remainder of the enclosure was destroyed at the turn of the 11th century, and has not been replaced. Christian tradition claims that the location had originally been a Christian place of veneration, but that Hadrian had deliberately buried these Christian sites and built his own temple on top, on account of his alleged hatred for Christianity.

There is certainly evidence that c. 160, at least as early as 30 years after Hadrian's temple had been built, Christians associated it with the site of Golgotha; Melito of Sardis, an influential mid-2nd century bishop in the region, described the location as "in the middle of the street, in the middle of the city", which matches the position of Hadrian's temple within the mid-2nd century city.

The Romans typically built a city according to a Hippodamian grid plan – a north–south arterial road, the Cardo (which is now the Suq Khan-ez-Zeit), and an east–west arterial road, the Decumanus Maximus (which is now the Via Dolorosa). The forum would traditionally be located on the intersection of the two roads, with the main temples adjacent. However, due to the obstruction posed by the Temple Mount, as well as the Tenth Legion encampment on the Western Hill, Hadrian's city had two Cardo, two Decumanus Maximus, two forums, and several temples. The Western Forum (now the Muristan) is located on the crossroads of the West Cardo and what is now El-Bazar/David Street, with the Temple of Aphrodite adjacent, on the intersection of the Western Cardo and the Via Dolorosa. The Northern Forum is located north of the Temple Mount, on the junction of the Via Dolorosa and the Eastern Cardo (the Tyropoeon), adjacent to the Temple of Jupiter Capitolinus, intentionally built atop the Temple Mount.

Another popular holy site that Hadrian converted to a pagan temple was the Pool of Bethesda, possibly referenced to in the fifth chapter of the Gospel of John, on which was built the Temple of Asclepius and Serapis. While the positioning of the Temple of Aphrodite may be, in light of the common Colonia layout, entirely unintentional, Hadrian is known to have concurrently built pagan temples on top of other holy sites in Jerusalem as part of an overall "Romanization" policy.

Archaeological excavations under the Church of the Holy Sepulchre have revealed Christian pilgrims' graffiti, dating from the period that the Temple of Aphrodite was still present, of a ship, a common early Christian symbol and the etching "DOMINVS IVIMVS", meaning "Lord, we went", lending possible support to the statement by Melito of Sardis' asserting that early Christians identified Golgotha as being in the middle of Hadrian's city, rather than outside.

=== Rockface ===
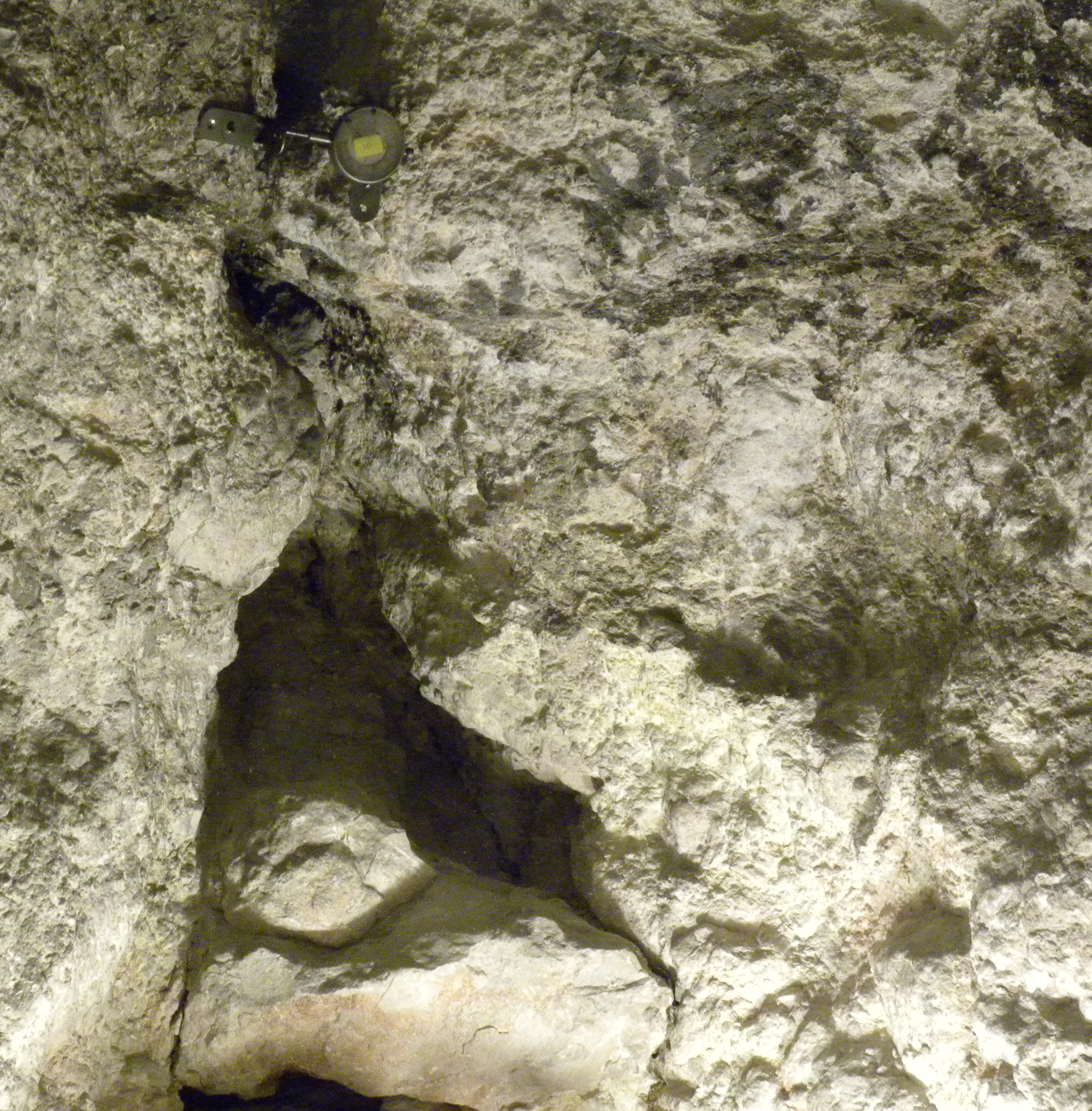
Natural stone of Golgotha in the Chapel of Adam below site

During 1973–1978 restoration works and excavations inside the Church of the Holy Sepulchre and under the nearby Muristan, it was found that the area was originally a quarry, from which white Meleke limestone was struck; surviving parts of the quarry to the north-east of the chapel of St. Helena are now accessible from within the chapel (by permission). Inside the church is a rock, about 7 m long by 3 m wide by 4.8 m high, that is traditionally believed to be all that now remains visible of Golgotha; the design of the church means that the Calvary Chapel contains the upper foot or so of the rock, while the remainder is in the chapel beneath it (known as the tomb of Adam). Virgilio Corbo, a Franciscan priest and archaeologist, present at the excavations, suggested that from the city the little hill (which still exists) could have looked like a skull.

During a 1986 repair to the floor of the Calvary Chapel by the art historian George Lavas and architect Theo Mitropoulos, a round slot of 11.5 cm (4.5 in) diameter was discovered in the rock, partly open on one side (Lavas attributes the open side to accidental damage during his repairs); although the dating of the slot is uncertain, and could date to Hadrian's temple of Aphrodite, Lavas suggested that it could have been the site of the crucifixion, as it would be strong enough to hold in place a wooden trunk of up to 2.5 metres (8 ft 2 in) in height (among other things). The same restoration work also revealed a crack running across the surface of the rock, which continues down to the Chapel of Adam; the crack is thought by archaeologists to have been a result of the quarry workmen encountering a flaw in the rock.

Based on the late 20th century excavations of the site, there have been a number of attempted reconstructions of the profile of the cliff face. These often attempt to show the site as it would have appeared to Constantine. However, as the ground level in Roman times was about 4–5 feet (1.2–1.5 m) lower and the site housed Hadrian's temple to Aphrodite, much of the surrounding rocky slope must have been removed long before Constantine built the church on the site. The height of the Golgotha rock itself would have caused it to jut through the platform level of the Aphrodite temple, where it would be clearly visible. The reason for Hadrian not cutting the rock down is uncertain, but Virgilio Corbo suggested that a statue, probably of Aphrodite, was placed on it, a suggestion also made by Jerome. Some archaeologists have suggested that prior to Hadrian's use, the rock outcrop had been a nefesh – a Jewish funeral monument, equivalent to the stele.

=== Pilgrimages to Constantine's Church ===
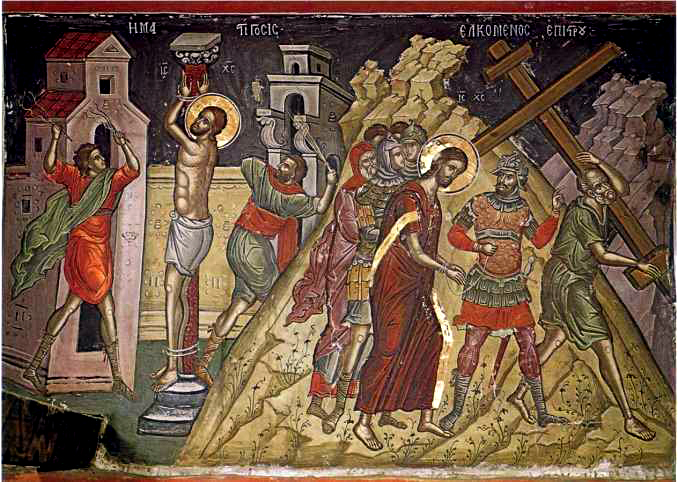
Icon of Jesus being led to Golgotha, 16th century, Theophanes the Cretan (Stavronikita Monastery, Mount Athos)

The Itinerarium Burdigalense speaks of Golgotha in 333: "... On the left hand is the little hill of Golgotha where the Lord was crucified. About a stone's throw from thence is a vault (crypta) wherein His body was laid, and rose again on the third day. There, at present, by the command of the Emperor Constantine, has been built a basilica, that is to say, a church of wondrous beauty", Cyril of Jerusalem, a distinguished theologian of the early Church, and eyewitness to the early days of Constantine's edifice, speaks of Golgotha in eight separate passages, sometimes as near to the church where he and his listeners assembled: "Golgotha, the holy hill standing above us here, bears witness to our sight: the Holy Sepulchre bears witness, and the stone which lies there to this day." And just in such a way the pilgrim Egeria often reported in 383: "... the church, built by Constantine, which is situated in Golgotha..." and also bishop Eucherius of Lyon wrote to the island presbyter Faustus in 440: "Golgotha is in the middle between the Anastasis and the Martyrium, the place of the Lord's passion, in which still appears that rock which once endured the very cross on which the Lord was." Breviarius de Hierosolyma reports in 530: "From there (the middle of the basilica), you enter into Golgotha, where there is a large court. Here the Lord was crucified. All around that hill, there are silver screens." (See also: Eusebius in 338.)

== Gordon's Calvary ==
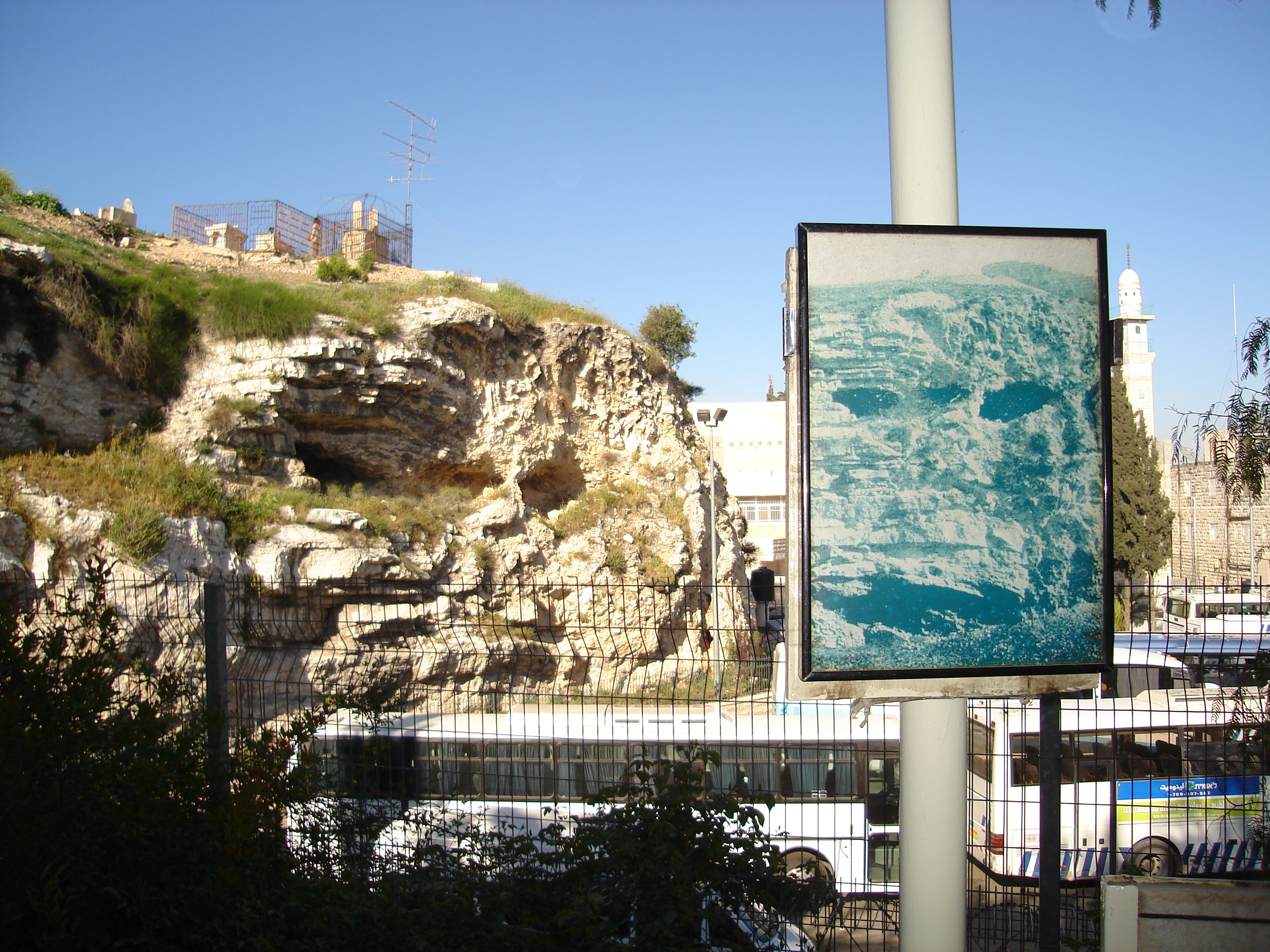
Rocky escarpment resembling a skull, located northwest of the Church of the Holy Sepulchre, near the Garden Tomb with c. 1900s picture posted on pole for comparison

In 1842, Otto Thenius, a theologian and biblical scholar from Dresden, Germany, was the first to publish a proposal that the rocky knoll north of Damascus Gate was the biblical Golgotha. He relied heavily on the research of Edward Robinson. In 1882–83, Major-General Charles George Gordon endorsed this view; subsequently, the site has sometimes been known as Gordon's Calvary. The location, usually referred to today as Skull Hill, is beneath a cliff that contains two large sunken holes, which Gordon regarded as resembling the eyes of a skull. He and a few others before him believed that the skull-like appearance would have caused the location to be known as Golgotha.

Nearby is an ancient rock-cut tomb known today as the Garden Tomb, which Gordon proposed as the tomb of Jesus. The Garden Tomb contains several ancient burial places, although the archaeologist Gabriel Barkay has proposed that the tomb dates to the 7th century BC and that the site may have been abandoned by the 1st century.

Eusebius comments that Golgotha was in his day (the 4th century) pointed out north of Mount Zion. While Mount Zion was used previously in reference to the Temple Mount itself, Josephus, the first-century AD historian who knew the city as it was before the Roman destruction of Jerusalem, identified Mount Zion as being the Western Hill (the current Mount Zion), which is south of both the Garden Tomb and the Holy Sepulchre. Eusebius' comment therefore offers no additional argument for either location.

== See also ==
- Crucifixion of Jesus
- Kalvary Mount
