= Testament of Adam =

2nd–5th century Christian work

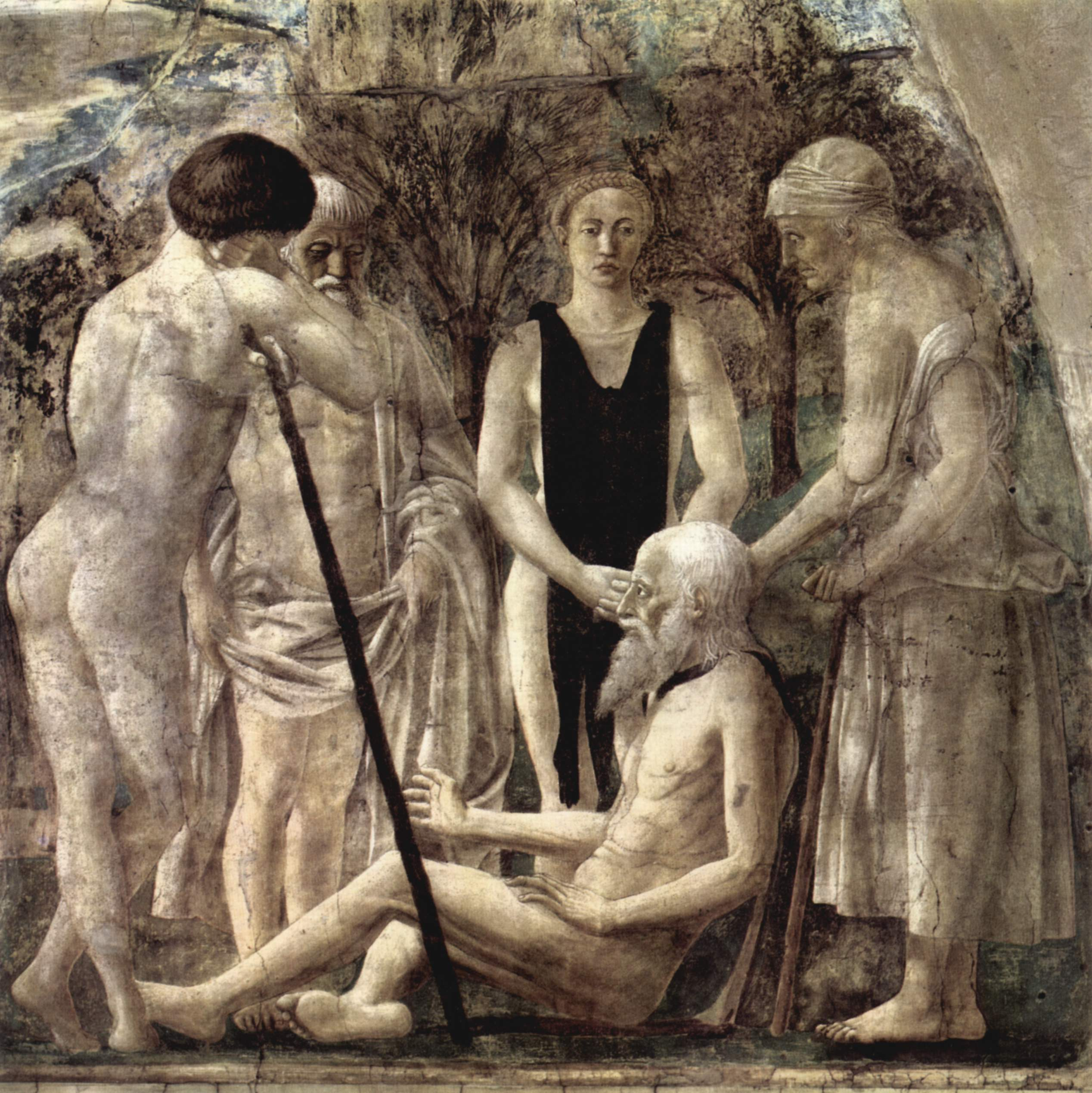
Painting by Piero della Francesca depicting the death of Adam

The Testament of Adam is a Christian work of Old Testament pseudepigrapha that dates from the 2nd to 5th centuries AD in origin, perhaps composed within the Christian communities of Syria. It purports to relate the final words of Adam to his son Seth; Seth records the Testament and then buries the account in the legendary Cave of Treasures. Adam speaks of prayer and which parts of Creation praise God each hour of the day; he then prophesies both the coming of the Messiah and the Great Flood; and finally, a description of the celestial hierarchy of angels is given.

The work was likely originally written in Syriac. Manuscripts are extant in Syriac, Arabic, Karshuni, Ethiopic, Armenian, Georgian, and Greek. The earliest surviving manuscript is dated to the 9th century, and there appear to be three major recensions of the text.

== Authorship and date ==
The author of the work is unknown. The date of composition was likely somewhere between the 2nd century to the 5th century; S. E. Robinson hypothesizes that the mid-to-late third century as the best guess. They probably were a Syrian or Palestinian Christian, as certain wordplay and puns seem unique to Syriac in the oldest versions, along with a quote of Zechariah 1:8 that matches the Syriac Peshitta version rather than the Greek Septuagint version. There appears to be a quotation of the work in the Syriac version of the Transitus Mariae, generally thought to date to the late 4th century. The third section of the work, the celestial hierarchy, does not appear closely linked to the rest of the work; it is thus possible it was composed independently before being combined with the work at some point in the 5th–7th centuries.

The author was likely compiling and modifying an existing piece of Jewish apocrypha. What was originally a Jewish midrash on the story of Creation was expanded to include a defense of Christianity's claim that Jesus was the promised Jewish Messiah. This suggests a community that was admiring of Judaism, as contrasted to other branches of Christianity which strongly rejected Judaism in the era of the late Roman Empire; for this author, Jesus was a continuation of a grand Jewish tradition.

== Content ==
The text is pseudepigraphically attributed to Adam's son Seth, who wrote the Testament then sealed it in the Cave of Treasures. The first section, called the Horarium by S. E. Robinson, consists of describing which creatures praise God at each hour, and how they do so. It is notably a unitary view of God's dominion over creation rather than a dualist one: all, from demons to the fire to grass to humans to angels, serve God.

In the second section, called the Prophecy by Robinson, Adam reveals hidden information to Seth. He tells of the creation and fall of man, speaks of the coming Great Flood, prophecies of the Passion of Jesus Christ, and the final end of the world. God also promises to make Adam a god, but "not right now"; the delay is due to Adam's sin in eating the forbidden fruit, identified here as a fig. God says he will deify Adam after God's (Jesus's) resurrection, and Adam will sit at the right hand of God.

The third section, called the Hierarchy by Robinson, includes a detailed angelology that describes all nine orders of angels and their functions. In order from lowest to highest, angels act as guardian angels, with one for each human. Archangels care for non-humans such as animals and birds. Archons control the weather. Authorities govern the sources of light in the sky above: the Sun, the Moon, and the stars. Powers stop demons from destroying the world in their jealousy of humanity. Dominions rule over political kingdoms and control victory and defeat in battle. The text describes one as riding a red horse and killing thousands under the Assyrian king, along with a reference to the 2 Maccabees version of the Battle of Beth Zur where an angel armed with a golden weapon helped send the Seleucid army to flight. Thrones guard the gate of the holy of holies and stand before the throne of God. Cherubim carry the throne of the Lord and are keepers of the divine seals. Seraphim serve in the inner chamber.

== Similar works ==
The first section of the story is similar to Psalm 148, another account of how all creation praises God. Similar apocryphal works include the Gnostic Apocalypse of Adam, the Conflict of Adam and Eve with Satan, and the Life of Adam and Eve. The work (along with the Syriac version of Cave of Treasures) seems to have influenced the Arabic Apocalypse of Peter, another pseudepigraphical text popular in Syrian Christianity dated to the 9th–10th centuries. (Note: An Arabic version with English translation of the Book of the Rolls which contains a modified and expanded excerpt from the Testament of Adam can be found in: Gibson, Margaret Dunlop (1901). Thomas, David (ed.). Apocrypha Arabica. Studia Sinaitica, No. VIII. London: C. J. Clay and Sons. pp. 13–17.) The angelology of the third section may have influenced the Book of the Bee, a 13th-century Syriac work.
