= Conflict of Adam and Eve with Satan =

Christian extracanonical work

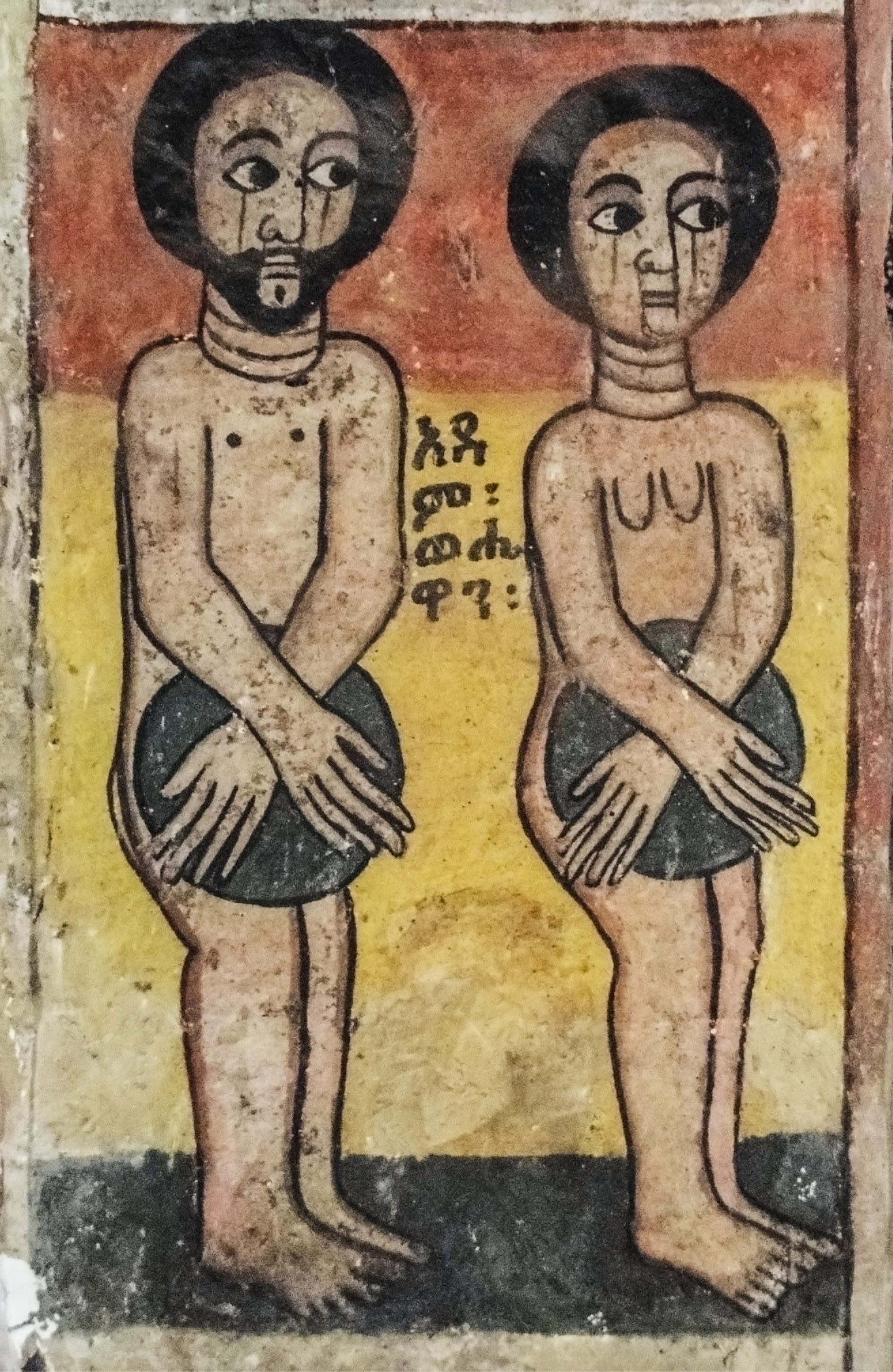
Ethiopian painting of Adam and Eve, Church of Abreha wa-Atsbeha

The Conflict of Adam and Eve with Satan (also known as The Book of Adam and Eve) is a 6th-century Christian extracanonical work found in Ge'ez, translated from an Old Arabic original which is translated from a Syriac source, namely Cave of Treasures.

== Editions and translations ==
It was first translated from the Ge'ez Ethiopic version into German by August Dillmann. It was first translated into English by S. C. Malan from the German of Ernest Trumpp. The first half of Malan's translation is included as the "First Book of Adam and Eve" and the "Second Book of Adam and Eve" in The Lost Books of the Bible and the Forgotten Books of Eden. The books mentioned below were added by Malan to his English translation; the Ethiopic is divided into sections of varying length, each dealing with a different subject.

== Content ==
Books 1 and 2 begin immediately after the expulsion from the Garden of Eden, and end with the testament and translation of Enoch. Great emphasis is placed in Book 1 on Adam's sorrow and helplessness in the world outside the garden.

In Book 1, the punished Serpent attempts to kill Adam and Eve, but is prevented by God, who again punishes the Serpent by rendering it mute and casting it to India. Satan also attempts to deceive and kill Adam and Eve several times. In one of his attempts on their life, he throws a boulder which ends up encompassing Adam and Eve. God eventually saves them and compares this event with the upcoming Resurrection of Christ. God also predicts several other future Biblical events, including Noah and the flood.

In Book 2, the "sons of God" who appear in Genesis 6:2 are identified as the children of Seth, and the "daughters of men" as women descended from Cain, who successfully tempt most of the Sethites to come down from their mountain and join the Cainites in the valley below, under the instigation of Genun, son of Lamech. This Genun invents musical instruments, generally attributed to Jubal; however he also invents weapons of war, generally attributed to Tubal-Cain. The Cainites, descended from Cain the first murderer, are described as exceedingly wicked, being prone to commit murder and incest. After seducing the Sethites, their offspring become the Nephilim, the "mighty men" of Gen. 6 who are all destroyed in the deluge, as also detailed in other works such as 1 Enoch and Jubilees.

Books 3 and 4 continue with the lives of Noah, Shem, Melchizedek, etc. through to the destruction of Jerusalem by Titus in AD 70. The genealogy from Adam to Jesus is given, as in the Gospels, but including also the names of the wives of each of Jesus' ancestors, which is extremely rare.

== Textual origin ==
The Cave of Treasures is a Syriac work containing many of the same legends; indeed, as Malan remarks, a whole body of stories expanding upon the Old Testament is found in the Talmud, in the Quran, and in other late antique texts.

== Differences from Genesis ==
- 1st Adam and Eve LXXVIII:16 "Then on the morrow Adam said unto Abel his son, 'Take of thy sheep, young and good, and offer them up unto thy God; and I will speak to thy brother, to make unto his God an offering of corn.'" By contrast, Genesis 4:2–3 says: "And in process of time it came to pass, that Cain brought of the fruit of the ground an offering unto the LORD. And Abel, he also brought of the firstlings of his flock and of the fat thereof. And the LORD had respect unto Abel and to his offering".
- Book 2 has discrepancies with Old Testament saint lifetimes:
  - Enos lived 985 years (2nd Adam and Eve XIV:4) whereas Genesis says that he lived 905 years (Genesis 5:11).
  - Mahalaleel lived 870 years (2nd Adam and Eve XVI:2) whereas Genesis says that he lived 895 years (Genesis 5:17).
  - Jared lived 989 years (2nd Adam and Eve XXI:13) whereas Genesis says that he lived 962 years (Genesis 5:20).

== See also ==
- Apocalypse of Adam
- Books of Adam
- Life of Adam and Eve
- Testament of Adam
