= Life of Adam and Eve =

Jewish apocryphal writings (1st–5th centuries)

The Life of Adam and Eve, also known in its Greek version as the Apocalypse of Moses (Ancient Greek: Ἀποκάλυψις Μωϋσέως, romanized: Apokalypsis Mōuseōs; Biblical Hebrew: ספר אדם וחוה), is a Jewish apocryphal group of writings. It recounts the lives of Adam and Eve from after their expulsion from the Garden of Eden to their deaths. It provides more detail than does the Book of Genesis about the Fall of Man, including Eve's version of the story. Satan explains that he rebelled when God commanded him to bow down to Adam. After Adam dies, he and all his descendants are promised a resurrection.

The ancient versions of the Life of Adam and Eve are: the Greek Apocalypse of Moses, the Latin Life of Adam and Eve, the Slavonic Life of Adam and Eve, the Armenian Penitence of Adam, the Georgian Book of Adam, and one or two fragmentary Coptic versions. These texts are usually named as Primary Adam Literature to distinguish them from subsequent related texts, such as the Cave of Treasures, that include what appears to be extracts, the Testament of Adam, and the Apocalypse of Adam.

They differ greatly in length and wording, but for the most part appear to be derived from a single source that has not survived. Each version contains some unique material as well as variations and omissions.

While the surviving versions were composed from the early 3rd to the 5th century AD, the literary units in the work are considered to be older and predominantly of Jewish origin. Some scholars think the original was composed in a Semitic language in the 1st century AD while other scholars think it is a "thoroughly Christian composition in Greek".

== Themes ==
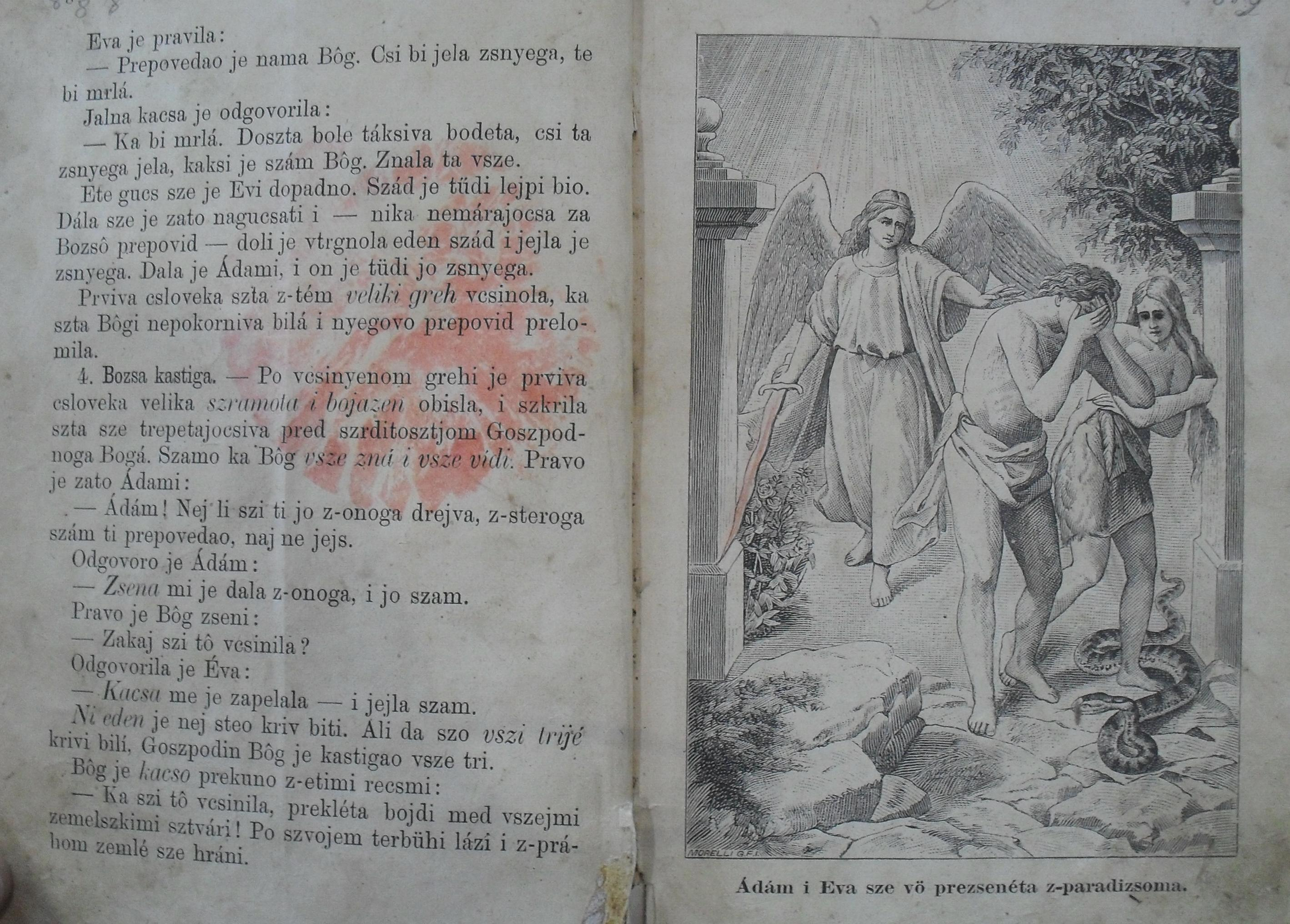
"The Expulsion of Adam and Eve from Eden" picture from Mála biblia z-kejpami (Small Bible with pictures) by Péter Kollár (1897).

The main theological issue in the texts is that of the consequences of the Fall of Man, of which sickness and death are mentioned. Other themes include the exaltation of Adam in the Garden, the fall of Satan, the anointing with the oil of the Tree of Life, and a combination of majesty and anthropomorphism in the figure of God, involving numerous merkabahs and other details that show a relationship with 2 Enoch. The idea of resurrection of the dead is present and Adam is told God's son Christ will come at that time to anoint all who believe in him with the Oil of Mercy, a fact that has led many scholars to think part of the text is of Christian origin. The Life of Adam and Eve is also important in the study of the early Seth traditions.

Parallels can be found with some New Testament passages, such as the mention of the Tree of Life in Revelation 22:2. The more striking resemblances are with ideas in the Second Epistle to the Corinthians: Eve as the source of sin (2 Corinthians 11:3), Satan disguising himself as an angel of light (2 Corinthians 11:14), the location of the paradise in the third heaven (2 Corinthians 12:2). In addition, there are parallels between Jesus' forty days in the desert and Adam and Eve's forty days in the rivers. No direct relationship can be determined between the New Testament and the Life of Adam and Eve, but the similarities suggest that Paul the Apostle and the author of 2 Enoch were near contemporaries of the original author of this work and moved in the same circle of ideas. The theme of death is also central to the text. While Adam is dying, Seth asks what it means to be ill, as he has no concept of it. Adam must explain to his children what dying and death means, and what to do with his body when he dies.

== Versions ==
=== Greek Apocalypse of Moses ===
The Apocalypse of Moses (literally, the Revelation of Moses) is the usual name for the Greek version of the Life of Adam and Eve. This title was given to it by Tischendorf, its first editor, and taken up by others. In the text, Moses is referred to only in the first sentence as the prophet to whom the story was revealed. The Greek Apocalypse of Moses (not to be confused with the Assumption of Moses) is usually considered to predate the Latin Life of Adam and Eve.

Tischendorf used four manuscripts for his edition: manuscripts A, B, C, and D. During the 20th century many other manuscripts have been found, of which E1 and E2, which are similar to the Armenian version, merit special mention. A1, B, C, D, E1, and E2 were the basis of the English translation of Welsh and the German of Fuchs.

In the Jewish Quarterly Review, it proposes that this book influenced the development of Christianity:

It is almost certain that in this Apocalypse we have one of those Jewish apocryphs which, like the Book of Enoch, exercised a formative influence upon the earliest Christianity. For two ideas are prominent in it which have been perpetuated in the younger religion, namely, that of baptism by trine immersion after repentance and forgiveness of sins, and that of the resurrection in the flesh and restoration to the Garden of Eden of the descendants of Adam. The former of these two ideas is conveyed in ch. xxxvii., the latter in chs. xxviii., xxxvii., xxxix. and xliii.

— Fred. C. Conybeare, Jewish Quarterly Review, ON THE APOCALYPSE OF MOSES

==== Synopsis ====
After being banished from the Garden of Eden, Adam and Eve go to the East and live there for 18 years and two months. Eve gives birth to Cain and Abel. Eve dreams that Cain drinks the blood of Abel, but that it then came out of his mouth. Cain kills Abel. Michael promises to Adam a new son, and Seth is born "in place of Abel". (chapters 1–4)

Adam begets 30 other sons and 30 daughters. As Adam falls sick and is in pain, all his sons and daughters come to him, and he briefly recounts to them the story of the Fall. Seth and Eve travel to the doors of the Garden to beg for some oil of the tree of mercy (i.e. the Tree of Life). On the way Seth is attacked and bitten by a wild beast, which goes away when ordered by Seth. Michael refuses to give them the oil at that time, but promises to give it at the end of time, when all flesh will be raised up, the delights of paradise will be given to the holy people and God will be in their midst. On their return, Adam says to Eve: "What hast thou done? Thou hast brought upon us great wrath which is death." (chapters 5–14)

Eve recounts to her sons and daughters the story of the Fall from her point of view: in the Garden, she is separated from Adam. Eve stays with the female animals and Adam with the male ones. The devil persuades the male snake to rebel against Adam and his wife: at the hour the angels go up to worship the Lord, Satan disguises himself as an angel and speaks to Eve using the mouth of the serpent. The serpent seduces Eve, who swears to give the fruit to eat to Adam too. The serpent places in the fruit the poison of his wickedness, which is lust. When Eve eats it, she discovers that she is naked. All the trees of the Garden lose their leaves. Only a fig tree, the plant she ate of, still has leaves, and she hides her shame with its leaves. Eve looks for Adam and deceives him: he also eats the forbidden fruit. (chapters 15–21)

Michael sounds a trumpet, and God enters the Garden mounted on the chariot of his Cherubim and preceded by the angels. His throne is set where the Tree of Life is, and all the trees break out in blossoms. He calls Adam, who hid because he was naked, and reproaches Adam, Eve and the serpent (the order of the reproaches is the opposite to that of Genesis). When the angels are casting Adam out of paradise, he asks to be allowed to implore God, saying: "For I alone have sinned." He begs God to be allowed to eat of the Tree of Life. God refuses to give him the fruit of immortality, but promises, if Adam will keep from all evil, to raise him up in the last day and give him the fruit. Before being cast out, Adam is allowed to take sweet spices (to offer sacrifices) and seeds for his food. (chapters 22–30)

Adam lies sick and foretells that Eve will die shortly after. He asks Eve to pray, because they do not know whether God is angry with them or merciful. While Eve is praying on bended knee, the "angel of humanity" (probably Michael) comes and shows her the spirit of Adam gone from his body and ascending to God. (chapters 31–32)

Chapters 33–41 narrate, with great richness of liturgical detail, the funeral of Adam. A chariot of light, borne by four bright eagles with Seraphim and angels, arrives where Adam's body lies. The seven heavens are opened and Seth explains to his mother who are the two fearful figures in mourning: the sun and the moon, deprived of their light, because God is present. God has mercy on Adam, who is cleansed three times in water before being carried before God. God stretches out his arm, and hands Adam over to Michael to be carried to the third heaven until the last day. (chapters 33–37) The chariot and all the angels bear Adam's body to the Garden and lay him on the earth. Only Seth can see the scene. The body is covered with linen clothes and fragrant oil is poured on it. The body of Abel also, which until then the earth had refused to receive, is taken to the same place. Both bodies are buried in the place from which God took the clay to create Adam. God calls Adam, whose body answers from the earth. God promises Adam that he and everyone of his seed will rise again. (chapters 38–41)

Six days later, Eve asks to be buried near Adam and dies praying to the Lord. Three angels bury Eve near Adam, and Michael tells Seth never to mourn on the Sabbath. (chapters 42–43)

=== Latin Life of Adam and Eve ===
The main edition of the Latin version (in Latin Vita Adami et Evae or Vita Adae et Evae) is that of W. Meyer in 1878 based on manuscripts S, T, M of the 9th, 10th, and 12th centuries. Later, a new and extended edition was prepared by Mozley based mainly on manuscripts kept in England, of which the most important is manuscript A.

==== Synopsis ====
The story begins immediately after Adam and Eve's banishment from the Garden of Eden and continues to their deaths. After being banished from the Garden of Eden, they go to the West and after six days they become hungry, but the only food they find is that for animals. They decide to do penance in order to ask mercy to the Lord and to return in the Garden. Adam explains to Eve how to do penance: he will stay forty-seven days immersed in the Jordan and Eve forty days in the icy Tigris. Adam enters in the Jordan and prays the Lord together with all the creatures of the river. (chapters 1–8)

Satan disguises himself as a bright angel and talks her out of it. Eve returns to Adam, who reproaches her. Eve lies prostrate with grief. Adam complains about Satan persecuting them, and Satan explains that he and his followers refused God's command to worship both Adam, the image of the God, and God himself. Thus Satan with his angels were expelled from heaven, deprived of their glory and began to envy men. Adam, unaffected by the story, serves forty days of penance in the Jordan. (chapters 9–17) Eve is so grief-stricken that she leaves Adam and goes alone toward the West, lamenting and crying. When it is the time for her to give birth, she is alone. Adam reaches her and prays to the Lord: because of his prayer many angels arrive to help her in the delivery: Cain is born and immediately is able to run. They return east. Michael is sent by the Lord to teach Adam agriculture. (chapters 18–22)

Abel is born. Eve dreams that Cain drinks the blood of Abel. Adam and Eve make Cain a husbandman and Abel a shepherd in order to separate them from each other. However, Cain murders Abel (there is no trace of the common story found elsewhere that Cain and Abel had twin sisters, and Cain's killing of Abel is passed over quickly). Seth is born "in place of Abel", along with 30 other sons and 30 (or 32) daughters. (chapters 23–24). Cain and his twin sister Luluwa are born and Abel and his twin sister Aklia are born. "As for Adam, he knew not again his wife Eve, all the days of his life; neither was any more offspring born of them; but only those five, Cain, Luluwa, Abel, Aklia," and Seth alone. Josephus in endnotes 8) "The number of Adam's children, as says the old tradition was thirty-three(33) sons, and twenty-three(23) daughters."

Adam recounts to Seth that, after the Fall, he was caught up into the Paradise of righteousness and saw a chariot with the Lord seated on it among angels (a merkabah). Adam worshipped the Lord, who promised him that knowledge will not be taken away from Adam's seed for ever. Adam continues to recount briefly to Seth the history of the world up to last judgment (the Second Temple period is marked as a time of iniquity but the destruction of the Temple is not recounted). (chapters 25–29)

As Adam is dying, sick and in pain, he wants to bless all his sons and daughters, who do not know what illness and pain are. Adam recounts to them the story of the Fall. Seth and Eve travel to the gates of the Garden to beg for some oil of the Tree of Life. On the way Seth is attacked and bitten by the Serpent, which goes away when ordered by Seth. At the gates of the Garden, Michael refuses to give them the oil. On their return, Adam says to Eve: "What hast thou done? A great plague hast thou brought upon us, transgression and sin for all our generations." (chapters 30–44)

Adam dies at the age of 930 and the sun, the moon and the stars are darkened for seven days. Adam's soul is consigned to Michael till the day of Judgment, when his sorrow will be converted into joy. God and some angels bury his body and Abel's. (chapters 45–49)

Eve perceives that she will die and assembles all her sons and daughters for her testament, predicting a double judgment of water (probably the deluge) and fire. Seth is charged to write on two tablets the life of his parents. (chapters 49–50) Six days later, Eve dies, and Michael tells Seth never to mourn on the Sabbath. (chapters 51)

Chapters 52–57 include various additional traditions: the tablets written by Seth about the lives of his parents are put in the place where Adam used to pray, that is Temple Mount. Only Salomon could read them. The entry of Adam into the Garden only forty days after his creation (eighty for Eve). The explanation of the eight parts of Adam's body and the origin of the name 'Adam'.

Only the plot of chapters 23–24, 30–49, 51 is in common with that of the Apocalypse of Moses, though with great differences in details. Chapters 15–30 (Eve's Tale) of the Apocalypse of Moses have no parallel in the Latin Life of Adam and Eve. The penance of Adam and Eve in the water can be found also in the later Conflict of Adam and Eve with Satan.

=== Slavonic Life of Adam and Eve ===
The Slavonic Adam book was published by Jagic along with a Latin translation in 1893. This version agrees for the most part with the Greek Apocalypse of Moses. It has, moreover, a section, §§ 28–39, which, though not found in the Greek text, is found in the Latin Life of Adam and Eve. It includes also some unique material.

=== Armenian Penitence of Adam ===
This Armenian version of the Life of Adam and Eve was first published in 1981 by Stone and is based on three manuscripts. It was probably translated into Armenian from Greek and takes its place alongside the Greek and Latin versions as a major witness to the Adam book. A different book is the Armenian Book of Adam, which closely follows the text of the Apocalypse of Moses.

The content of the Armenian Penitence of Adam includes both the penances in the rivers (not found in the Greek version) and Eve's recounting of the Fall (not found in the Latin version).

=== Georgian Book of Adam ===
The Georgian Book of Adam is known from five manuscripts in two recensions. The earliest is a 15th- or 16th-century of the first recension. The others are three 17th-century copies of the first recension a sole 17th-century representative of the second recension. The Georgian and Armenian versions share a common Vorlage.

=== Coptic fragments ===
There are two fragments of a Coptic translation of the Greek Adam, one in the Sahidic dialect and another in Fayyumic. In 1975, O. H. E. Burmester reported a possible fragment of a Copto-Arabic version of the Life of Adam and Eve in the Hamburg University Library, but it has since gone missing.

== Modern editions ==
The Adam and Eve Archive is an ongoing project by Gary A. Anderson and Michael E. Stone to present all of the original texts in both the original languages and in translation. It contains English translations of the most important texts and a synopsis guide that allows the viewer to easily jump from a section in one source to parallel sections in other sources. Brian O. Murdoch produced a comparative study on the development of the western European medieval vernacular translations of the Vita Adae et Evae including glosses of quotations from the original texts.

== See also ==
- Apocalypse of Adam
- Book of the Penitence of Adam
- Conflict of Adam and Eve with Satan
- Testament of Adam
- Paradise Lost

== Bibliography ==
- Brian O. Murdoch, The Apocryphal Adam and Eve in Medieval Europe: Vernacular Translations and Adaptations of the Vita Adae et Evae, Oxford (OUP), 2009. ISBN 978-0-19-956414-9.
- Marinus de Jonge, Johannes Tromp The Life of Adam and Eve and Related Literature ISBN 1-85075-764-X (1997)
- Gary A. Anderson, Michael E. Stone, Johannes Tromp Literature on Adam and Eve: Collected Essays ISBN 90-04-11600-1 (2000)
- H.F.D. Sparks The Apocryphal Old Testament ISBN 0-19-826177-2 (1984)
- M.D. Johnson Life of Adam and Eve, a new translation and introduction in ed. J.H. Charlesworth the Old Testament Pseudepigrapha Vol 2 ISBN 0-385-18813-7 (1985)
- L. Rosso Ubigli in ed. P.Sacchi Apocrifi dell'Antico Testamento 2 ISBN 978-88-02-07606-5 (1989)
- English Translations by L.S.A. Wells from The Apocrypha and Pseudepigrapha of the Old Testament in English, Volume II Pseudepigrapha edited by R. H. Charles, Clarendon Press, 1913.
- Stone, Michael E. "The fall of Satan and Adam's penance: three notes on the 'Books of Adam and Eve.'." The Journal of Theological Studies 44, no. 1 (1993): 143+. Religion and Philosophy Collection (accessed 15 December 2017). http://link.galegroup.com.ezproxy.tntech.edu/apps/doc/A13749296/PPRP?u=tel_a_ttul&sid=PPRP&xid=1042769b.

=== Further reading ===
- de Jonge, Marinus (1997). Life of Adam and Eve and Related Literature. Guides to Apocrypha and Pseudepigrapha. Sheffield: Sheffield Academic Press. ISBN 9781850757641.
