= Arabic Apocalypse of Peter =

10th-century Christian apocalyptic text

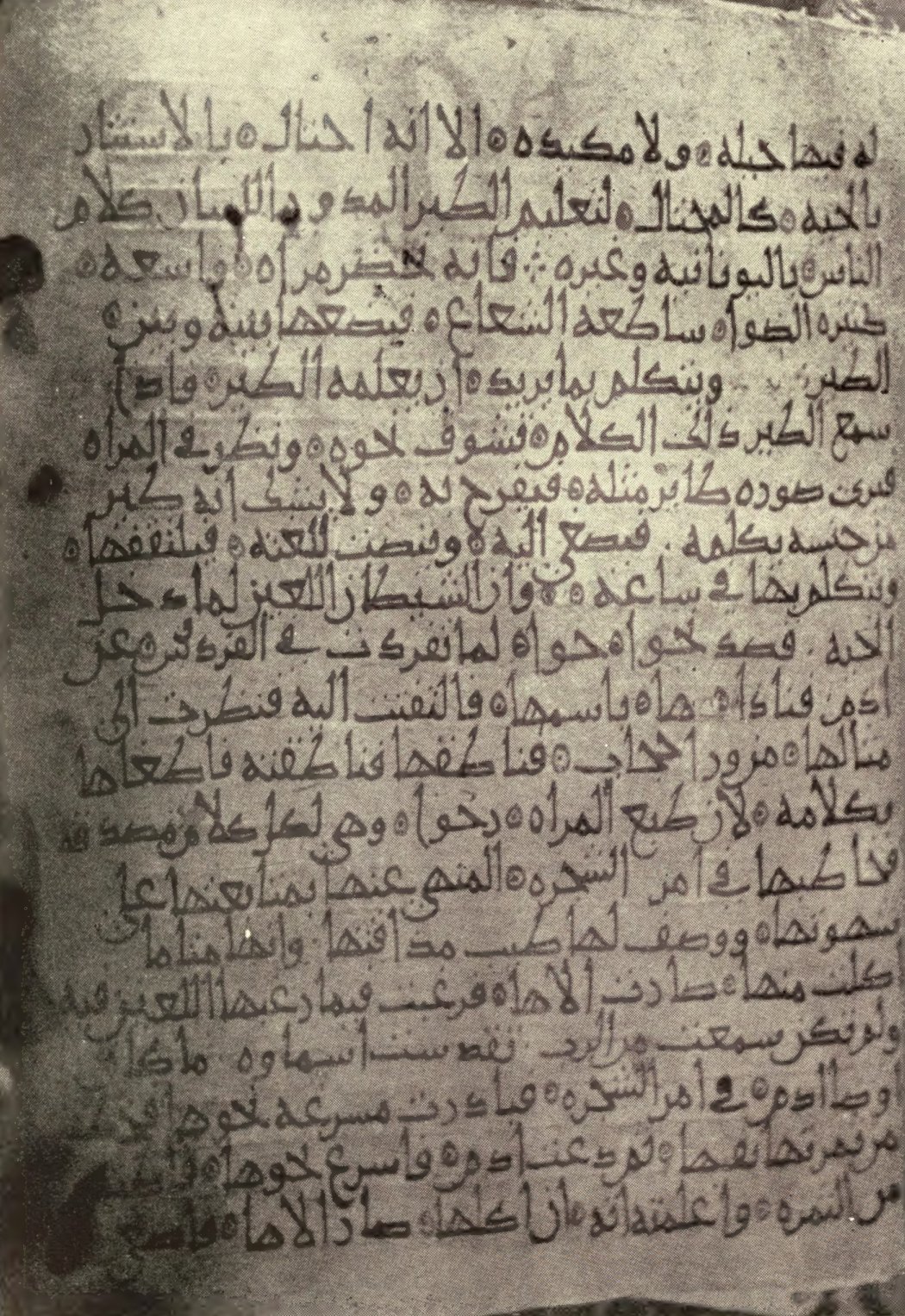
A page of a manuscript of the Arabic Apocalypse of Peter

The Apocalypse of Peter or Vision of Peter (Arabic: Ru'ya Buṭrus), also known as the Book of the Rolls (Arabic: Kitāb al-Magāll) and other titles, (Note: Attested titles in Arabic include "Apocalypse of Peter" (Ru'ya Buṭrus or Jalayān Buṭrus), "Apocalypse of Simon" (Iktishāf Shimʿūn), "Book of the Secrets" (Kitāb al-asrār), "Book of the Hidden Secrets" (Kitāb al-sarāʾir al-maktūma), "Book of Benefits" (Kitāb al-fawāʾid), and "Book of Perfection" (Kitāb al-kamāl).) is an Arab Christian work probably written in the 10th century; the late 9th century and 11th century are also considered plausible. Around 40 manuscripts of it have been preserved and found. It is pseudepigraphically attributed to Clement of Rome, relating a vision experienced by the Apostle Peter of the resurrected Jesus; the actual author is unknown. The work was originally written in Arabic; many Ethiopic manuscripts exist as well, with the reworked Ethiopic version in the work Clement (Ethiopic: Qalēmenṭos or Kalamentos) along with other stories of Clementine literature.

While the framing story is similar to Clementine literature, the work bears little in common with most Clementine work, and is instead closer to Jewish and Christian apocalyptic literature. Interpretations of Bible stories are given by Peter, and versions of other stories popular in Syriac literature are told, including the Cave of Treasures and the Testament of Adam. The work goes into detail on Christian angelology and offers various pronouncements on issues of doctrine and practice, such as strictly forbidding honoring the Jewish Sabbath or partaking in cultural practices associated with Islam. The last section features prophecies of future rulers and kingdoms and loosely describes 2nd–10th-century history, while also giving reassurance that the non-Christian governments foreseen by Peter will only rule for a limited period, and will eventually fall.

== Contents and theology ==
=== Overview ===
The text is an apocalypse revealing secrets of the future, purportedly delivered by Jesus to the apostle Peter, who then transmitted them to Clement of Rome. The Miaphysite community of Christians (concentrated in Syria, Palestine, and Egypt) had suffered persecution for centuries; first from Chalcedonian Christianity, the official branch of Christianity in the Eastern Roman Empire (also known as the Byzantine Empire), and later from the early Islamic caliphates that conquered the region in the 7th century. While the Apocalypse of Peter is a collection of disparate sections that cover several topics, one prominent subject is an attempt to resolve the contradiction for why the all-powerful God has seemingly allowed governments opposed to (Miaphysite) Christianity to rule. The work encourages readers to persevere in the Christian faith and that God still rules the world; the successive rule by hostile governments and other disasters were a chastisement for the sins of the Christians, this future was all foreseen by Peter, and everything is still part of God's plan. With the community under the threat of conversions to Islam and defections, it encourages Christian readers that God will ultimately vindicate them.

The work appears to be written in three sections; it is possible that the author incorporated stories written during different, earlier historical periods and combined them. The first part introduces and frames the work, and includes an extensive retelling of the Cave of Treasures. The second part is a narration of the secrets of heaven and the coming end times. The third part is a political apocalypse, discussing prophecies of the non-Miaphysite governments and why God has allowed them to rule. The work includes several variations and expansions on biblical stories. Margaret Dunlop Gibson translated the first section based on a manuscript from the Sinai Peninsula and gave it the title "Kitāb al-Magāll or the Book of the Rolls; one of the Books of Clement", while the second and third sections were originally translated into English by Alphonse Mingana who preferred the title Arabic Apocalypse of Peter; as a result, sometimes the sections are referred to by the names they were originally translated under by convention.

=== Narrative ===
In the first section, a framing story is established. Clement is contending with hostile Jews, and asks Peter for insight to prove that the Christian interpretation of the Torah and other Jewish scriptures is correct. There is an expansion of the story of the creation of the world detailing exactly what happened on the six days as well as details on the nature of the angels. It expands the story of the fall of Adam and Eve, saying it came due to Satanael's envy of Adam's role as king and chief priest. It clarifies that the curse levied in Genesis was actually only levied on Eve for being seduced by Satanael, not Adam. It also includes an expansion of the 7th-century Syriac story Cave of Treasures, which was popular among Syrian Christians, as well as the Testament of Adam. Celebrating the Sabbath on Saturday, as the Jews do, is strictly forbidden for Christians. It defends the doctrine of the virginity of Mary and goes into detail on Mary's genealogy.

In the second section, Clement says he knows enough to refute the Jews, but wishes to know the heavenly secrets that the resurrected Jesus had revealed to Peter at the Mount of Olives. Peter agrees to tell Clement, and clarifies that this knowledge was not even shared with Moses. It is part of a genre of post-resurrection revelation of secrets not found in the Bible popular in the region. The work expounds on various theological points. In a medieval version of the problem of evil, it addresses why God created the Devil, Adam, Judas, and so on if God knew they would rebel. The text stresses that God is all-powerful; God allowed these rebellions as part of his plan, to set an example for others who would revolt against God. Adam's fall is related to his mortal nature's choice (that is, an early version of the "free will" explanation for evil), in some contradiction to the first section which held Adam as blameless; his immortal nature, his soul, can still find redemption even if his mortal body dies, however. The structure of the Garden of Eden, Paradise, and the Kingdom of Heaven is described, with each being greater than the previous. Peter takes some brief tours of hell, with punishments described in physical terms, and worse punishments for worse sins such as blasphemy and those who compel others to worship them. The work also stresses the unified nature of God and Jesus, in line with Miaphysite theology, and possibly as a defense against Islamic claims that the Christian Trinity was too close to polytheism. The section concludes with apocalyptic visions about signs of the end times, influenced by the Apocalypse of John (the Book of Revelation) and the book of 4 Ezra.

The third section is largely a "political apocalypse" featuring prophecies of the Arab rulers, although they are actually historical records (that is, vaticinium ex eventu). The rulers of the Abbasid Caliphate and the Umayyad Caliphate are detailed by their initials and a few of their deeds, although the references become sometimes incorrect and distorted after a time, possibly suggesting that an old "prophecy" that was current to its time of writing was partially updated later. These prophecies also help date the work to the late 9th or early 10th century based on when the prophecies turn toward an unknown future. The prophecies do not explicitly describe a fall of the caliphate after a tremendous battle or divine act, but do allude to a number of signs that indicate when the Kingdom of God will be established. While the time of deliverance is left open, the author paints a number of scenarios that suggest that the caliphate's rule is not permanent and is already crumbling, calling attention to internal strife and succession squabbles as proof that their rulers lacked divine support for their sovereignty.

=== On Islam ===
Earlier 7th- and 8th-century Miaphysite works had largely downplayed Islam as a religious threat; the caliphate was portrayed simply as barbarians and tools of God in testing Christianity, under the assumption that their reign would be short. Written after centuries had passed under Muslim rule, the Apocalypse of Peter was one of the later Arab Christian works to treat Islam somewhat more seriously, as a religious threat deserving an apologetical response. It still inherited some of its stances from these earlier works, even when they no longer matched the situation "on the ground."

Muslims and Islam are not directly referenced by name, but seem to be discussed in coded terms, perhaps as a measure of verisimilitude as the historical Clement would not have known about Islam. The work condemns Islam as a false religion that Christians must separate themselves from. An example passage showing that the troubles of the Arab Christian community had been foreseen by God:

And my Lord said: 'O Peter, how numerous will be the troubles that will befall my followers at the hand of my enemies, the children of the tares, who are inhabitants of the South and the followers of the Apostle of the Archon! Indeed they will suffer innumerable torments from them, but blessed are those who will endure hardships for my sake...

The reference to the people of the South (ahl al-tayman) seems to be to the Arabs from the Arabian Peninsula, and the "Apostle of the Archon" to Muhammad; the work referred to Satanael elsewhere as the "Archon", and is a reversal of one of Muhammad's titles in Islam as "Apostle of God". The work also condemns those who are "commanding evil and forbidding good", a seeming inversion of the Quranic injunction to "command good and forbid evil." The work warns that only those who disbelieve the "treatise of the son of the wolf" will be admitted to heaven, possibly a roundabout reference to the Quran. Perhaps most pointedly, the work seemingly compares the Antichrist to Muhammad; it writes that the Antichrist will pretend to "command good and forbid evil" and that Muslims will be among the first to follow him. Other polemical labels applied to a figure that is presumably Muhammad include "destroyer of himself and his followers, disciple of the Son of Perdition, womanizer, liar, briber."

The work also warns against cultural practices associated with Islam, such as taking names not associated with Christianity or intermarrying with Muslims. It saves one of its strongest condemnations for Christian women who use henna to dye their hands. It says that the henna tree is specially cursed by God, and that it would be better off if women who use henna were not even born; their horrible fate will be that of the Jews who crucified Jesus. (The author is incorrect in seeing this as an Islamic practice, though; dyeing hands with henna dates back to the Bronze Age in the region, long before both Christianity and Islam.)

== Authorship and date of composition ==
The text was originally written in Arabic; it is one of the earliest Christian religious works to be originally written in Arabic, rather than translated to Arabic from another language. It was popular in both Syria and Egypt, and it is not entirely clear from which it originated; surviving Egyptian manuscripts are frequently older, but these Egyptian works integrated two Syriac stories and include a number of seeming Syriac loanwords and Syrian idioms. Against the theory of a Syrian origin, some scholars suggest Coptic Egyptian origins due to references to certain church customs that seem to fit better with the Coptic Church.

While sections of the work are clearly adapted from earlier manuscripts such as the Cave of Treasures, the date of the final composition of the complete Apocalypse of Peter is tentative and unclear. August Dillmann estimated the work might date to the 8th century in 1858; later scholarship has pushed estimates of the date back to the late 9th, 10th, or 11th centuries. The work probably grew over time, with revisions and additions across different eras in the final manuscripts.

== Related works ==
The work is part of the genre of apocalyptic literature. Like many other apocalypses, the work is pseudepigrapha, attributing the authority of its revelatory dialogue to Clement and Peter. Similar Coptic and Arabic apocalypses include the Apocalypse of Pseudo-Athanasius and the Apocalypse of Samuel of Qalamun, which may have influenced the work to a degree. The book quotes Matthew 24 (the "Little Apocalypse") and the Book of Revelation particularly often for its favored biblical references. The genre of a dialogue revealing new teachings, usually with a resurrected Jesus, is sometimes called a "dialogue gospel" or erotapokriseis. While the premise of Peter revealing secrets told to him by Jesus is the same as the 2nd-century Greek Apocalypse of Peter that once achieved near-canonical status in the early Christian Church, the Arabic Apocalypse of Peter shares little overlap with the work. Some scholars do hold out a suggestion that there might yet be closer ties with the Ethiopic Apocalypse of Peter discovered once the manuscripts are collated and tracked better; for example, Paolo La Spisa sees the threatened punishments in Hell to those who convert to Islam as similar to the punishment for blasphemers and deniers of justice in the Ethiopic text.

While the framing story is similar to pseudo-Clementine literature, the Arabic Apocalypse is not actually that close to most Clementine work. There is a section toward the end that covers Peter and Clement's adventures in Rome, perhaps adapted from a Syriac biography of Clement.

A later work that seems to quote the Arabic Apocalypse of Peter is the Jāvidān-nāma-yi kabīr written by Fazlallah Astarabadi, the founder of Hurufism, a sect of Sufism. One of the chapters takes the form of a dialogue between a Christian and a Sufi Muslim, and cites the Arabic Apocalypse of Peter and its related works (such as the Cave of Treasures) numerous times, albeit in the service of arguing that the true and final form of Christianity is in Islam.

== The Apocalypse and the Fifth Crusade ==
In the present year (1219) the Syrians who were with us in the army showed us a very ancient book from their library-chest written in the Saracen language. Its inscription (title) reads: "The Revelations of the Blessed Apostle Peter, published in one volume by his disciple Clement." Whoever was the author of this book, he prophesied openly and plainly on the condition of the Church of God from the beginning up to the time of the Antichrist and the end of the world.

— Jacques de Vitry

As part of the Fifth Crusade, European crusaders attacked the Egyptian port city of Damietta, then part of the Ayyubid Sultanate. The Siege of Damietta lasted from 1218–1219, and the city was occupied until 1221. Three of the crusaders involved sent back letters and writings describing a work that was presumably the Arabic Apocalypse of Peter: a work in Arabic attributed to Clement, already ancient, that contained prophecies of Islam's eventual downfall. Jacques de Vitry, the bishop of Acre, wrote to Pope Honorius III in 1219 of the work, as did papal legate Pelagio Galvani; and Oliver of Paderborn described it in his book Historia Damiatina. These are some rare surviving writings acknowledging the Apocalypse from the medieval era.

Benjamin Weber suggests that the Crusaders coming into contact with the book was not a fortuitous accident but rather an intentional act of the local Egyptian Christian population. In 1219, the Sultan offered the Crusaders generous peace terms where they could keep Jerusalem in exchange for leaving the rest of Egypt alone. The Egyptian Christian population, hopeful of deliverance from the Caliphate promised in the Apocalypse, would have wanted to encourage the Crusaders to continue the war; providing an ancient prophecy predicting the defeat of Islam would encourage the Crusaders to continue on, assured of their ultimate victory. The Crusaders ultimately did not accept the offered treaty, although it is difficult to say how much that decision was due to the sharing of the scriptures by the local Christians. An undated version of the similar Apocalypse of Pseudo-Athanasius changed a reference to the "King of Rome" (that is, the Byzantines) to "King of the Franks", suggesting that Egyptian Christians were willing to update their predictions of the defeat of Islam to include these newcomers.

== Later manuscript history ==
It was not until the 19th and early 20th century that the work was rediscovered outside the Middle East. Margaret Dunlop Gibson published a transcription of the Arabic along with a translation into English of the first section of the Apocalypse based on a manuscript from Saint Catherine's Monastery in the Sinai Peninsula in 1901. Starting in the 1910s, Sylvain Grébaut published a series of French translations of Qalēmenṭos based on an Ethiopic manuscript from the collection of Antoine d'Abbadie, although without including the Ethiopic text. In 1930 and 1931, Alphonse Mingana published a karshuni (Arabic written with the Syriac alphabet) manuscript and English translation in the series Woodbrooke Studies. At the time, he lamented that he was unable to collate his manuscript with the translation published by Grébaut. Alessandro Bausi published in 1992 a full translated version of the Ethiopic Qalēmenṭos into Italian.

Georg Graf compiled a list of known manuscripts in 1944, and Paolo La Spisa updated the list in 2014. There are at least 42 surviving manuscripts of the work: 23 full manuscripts loosely organized into three recensions, as well as 19 manuscripts of epitomes and fragmentary sections.

The study of the work remains incomplete. Most manuscripts have not been collated or translated in a scholarly edition.

== Translations ==
The work has been translated into English in the following sources:

- Gibson, Margaret Dunlop (1901). Apocrypha Arabica. Studia Sinaitica, No. VIII. London: C. J. Clay and Sons. A translation of the first section. Based on a manuscript from Saint Catherine's Monastery in the Sinai Peninsula.
- Mingana, Alphonse (1931). Woodbrooke Studies. Vol. 3. Cambridge: W. Heffer & Sons. A translation of the second and third sections. Based on Mingana Syr. 70, a Karshuni manuscript.
