= Apocalypse of Adam =

Sethian Gnostic apocalyptic writing

The Apocalypse of Adam is a Sethian Gnostic apocalyptic writing. It is the fifth tractate in Codex V of the Nag Hammadi library, transcribed in Coptic. The date of the original work has been a point of scholarly contention because the writing lacks Christian themes and other explicit allusions. Thus, the Gnostic redeemer in the text may have been pre-Christian and influenced later New Testament writings. The text provides an interpretation of the Genesis account of creation, describes the descent of a heavenly illuminator of knowledge, and ends with an apocalyptic prophecy.

== Summary ==
Adam teaches his son Seth about his past, saying that he and Eve were created by the god Sakla out of the earth, but they were once with the eternal God and like great eternal angels. They were divided by Sakla in wrath, causing the glory in their hearts to leave them, and they lost the first knowledge that breathed in them. They recognized the god who created them and served him in fear and slavery. Adam and Eve are awakened by three persons, who help them remember the eternal being and the seed of the person to whom life has come (Seth). Adam tells Seth that he will reveal to him what he learned from the three.

A flood destroys all flesh on Earth except for those on Noah's Ark. Sakla gives the Earth to Noah and his sons to rule over in kingly fashion. Some people, sent from the knowledge of great eternal realms and angels, defy Sakla and live in knowledge of incorruptibility. Noah then divides the Earth among his sons Ham, Japheth and Shem and warns them to serve Sakla in fear and slavery. The seed of Ham and Japheth forms twelve kingdoms. Sakla again tries to destroy the pure who know of the eternal God. Fire, sulfur, and blinding mist come over the realms, and the inhabitants cannot see. But great clouds of light descend, and Abrasax, Sablo, and Gamaliel come to rescue the people and take them to the eternal realms where they will be like angels.

The illuminator of knowledge saves the pure for the third time, leaving Sakla disturbed and wondering where the higher power comes from. 13 different kingdoms each have their own belief about the origin of the illuminator. Douglas M. Parrott argues that this section was originally an independent work that is influenced by the author's Egyptian surroundings:

1. The first kingdom believes that he came from a spirit.
2. The second kingdom believes that he came from a great prophet.
3. The third kingdom believes that he came from a virgin womb and was brought to a desert place.
4. The fourth kingdom believes that he came from a virgin who was sought by Solomon and his armies.
5. The fifth kingdom believes that he came from a drop from heaven and was thrown into the sea.
6. The sixth kingdom believes that he was born of a woman who became pregnant from the desire of flowers.
7. The seventh kingdom believes that he is a drop that came from heaven to earth and was brought up by dragons.
8. The eighth kingdom believes that he came from a cloud that enveloped a rock.
9. The ninth kingdom believes that he was born of a muse who became pregnant from her own desire.
10. The tenth kingdom believes that he was born of a cloud of desire that his god loved.
11. The eleventh kingdom believes that he was cast out in the desert by his mother and was nourished by an angel.
12. The twelfth kingdom believes that he came from two luminaries.
13. The thirteenth kingdom believes that every birth of their ruler is a word, and this word received a mandate.

However, the generation without a king believes that God chose him from all the eternal realms.

The text concludes with a prophecy about a group of people who will fight against the power and be covered by a cloud of darkness. The people who do not follow the power and have a knowledge of the truth will be blessed and live forever. The text then criticizes those who have followed the power and defiled the water of life, saying their works are not of the truth. The people who follow the truth will be known up to the great eternal realms, and their words will be called words of incorruptibility and truth. The holy baptism is described as being of the eternal knowledge through those born of the word and the imperishable illuminators, who came from the holy seed Yesseus Mazareus Yessedekeus.
