= Nabi Habeel Mosque =

Mosque in Rif Dimashq, Syria

- مَسْجِد ٱلنَّبِي هَابِيْل
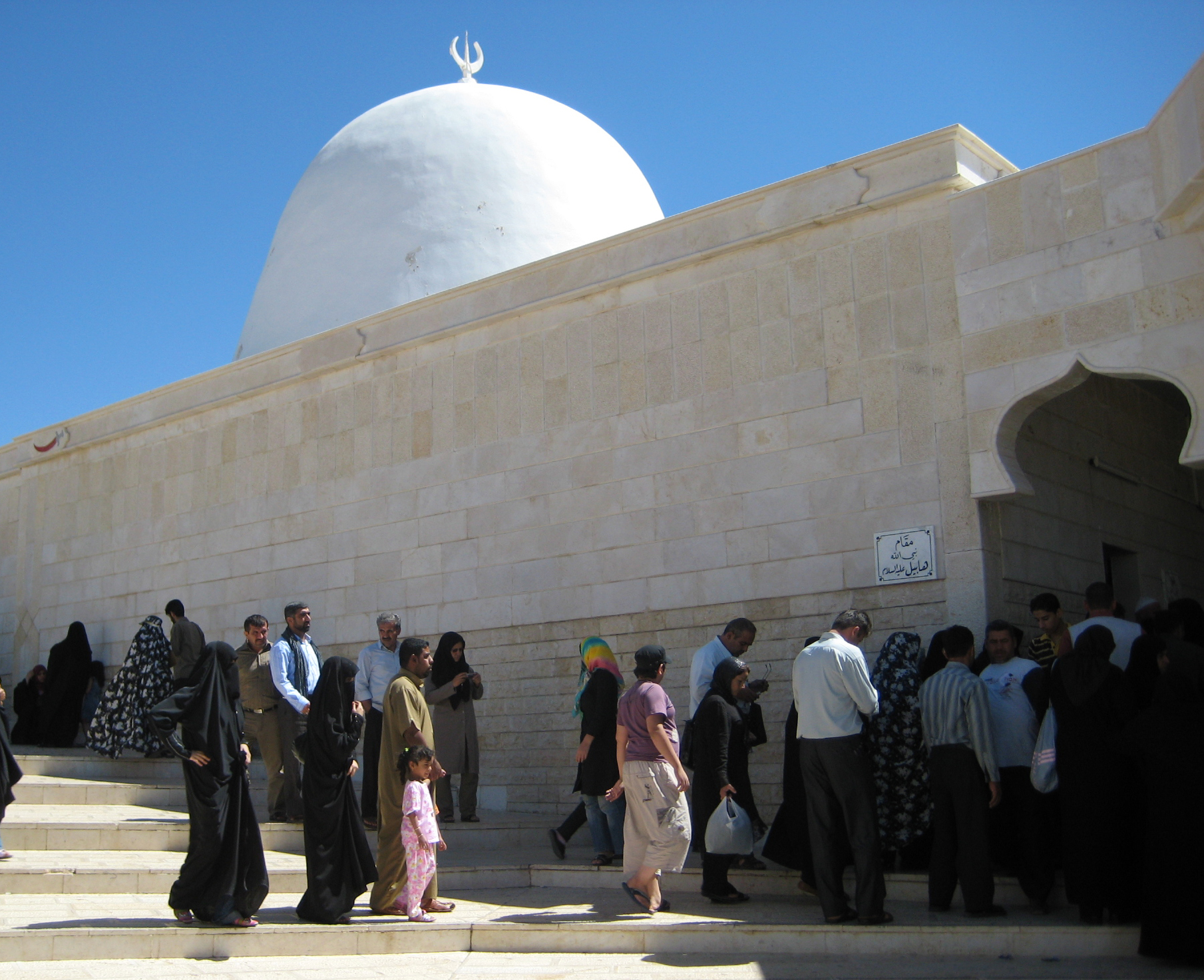
- The mausoleum of Abel, son of Adam

- Location of the mosque in Syria

Religion
- Affiliation: Islam
- Ecclesiastical or organisational status: Mosque
- Status: Active

Location
- Location: Bilad Ash-Sham
- Country: Syria
- Interactive map of Nabi Habeel Mosque
- Coordinates: 33°37′17″N 36°6′22″E

Architecture
- Type: Mosque
- Style: Islamic
- Completed: 1599 CE
- Dome: 1

The Nabi Habeel Mosque (Arabic: مَسْجِد ٱلنَّبِي هَابِيْل, romanized: Masjid An-Nabī Hābīl; Turkish: Nebi Habil Camii), or "Mosque of the Prophet Abel", is a shrine and Islamic mosque dedicated to Habeel, located on the west mountains of Damascus, near the Zabadani Valley, overlooking the villages of the Barada river (Wadi Barada),which are 15, Souk Wadi Barada, Burhlyia, kafer Alawammed, Alhusinia,Der kanon,Kfir Alzayt, Der Mkareen, Ein Alfiga, Ein Alkadra, Bascima,Alashrafia, Jdaida Alshaybani, Alhameh, kudsaia, Dummer in Syria, the Levant.

== Description ==
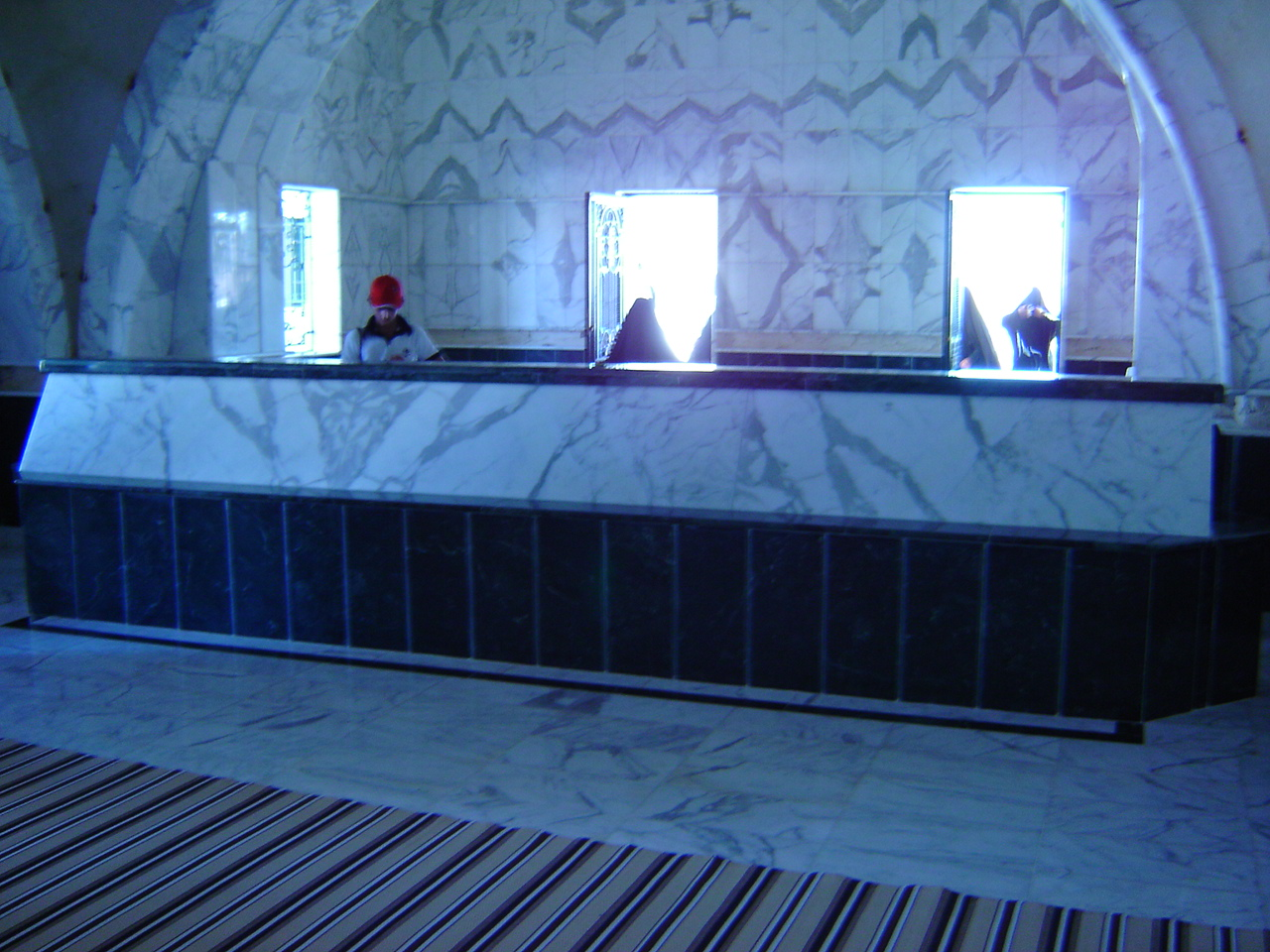
Grave of Abel within the Mosque

The mosque is believed to contain the grave of Abel (Arabic: Hābīl) the son of Adam, as believed by Muslims. The mosque was built by Ottoman Wali Ahmad Pasha in 1599, and it is said to have 40 mihrabs. As the story goes, Abel was killed by his brother Cain (Arabic: Qābīl), which is known to be the first homicide of mankind.

Inside the mosque is a 7.0-metre-long (23 ft) sarcophagus covered with green silk tapestry inscribed with verses from the Qur'an, with some locals saying that this was the site of the world's builders, including Abel.

== See also ==
- Shia Islam in Syria
- List of mosques in Syria
- Holiest sites in Islam (Shia)
