= Eve in Islam =

First woman in Islam

Ḥawwā’
- حواء; Eve
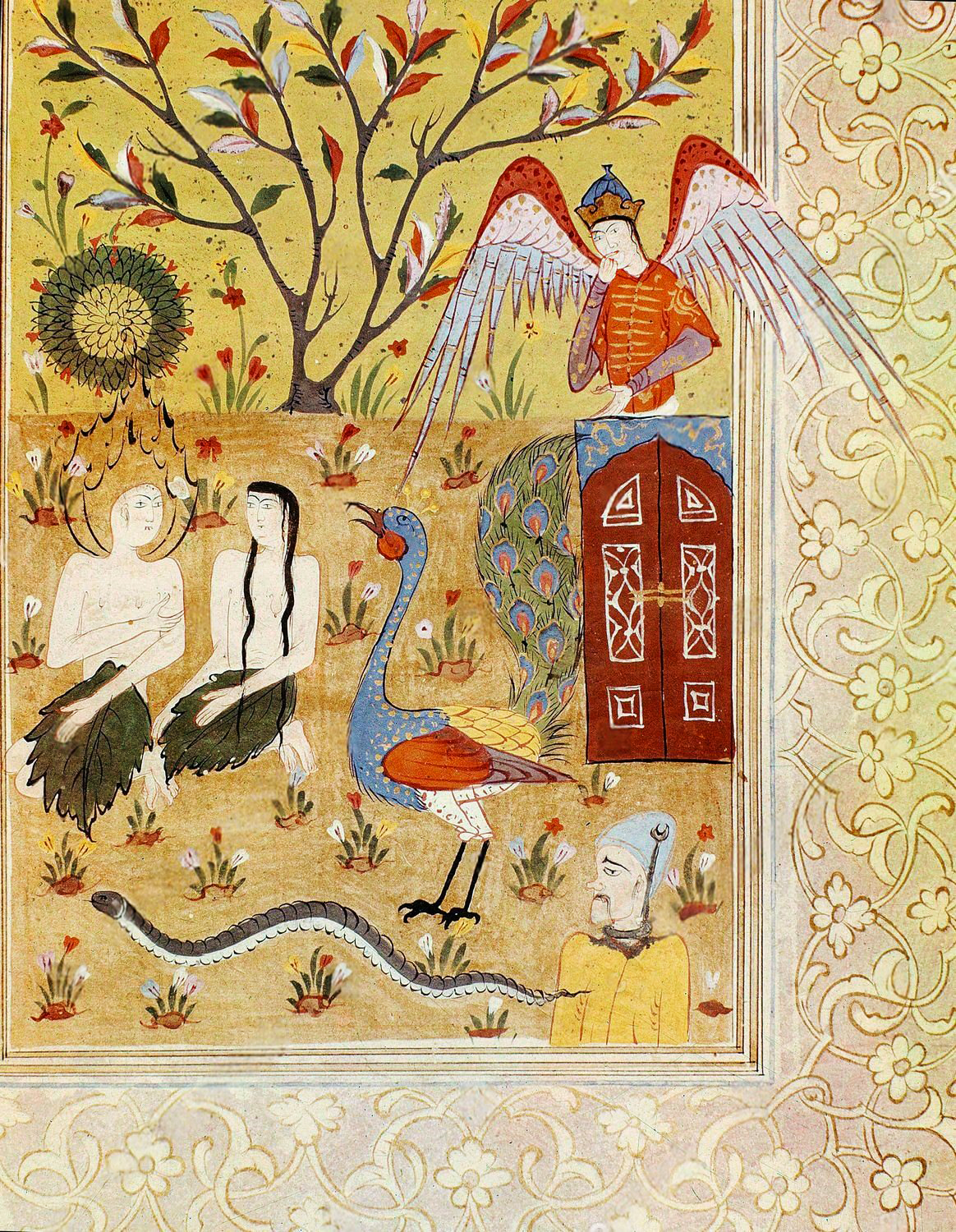
- Islamic illustration of Hawwa sitting next to Adam in the Garden.

Personal life
- Spouse: ʾĀdam
- Children: Qābīl and Hābīl, Sheth, ʿAnāq
- Known for: First woman; Mother of humanity

Religious life
- Religion: Islam

Eve (Arabic: حواء, romanized: Ḥawwā’), in Islamic theology, is believed to have been the first woman on Earth. Eve's role as the "mother of mankind" is looked upon by Muslims with reverence.

According to Islamic belief, Eve was created with Adam and brought to life by God. God placed Eve with Adam in a paradisical Garden. After Eve and Adam sinned by eating from the forbidden tree (Tree of Immortality) after God forbade her from doing so, paradise was declined to her and she was sent down to live on Earth. The Qiṣaṣ al-Anbiyāʾ (Arabic: قصص الأنبياء, lit. 'Tales of the Prophets') adds that Adam and Ḥawwāʾ, when cast out of paradise, were cast down far apart and eventually met each other at Mount Arafat. Mankind would have learned planting, harvesting, baking, repenting from Eve and Adam.

The Quranic story of Eve is seen as both literal as well as an allegory for human relationship towards God. Islam does not necessarily adhere to young Earth creationism, and most Muslims believe that life on Earth predates Eve and Adam.

== Qur'anic narrative ==
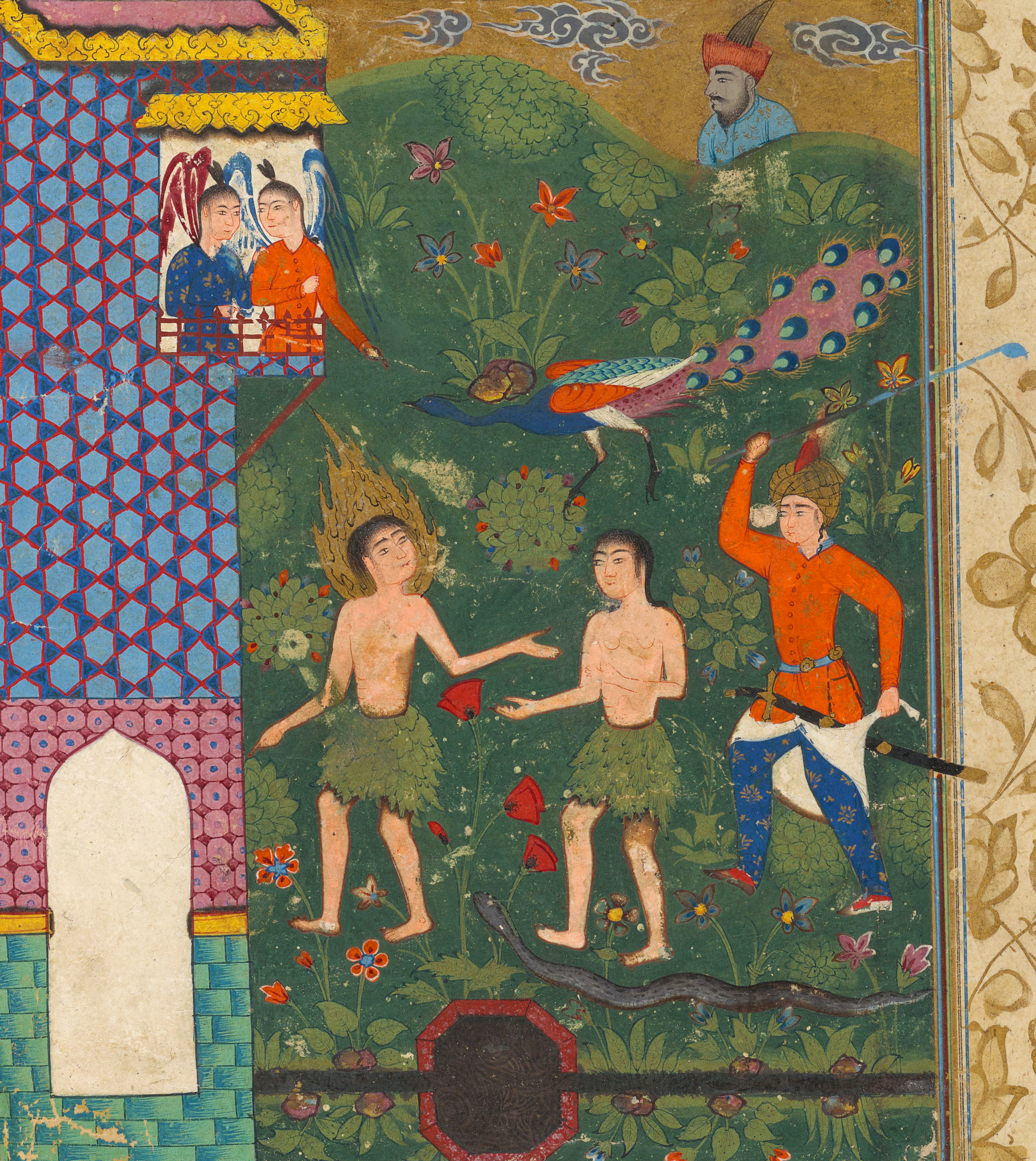
The Islamic prophet Adam and Hawwa being nakedly expelled from the Garden.

Adam's spouse Eve is mentioned in the Quran in 2:30–39, 7:11–25, 15:26–42, 17:61–65, 18:50-51, 20:110–124, and 38:71–85, but the name "Eve" (Arabic: حواء, Ḥawwā’) is never revealed or used in the Quran. Eve is mentioned by name only in hadith.

Accounts of Adam and Eve in Islamic texts, which include the Quran and the books of Sunnah, are similar but different from those of the Torah and Bible. The Quran relates an account in which God created "one soul and created from it its mate and dispersed from both of them many men and women" (Q4:1), but there are hadiths that support the creation of woman "from a rib" (Sahih Bukhari 4:55:548, Sahih Bukhari 7:62:114, Sahih Muslim 8:3467, Sahih Muslim 8:3468). Eve is not blamed for enticing Adam to eat the forbidden fruit (nor is there the concept of original sin). On the contrary, the Quran indicates that "they ate of it" and were both to blame for that transgression (Quran 20:121–122).

There are subsequent hadiths (narrated by Abu Hurairah) that hold that Muhammad designates Eve as the epitome of female betrayal. "Narrated Abu Hurrairah: The Prophet said, 'Were it not for Bani Israel, meat would not decay; and were it not for Eve, no woman would ever betray her husband.'" (Sahih Bukhari, Hadith 611, Volume 55). An identical version is found in Sahih Muslim, "Abu Hurrairah reported Allah's Messenger as saying: Had it not been for Eve, woman would have never acted unfaithfully towards her husband." (Hadith 3471, Volume 8).

== See also ==
- Legends and the Qur'an
- Adam and Eve in Mormonism
- Tomb of Eve

== Notes ==
=== Bibliography ===
- Reynolds, Gabriel Said (2018). The Qurʾān and the Bible: Text and Commentary. Yale University Press. ISBN 978-0-300-18132-6.
