= List of names for the biblical nameless =

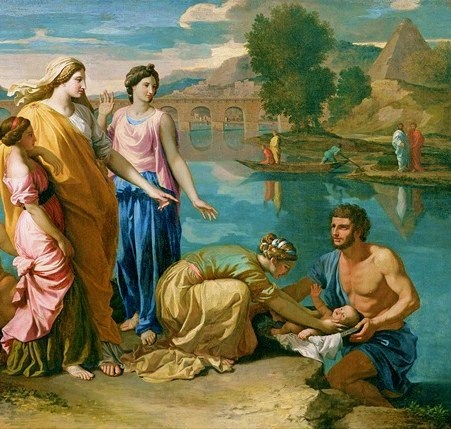
Nicolas Poussin's Moses rescued from the Nile (1638) shows Pharaoh's daughter, who is unnamed in the Bible, but called Bithiah in Jewish tradition.

Some people who appear in the Bible but whose names are not given there have names that are given in Jewish religious texts, Christian sacred tradition, or apocryphal texts.

== Hebrew Bible ==
=== Serpent of Genesis ===
Revelation 12 is thought to identify the serpent with Satan, unlike the pseudepigraphical-apocryphal Apocalypse of Moses (Vita Adae et Evae) where the Devil works with the serpent.

=== Wives of the antediluvian patriarchs ===
The pseudepigraphical Book of Jubilees provides names for a host of otherwise unnamed biblical characters, including wives for most of the antediluvian patriarchs. The last of these is Noah's wife, to whom it gives the name of Emzara. Other Jewish traditional sources contain many different names for Noah's wife.

The Book of Jubilees says that Awan was Adam and Eve's first daughter. Their second daughter Azura married Seth. For many of the early wives in the series, Jubilees notes that the patriarchs married their sisters.

Patriarch	Wife
Cain	Âwân; Nod
Seth	Azûrâ
Enos	Nôâm
Kenan	Mûalêlêth
Mahalalel	Dinah
Jared	Baraka
Enoch	Edna
Methuselah	Edna
Lamech (Seth's line)	Betenos
Noah	Emzârâ; Naamah

The Cave of Treasures and the earlier Kitab al-Magall (part of Clementine literature) name entirely different women as the wives of the patriarchs, with considerable variations among the extant copies.

The Muslim historian Ibn Ishaq (c. 750), as cited in al-Tabari (c. 915), provides names for these wives which are generally similar to those in Jubilees, but he makes them Cainites rather than Sethites, despite clearly stating elsewhere that none of Noah's ancestors were descended from Cain.

=== Cain and Abel's sisters ===
Name: Aclima (or Calmana or Luluwa)
source: Golden Legend, which also tells stories about many of the saints

Appears in the Bible at: Genesis 4:17

Name: Delbora
source: Golden Legend, which also tells stories about many of the saints

Appears in the Bible at: Genesis 4

See also: Balbira and Kalmana, Azura and Awan for alternate traditions of names.

=== Noah's wife ===
Name: Naamah
Source: Midrash Genesis Rabbah 23:4

Appears in the Bible at: Genesis 4:22; Gen. 7:7

Daughter of Lamech and Zillah and sister of Tubal-cain (Gen. iv. 22). According to Abba ben Kahana, Naamah was Noah's wife and was called "Naamah" (pleasant) because her conduct was pleasing to God. But the majority of the rabbis reject this statement, declaring that Naamah was an idolatrous woman who sang "pleasant" songs to idols.

See also Wives aboard the Ark for a list of traditional names given to the wives of Noah and his sons Shem, Ham, and Japheth.

=== Ham's wife ===
Name: Egyptus
Source: Book of Abraham

Appears in the Bible in Genesis 7 and 6

The Mormon Book of Abraham, first published in 1842, mentions Egyptus (Abraham 1:23) as being the name of Ham's wife; his daughter apparently had the same name (v. 25).

=== Nimrod's wife ===
A large body of legend has attached itself to Nimrod, whose brief mention in Genesis merely makes him "a mighty hunter in the face of the Lord". (The biblical account makes no mention of a wife at all.) These legends usually make Nimrod to be a sinister figure, and they reach their peak in Hislop's The Two Babylons, which make Nimrod and his wife Semiramis to be the original authors of every false and pagan religion.

=== Mother of Abraham ===
Name: Amatlai bat Karnevo
Source: Babylonian Talmud, Bava Batra 91a

Appears in the Bible at: Book of Genesis

=== Lot's married daughter ===
Name: Paltith
Source: Book of Jasher 19:24

Appears in the Bible at: Book of Genesis

=== Lot's wife ===
Name: Ado (or Edith, or Erith)
Source: Book of Jasher 19:52 (Ado); Pirkei De-Rabbi Eliezer (Edith)

Appears in the Bible at: Book of Genesis

=== Laban's wife ===
Name: Adinah
Source: Book of Jasher 28:28

Appears in the Bible at: Book of Genesis

=== Potiphar's wife ===
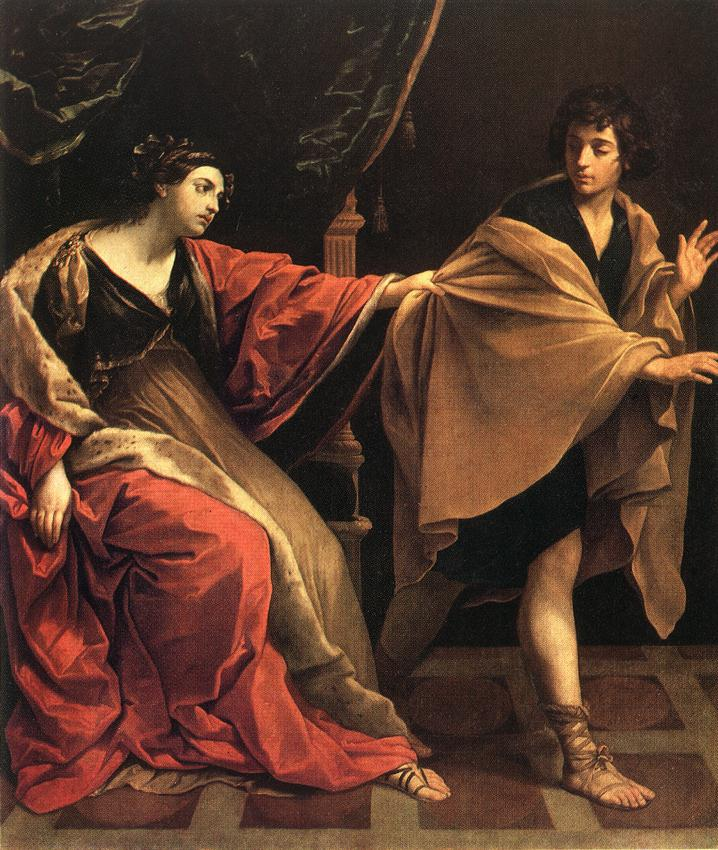
Joseph and Potiphar's Wife, by Guido Reni 1631

Name: Zuleikha
Source: The Sefer Hayyashar, a book of Jewish lore published in Venice in 1625. Also, the Persian mystical poem "Yusuf and Zulaikha" by Jami, 15th century.

Appears in the Bible at: Genesis 39:12

Potiphar's wife attempted to seduce Joseph in Egypt.

=== Pharaoh's daughter ===
Name: Merris
Source: Eusebius of Caesarea (Preparation for the Gospel 9.15)

Name: Merrhoe
Source: Eustathius of Antioch (Commentary on Hexameron MPG 18.785)

Name: Thermutis
Source: Flavius Josephus

Name: Bithiah or Bitya
Source: Leviticus Rabbah

Name: Sobekneferu or Neferusobek
Source: Unwrapping the Pharaohs
Ashton, John; Down, David (22 September 2006). "Chapter 12: Pharaohs of the Oppression". Unwrapping the Pharaohs. Master Books. pp. 87–90. ISBN 978-0-890-51468-9.

Appears in the Bible at: Exodus 2

Pharaoh's daughter, who drew Moses out of the water, is known as Bithiah in Jewish tradition (identifying her with the "Pharaoh's daughter Bithiah" in 1 Chronicles 4:18).

=== Simeon's wife ===
Name: Bunah
Source: Book of Jasher 34:36 Legends of the Jews Volume 1 Chapter 6

Name: Dinah
Source: Midrash Bereshit Rabba 80:11. After Simeon and Levi slaughtered the men of Shechem, Dinah refused to go with them unless someone married her and raised the child of Prince Chamor she was carrying as his own. Simeon did this.

Appears in the Bible at: Genesis 34

=== Pharaoh's magicians ===
Names: Jannes and Jambres
Source: 2 Timothy 3:8, Book of Jasher chapter 79, Antiquities of the Jews Book 2, Aquarian Gospel of Jesus the Christ Chapter 109, Ante-Nicene Fathers, Vol. VIII, Easton's Bible Dictionary, The Book of the Bee Chapter 30, Nicene and Post-Nicene Fathers, Vol. XIII, Legends of the Jews Volume 2 Chapter 4, Chronicles of Jerahmeel, Papyrus Chester Beatty XVI: Apocryphon of Jannes and Jambres

Appears in the Bible at: Exodus 7

The names of Jannes and Jambres, or Jannes and Mambres, were well known through the ancient world as magicians. In this instance, nameless characters from the Hebrew Bible are given names in the New Testament. Their names also appear in numerous Jewish texts.

=== The Cushitic wife of Moses ===
Name: Tharbis
Source: Flavius Josephus, Jewish Antiquities, Book II, Chapter 10

Name: Adoniah
Source: Book of Jasher, 23.5–25.5

Appears in the Bible at: Numbers 12

=== Job's wives ===
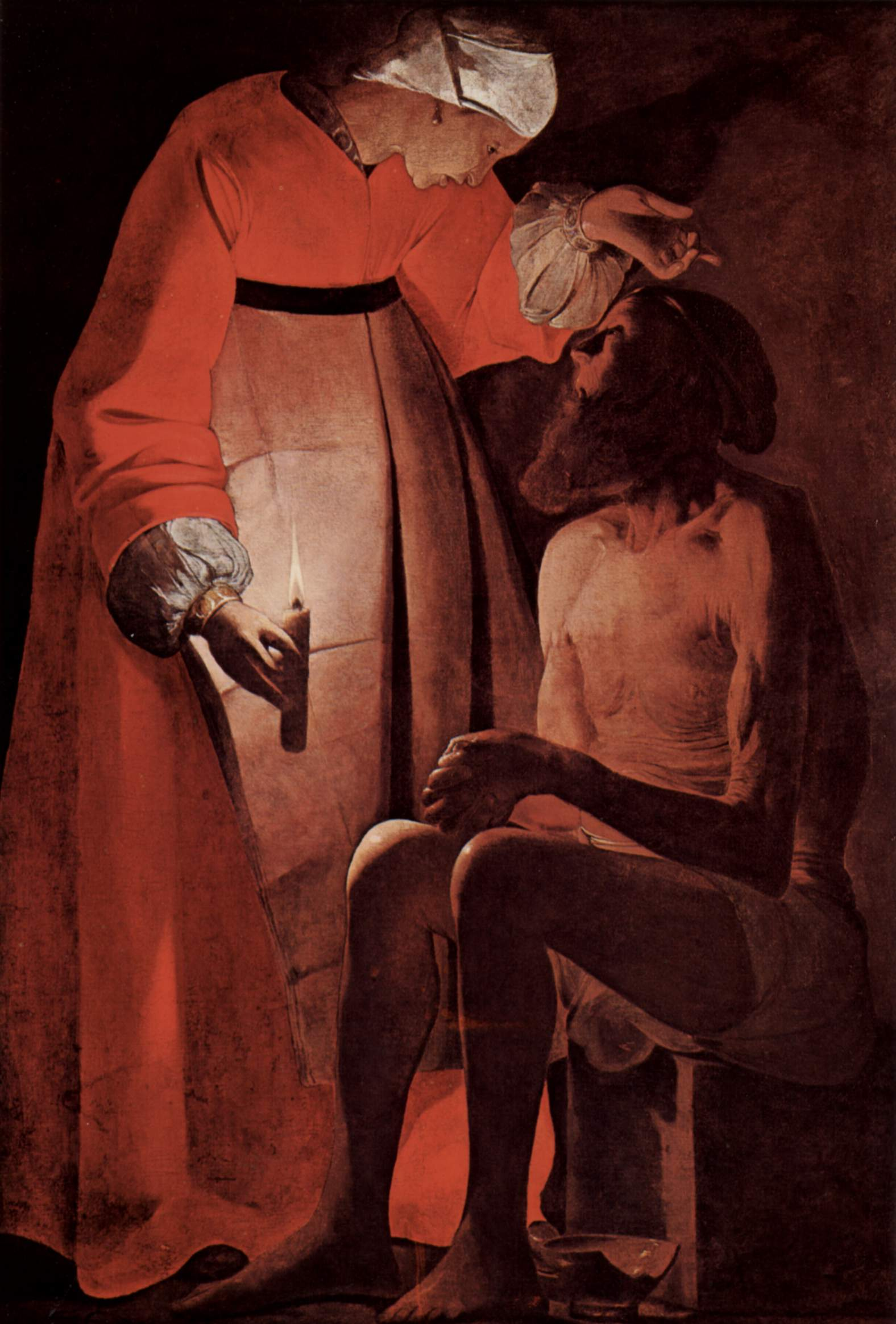
Georges de La Tour, Job Taunted by his Wife.

Names: Sitis, Dinah
Source: The apocryphal Testament of Job

Appears in the Bible at: Book of Job

Apocryphal Jewish folklore says that Sitis, or Sitidos, was Job's first wife, who died during his trials. After his temptation was over, the same sources say that Job remarried Dinah, Jacob's daughter who appears in Genesis.

Name: Raḥma
Source: Islamic tradition

The source does not tell which wife of Job has this name.

=== Jephthah's daughter ===
Name: Seila
Source: Liber Antiquitatum Biblicarum
Name: Adah
Source: Order of the Eastern Star

Appears in the Bible at: Judges 11

The Liber Antiquitatum Biblicarum falsely ascribes itself to the Jewish author Philo. It in fact did not surface until the sixteenth century; see Works of Philo.

=== Samson's mother ===
Name: Tzelelponit
Source: Babylonian Talmud, Bava Batra 91a

Appears in the Bible at: Book of Judges 13

=== David's mother ===
Name: Nitzevet bat Adael
Source: Babylonian Talmud, Bava Batra 91a

Appears in the Bible at: Book of Samuel

=== The Witch of Endor ===
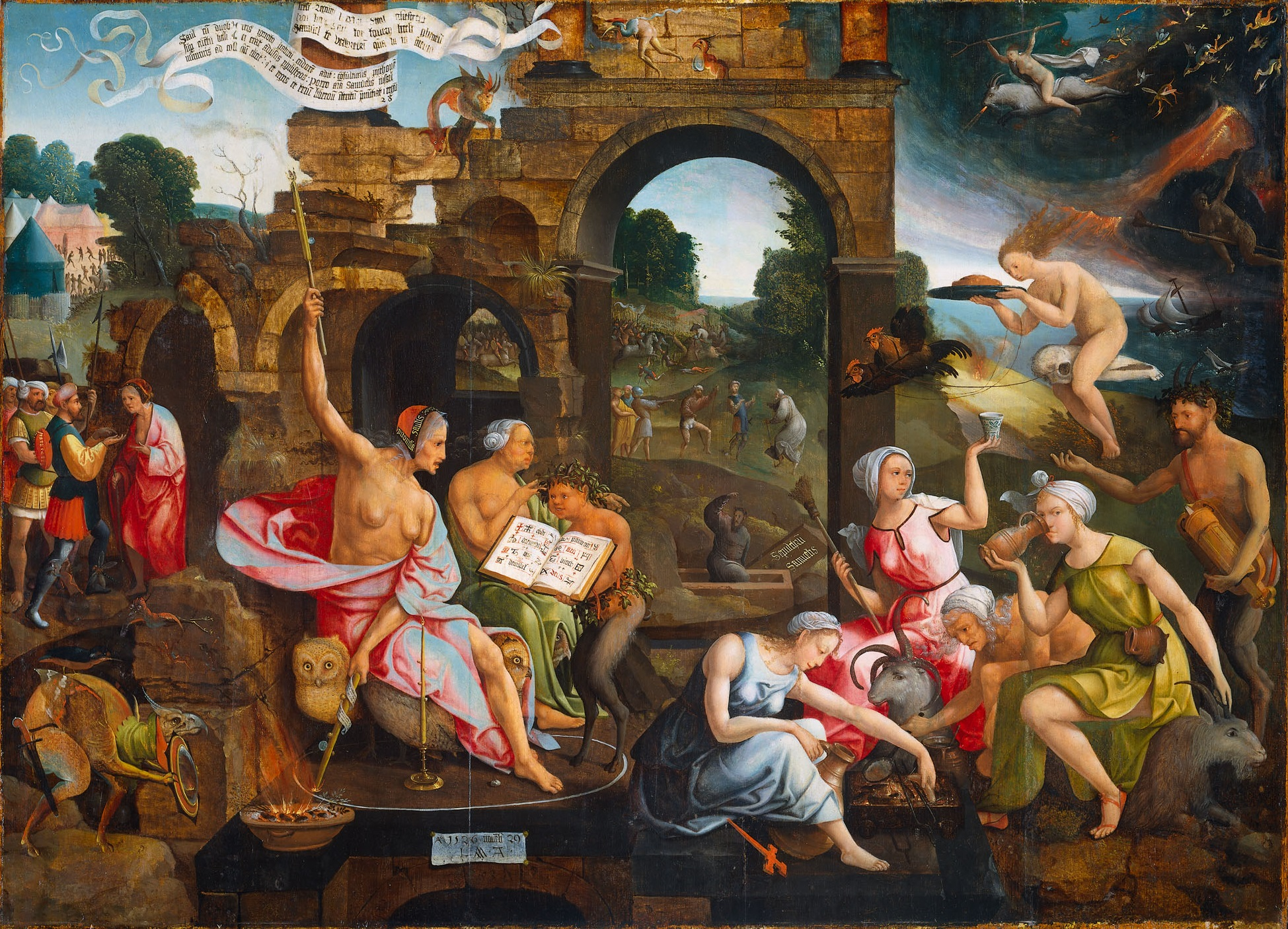
Saul and the Witch of Endor by Jacob Cornelisz van Oostsanen, 1526.

Name: Sedecla
Source: Liber Antiquitatum Biblicarum

Appears in the Bible at: 1 Samuel 28

=== The Man of God ===
Name: Iddo or Jadon

Named Jadon by Josephus in The Antiquities of the Jews VIII.8.5

Appears in the Bible at: 2 Chronicles 12:15 and 1 Kings 13

=== The wise woman of Abel ===
Name: Serah
Source: Aggadic Midrash

Appears in the Bible at: 2 Samuel 20

=== The Queen of Sheba ===
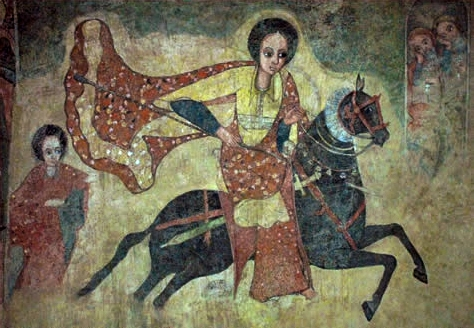
An Ethiopian fresco of the Queen of Sheba travelling to Solomon.

Name: Makeda
Source: Traditional Ethiopian lore surrounding Emperor Menelik I; see the Kebra Nagast

Name: Nicaule
Source: Josephus

Name: Bilqis
Source: Islamic traditions

Appears in the Bible at: 1 Kings 10; 2 Chronicles 9

According to Ethiopian traditions, the Queen of Sheba returned to Ethiopia pregnant with King Solomon's child. She bore Solomon a son that went on to found a dynasty that ruled Ethiopia until the fall of Emperor Haile Selassie in 1974.

=== Jeroboam's wife ===
Name: Ano
Source: Septuagint

Appears in the Bible at: 1 Kings 14

=== Haman's mother ===
Name: Amatlai bat Orevti
Source: Babylonian Talmud, Bava Batra 91a

Appears in the Bible at: Book of Esther

== Old Testament deuterocanonicals ==
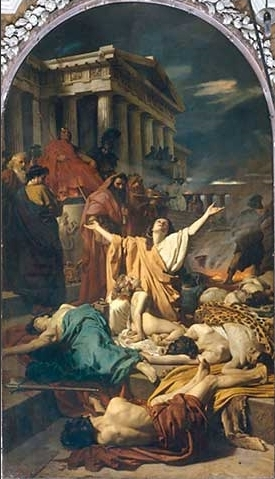
Ciseri's Martyrdom of the Seven Maccabees (1863) depicts the woman with seven sons.

The Deuterocanonical books, sometimes called the "Apocrypha", are considered canonical by Catholics, Eastern Orthodox, and Oriental Orthodox (though these churches' lists of books differ slightly from each other).

=== Seven Maccabees and their mother ===
Name: Habroun, Hebsoun, Bakhous, Adai, Tarsai, Maqbai and Yawnothon.
Source: Syriac tradition

Name: Abim, Antonius, Gurias, Eleazar, Eusebonus, Alimus and Marcellus.
Source: Eastern Orthodox Tradition

The woman with seven sons is a Jewish martyr who is unnamed in 2 Maccabees 7, but is named Hannah, Miriam, Shamuna and Solomonia in other sources. According to Eastern Orthodox tradition, her sons, the "Holy Maccabean Martyrs" (not to be confused with the martyrs in the Ethiopian book of Meqabyan), are named Abim, Antonius, Gurias, Eleazar, Eusebonus, Alimus and Marcellus. According to the Syriac Maronite Fenqitho (book of festal offices), the name of the mother is Shmooni while her sons are Habroun, Hebsoun, Bakhous, Adai, Tarsai, Maqbai and Yawnothon.

=== The seven Archangels ===
Name: Michael, Gabriel, Raphael, Uriel, Simiel, Oriphiel, and Raguel.
Source: Pope Gregory I

Name: Michael, Gabriel, Raphael, Uriel, Selaphiel, Jegudiel and Barachiel
Source: Byzantine Catholic and Eastern Orthodox Tradition

Name: Michael, Gabriel, Raphael, Uriel, Camael, Jophiel, and Zadkiel.
Source: Pseudo-Dionysius

Name: Michael, Gabriel, Raphael, Suriel, Zadkiel, Sarathiel, and Ananiel.
Source: Coptic Orthodox tradition

Name: Michael, Gabriel, Raphael, Uriel, Sarakiel, Remiel and Raguel
Source: Book of the Watchers

Tobit 12:15 reads "I am Raphael, one of the seven holy angels who present the prayers of the saints and enter into the presence of the glory of the Holy One." The Archangel Michael is named in the Book of Daniel, and Gabriel is named in the Gospel of Luke. The other four archangels are unnamed.

The Book of Enoch, deuterocanonical in the Ethiopian Orthodox Church, names the remaining four archangels Uriel, Raguel, Zerachiel, and Ramiel. Other sources name them Uriel, Izidkiel, Haniel, and Kepharel. In the Coptic Orthodox Church the names of these four archangels are given as Suriel, Sedakiel, Sarathiel and Ananiel. Several other sets of names have also been given.

== New Testament ==
=== The Magi ===
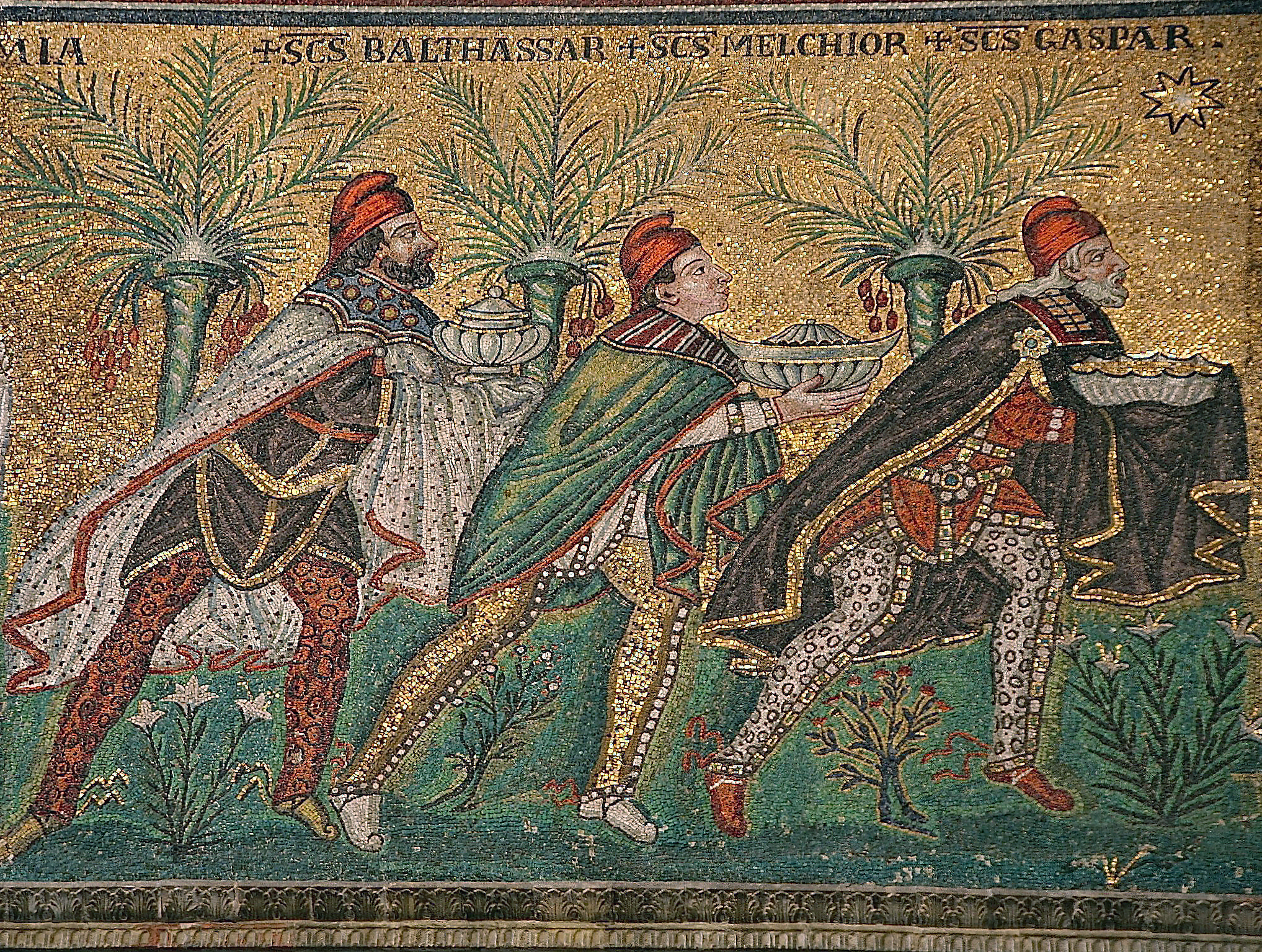
The Three Wise Men are given the names Caspar, Melchior, and Balthasar in this late 6th century mosaic from the Basilica of Saint Apollinarius in Ravenna, Italy.

- Names: Balthasar, Melqon, Gaspar

Source: Armenisches Kindheitsevangelium

- Names: Balthasar, Melchior, and Caspar (or Gaspar)

Source: European folklore

- Names: Basanater, Hor, and Karsudan

Source: The Book of Adam, an apocryphal Ethiopian text

- Names: Larvandad, Hormisdas, and Gushnasaph

Source: Syriac Christian folklore

- Names: Manatho, Alchor, and Gaspar

Source: White Shrine of Jerusalem - Masonic

Appear in the Bible at Matthew 2.

The Gospel does not state that there were, in fact, three magi or when exactly they visited Jesus, only that multiple magi brought three gifts: gold, frankincense, and myrrh. Nevertheless, the number of magi is usually extrapolated from the number of gifts, and the three wise men are a staple of Christian nativity scenes. While the European names have enjoyed the most publicity, other faith traditions have different versions. According to the Armenisches Kindheitsevangelium, the three magi were brothers and kings, namely Balthasar, king of India; Melqon, king of Persia; and Gaspar, king of Arabia. The Chinese Christian Church believes that the astronomer Liu Xiang was one of the wise men.

=== The Nativity shepherds ===
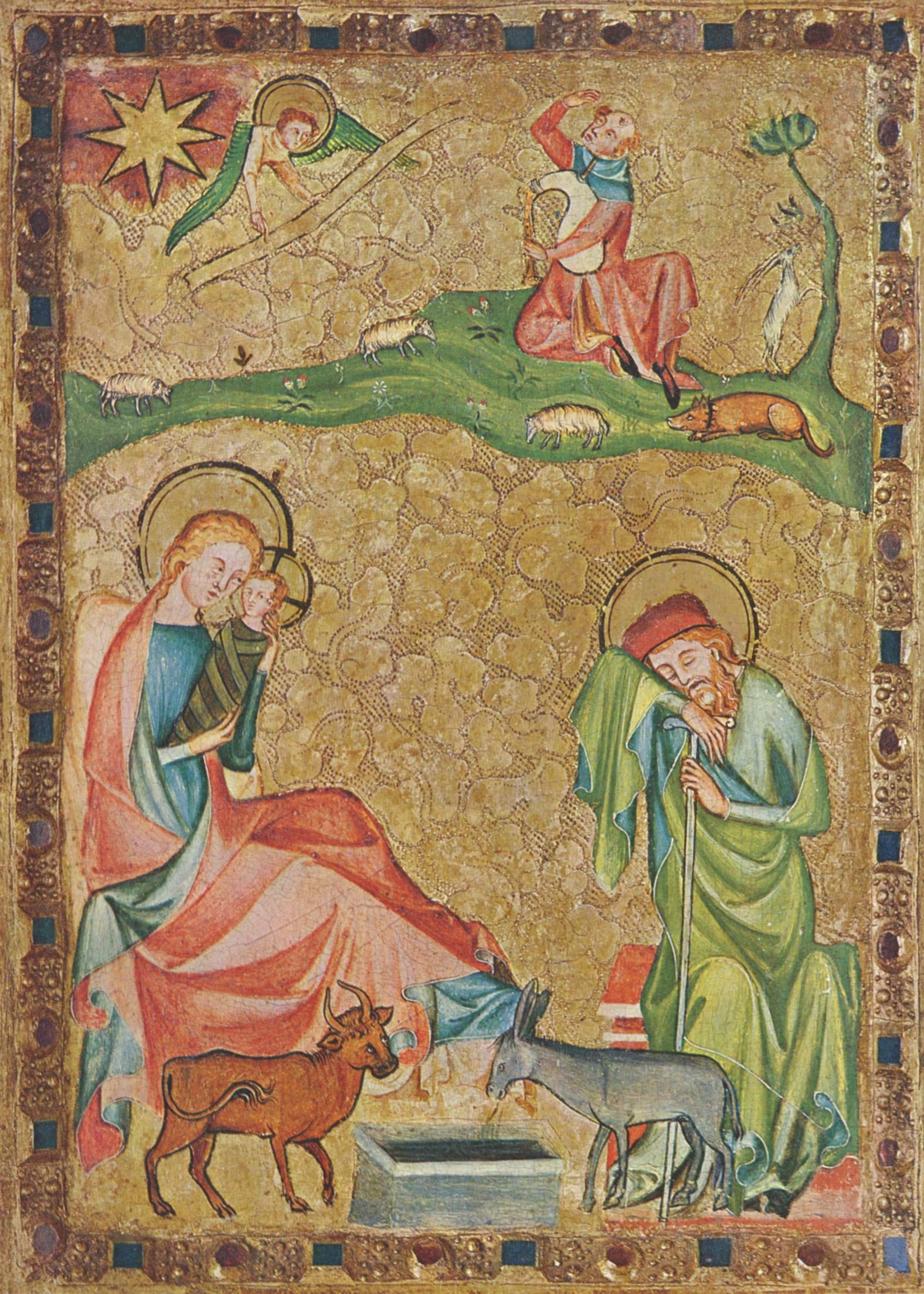
The Shepherds

- Names: Asher, Zebulun, Justus, Nicodemus, Joseph, Barshabba, and Jose

Source: The Syrian Book of the Bee written by Bishop Shelemon in the Aramaic language in the thirteenth century.

Appear in the Bible at Luke 2.

=== Jesus' sisters ===
- Names: Maria

Source: Gospel of Philip

- Names: Assia and Lydia

Source: History of Joseph the Carpenter

- Names: Maria or Anna, Salomé

Source: Epiphanius of Salamis

- Names: Martha, Esther, and Salome

Source: Hippolytus of Thebes, Chronicle

That Jesus had sisters is mentioned in Mark 6:3 and Matthew 13:55–56, although their exact number is not specified in either gospel. See Brothers of Jesus § Jesus' brothers and sisters.

The various versions of Epiphanius differ on whether one of the sisters was named Maria or Anna.

=== The Innocents ===
- Names: Sicarius of Brantôme, St. Memorius

Source: St. Helena

Appears in the Bible at: Matthew 2:6–18.

=== Herodias' daughter ===
- Name: Salome

Source: The Jewish Antiquities of Josephus, although that reference does not connect her with John the Baptist.

Appears in the Bible at Matthew 14, Mark 6.

=== Peter's wife ===
- Name: Perpetua

Source: Acts of Peter and The Passion of Saints Perpetua and Felicity

=== Syrophoenician woman ===
- Name: Justa

Source: 3rd century pseudo-Clementine homily

Appears in the Bible at Matthew 15, Mark 7. According to the same source, her daughter was Berenice.

=== The child with Jesus ===
- Name: Ignatius

Source: Early Christian Tradition

Appears in the Bible at Mark 9.

Several early Christian writers recorded a legend that the child whom Jesus took in his arms in Mark 9 was St. Ignatius of Antioch.

=== Hæmorrhaging woman ===
- Name: Berenice

Source: Apocryphal Gospel of Nicodemus

- Name: Veronica

Source: Latin translation of the apocryphal Gospel of Nicodemus (Gos. Nicodemus 5:26)

Appears in the Bible at Matthew 9:20–22.

Veronica is a Latin variant of Berenice (Greek: Βερενίκη). Veronica or Berenice obtained some of Jesus' blood on a cloth at the Crucifixion (see also: Veil of Veronica). Tradition identifies her with the woman who was healed of a bleeding discharge in the Gospel.

=== Samaritan woman at the well ===
- Name: Photini

Source: Eastern Orthodox Church Tradition

Appears in the Bible at John 4:5–42.

In the tradition of the Eastern Orthodox Church, the name of the woman at the well when she met Jesus is unknown, but she became a follower of Christ, received the name Photini in baptism, proclaimed the Gospel over a wide area, and was later martyred. She is recognized as a saint in the Eastern Orthodox Church.

=== Damned rich man ===
- Name: Nineveh

Source: Coptic folklore

- Name: Phineas

Source: Pseudo-Cyprian, De pascha computus

- Name: Dives

Source: European Christian folklore

Appears in the Bible at Luke 16:19–31.

Dives is simply Latin for "rich", and as such may not count as a proper name. The story of the blessed Lazarus and the damned rich man is widely recognised under the title of Dives and Lazarus, which may have resulted in this word being taken for a proper name.

=== Woman taken in adultery ===
- Name: Mary Magdalene

Source: Western Christian tradition

Appears in the Bible at John 8.

A long-standing Western Christian tradition first attested by Pope Gregory I identifies the woman taken in adultery with Mary Magdalene, and also with Mary of Bethany. Jesus had exorcised seven demons out of Mary Magdalene (Mark 16:9), and Mary Magdalene appears prominently in the several accounts of Jesus' entombment and resurrection, but there is no indication in the Bible that clearly states that Mary Magdalene was the same person as the adulteress forgiven by Jesus. Roman Catholics also have identified Mary Magdalene as the weeping woman who was a sinner, and who anoints Jesus' feet in Luke 7:36–50, and while the Church has dropped this interpretation to a degree, this remains one of her more famous portrayals.

The Eastern Orthodox Church has never identified Mary Magdalene as either the woman taken in adultery, or the sinful woman who anointed Jesus' feet.

=== The man born blind ===
- Name: Celidonius

Source: Christian tradition

Appears in the Bible at John 9:1–38.

=== Pontius Pilate's wife ===
- Name: Claudia, Procla, Procula, Perpetua or Claudia Procles

Source: European folklore; Dolorous Passion of our Lord Jesus Christ (as "Claudia Procles")

Appears in the Bible at Matthew 27:19.

During the trial of Jesus the wife of Pontius Pilate sent a message to him saying, "Have nothing to do with that just man; for I have suffered many things this day in a dream because of him."

The proposed names of Procla and Procula may not be names at all, but simply a form of Pilate's official title of Procurator, indicating that she was the Procurator's wife.

=== Thieves crucified with Jesus ===
- Names: Titus and Dumachus

Source: Arabic Gospel of the Infancy of the Saviour

- Names: Dismas and Gestas (or Gesmas)

Source: Acts of Pilate

- Names: Demas (the good thief)

Source: Narrative of Joseph of Arimathea

- Name: Zoatham/Zoathan (the good thief)

Source: Codex Colbertinus

- Name: Rakh (the good thief)

Source: Russian Orthodox tradition

Appear in the Bible at: Matthew 27, Mark 15, Luke 23, John 19.

The good thief is revered under the name Saint Dismas in the Catholic Church and the Coptic Orthodox Church.

=== Soldier who pierced Jesus with a spear ===
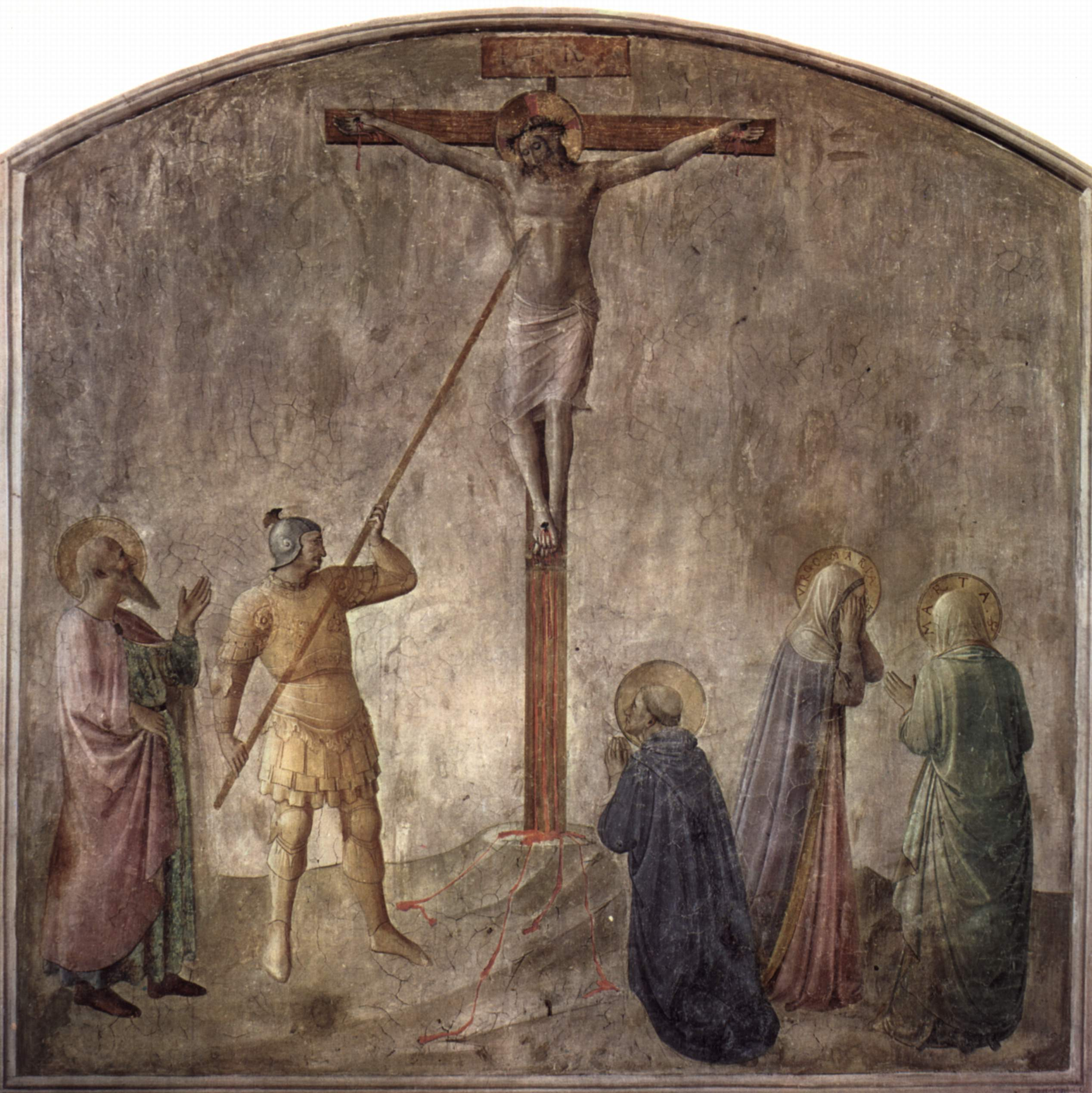
Jesus' side is pierced with a spear, Fra Angelico (circa 1440), Dominican monastery of San Marco, Florence

- Name: Longinus

Source: Apocryphal Gospel of Nicodemus (Gos. Nicodemus 7:8)

Appears in the Bible at John 19:34.

In tradition, he is called Cassius before his conversion to Christianity. The Lance of Longinus, also known as the Spear of Destiny, is supposedly preserved as a relic, and various miracles are said to be worked through it.

=== Man who offered Jesus vinegar ===
- Name: Stephaton

Source: Codex Egberti, 10th century

Appears in the Bible at Matthew 27:48, Mark 15:36, and John 19:29–30.

=== Guard(s) at Jesus' tomb ===
- Name of centurion: Petronius

Source: Apocryphal Gospel of Peter (Gos. Peter 8)

- Names of soldiers: Issachar, Gad, Matthias, Barnabas, Simon

Source: The Book of the Bee

Appears in the Bible at Matthew 27:62–66. Centurion possibly appears also in the Bible at Matthew 27:54 as a centurion saying “Truly this man was God’s Son!”.

=== Ethiopian Eunuch baptized by the deacon Philip ===
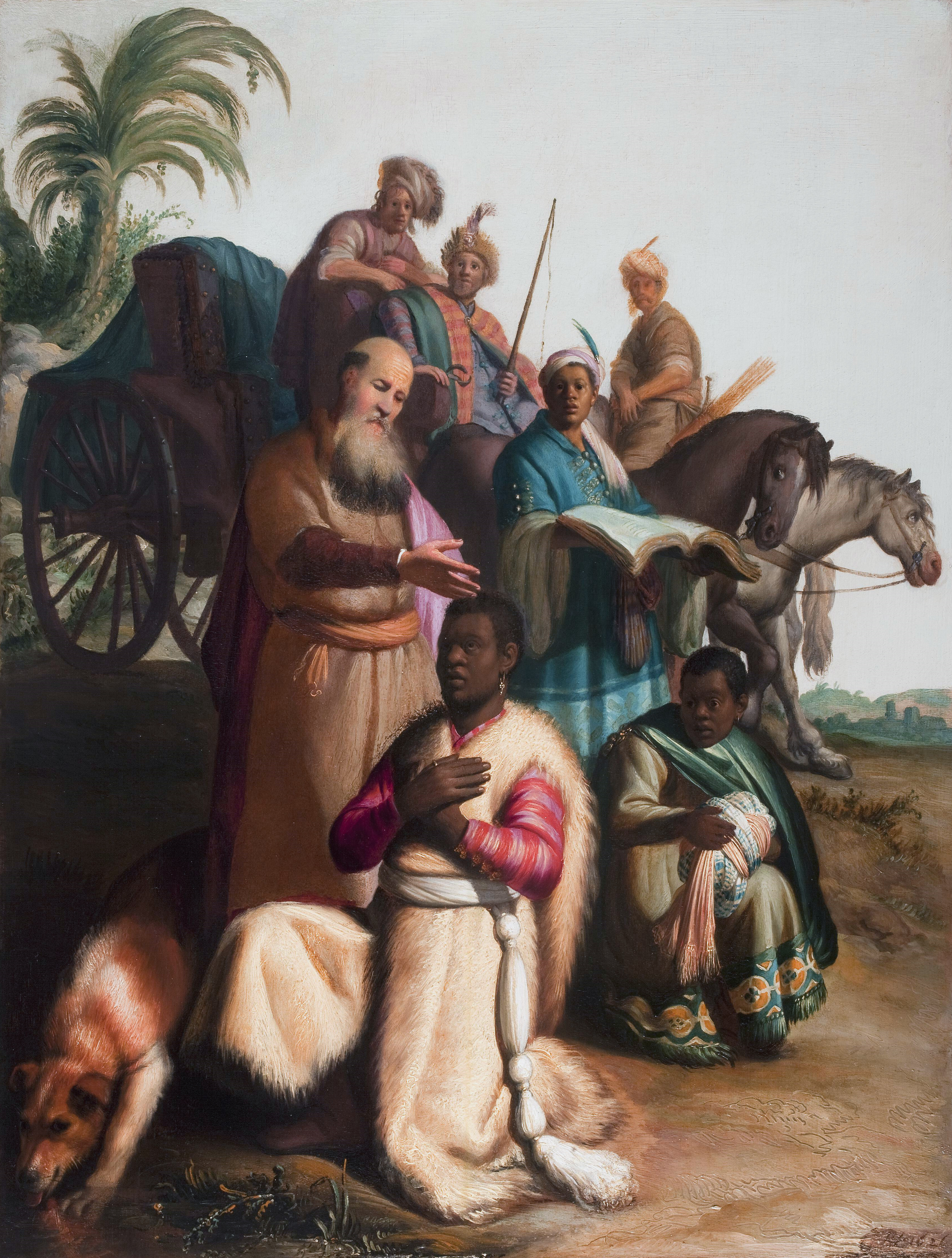
Rembrandt, The Baptism of the Eunuch, 1626.

- Name: Simeon Bachos

Source: Adversus haereses (Against the Heresies, an early anti-Gnostic theological work) 3:12:8 (180 AD)

- Name: Bachos

Source: Ethiopian Orthodox Tewahedo tradition

- Name: Djan Darada

Source: Russian Orthodox Church tradition

Appears in the Bible at Acts of the Apostles 8:27.

In Eastern Orthodox tradition he is also identified with Simeon Niger.

=== Daughters of Philip ===
- Name: Hermione; Eutychis; Irais and Chariline

Source: Traditional. See Daughters of Philip

Appears in the Bible at Acts of the Apostles 21:8-9.

== See also ==
- Seventy Disciples
