= Twin sisters of Cain and Abel =

Characters in some Abrahamic religions

While the book of Genesis does not explicitly mention any sisters of Cain nor Abel, the sisters appear in other texts of Abrahamic religions, explaining where Cain acquired a wife (mentioned in Genesis 4:17). The names of the first daughters of Adam and Eve differ widely between sources, but they typically are presented as twin sisters born with Cain and Abel respectively.

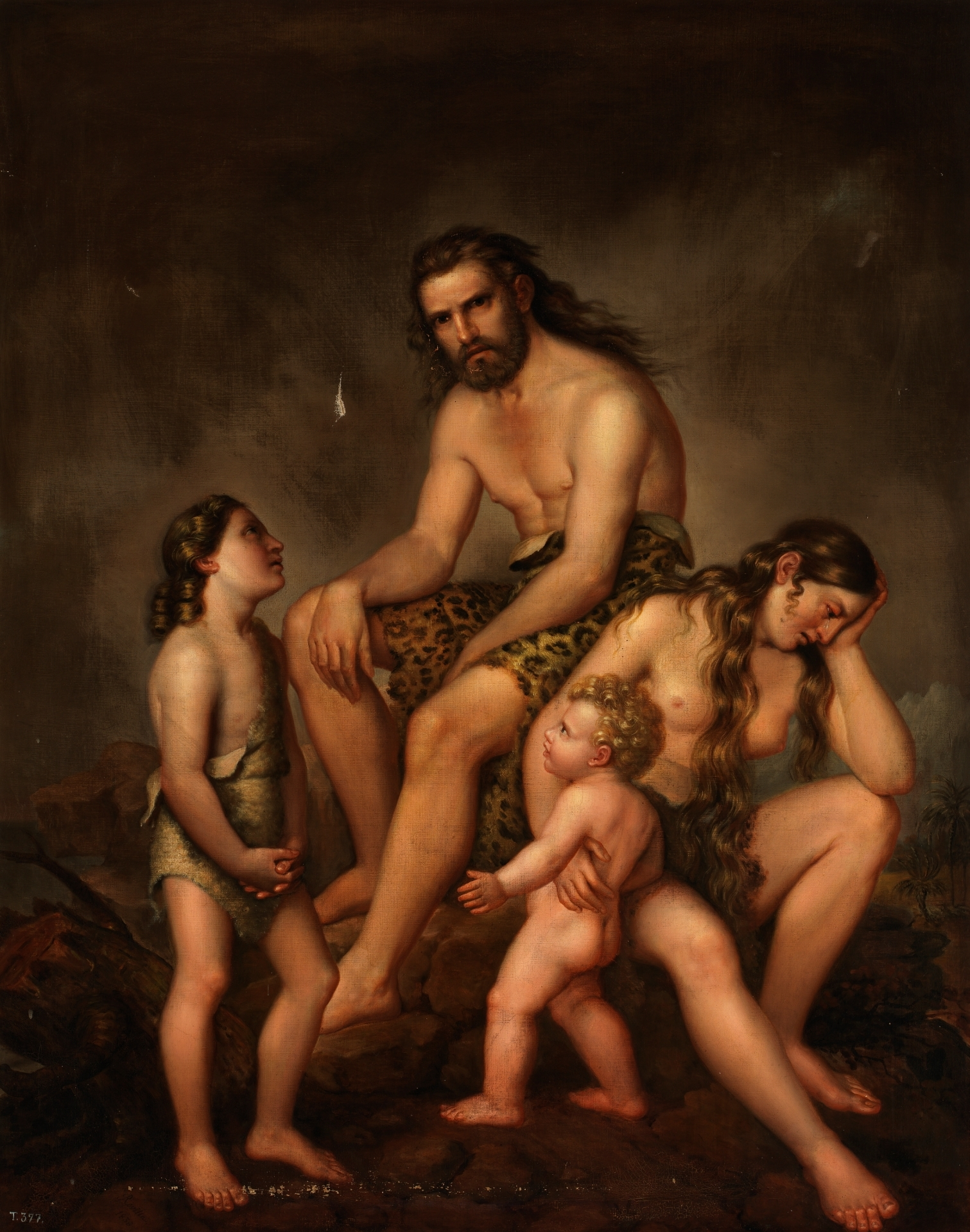
Cain and his family (José de la Revilla, 1838).

== Twin sister of Cain ==
The twin sister of Cain was the oldest daughter of Adam and Eve—the first woman to be born naturally. Different traditions give her different names, such as Aclima, Kalmana, Lusia, Cainan, Luluwa, or Âwân. (Note: Aclima was considered Cain's twin in some traditions, and the Book of Jubilees tells us that Cain was born 64–70 A.M., while Âwân was born 78–84 A.M. This may indicate Aclima and Âwân were two separate figures.)

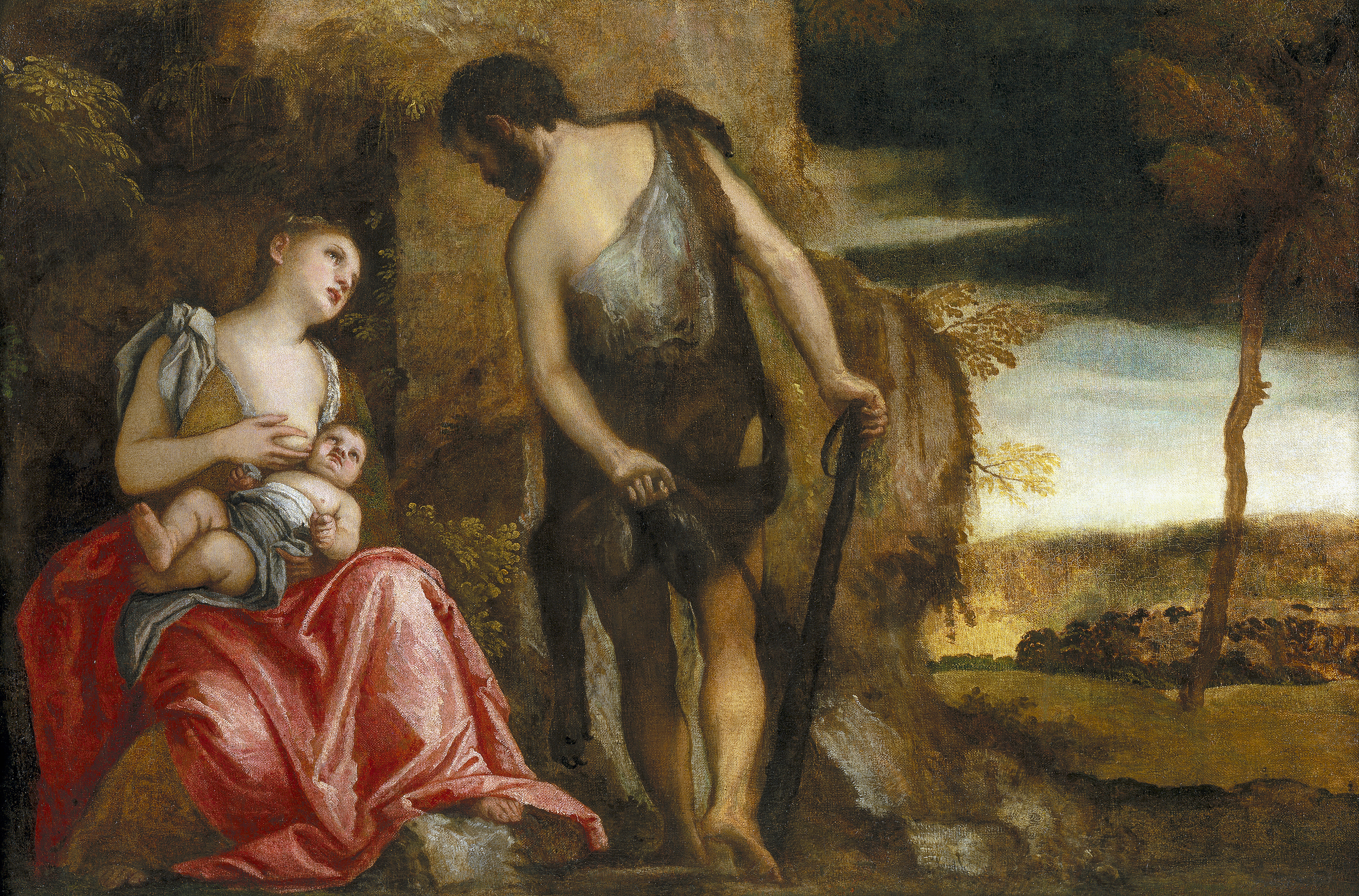
The homeless Cain and his family wandering (Paolo Veronese, 1583).

In Muslim tradition, Cain was born with a twin sister named Aclima, and Abel with a twin sister named Azura. Adam wished Cain to marry Abel's twin sister (Azura) and Abel to marry Cain's (Aclima). Cain did not consent to this arrangement, and Adam proposed to refer the question to God by means of a sacrifice. God rejected Cain's sacrifice to signify his disapproval of his marriage to his twin sister Aclima, and Cain slew his brother in a fit of jealousy.

In another Muslim tradition, Cain's twin sister was named Lusia, while Aclima was Abel's twin sister.

In different sources, this name appears as Aclimah, Aclimia, Aclimiah, Klimia. In the Cave of Treasures she is called Qelima.

Some sources in the Eastern Orthodox traditions give Cain's twin sister the name Calmana, Calmanna, Azrun, or Luluwa Azura.

In the Jewish work Seder Hadorot, Cain's twin sister is called Kalmana, and Abel's twin sister called Balbira.

Cain's sister is named Kalmana in the Apocalypse of Pseudo-Methodius (first Greek redaction) II.1., and Calmana in the Golden Legend. The poet Petrus Riga (1140–1209) included Calmana in his famous poem Aurora, and this could have been a source for her appearance in Peter Comestor's Historia Scholastica. Comestor's Biblical narrative text then served as the standard textbook for Biblical education for centuries.

In an Armenian work republished in 1966, Cain's twin sister was named Cainan.

In the 6th-century apocryphal work Conflict of Adam and Eve with Satan, Cain's wife and twin is named Luluwa.

According to the Book of Jubilees, Âwân (also Awan, Avan or Aven, from Hebrew אָוֶן aven "vice", "iniquity", "potency") was the wife and sister of Cain and the daughter of Adam and Eve.

== Twin sister of Abel ==
Azura (also Âzûra, (Note: "Azura" was considered Abel's twin in some traditions, and the Book of Jubilees tells us that Abel was born 71–77 A.M., while "Âzûra" in the Book of Jubilees (who was claimed to be Seth's wife), was born 134–140 A.M. This may indicate Azura and Âzûra were two separate figures.) Aclima, or Balbira) was the daughter of Adam and Eve, the twin of Abel, and both the wife and sister of Seth, as described in chapter 4 of the Book of Jubilees.

In Muslim tradition, Abel's twin sister was named Azura or Aclima.

Some sources in the Eastern Orthodox traditions give the name Azura to Cain's twin sister.

In another Muslim tradition, Aclima was Abel's twin sister, while Cain's twin sister was named Lusia.

In the Jewish work Seder Hadorot, Abel's twin sister is called Balbira.

Source	Name of Cain's twin sister	Name of Abel's twin sister	Notes
Book of Jubilees	Âwân (Awan, Avan)	–	Jubilees identifies Âwân as Cain's sister and wife and Azura (Âzûra) as the sister and wife of Seth; it does not explicitly name a twin sister for Abel.
Seder Hadorot	Kalmana	Balbira	Medieval Jewish chronographic tradition.
Islamic tradition	Aclima	Azura	Cain wishes to marry Aclima rather than Azura; Adam proposes a sacrifice, God rejects Cain's offering, and Cain kills Abel.
Apocrypha Arabica	Lusia	Aclima	Variant assignment in Islamic tradition.
Conflict of Adam and Eve with Satan	Luluwa	–	Luluwa is named as Cain's sister and wife; Abel's twin sister is not named.
Apocalypse of Pseudo-Methodius	Kalmana	–	First Greek redaction; Abel's twin sister is not named.
Golden Legend	Calmana	–	Medieval Western Christian tradition drawing on earlier sources.
Eastern Orthodox traditions	Calmana / Azrun / Azura	–	Names and assignments vary across sources; Abel's twin sister is not consistently identified.
Armenian Adam literature	Cainan	–	Cain's twin sister is named Cainan; Cain's marriage is not discussed.

== See also ==
- List of names for the biblical nameless
- Incest in the Bible
