= Seth =

Third son of Adam and Eve

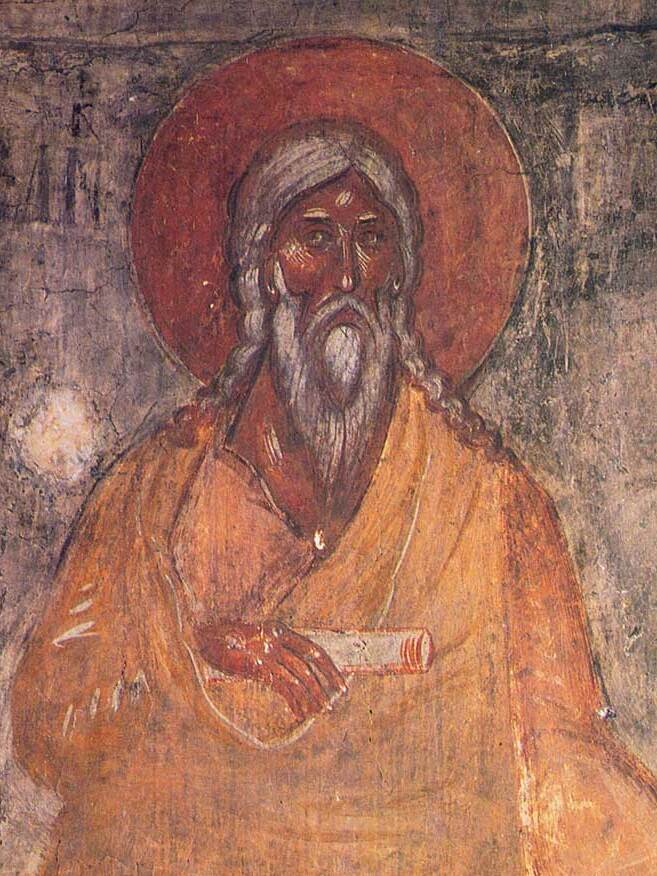
- Detail from fresco by Theophanes the Greek, 1378
- Spouse: unnamed woman (Note: Azura, according to deuterocanonical accounts)
- Children: Enos
- Parents: Adam (father); Eve (mother)
- Relatives: Abel (brother); Cain (brother)

Seth (Note: Biblical Hebrew: שֵׁת, romanized: Šēṯ, lit. 'placed' or 'appointed'; Arabic: شِيْث, romanized: Šīṯ, IPA: [ˈʃiːθ]; Greek: Σήθ, romanized: Sḗth) is the third son of Adam and Eve in the Abrahamic religions. The Hebrew Bible names two of his siblings as Cain and Abel. According to Genesis 4:25, Seth was born after the event of Cain's murder of Abel, and Eve believed that God had appointed him as a replacement for Abel.

== Hebrew Bible information ==
In Genesis (Bereshit), the first book of the Hebrew Bible (Tanakh), Seth was born to Eve when Adam was 130 years old, according to Judaism’s authoritative Masoretic Text (his age appears as 230 years in the Koine Greek Septuagint) — "a son in his likeness and image". Genesis 5:4–5 mentions that Adam fathered "other sons and daughters" before his death, when he was 930 years old. According to the Hebrew Bible, Seth died at the age of 912 (i.e., 14 years before Noah's birth). Their collective genealogy is repeated in 1 Chronicles 1:1–4.

== Jewish tradition ==
Seth figures in the biblical texts of the Life of Adam and Eve (the Apocalypse of Moses). It recounts the lives of Adam and Eve from after their expulsion from the Garden of Eden to their deaths. While the surviving versions were composed from the early third to the fifth century, the literary units in the work are considered older and predominantly Jewish in origin. There is wide agreement that the original was composed in a Semitic language in the first century AD/CE. In the Greek versions, Seth and Eve travelled to the doors of the Garden to beg for some oil of the Tree of Mercy (i.e. the Tree of Life). On the way, Seth was attacked and bitten by a wild beast, which went away when Seth ordered it. Michael refused to give them the oil at that time, but promised to give it at the end of time, when all flesh will be raised, the delights of paradise will be given to the holy people, and God will be in their midst. On their return, Adam said to Eve: "What hast thou done? Thou hast brought upon us great wrath which is death." (chapters 5–14) Later, only Seth could witness Adam's taking up in a divine chariot at his funeral, which deposited him in the Garden of Eden.

Genesis refers to Seth as the ancestor of Noah and hence the father of all humankind, all other humans having perished in the Great Flood. It is said that late in life, Adam gave Seth secret teachings that would become the Kabbalah. The Zohar refers to Seth as "ancestor of all the generations of the Egyptians or Tsetsaudim" (Hebrew: righteous ones). According to Seder Olam Rabbah, based on Jewish reckoning, he was born in 2130 BC AM. According to Aggadah, he had 2 sons and many wives. According to the Seder Olam Rabbah, he died in 1042 AM.

== Josephus ==
In the Antiquities of the Jews, Josephus refers to Seth as virtuous and of excellent character, and reports that his descendants invented the wisdom of the heavenly bodies, and built the "pillars of the sons of Seth", two pillars inscribed with many scientific discoveries and inventions, notably in astronomy. They were built by Seth's descendants based on Adam's prediction that the world would be destroyed at one time by fire and another time by global flood, in order to protect the discoveries and be remembered after the destruction. One was composed of brick, and the other of stone, so that if the pillar of brick should be destroyed, the pillar of stone would remain, both reporting the ancient discoveries, and informing humankind that a pillar of brick was also erected. Josephus reports that the pillar of stone remained in the land of Siriad in his day.

William Whiston, a 17/18th-century translator of the Antiquities, stated in a footnote that he believed Josephus mistook Seth for Sesostris, king of Egypt, the erector of the pillar in Siriad (being a contemporary name for the territories in which Sirius was venerated, i.e. Egypt). He stated that there was no way for any pillars of Seth to survive the deluge, because the deluge buried all such pillars and edifices far underground in the sediment of its waters. The perennialist writer Nigel Jackson identifies the land of Siriad in Josephus' account with Syria, citing related Mandaean legends regarding the "Oriental Land of Shyr" in connection with the visionary mytho-geography of the prophetic traditions surrounding Seth.

== Christianity ==
Saint Seth
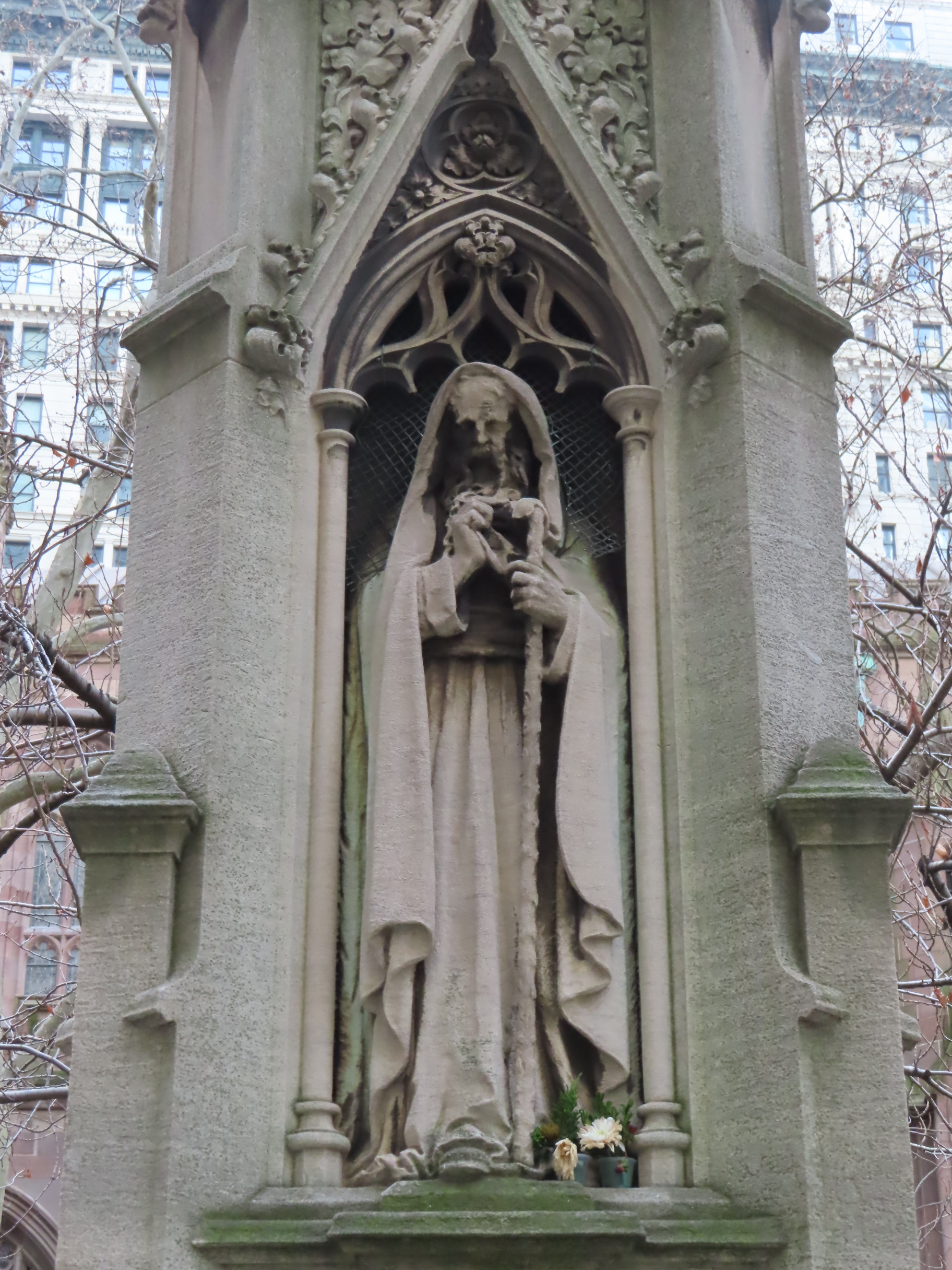
- Sculpture of Seth on the Astor Cross in Trinity Church

Patriarch
- Born: c. 130 AM
- Died: c. 1042 AM
- Venerated in: Catholic Church; Eastern Orthodox Church; Oriental Orthodox Churches
- Feast: 31 December (Catholic Church); Sunday of the Holy Forefathers (Eastern Orthodox Church)

The second-century BC Book of Jubilees, regarded as noncanonical except in the Oriental Orthodox Churches, also dates his birth to 130 after creation (AM). According to it, in 231 AM Seth married his sister, Azura, who was four years younger than he was. In the year 235 AM, Azura gave birth to Enos.

Seth is commemorated as one of the Holy Forefathers in the Calendar of Saints of the Armenian Apostolic Church, along with Adam, Abel, and others, with a feast day on July 26. He is also included in the Genealogy of Jesus, according to Luke 3:23–38.

The Sethians were a Christian Gnostic sect who may date their existence to before Christianity. Their thinking, although predominantly Judaic in foundation, was arguably strongly influenced by Platonism. Sethians were named for their veneration of Seth, depicted in their creation myths as a divine incarnation; consequently, the offspring or 'posterity' of Seth are held to comprise a superior elect within human society.

== Islam ==
Prophet Šheeṯh Alayhi as-Salam
- شِيث; Seth
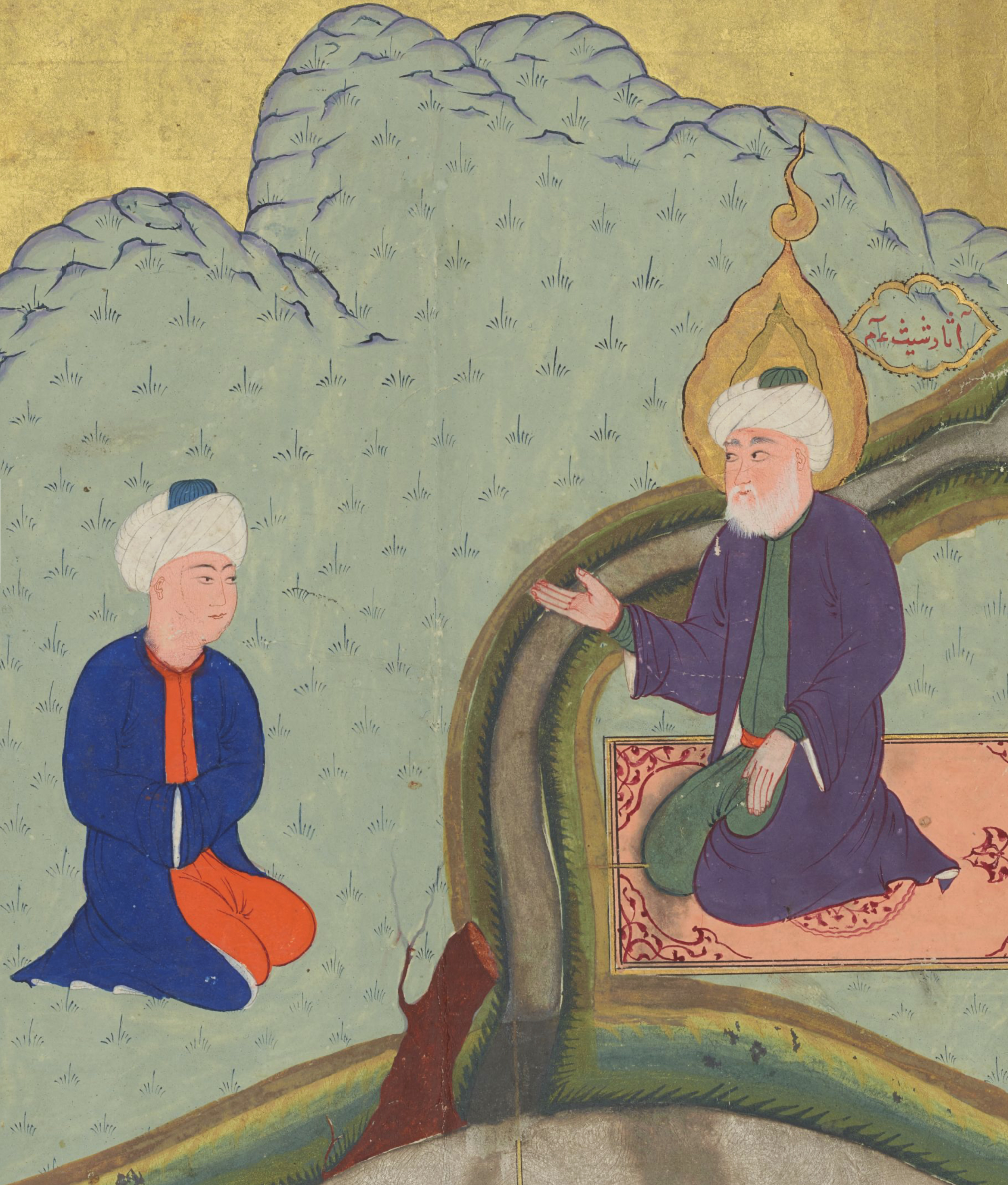
- Sheth (right) teaching his son Anush

Prophet of Islam
- Preceded by: Adam
- Succeeded by: Idris

Personal life
- Born: Sheeth ibn Adam
- Children: Anush
- Parents: Adam (father); Hawwa (mother)
- Known for: Being the third son of Adam; Being the second prophet in Islam
- Relations: Qabil (brother), Habil (brother)

Religious life
- Religion: Islam

The Quran makes no mention of Šheeṯh ibn Ādam (Arabic: شِيث ٱبْن آدم, romanized: Shith ibn adm). He is respected within Islamic traditions as the third and righteous son of Adam and Eve and seen as the gift bestowed on Adam after the death of Abel. The Sunni scholar and historian ibn Kathir in his tarikh (book of history), Al-Bidāya wa-n-nihāya (البداية والنهاية), records that Seth, a prophet like his father Adam, transfers God's Law to mankind after the death of Adam, and places him among the exalted antediluvian patriarchs of the Generations of Adam. Some sources say that Seth was the receiver of scriptures. These scriptures are said to be the "first scriptures" mentioned in the Quran 87:18. Medieval historian and exegete al-Tabari and other scholars say that Seth buried Adam and the secret texts in the tomb of Adam, i.e., the "Cave of Treasures".

Islamic literature holds that Seth was born when Adam was past 100 and that Adam appointed Seth as guide to his people. The 11th-century Syrian historian and translator Al-Mubashshir ibn Fātik recorded the maxims and aphorisms of the ancient philosophers in his book Kitāb mukhtār al-ḥikam wa-maḥāsin al-kalim and included a chapter on Seth. Within Islamic tradition Seth holds wisdom of several kinds; knowledge of time, prophecy of the future Great Flood, and inspiration on the methods of night prayer. Islam, Judaism and Christianity trace the genealogy of mankind back to Seth since Abel left no heirs and Cain's heirs, according to tradition, were destroyed by the Great Flood. Many traditional Islamic crafts are traced back to Seth, such as the making of horn combs. Seth also plays a role in Sufism, and Ibn Arabi includes a chapter in his Bezels of Wisdom on Seth, entitled "The Wisdom of Expiration in the Word of Seth".

Some traditions locate Seth's tomb in the village of al-Nabi Shayth (lit. "The Prophet Seth") in the mountains above the Beqaa Valley in Lebanon, where there is a mosque named after him. This tomb was described by the 12th-century geographer Ibn Jubayr. A rival tradition, mentioned by later medieval Arab geographers from the 13th century on, placed the tomb of Nabi Shith ("Prophet Seth") in the Palestinian village of Bashshit, southwest of Ramla village. According to the Palestine Exploration Fund, Bashshit means Beit Shith, i.e. "House of Seth". The village was depopulated with the establishment of the State of Israel in 1948, but the three-domed structure said to be Seth's tomb survives in the Israeli moshav Aseret built on the site. Another tomb in the city of Balkh, Afghanistan has been identified as the burial site of Seth.

Local Muslims in Ayodhya, Uttar Pradesh in India believe a 12-foot-long (3.7 m) grave in Hazrat Shees Jinnati Mosque to be the maqam of Hazrat Shees or the Prophet Seth. This belief is mentioned in a 16th-century Mughal document Ain-i-Akbari and is also mentioned in the work India of Aurangzeb of Jadunath Sarkar.

== Mandaeism ==
According to the Mandaean scriptures, including the Qulasta, the Mandaean Book of John and Genzā Rabbā, Seth is cognate with the angelic soteriological figure Shitil (Classical Mandaic: ࡔࡉࡕࡉࡋ, romanized: Šitil), a son of Adam Kadmaya who taught John the Baptist with his brothers Anush (Enosh) and Hibil (Abel). He is variously spoken of as a son of Adam, a brother or son of Hibil, and the brother or father of Anush. Shitil is one of the revealers of Mandaeism and a prophet, identified as the biblical Seth.

== Yazidism ==
In Yazidism, Seth is known as Shehid ibn Jerr.

According to Yazidi oral literature, Adam and Eve each deposited their seeds into separate jars. While Eve's seed developed into insects, Adam's seed gave birth to Shehid ibn Jerr, the ancestor of the Yazidis. Yazidis thus believe that they have been created separately and differently from all other human beings (Kreyenbroek 2005 : 31).

== Family tree ==
Adam (Note: Genesis 4:1)	Eve
Cain	Abel (Note: Genesis 4:2)	Seth (Note: Genesis 4:25; 5:3)
Enoch (Note: Genesis 4:17)	Enos (Note: Genesis 4:26; 5:6–7)
Irad (Note: Genesis 4:18)	Kenan (Note: Genesis 5:9–10)
Mehujael	Mahalalel (Note: Genesis 5:12–13)
Methushael	Jared (Note: Genesis 5:15–16)
Adah (Note: Genesis 4:19)	Lamech	Zillah	Enoch (Note: Genesis 5:18–19)
Jabal (Note: Genesis 4:20)	Jubal (Note: Genesis 4:21)	Tubal-Cain (Note: Genesis 4:22)	Naamah	Methuselah (Note: Genesis 5:21–22)
Lamech (Note: Genesis 5:25–26)
Noah (Note: Genesis 5:28–30)
Shem (Note: Genesis 5:32)	Ham	Japheth

== Shrines ==
=== Iraq ===
On July 26, 2014, forces of the Islamic State of Iraq and the Levant (ISIL) blew up the Nabi Shiyt (Prophet Seth) shrine in Mosul, Iraq.

Sami al-Massoudi, the deputy head of the Shiite Endowment Office overseeing holy sites, confirmed that destruction. He added that ISIL took some of the artifacts to an unknown location.

The mosque was rebuilt in 2022.

=== Lebanon ===
There is a village named after him in Lebanon, that is al-Nabi Shayth or al-Nabi Sheeth (meaning "The Prophet Seth"), which is also considered to contain his shrine.

=== Israel ===
The tomb of Bashshit is believed to be the grave of Seth. The tomb now sits in Aseret.

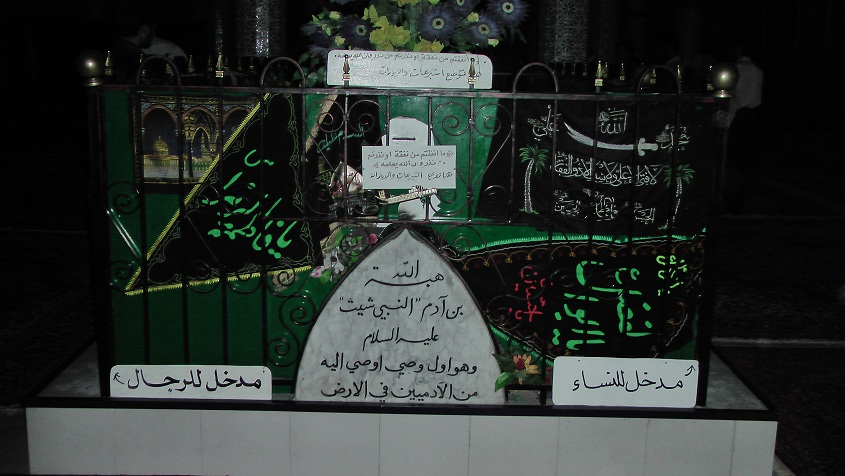
The purported grave of Seth in a village of the same name in the Levant

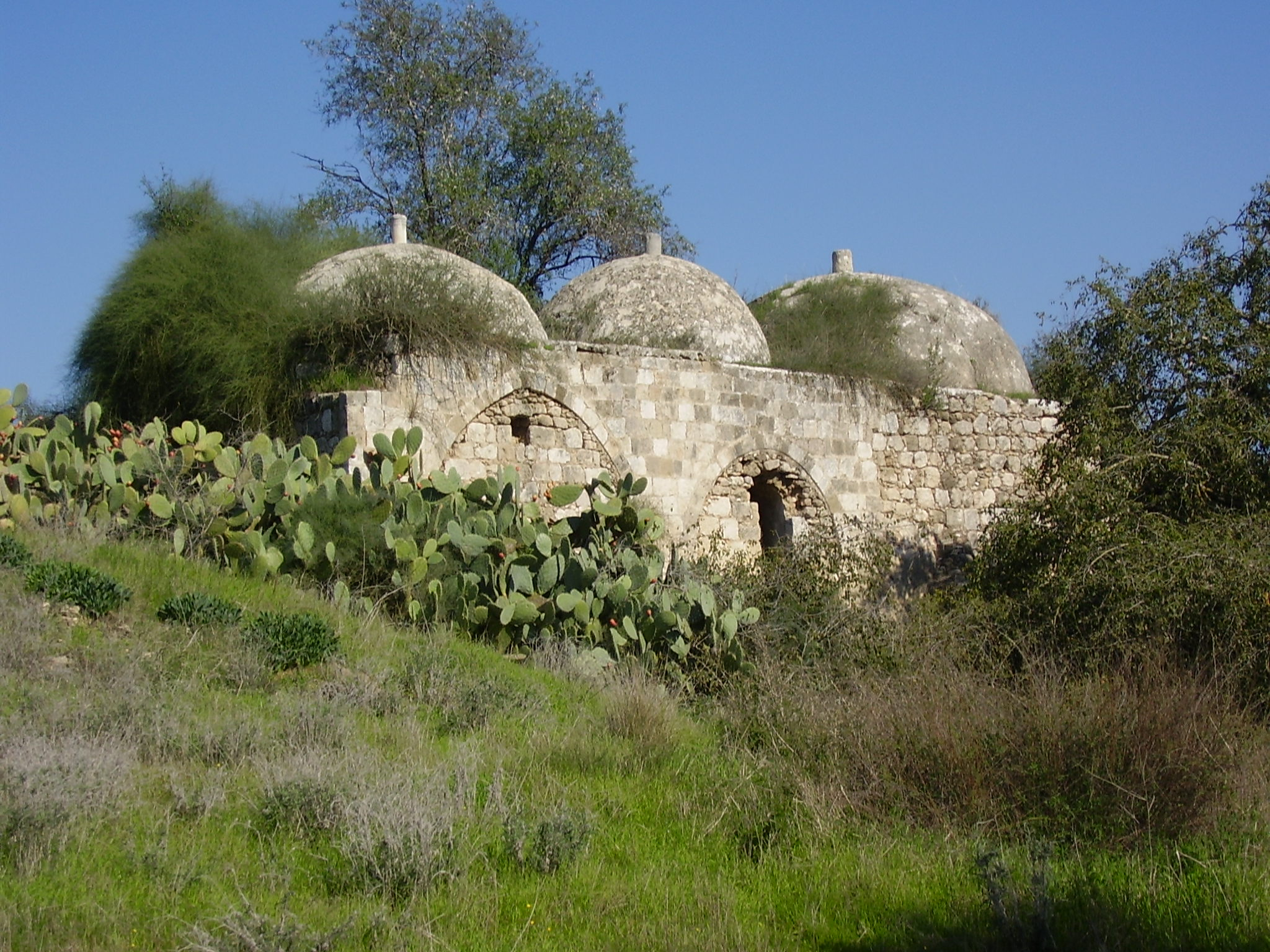
The purported grave of Seth in Bashshit, modern-day Israel

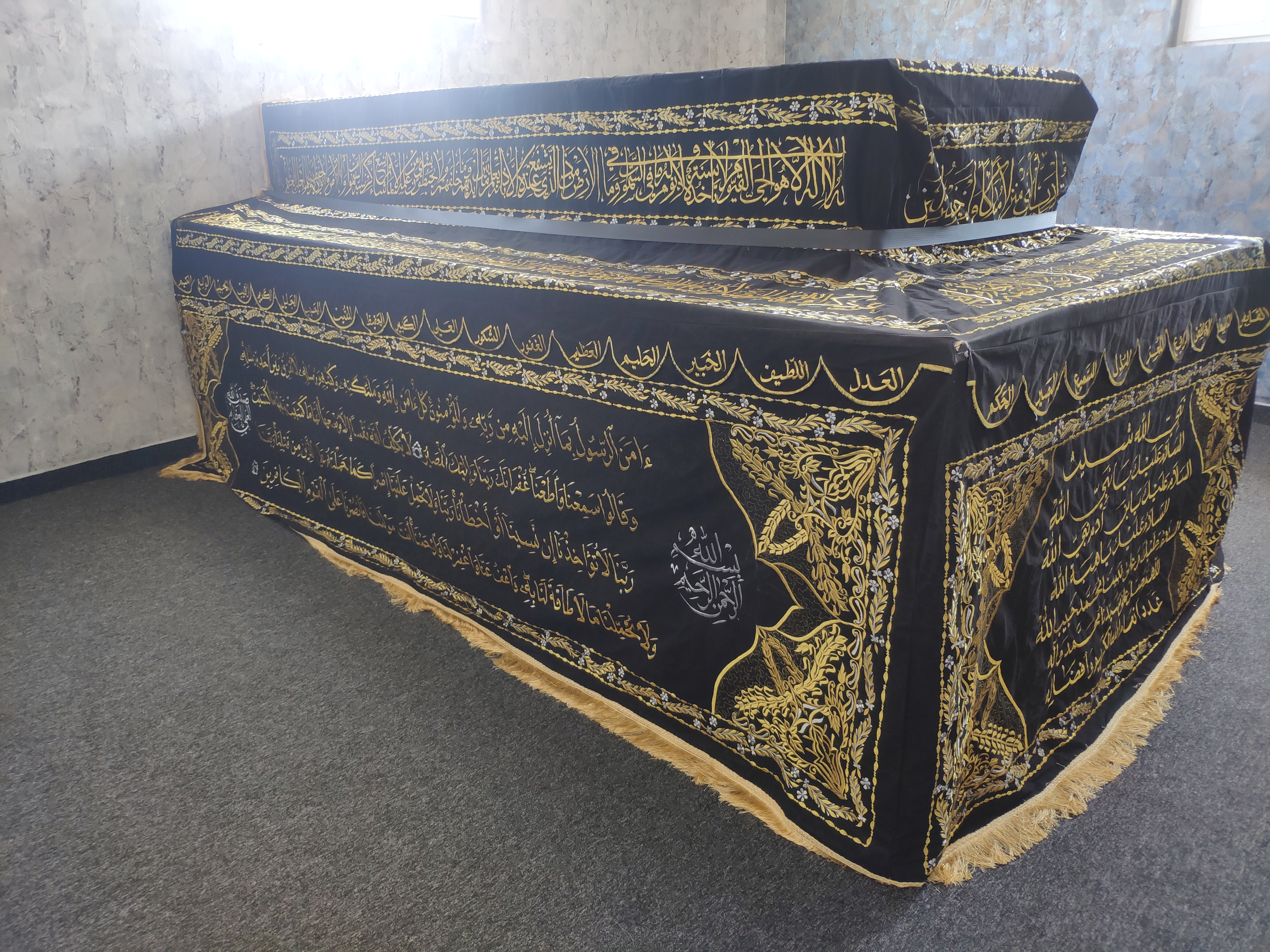
The purported grave of Seth in Mosul, Iraq

== See also ==
- Set (deity) or Seth, an Egyptian deity
- Suteans

== Bibliography ==
- A. F. J. Klijn, Seth in Jewish, Christian and Gnostic Literature. Supplements to Novum Testamentum 46. Leiden: E. J. Brill, 1977 .
