= Adam in Islam =

First man and Prophet in Islam

Prophet Ādam
- آدم
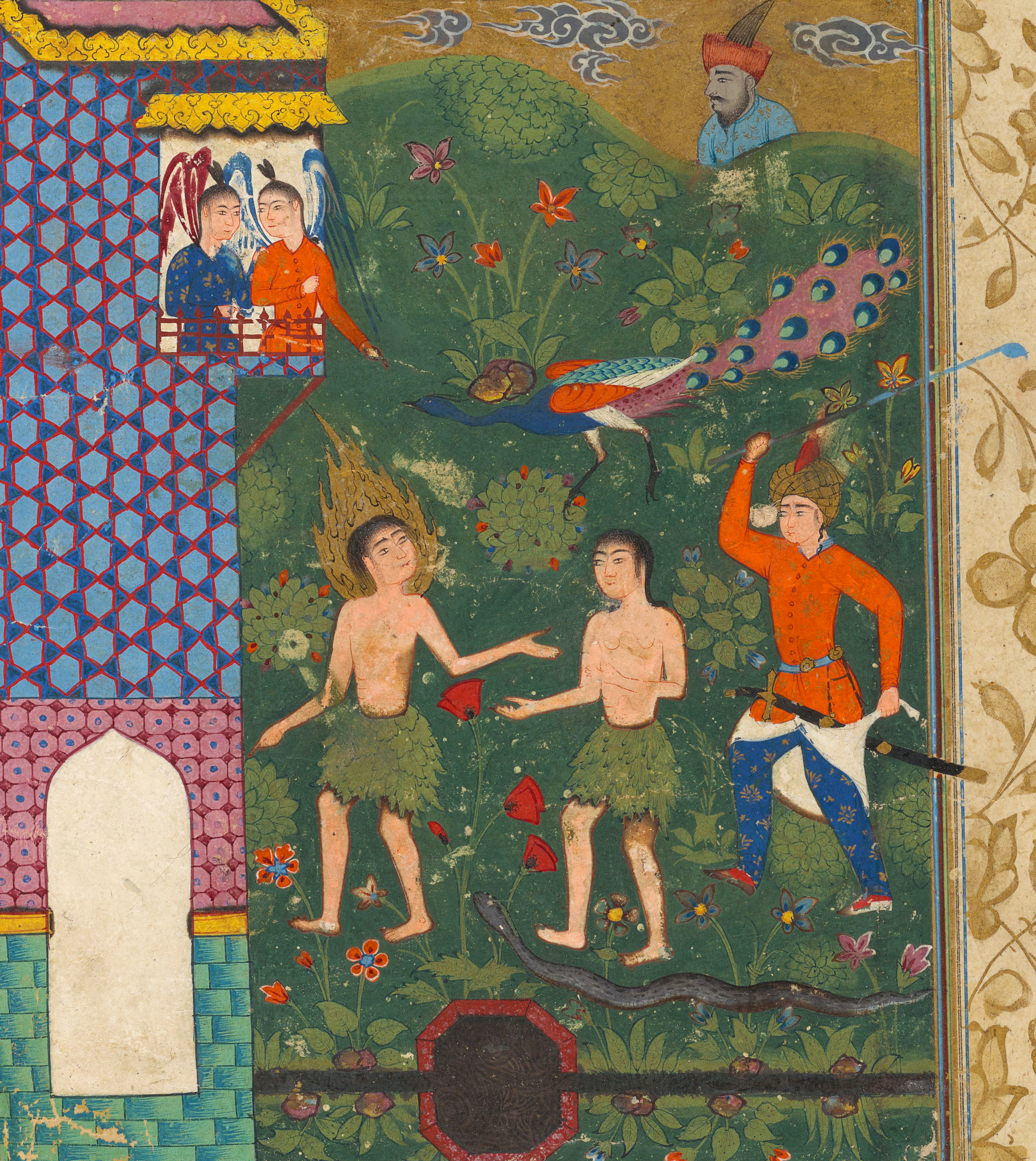
- Adam and Hawwa are nakedly expelled from Paradise, Qisas al-Anbiya, Persian manuscript, 1577

Prophet of Islam
- Preceded by: Position established
- Succeeded by: Sheth

Personal life
- Spouse: Ḥawwāʾ
- Children: Qābīl and Hābīl, Sheth, ʿAnāq
- Known for: First human being; First settler on Earth; Father of humanity; First Muslim; Khalifa

Religious life
- Religion: Islam

Adam (Arabic: آدم, romanized: ʾĀdam), in Islamic theology, is believed to have been the first human being on Earth and the first prophet of Islam. Adam's role as the father of the human race is looked upon by Muslims with reverence. Muslims refer to his wife, Ḥawwāʾ(Eve), as the "mother of mankind". Muslims see Adam as the first Muslim, as the Quran states that all the Prophets preached the same faith of Islam.

According to Islamic belief, Adam was created from the material of the earth and brought to life by God. God placed Adam in a paradisical Garden. After Adam sinned by eating from the forbidden tree (Tree of Immortality) after God forbade him from doing so, paradise was declined to him and he was sent down to live on Earth. The Qiṣaṣ al-Anbiyāʾ adds that Adam and Hawwa, when cast out of paradise, were cast down far apart and eventually met each other at Mount Arafat. Mankind would have learned planting, harvesting, baking, repenting from Adam.

The Quranic story of Adam is seen as both literal as well as an allegory for human relationship towards God. Islam does not necessarily adhere to young Earth creationism, and most Muslims believe that life on Earth predates Adam. Adam does not feature as a prophet or a male human being only, but also encapsulates the idea of an ideal human archetype.

== Quranic narrative ==
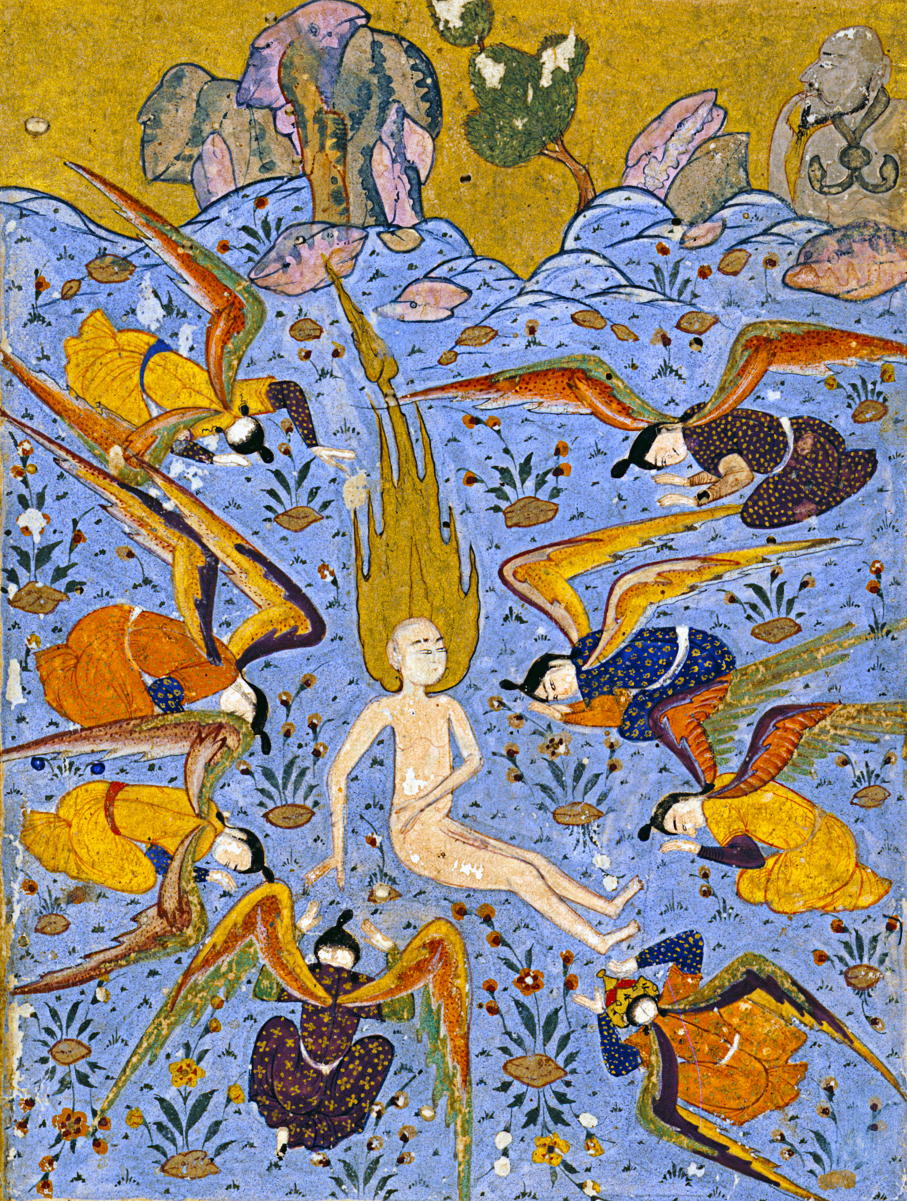
All angels prostrate before Adam, except Iblis (top-right corner).

The Quran describes Adam in two different scenarios. In the first, Adam is created in heaven and the angels are commanded to prostrate themselves before him by God. In the second scenario, Adam dwells in a paradisical Garden with his wife identified as Ḥawwāʾ in Islamic tradition. The Quran usually mentions God creating Adam from "earth" or "clay" (ṭīn, although one verse suggests "dust" or "dirt" (turāb)) and breathing His own spirit into him, then depicts the angels as doubting the creation of Adam;^{[Quran 2:30]}

When your Lord said to the angels, "I am indeed going to set a viceroy on the earth," they said, "Will You set in it someone who will cause corruption in it and shed blood, while we celebrate Your praise and proclaim Your sanctity?" He said, "Indeed, I know what you do not know."

The Quranic narrative continues that God "taught Adam the Names, all of them," and that Adam presented the names to the angels,^{[Quran 2:31]} God then commands the angels to bow down to Adam, but Iblis refuses, saying that he is better than Adam because he was created from fire and Adam from clay.

The creation of Eve is not specified in the Quran, but several verses imply the traditional Genesis account by stating "created you [humanity] from a single soul, and created its mate from it".^{[Quran 4:1]} In the Quran, God then tells Adam and his unnamed wife to live in paradise but not to approach a certain tree, which Satan calls the "tree of immortality". In the story of the Garden, God tells Adam and Ḥawwāʾ that they are not allowed to consume the fruit of the "tree of immortality" (which Islamic tradition identifies with wheat). By promising immortality and "a kingdom that never decays", the Iblis (later equated with the Arabic: شَيْطَان, romanized: šayṭān) convinced them to taste it nonetheless: "He said, "Your Lord has forbidden this tree to you only to prevent you from becoming angels or immortals."" (7:21) Whereupon Adam and his wife are sent to earth, condemned to "live and die", but God is willing to forgive them.

== Theological and mystical interpretations ==
Since God has forgiven Adam's transgression, humans are not viewed as inherently sinful or in need of redemption. Instead, Adam (or humanity) is viewed as being created from a relationship to God through learning and development. The story of Adam's creation evokes the idea of Adam as the "Primordial Man" to whom the angels need to prostrate themselves as a sign of respect. In a comment on Tafsir al-Baydawi, Gibril Haddad explains "he is also an archetype for the Attributes of Allah Most High such as His life, knowledge and power, although an incomplete one." All angels bowed down, except Iblis (Arabic: إِبْلِيسْ, romanized: Iblīs), and he is cast down from heaven and becomes the enemy of Adam and his offspring.

Suhrawardi (c. 1145 – 1234) discusses the nature of human's soul as a mixture between Adam and Hawwa; Adam referring to the heavenly attributes and Hawwa to earthly animalistic passion. Through a mixture of both, the human soul (Arabic: نَفْس, romanized: nafs, lit. 'self') is fashioned and becomes a personal animal soul. He based his anthropology on Quranic verses such as "He who has created you [all] out of one living entity, and out of it brought into being its mate, so that man might incline [with love] towards the woman" (7:189).

According to Tafsir al-Baydawi (d.1319), Adam might stand for an original pattern for all of the spiritual and the corporeal existence or serving as a way for angels to obtain their allotted perfections by submitting to God's command to prostrate before him. Ibn Arabi explains that only Adam can comprehend all the names of God, thereby referring to the perfected heavenly Adam as a reflection of God's names. When Iblis failed to submit to God's command, he attributed injustice to the reality (Arabic: ٱلْحَقُّ, romanized: al-haqq).

=== Adam versus angels ===
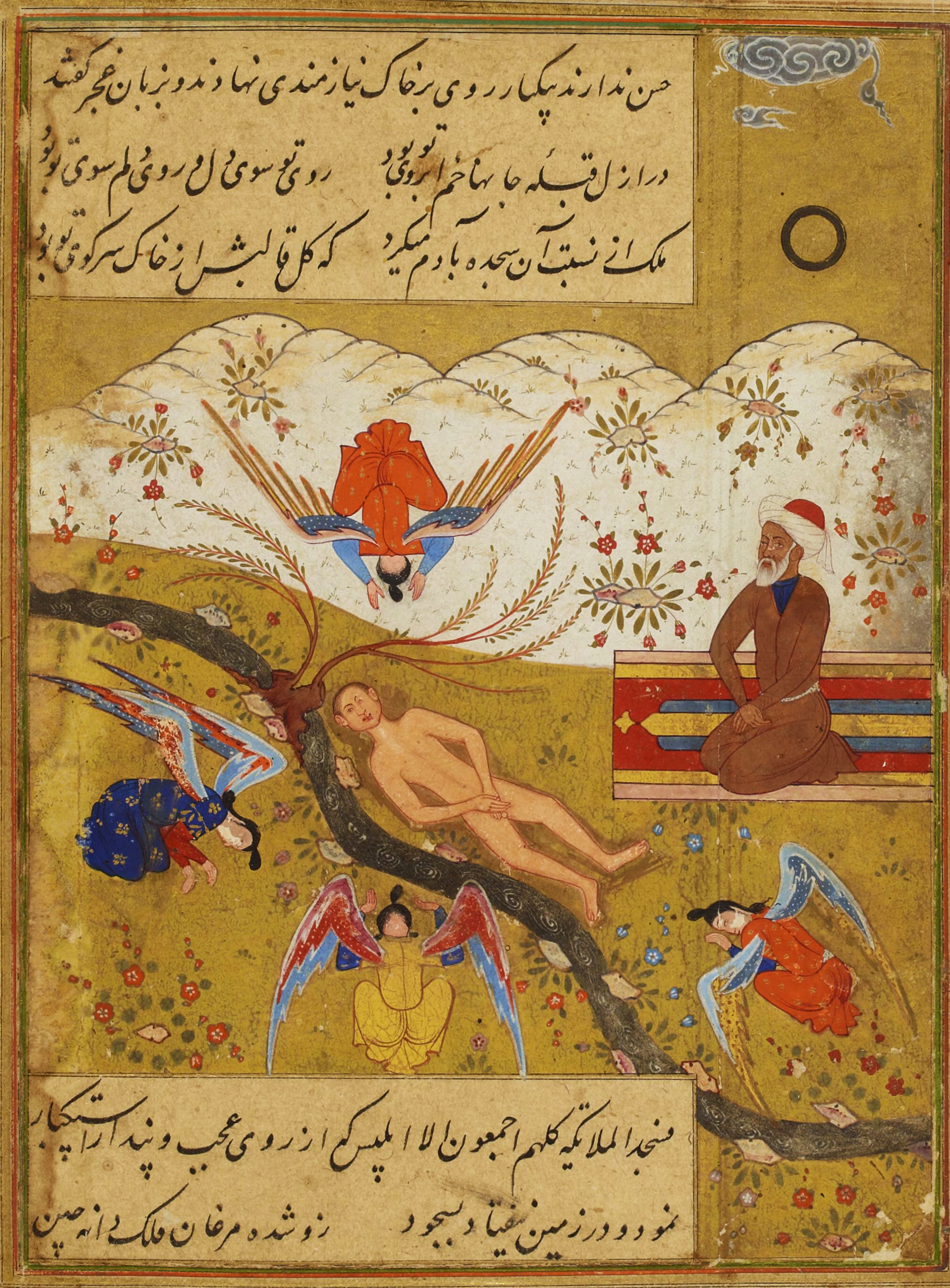
Islamic illustration of all angels except Iblis bowing to Adam from a 1575 Shiraz manuscript

The story of angels prostrating before Adam gave rise to various debates about whether humans or angels rank higher. Angels bowing down before Adam is mentioned as evidence for human superiority over the angels. Others hold that the prostration does not imply such a thing, but was merely a command or test for the angels. A position, especially found among Mu'tazilites and some Asharites, holds that angels are superior due to their lack of urges and desires. Maturidism generally does not regard any of these creatures is superior to the other, and that angels' and prophets' obedience derive from their virtues and insights to God's action, but not as their original purity.

In the Quranic version of Adam's fall, Satan tempted them with the promise to become immortal angels. Al-Qushayri comments on 7:20, that Adam's fall is for his wish to be like an angel, while angels' fall is because when they desired to be like human. Adam desired an angelic state of no passion and avoiding the fate of death, while Harut and Marut desired the freedom of choice and to rejoice in extravagance.

=== ‘Iṣmah ===
Muslim scholars can be divided into two groups regarding Adam's infallibility (Arabic: عِصْمَة, romanized: 'Ismah): One argues that Adam only became a prophet after he was cast out of paradise. They adhere to the doctrine that ‘iṣmah only applies to prophets after they were sent to a mission. But since there was no population to whom Adam could have been sent, he could not have been a prophet and therefore ‘iṣmah did not apply until he left paradise. These arguments are, however, rejected by those who argue that prophethood does not start with preaching God's word and instead begins at birth itself. According to the second point of view, Adam was predestined by God to eat from the forbidden tree because God planned to set Adam and his progeny on earth from the beginning and thus installed Adam's fall. In that regard, Adam would not have truly disobeyed, but acted in accordance with God's will to his best ability. For that reason, many Muslim exegetes do not regard Adam and Eve's expulsion from paradise as punishment for disobedience or a result from abused free will on their part, but as part of God's wisdom (Arabic: حكمة, romanized: hikmah) and plan for humanity to experience the full range of his attributes, his love, forgiveness, and power to his creation. By their former abode in paradise, they can hope for return during their life-time.

Some Muslim scholars view Adam as an image for his descendants: humans sin, become aware of it, repent (Arabic: توبة, romanized: tawbah), and find their way back to God. Adam embodies humanity and his fall shows humans how to act when they sin. Unlike Iblis (Satan), Adam asked for forgiveness for his transgression.

== Genealogy of Adam ==
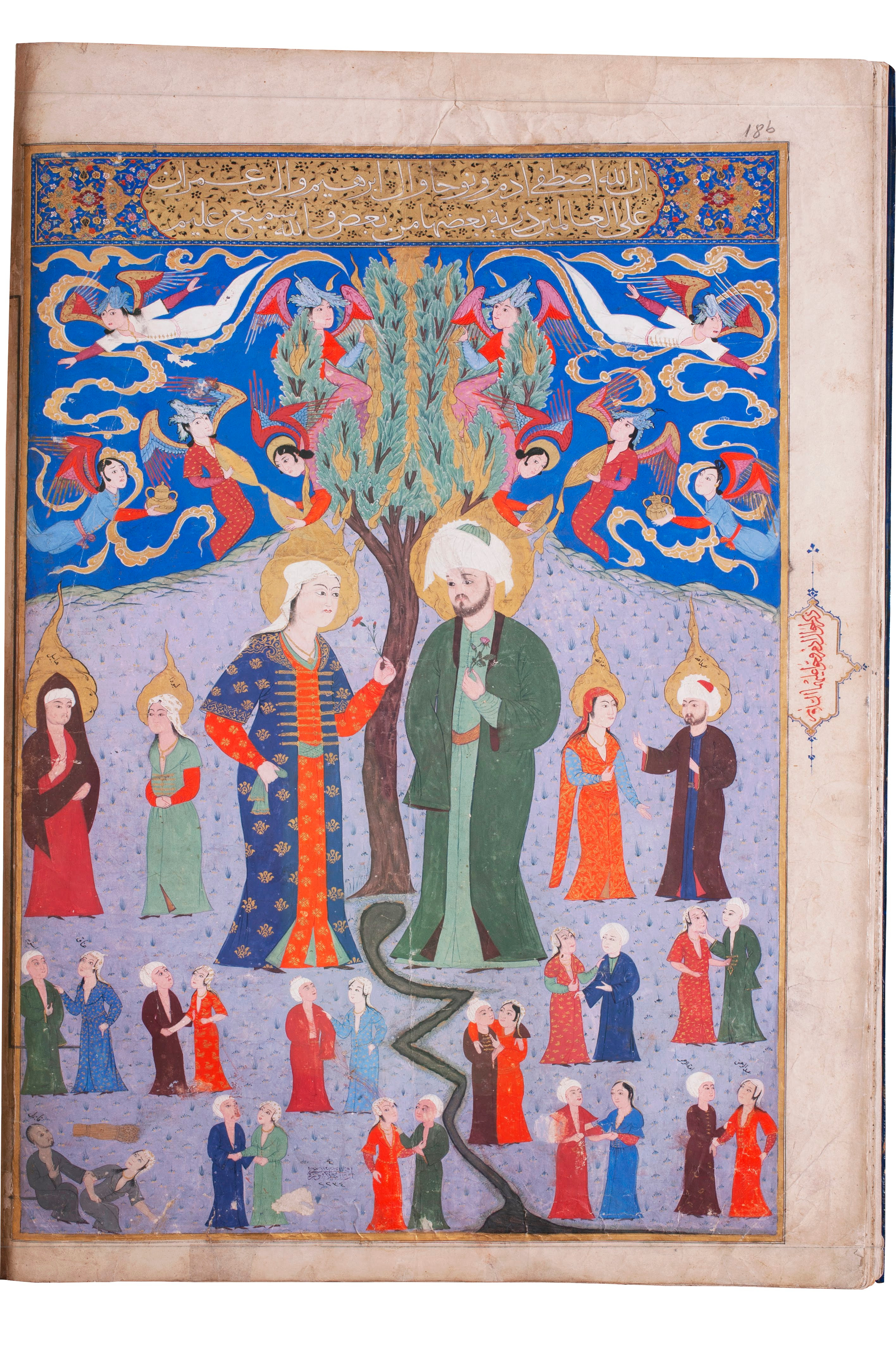
Adam and Eve with their thirteen twin children, miniature from Zubdat al-Tawarikh. As the text indicates, all of Adam's children were twins and each son had to marry the twin sister of a brother. Abel was asked by his father to wed Cain's twin sister, who happened to be the most beautiful, and thus Cain wanted to keep her. This is how the dispute started between the two brothers. Islamic artists, when illustrating the story of Adam and Eve, usually showed the couple in paradise but never placed them with their children, nor represented this version of the dispute between Cain and Abel.

Ibn Jarir at-Tabari reported that Hawwa’ bore Adam 120 sets of twins. The first of them were Qabil and his twin sister Qalima, and the last of them was ‘Abd al-Mughith and his twin sister Amat al-Mughith. Ibn Ishaq meanwhile was quoted as saying Hawwa’ bore Adam a total of 40 children, male and female, in sets of twins from 20 pregnancies. And he said: The names of some of them have come down to us, and the names of others have not."

Islamic scholar Sayyid Mumtaz Ali, while commenting on whether Adam or Eve was made first, says that "the fact that Adam was created first is nothing but childish. To begin with, we are tempted to assert that this is so because it was not acceptable to God that a woman is left without a companion for even a second. Therefore, it is for her sake that he created Adam first. But as a matter of fact, the belief that Adam was created first and then came Eve is part of the Christian and Jewish faith. This is not at all part of the Islamic creed. There is no mention in the Quran about who was created first, Adam or Eve."

== Creation myth comparison of Adam ==
Hadīths, incorporated in both tafsīr and qaṣaṣ ul-anbiyāʾ, offer detailed descriptions about the creation of Adam. Although they vary in detail, the following components are essential:

1. God orders the angels to collect dust from the earth to create Adam.
2. Dust is taken from various places, influencing Adam's descendants.
3. Mythological meaning behind the name of the first human
4. Adam lies immobile for forty years and Adam hastily tries to rise up unable to do so.
5. Adam sneezes and says al-hamdu li-allah (Arabic: ٱلْحَمْدُ لِلَّٰهِ, lit. 'All praise is for Allah')

Some of these components appear in both Jewish and Islamic traditions alike. The idea that God orders angels to collect dust from earth is, however, unique to Islam. It is only later adapted in the Chronicles of Jerahmeel. Islam usually has Azrael being successful, taking the earth despite earth's pleads not to do so. For his merciless withstanding, he earns his position as the angel of death. This further shows that life and death are intertwined. Only in one brief reference by al-Tabari, it is Iblis, not Azrael who collects dust from earth, leading to his claim to be superior.

Both Jewish and Muslim sources agree that dust for the creation of Adam's body was taken from the entire world, and often a specific sacred place. However, they differ in regards the identity of the sacred places and the meaning of the gathering of dust from the world. While Jewish tradition identifies sacred places from Israel or the altar of the Temple, Muslim sources identify the place with Mecca or the Ka'aba. According to the Muslim interpretation, dust collected from all around the earth explains the differences among humankind, such as skin-color, but insist that humanity as a whole is united and stems from the ancestry of Adam.

== Modern debates and discussions ==
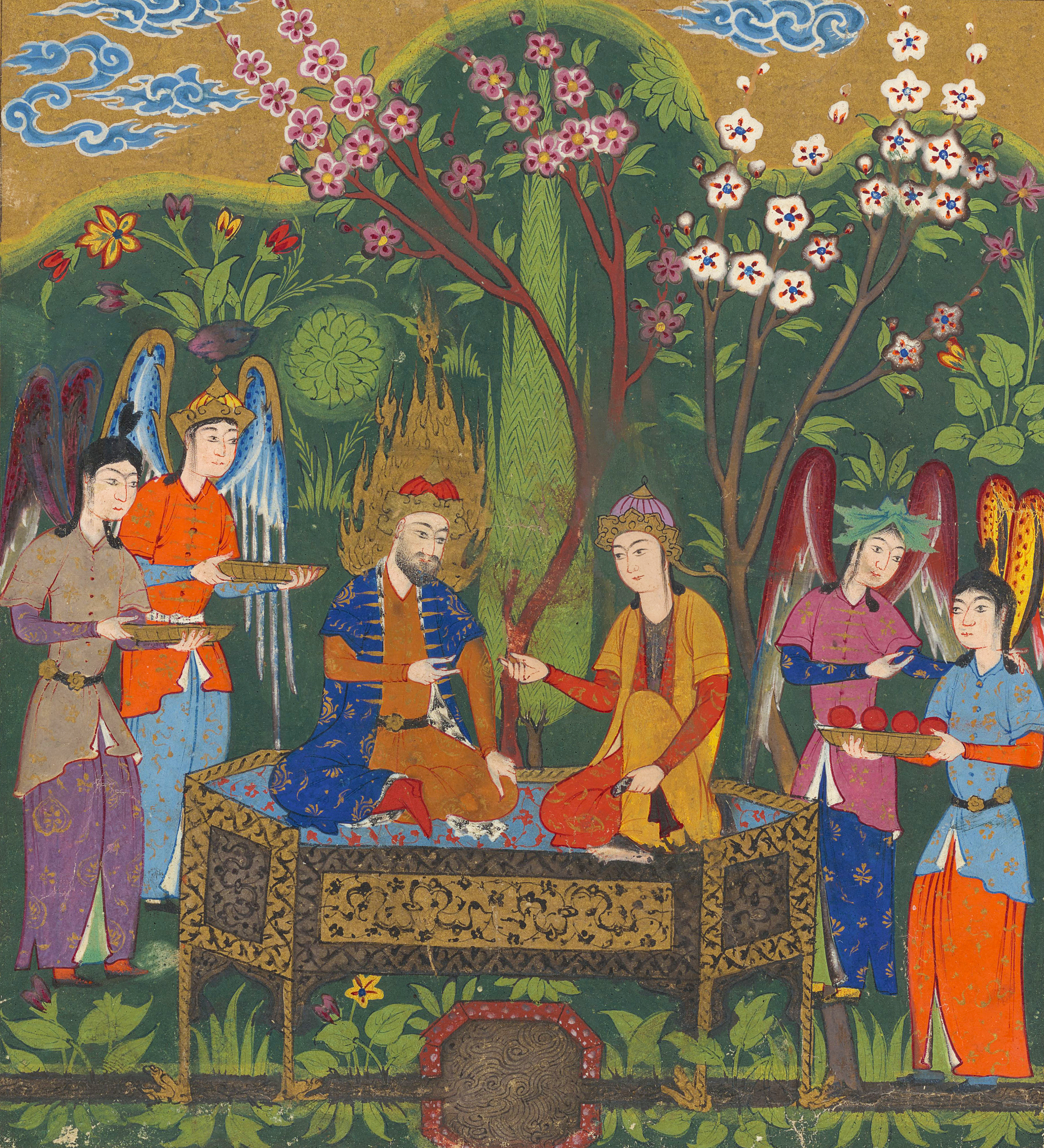
Drawing on the theological significance of Adam's relation to God he and his consort are at times depicted as rulers of the Garden in Islamic art

It is evident from the Quran that Adam was the father of contemporary humanity. The conflict between the literal reading of the story and positive scientific branches such as human evolution and paleoanthropology caused great turmoil and debate in the Islamic world, and ways of escaping from the visible and rigid understanding were sought. (Note: Some hadiths mentions Adam's resemblance, the height and the plan with which he created; "Allah the exalted and Glorius, created Adam in his image with his length of sixty cubits (30-35 m) tall.")

According to some views, God created an Adam thirty times, every 1000 years. After the downfall of each humanity, God left the world uninhabited for 50,000 years, then 50,000 inhabited, and then a new Adam was created. Unlike many Shiite scholars the majority of Sunni scholars, however, reject this opinion, but they agree that the jinn and animals have lived on earth before. According to the Majallat Al Azhar, nowhere within Islamic texts is it prescribed how long humans existed and every Muslim is free to think that is right, and that the notion of a young earth derives from biblical reports (Israʼiliyyat). Süleyman Ateş used Quranic verses to disprove creationist interpretations of the Adam narrative.

In the Persianate world and Shiite circles more broadly debates around evolution and young Earth creationism began in the 1880s and have since then led to a variety of scholarly positions on the question of life before Adam and evolution. Notable scholarly support for strict creationism comes from scholars such as Muhammad Husayn Tabataba'i and Hossein Nasr, while support for a rejection of young earth creationism and support for scientific evolution comes from scholars such as Yadollah Sahabi. There exists a broad spectrum of Shiite positions in between these two extremes from support for Lamarckism to human exceptionalism—seeing non-human life as evolved but human life as created—and Adamic exceptionalism seeing all life except Adam as evolved. Scholars championing these different positions commonly stress that none of these readings are implied by the Quran or that divergence from them is necessarily heretical.

== See also ==
- Adam Kadmon
- Adam's Peak
- Legends and the Quran
- Muhammad in Islam
- Prophets of Islam
- Stories of The Prophets

== Bibliography ==
=== Quran references ===
- Creation of Adam, the command to the angels to prostrate while Iblis' refusal being a jinn, Adam’s fall after Satan’s temptation, his repentance and guidance from God, honour and dignity granted to humanity and divine commandments: 2:30-39, 7:11-35, 17:61-70, 18:50-51, 20:115-126, 36:60-61
- God chose Adam, Noah, the family of Abraham, and the family of Imran above others of their time and Adam being among the prophets favoured and guided by God: 3:33, 19:58
- Comparison between the creation of Jesus to that of Adam: 3:59
- Adam's son Cain killing his brother Abel: 5:27–31
- Humanity's primordial covenant acknowledging God as their Lord: 7:172–173
- Humanity created from a single soul and its mate: 7:189

=== Others ===
- Reynolds, Gabriel Said (2018). The Qurʾān and the Bible: Text and Commentary. Yale University Press. ISBN 978-0-300-18132-6.
