= Cain and Abel in Islam =

Islamic view of the two sons of Adam

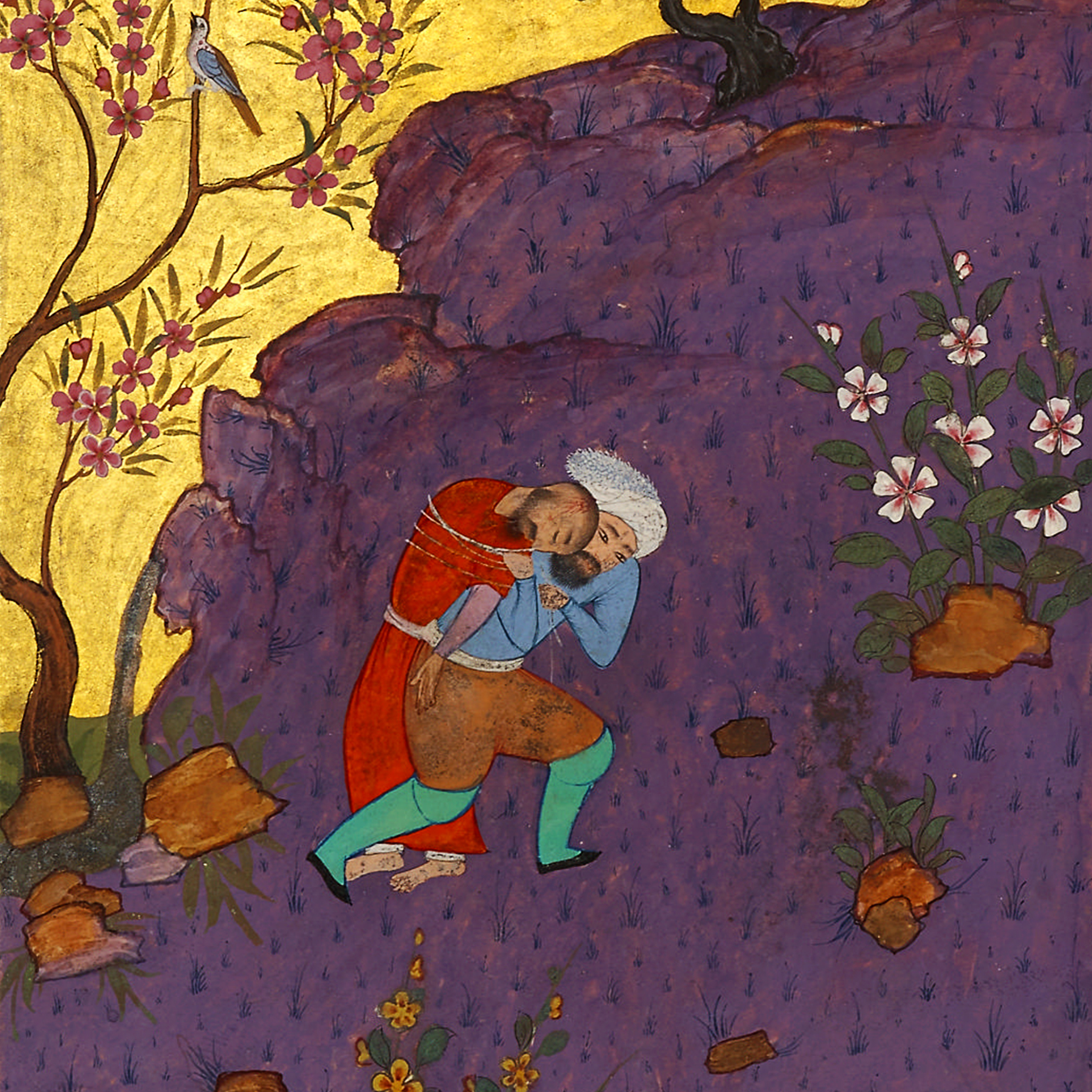
Islamic miniature of Cain carrying his murdered brother, Abel, to hide his corpse from Allah (God) from an illuminated manuscript version of Stories of the Prophets.

Qābīl (Arabic: قَابِيْل, Cain) and Hābīl (Arabic: هَابِيل, Abel) are two of the first sons of Adam and Hawaʾ (Eve) mentioned in the Quran.

The events of the story in the Quran are virtually the same as the Hebrew Bible narrative: Both the brothers were asked to offer up individual sacrifices to God; God accepted Abel's sacrifice and rejected Cain's; out of jealousy, Cain slew Abel – the first case of murder committed upon the Earth.

== In the Qur'an ==
Of Adam's first children, Cain was the elder son while Abel the younger. Each of them presented a sacrifice to God but it was accepted only from Abel, because of the latter's righteous attitude and his faith and firm belief in God. After the offering of their sacrifices, Cain, the wicked sibling, taunted Abel out of envy and told him that he would surely slay him. Abel justly warned Cain that God only accepted the sacrifice of those that are righteous in their doings. He further went on to tell Cain that if Cain did indeed try to slay him, Abel would not retaliate and slay him because the God-fearing would never murder for the sake of envy. Abel then told Cain that in murdering him, he would carry the weight not only of his sin but also of the sins of his victim. The victim, as a result, in suffering the injustice, would be forgiven his own sins and the murderer, while being warned, would consequently increase his own sin. Abel preached powerfully and reminded Cain that the punishment for murder would be that he would spend the afterlife in the fires of Hell.

The innocent pleading and preaching of Abel had no effect upon Cain, for he was full of arrogance, pride and jealousy. He subsequently slew the righteous Abel, but in doing so, he ruined himself and became of those who remain lost. This would be the earliest example of the murder of a righteous man taking place upon the earth. In the future, many other evildoers would slay the wise and pious believers.

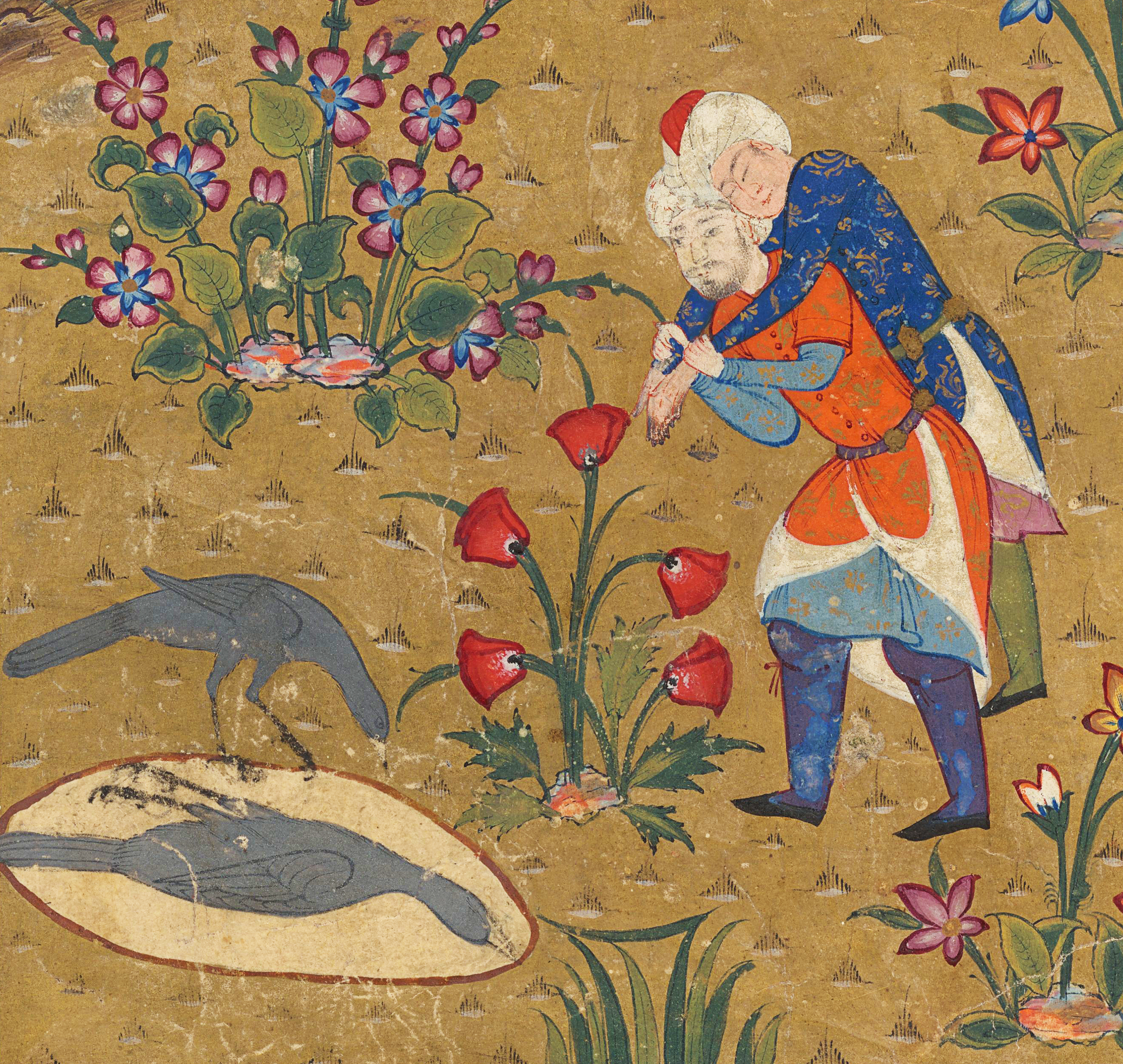
Qabil watching a crow sent from God. It teaches him to bury Habil's murdered body, in order to hide his shame.

After the murder, Allah sent a crow searching in the ground to show Cain how to hide the disgrace of his brother. Cain, in his shame, began to curse himself and he became full of guilt. The thought of the crime at last came to the murderer, as he realized indeed how dreadful it was to slay anyone, the more so as the victim was an innocent and righteous man. Full of regrets, Cain was marked with deep sorrow. The Qur'an states, "And he became of the regretful." 5:31 (Chapter 5, verse 31)

== Message ==
The Qur'an states that the story of Cain and Abel was a message for mankind, as it had told them about the consequences of murder and that the killing of a soul would be as if he/she had slain the whole of mankind. But the Qur'an states that still people rejected the message of the story, and continued to commit grave sins, such as slaying prophets and other righteous people. All the prophets who preached since the time of Adam were persecuted, insulted or reviled in one way or another. With some righteous men, however, the Qur'an states that people went one step further, in attempting to slay them or indeed slaying them. As for the slaying of the righteous, it says "Those who disbelieve in the signs of Allah and kill the prophets without right and kill those who order justice from among the people - give them tidings of a painful punishment.".

== See also ==
- Sumayya, first martyr of the followers of Muhammad
- Nabi Habeel Mosque, considered to be the burial place of Abel
