= Elioud =

Children of the Nephilim in the Apocrypha

In the Book of Enoch and Book of Jubilees, copies of which were kept by groups including the religious community of Qumran that produced the Dead Sea Scrolls, the Elioud (also transliterated Eljo) are the antediluvian children of the Nephilim, and are considered a part-angel hybrid race of their own. Like the Nephilim, the Elioud are exceptional in both ability and wickedness.

== Canonicity ==
The texts that use the term "Elioud" are non-canonical in modern Rabbinic Judaism, Western Christianity and Eastern Orthodox Christianity, but are considered canonical by the Oriental Ethiopian Orthodox Christians and Beta Israel Jews (i.e. certain Ethiopian Jews). The canonical Book of Genesis mentions Enoch, the putative source of this revelation about the Elioud only in passing (as a long-lived ancestor of Noah), and while it notes that Nephilim had children, it does not assign a name to them. Another canonical Bible passage concerning a giant at Gath and his children, likely the Anakim, is sometimes alleged to refer to the Elioud (who in that account have six fingers on each hand and each foot), although in context, these references to giants appear to refer instead to the Philistines.

Early fathers of the Christian church of the first and second centuries, as well as the bodies that formed the modern Rabbinical Jewish canon were aware of 1 Enoch and the Book of Jubilees in which these accounts were contained, and accepted the former as scripture, but by the 4th Century AD, due to a view of angels that held they could not engage in sexual intercourse, chose to omit these texts from the canon of Western Christianity and Rabbinic Judaism respectively.

== Relevance to Christian theology ==
Less literal readings of Genesis 6:4 see the reference in that passage to the intermarriage of "sons of God", meaning the godly descendants of Seth or to people faithful to God generally, with "daughters of men", meaning the godless descendants of Cain, or to people who are not faithful to God generally. This less literal reading is the one adopted, in contrast to 1 Enoch and the Book of Jubilees, by the pseudepigraphic second part of the Book of Adam and Eve.

The language of 1 Enoch that references the race of Elioud precludes less literal readings of the term "sons of God", for example, by enumerating the names of particular angels who choose to have children with human women.

== Discrepancies in the tradition ==
In some readings of the non-canonical texts, the Nephilim are children whose father is an angel and whose mother is a human and they are the "giants" (also known as Gibborim) referred to in the canonical Book of Numbers. In others, angels and human women produce children who are Gibborim, and the Nephilim have fathers who are Gibborim and human mothers. This ambiguity is also found in the non-canonical Book of Giants, fragments of which were found among the Dead Sea Scrolls.

For example, according to one account, there is a discrepancy between Aramaic, Ge'ez (i.e. Ethiopian) and Greek translations of 1 Enoch 7:2 and 7:10–11.

2 And when the angels,* the sons of heaven, beheld them, they became enamoured of them, saying to each other, Come, let us select for ourselves wives from the progeny of men, and let us beget children.
- An Aramaic text reads "Watchers" here (J.T. Milik, Aramaic Fragments of Qumran Cave 4 [Oxford: Clarendon Press, 1976], p. 167). . . .
10 Then they took wives, each choosing for himself; whom they began to approach, and with whom they cohabited; teaching them sorcery, incantations, and the dividing of roots and trees.
11 And the women conceiving brought forth giants,
- The Greek texts vary considerably from the Ethiopic text here. One Greek manuscript adds to this section, "And they [the women] bore to them [the Watchers] three races–first, the great giants. The giants brought forth [some say "slew"] the Naphelim, and the Naphelim brought forth [or "slew"] the Elioud. And they existed, increasing in power according to their greatness."

The 1913 translation of R. H. Charles of the Book of Jubilees 7:21–25 reads as follows (note that "Naphil" is a singular form of the plural "Nephilim"):

21 For owing to these three things came the flood upon the earth, namely, owing to the fornication wherein the Watchers against the law of their ordinances went a whoring after the daughters of men, and took themselves wives of all which they chose: and they made the beginning of uncleanness.
22 And they begat sons the Naphidim, and they were all unlike, and they devoured one another: and the Giants slew the Naphil, and the Naphil slew the Eljo, and the Eljo mankind, and one man another.
23 And every one sold himself to work iniquity and to shed much blood, and the earth was filled with iniquity.
24 And after this they sinned against the beasts and birds, and all that moves and walks on the earth: and much blood was shed on the earth, and every imagination and desire of men imagined vanity and evil continually.
25 And the Lord destroyed everything from off the face of the earth; because of the wickedness of their deeds, and because of the blood which they had shed in the midst of the earth He destroyed everything.

There are possible references to the Elioud in the non-canonical Book of Giants, fragments of which were found in the Dead Sea Scrolls, but a definitive reading is difficult because no complete version of this text is available to modern researchers and the available fragments are in six different archaic languages.

== See also ==
- List of angels in theology
