= The Book of Giants =

3rd-century BCE Hebrew text

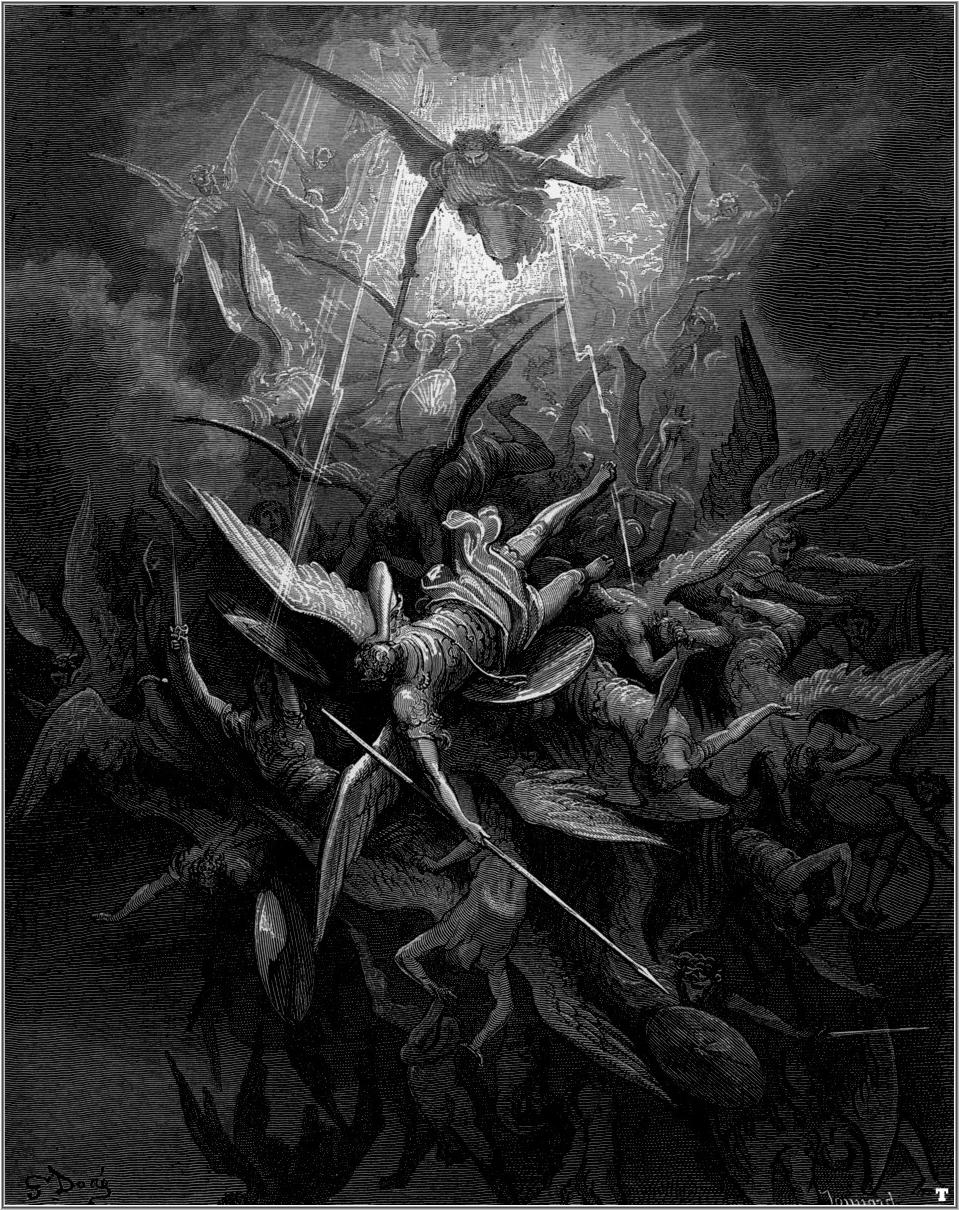
- An illustration of the War in Heaven for Milton's Paradise Lost by Gustave Doré

Information
- Religion: Manichaeism
- Language: Pahlavi, Aramaic, Syriac
- Period: Before 2nd Century BC

The Book of Giants is an apocryphal book which expands upon the Genesis narrative of the Hebrew Bible, in a similar manner to the Book of Enoch. Together with this latter work, The Book of Giants "stands as an attempt to explain how it was that wickedness had become so widespread and muscular before the flood; in so doing, it also supplies the reason why God was more than justified in sending that flood." The text's composition has been dated to before the 2nd century BC.

The Book of Giants is an antediluvian (pre-Flood) narrative that was received primarily in Manichaean literature and known at Turfan. However, the earliest known traditions for the book originate in Aramaic copies of a The Book of Giants among the Dead Sea Scrolls. References to the Giants mythology are found in: Genesis 6:1-4, the books of Enoch (Ethiopic, Slavonic, Hebrew, Greek), Jubilees, Genesis Apocryphon, 2 and 3 Baruch (Slavonic), the Damascus Document, and visions in Daniel 7:9-14. This book tells of the background and fate of these antediluvial giants and their fathers, the Watchers (called grigori in the Slavonic 2 Enoch), the sons of God or holy ones (Daniel 4:13, 17) who rebelled against heaven when—in violation of the strict "boundaries of creation"—they commingled, in their lust, with the "daughters of men."

Their even more corrupt offspring, the giants, were variously called thereafter nephilim, gibborim, or rephaim, being the earthly half-breed races that fought against God and his righteous followers whose numbers diminished as the world was overwhelmed with corruption and evil; the Manichaean fragments give these wicked ones the general name demons (Greek Enoch calls them bastards). Though the terms for the Watchers and their offspring are often confused in their various translations and iterations, collectively these rebellious races are referred to as the fallen angels in the apocryphal sources, as also in the biblical narratives that reference them.

== Origins in ancient tradition ==
Since before the latter half of the twentieth century, The Book of Giants had long been known as a Middle Iranian work (which some scholars now believe was written originally in Eastern Aramaic) that circulated among the Manichaeans as a composition attributed to Mani (c. AD 216–274)—a Parthian citizen of southern Mesopotamia who appears to have been a follower of Elkesai, a Jewish-Christian prophet and visionary who lived in the early years of the second century. Some scholars, concordant with supporting evidence for the ancient sect's geographical distribution, have posited both genetic and ritual-custom similarities between the Elcesaites and the earlier Second Temple Jewish sect of the Essenes (Essaioi "Saints").

During the twentieth century a number of finds shed considerable light on the literary evidence for The Book of Giants. The 1943 publication by W. B. Henning of the Manichaean fragments from The Book of Giants discovered at Turfan in Western China (in what is now Xinjiang Province) have substantiated the many references to its circulation among, and use by, the Manichaeans. Further identification of the Manichaeans edition of The Book of Giants was revealed in 1971 when Jósef T. Milik discovered several additional Aramaic fragments of Enochic works among the Dead Sea Scrolls; finding that the fragments bore close resemblance to Mani's The Book of Giants, he concluded that Giants was originally an integral part of 1 Enoch itself. These fragmentary scrolls in Aramaic, which represented an Enochic tradition that was likely introduced to Mani in his sojourn with the Elcesaites, appeared to have been the primary source utilized by Mani in the compilation of his book, in which he made the legend of the Watchers and the giants "a cornerstone of his theological speculations." For many scholars, the Qumran fragments confirmed The Book of Giants to originally have been an independent composition from the Second Temple period.

Among the fragments discovered at Qumran, ten manuscripts of The Book of Giants are identified by Loren Stuckenbruck. These fragments (1Q23, 1Q24, 2Q26, 4Q203, 4Q530, 4Q531, 4Q532, 4Q556, 4Q206, and 6Q8) were found in caves 1, 2, 4, and 6 at the site. These discoveries led to further classification of the Enochic works. In the third group of classification, ten Aramaic manuscripts contain parts of The Book of Giants which were only known through the Manichaean sources until the recognition of them at Qumran.

There has been much speculation regarding the original language of The Book of Giants. It was generally believed to have had a Semitic origin. Indeed, the discovery of this text at Qumran led scholars, such as C. P. van Andel and Rudolf Otto, to believe that while these ancient Aramaic compositions of the book were the earliest known, the work probably had even earlier Hebrew antecedents. It was R. H. Charles, translator and publisher in 1906 of The Book of Enoch, who asserted that Enoch was "built upon the debris of" an older Noah saga than that in Genesis which only cryptically refers to the Enoch myth. But Milik himself offered his own hypothesis that Enoch's 'creation story' and law of God account naturally predate the Mosaic Sinai accounts in Genesis: He saw Genesis 6:1-4—long a puzzling passage to biblical scholars—as a quotation from what he believed ultimately to have been the earlier Enoch source. More recent scholarship, such as that of Klaus Beyer, indicates that The Book of Giants (parts of which have been found in Hebrew at Qumran) was "originally composed in Hebrew during the 3rd century BCE, while the names of the giants Gilgamesh and Hobabish betray a Babylonian provenance"—which Babylonian-origins claim based on the name appearances, however, is refuted by Martínez.

== Contents ==
=== Dead Sea Scrolls version ===
The text unearthed at Qumran in 1948 was composed of fragments in Aramaic. Because of the book's fragmentation, it was difficult for the documents' linguistic researchers and specialists to know, in its subsequently varied permutations, the exact order of the content. The Giants work is closely related to the 1 Enoch analogue, which also tells a story of the giants, but one which is far more elaborate. The Qumrannic The Book of Giants also bears resemblance to the Manichaean edition of The Book of Giants that came after it. Scholars, beyond their many questions of the Enochic tradition's oral or written transmission, still don't know why the Qumran community considered the Enochic texts so important that they possessed and retained so many copies in comparison to other textual traditions found there.

The Book of Giants is an expansive narrative of the biblical story of the birth of "giants" in Genesis 6.1-4. In this story, the giants came into being when the Watcher "sons of God" (who, per the story's corroborative Jubilees account [Jub 4:15; 5:6], God originally dispatched to earth for the purpose of instructing and nurturing humanity "in proper ritual and ethical conduct," "to do what is just and upright upon the earth") had sexual intercourse with human women, who then birthed a hybrid race of giants. These Watchers (grigori) and giants (nephilim) engaged in destructive and grossly immoral actions which devastated humanity, including the revealing of heaven's holy "secrets" or "mysteries to their wives and children" and to mankind generally.

When Enoch heard of this, he was distressed and petitioned God, who in his longsuffering and by divine revelation and counsel called Enoch to preach repentance unto them, that the earthly races might avoid God's wrath and destruction. In his mercy, God chose also to give the fallen Watchers an additional chance to repent by transmitting dreams to several of their giant-sons, including two brothers named Ohyah and Hahyah who relayed the dreams to an assembly of their grigori and nephilim companions. This assembly of Watcher-giant associates were perplexed by the dreams, so they sent a giant named Mahway to Enoch's abode and to the places of his preaching (for Mahway had been instructed that he must first "hear" the prophet speak before petitioning him for the "oracle"). Enoch, in his attempt to intercede on their behalf, provided not only the oracle that the Watchers and giants had requested, but also twin "tablets" that revealed the full meaning of their dreams and God's future judgment against them.

When the Watchers and giants had at last heard heaven's response, many chose, in their transcendent pride and arrogance, rather than to turn from their evil ways, to act in defiance against God. The Qumran fragments are incomplete at this point.

The Qumrannic edition of The Book of Giants, like its Manichaean counterpart, affiliates the names of the Sumerian hero Gilgamesh and the monster Humbaba with the Watchers and giants.

=== Manichaean version ===
The Manichaean version is similar to the one found in Qumran, only adapted to Mani's story of the cosmos. The fallen angels are here archontic demons escaped from their prisons in the sky, where they were placed when the world was constructed. They would have caused a brief revolt, and in the process, two hundred of them escaped to the Earth. While most given names are simply transliterated into Iranian language, Ohyah and Hahyah are renamed Sam and Nariman. This version also contains a complete ending, telling how the forces of the Light, led by four angels identified with Michael, Gabriel, Raphael, and Istrael, subdue the demons and their offspring in battle.

=== Other texts ===
Much of the content in The Book of Giants is similar, and most closely relates, to 1 Enoch 7:3-6, a passage which sheds light on the characterizing features of the giants. It reveals that the giants were born of the Watcher "sons of God" and the "daughters of men." The giants, as their "prostituted" half-breed offspring, began to devour the works of what they perceived to be a titan or giant (mankind) and went on to kill and to viciously exploit them in slavery and sexual debauchery. They also had sexual intercourse with animals, and raped one another. They murdered on a massive scale, and also aborted their own children.

== Interpretive issues between Qumran and Turfan ==
The authorship of the Qumranic edition of The Book of Giants is still a question among scholars. Some initially believed that the manuscript (despite so many extant copies from Qumran of the overall Enochic work) to have been little used among the desert sectaries; but more recent scholarship declares: "We know that the Qumran Essenes copied, studied, and valued the writings and teachings ascribed to Enoch". The Qumran discoveries decidedly ruled out any possibility that the Manicheans were the composers of The Book of Giants, for their work followed later.

When J.T. Milik first proposed the late date of the Book of Parables in 1 Enoch, he proposed that the section that had been replaced was the Book of Giants. One of the recovered fragments of the Book of the Giants from Qumran was written by the same scribe who transcribed a portion of the Book of Enoch, and it is thought that they could belong to the same manuscript (4QEnGiants^{a}ar and 4QEn^{c}ar). Although it is not certain, this would make the Book of Giants the missing piece of Qumran’s Enochic pentateuch, later replaced by the Book of Parables in the version of 1 Enoch that was translated into Ge’ez.

As far as comparisons that might be made with canonical texts, the books of Daniel and 1 Enoch both have similarities; for example in their visionary elements. Stuckenbruck suggests that "these similarities ... allow for the possibility that the author of Daniel 7 knew the early Enochic traditions well enough to draw on and then adapt them for his own purposes. Nowhere is this clearer than in the throne-theophany itself".

All of these Enochic writings would have held significance from the beginning of the first century. Indeed, the early Christian church treasured Enoch and few early Church Fathers quoted from and held it as divinely inspired or authoritative, even when it was never included in the church canon list. However, due in no small part to the influence of the Alexandrian philosophers who ill-favored it—its contents thought by many of the Hellenistic era to be foolish or strange—the overall Enochic work rapidly ran afoul of ideas held by the Christian and Jewish doctors, who considered it a tainted product of the Essenes of Qumran. Milik has speculated the reason why the book was censored by Christian authors was its popular usage by Manichaeans. The book was soon banned by such orthodox authorities as Hilary, Jerome, and Augustine in the fourth century and it gradually passed out of circulation, finally becoming lost to the knowledge of Western Christendom—only sundry fragments remained.

== See also ==
- Book of Enoch
- Og
