= Nephilim =

Biblical figures feared for their strength before the Flood

The Nephilim (/ˈnɛfɪˌlɪm/; Hebrew: נְפִילִים, romanized: Nəfīlīm) are enigmatic figures mentioned in several passages of the Hebrew Bible and later Jewish and Christian literature. They are traditionally associated with extraordinary size, strength, or status, though the biblical texts provide only brief and ambiguous descriptions. The earliest reference appears in Genesis 6:1–4, where the Nephilim are linked to the "mighty men of old" and to the marital relations between the "sons of God" and the "daughters of men". Their identity, origin, and role in early biblical history have been the subject of extensive debate among scholars, theologians, and interpreters.

The meaning of the term Nephilim is uncertain. Many translations render the word as "giants," influenced by the Septuagint’s use of the Greek term gigantes, though this may reflect later interpretive traditions rather than the original Hebrew sense. Some scholars derive the term from the Hebrew root n-p-l ("to fall"), leading to interpretations such as "fallen ones" or "those who cause others to fall," while others propose meanings related to violence, domination, or social oppression. Because the biblical text does not define the term explicitly, later Jewish and Christian writings played a major role in shaping the modern understanding of the Nephilim.

The Nephilim appear again in Numbers 13:33, where ten of the Twelve Spies report encountering formidable inhabitants in Canaan described as descendants of the Nephilim. This passage has contributed to the longstanding association of the Nephilim with great physical stature, though some scholars argue that the spies’ report may reflect exaggeration, fear, or rhetorical emphasis rather than literal description.

Interpretations of the Nephilim vary widely across religious and academic traditions. One influential view, preserved in Second Temple literature such as 1 Enoch and Jubilees, identifies the Nephilim as the offspring of rebellious angels (the Watchers) and human women, portraying them as destructive giants whose corruption contributed to the moral decline preceding the flood. Another major interpretation, found in some early Jewish and Christian commentaries, understands the Nephilim as powerful human rulers or warriors, possibly arising from intermarriage between the righteous line of Seth and the unrighteous line of Cain. A third approach views the Nephilim as legendary or symbolic figures reflecting ancient Near Eastern traditions about semi-divine heroes or primordial beings.

Outside the canonical Hebrew Bible, related terms or concepts appear in several deuterocanonical books—including Judith 16:6, Sirach 16:7, Baruch 3:26–28, and Wisdom 14:6—and possibly in Ezekiel 32, where scholars debate whether the term refers directly to the Nephilim or to a related class of fallen warriors. These texts contributed to the development of later Jewish and Christian traditions about ancient giants, divine-human unions, and the pre-flood world.

In modern scholarship, the Nephilim are studied within the broader context of ancient Near Eastern mythology, comparative linguistics, and the history of biblical interpretation. Parallels have been drawn between the Nephilim and regional traditions involving giant clans, heroic demigods, or semi-divine figures, though the extent of these connections remains debated. The Nephilim have also become prominent in contemporary popular culture, appearing in novels, films, video games, and speculative theories, where they are often reimagined as hybrid beings, ancient superhuman races, or remnants of a lost primordial world.

== Etymology ==
The Brown-Driver-Briggs Lexicon (1908) gives the meaning of Nephilim as "giants", and warns that proposed etymologies of the word are "all very precarious". Many suggested interpretations are based on the assumption that the word is a derivative of Hebrew verbal root n-p-l (נ־פ־ל) "fall". Girdlestone (1871, p. 91) argued the word comes from the hif'il causative stem, possibly indicating that the name 'Nephilim' is to be understood as 'those that cause others to fall down'. Ronald Hendel states that it is a passive form: 'Ones who have fallen', grammatically analogous to paqid 'one who is appointed' (i.e., a deputy or overseer), asir 'one who is bound' (i.e., a prisoner). It is also argued that the "fallen" refer to those who "fell in battle", similar to the gibborim.

The majority of ancient biblical translations – including the Septuagint, Theodotion, Latin Vulgate, Samaritan Targum, Targum Onkelos, and Targum Neofiti – interpret the word to mean "giants". Symmachus translates it as "the violent ones" (Note: The Greek translation reads 'οι βιαιοι; the singular root βιαιος means "violence" or "forcible".) and Aquila's translation has been interpreted to mean either "the fallen ones" or "the ones falling [upon their enemies]." (Note: The rendering he fell upon, attacked [in Symmachus, Genesis 6:6] is something of a puzzle ... If it has been faithfully recorded, it may be related to the rendering of Aquila for the Nephilim in 6:4, οι επιπιπτοντες.)

== Origins of belief ==
Archaeologist G.E. Wright states that belief in the Nephilim, especially as giants, originated from the Hebrews’ contemplation of Transjordian megalithic structures and cyclopean masonry walls of Canaanite cities, with some being 18 feet thick. Nonetheless, he notes that ancient Canaanites were relatively short, before and after 3000 BC, with no significant findings of abnormally sized aborigines. Biblical professor Brian R. Doak believes that Nephilim lore is a polemic against the tropes of epic and heroism, commonly found in the worldviews of cultures similar to the Hebrews'. J.C. Greenfield similarly believes that Nephilim lore is based on "the negative aspects of the Apkallu tradition" in Sumerian mythology. The Apkallu were seven antediluvian culture heroes who were praised for their exceptional wisdom. In fact, some were called "the son of Ea".

Brand et al. (2023) argue that the Nephilim refer to elite or royal warriors from legendary antiquity, who do not necessarily have abnormal stature or divine parentage. They view the Nephilim in Numbers 13–14 as autochthonous elite warriors who dwelt in pre-Israelite Canaan. Ellen White (not to be confused with Ellen G. White) believes that their purpose, narratively speaking, is to die so that God's chosen, who are the "underdogs", could prevail.

The Anakites, who are associated with the Nephilim, are mentioned in the Egyptian Execration texts of the Middle Kingdom (2055–1650 BC) as one of Egypt's political enemies in Canaan.

== In the Hebrew Bible ==
In the Bible, there are three interconnected passages referencing the nephilim. Two of them appear in the Torah. The first occurrence is in Genesis 6:1–4, immediately before the account of Noah's Ark. Genesis 6:4 reads as follows:

The Nephilim were in the earth in those days, and also after that, when the sons of God came in unto the daughters of men, and they bore children to them; the same were the mighty men that were of old, the men of renown.

"Those days" were a period when the human population on the earth had started to expand, when men began "to be plentiful on the earth".

Where the Jewish Publication Society's translation simply transliterates the Hebrew nephilim as "Nephilim", the King James Version translates the term as "giants".

The nature of the Nephilim is complicated by the ambiguity of Genesis 6:4, which leaves it unclear whether they are the "sons of God" or their offspring who are the "mighty men of old, men of renown". Richard Hess takes it to mean that the Nephilim are the offspring, as does P. W. Coxon.

The second is Numbers 13:32–33, where ten of the Twelve Spies describe the Anakites (a Rephaite tribe) as descendants of the Nephilim:

And there we saw the Nephilim, the sons of Anak, who come of the Nephilim; and we were in our own sight as grasshoppers, and so we were in their sight.

Outside the Pentateuch there is one more passage indirectly referencing nephilim and this is Ezekiel 32:17–32. Of special significance is Ezekiel 32:27, which contains a phrase of disputed meaning. With the traditional vowels added to the text in the medieval period, the phrase is read gibborim nophlim ("'fallen warriors" or "fallen Gibborim"), although some scholars read the phrase as gibborim nephilim ("Nephilim warriors" or "warriors, Nephilim"). According to R.S. Hendel, the phrase should be interpreted as "warriors, the Nephilim" in a reference to Genesis 6:4. The verse as understood by Hendel reads:

They lie with the warriors, the Nephilim of old, who descended to Sheol with their weapons of war. They placed their swords beneath their heads and their shields upon their bones, for the terror of the warriors was upon the land of the living.

B. R. Doak, on the other hand, proposes to read the term as the Hebrew verb "fallen" (נופלים nophlim), not a use of the specific term "Nephilim", but still according to Doak a clear reference to the Nephilim tradition as found in Genesis.

== Interpretations ==
=== Giants ===
The earliest translations of the Bible, the Septuagint, composed in the 3rd or 2nd century BC, renders the said word as gigantes. In Greek mythology the gigantes were beings of great strength and aggression but not necessarily of great size. The choice made by the Greek translators has been preserved in Latin translation. The Vulgate, compiled in the 4th or 5th century AD, transcribes the Greek term rather than translating the Hebrew nefilim. From there, the tradition of the giant progeny of the sons of God and the daughters of men spread to later medieval translations of the Bible.

The decision of the Greek translators to render the Hebrew nefilim as Greek gigantes is a separate matter. The Hebrew nefilim means literally "the fallen ones" and the strict translation into Greek would be peptokotes, which in fact appears in the Septuagint of Ezekiel 32:22–27. It seems then that the authors of Septuagint wished not only to simply translate the foreign term into Greek, but also to employ a term which would be intelligible and meaningful for their Hellenistic audiences. Given the complex meaning of the nefilim which emerged from the three interconnected biblical passages (human–divine hybrids in Genesis 6, autochthonous people in Numbers 13 and ancient warriors damned in the underworld in Ezekiel 32), the Greek translators recognized some similarities. First and foremost, both nefilim and gigantes possessed an ambiguous identity, being a mixture of the human and divine. They were also viewed with fascination and moral contempt. Secondly, both were presented as impersonating chaotic qualities and posing some serious danger to gods and humans. Lastly, both gigantes and nefilim were clearly connected with the underworld and were said to have originated from earth, and they both end up closed therein.

In 1 Enoch, the Nephilim were "great giants, whose height was three hundred cubits". Assuming 1 cubit is 18 inches (46 cm), this would make them 450 feet (140 m) tall. However, "three hundred cubits" is considered by scholars to be a translation error in the Ethiopian version. The earlier Greek translation is considered to be closer to the original: "The giants gave birth to Nephilim, and from Nephilim, 'Elioud' came out, and they were growing up according to their grandeur." This matches with Book of Jubilees 7:21–22, which states that there are three races of giants: Naphidim, Naphil, and Eljo. Therefore, instead of being about the giants' height, the verse actually refers to the three races of giants including Elioud. Knowing this, John Baty, in his 1839 translation of the Ethiopian version of 1 Enoch, rendered that verse according to the Greek text.

The Quran refers to the people of Ād in Quran 26:130 whom the prophet Hud declares to be like jabbarin (Hebrew: gibborim), probably a reference to the Biblical Nephilim. The people of Ād are said to be giants, the tallest among them 100 ft (30 m) high. However, according to Islamic legend, the ʿĀd were not wiped out by the Flood, since some of them had been too tall to be drowned. Instead, God destroyed them after they rejected further warnings. After death, they were banished into the lower layers of hell.

=== Fallen angels ===
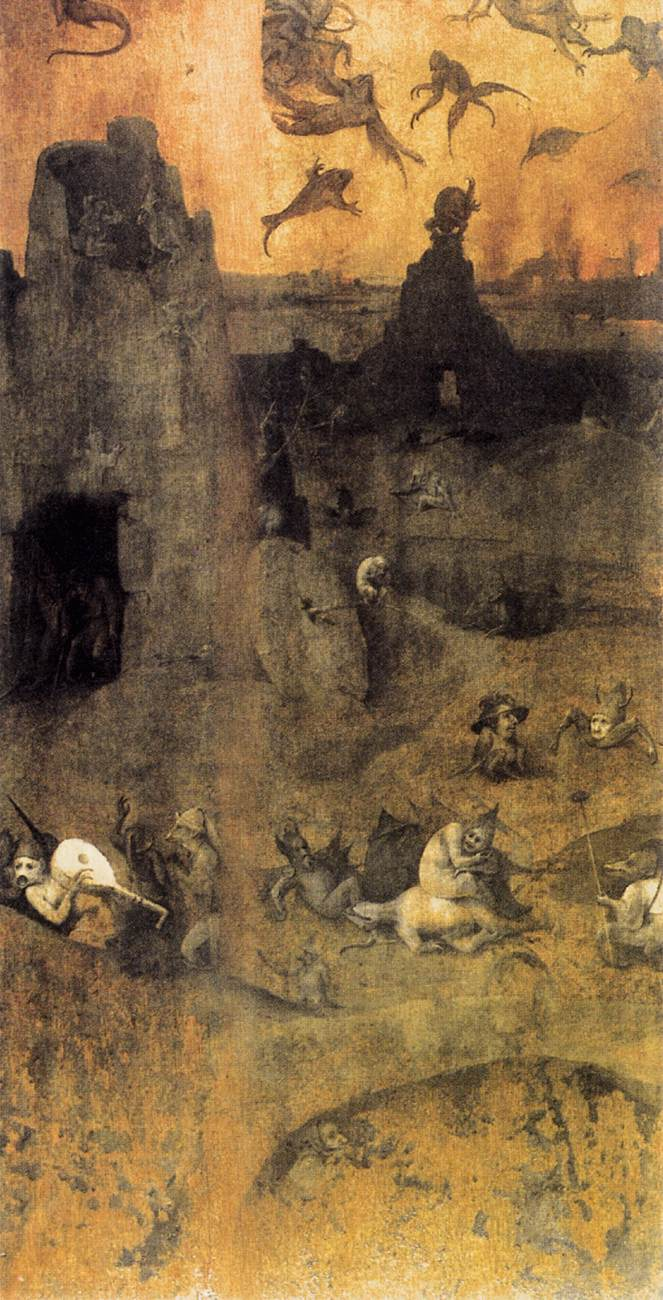
The Fall of the Rebel Angels by Hieronymus Bosch, based on Genesis 6:1–4

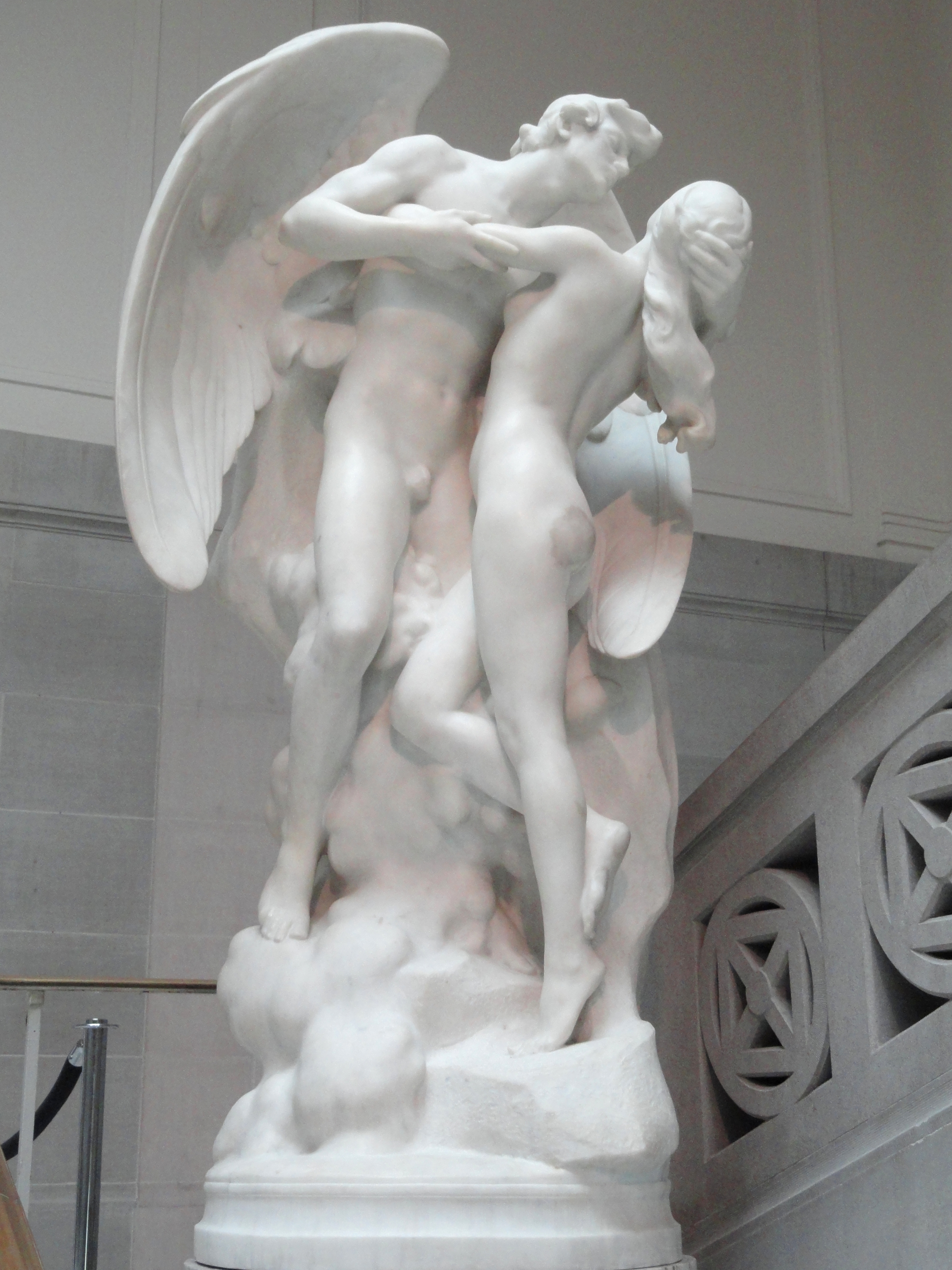
The Sons of God Saw the Daughters of Men That They Were Fair, sculpture by Daniel Chester French

From the third century BC onwards, references are found in the Enochic literature, the Dead Sea Scrolls, Jubilees, the Testament of Reuben, 2 Baruch, Josephus, and the Book of Jude (compare with 2 Peter 2). For example:

1 Enoch 7:[2]"And when the angels, [3]the sons of heaven, beheld them, they became enamoured of them, saying to each other, Come, let us select for ourselves wives from the progeny of men, and let us beget children."

Some Christian apologists, such as Tertullian and especially Lactantius, shared this opinion.

The earliest statement in a secondary commentary explicitly interpreting this to mean that angelic beings mated with humans can be traced to the rabbinical Targum Pseudo-Jonathan, and it has since become especially commonplace in modern Christian commentaries. This line of interpretation finds additional support in the text of Genesis 6:4, which juxtaposes the sons of God (male gender, divine nature) with the daughters of men (female gender, human nature). From this parallelism it could be inferred that the sons of God are understood as some superhuman beings.

The New American Bible commentary draws a parallel to the Epistle of Jude and the statements set forth in Genesis, suggesting that the Epistle refers implicitly to the paternity of Nephilim as heavenly beings who came to earth and had sexual intercourse with women. (Note: "The angels too, who did not keep to their own domain but deserted their proper dwelling, he has kept in eternal chains, in gloom, for the judgement of the great day. Likewise, Sodom and Gomorrah, and the surrounding towns, which, in the same manner as they, indulged in sexual promiscuity and practiced unnatural vice, serve as an example by undergoing a punishment of eternal fire.") The footnotes of the Jerusalem Bible suggest that the biblical author intended the Nephilim to be an "anecdote of a superhuman race". Superhuman, in this context, refers to the extremity of their wickedness. (Note: The author does not present this episode as a myth nor, on the other hand, does he deliver judgment on its actual occurrence; he records the anecdote of a superhuman race simply to serve as an example of the increase in human wickedness which was to provoke the Flood.)

Some Christian commentators have argued against this view, citing Jesus's statement that angels do not marry. Others disagree since Jesus also compared angels to men, thus implying the former's ability to have sex. Angels are also never explicitly described as being incapable of marriage. The absence of marriage among angels can be thus compared to willful celibacy.

Evidence cited in favor of the fallen angels interpretation includes the fact that the phrase "the sons of God" (Hebrew: בְּנֵי הָֽאֱלֹהִים; or "sons of the gods") is used twice outside of Genesis 6, in the Book of Job (1:6 and 2:1) where the phrase explicitly references angels. The Septuagint manuscript Codex Alexandrinus reading of Genesis 6:2 renders this phrase as "the angels of God" while Codex Vaticanus reads "sons".

Another modern view that aligns with the fallen angel interpretation includes Nephilim being the offspring of demon-possessed men and women.

==== Second Temple Judaism ====
The story of the Nephilim is further elaborated in the Book of Enoch. The Greek, Aramaic, and main Ge'ez manuscripts of 1 Enoch and Jubilees obtained in the 19th century and held in the British Museum and Vatican Library, connect the origin of the Nephilim with the fallen angels, and in particular with the egrḗgoroi (watchers). Samyaza, an angel of high rank, is described as leading a rebel sect of angels in a descent to earth to have sexual intercourse with human females:

And it came to pass when the children of men had multiplied that in those days were born unto them beautiful and comely daughters. And the angels, the children of the heaven, saw and lusted after them, and said to one another: "Come, let us choose us wives from among the children of men and beget us children." And Semjaza, who was their leader, said unto them: "I fear ye will not indeed agree to do this deed, and I alone shall have to pay the penalty of a great sin." And they all answered him and said: "Let us all swear an oath, and all bind ourselves by mutual imprecations not to abandon this plan but to do this thing." Then sware they all together and bound themselves by mutual imprecations upon it. And they were in all two hundred; who descended in the days of Jared on the summit of Mount Hermon, and they called it Mount Hermon, because they had sworn and bound themselves by mutual imprecations upon it ...

In this tradition, the children of the Nephilim are called the Elioud, who are considered a separate race from the Nephilim, but they share the fate of the Nephilim.

Some believe the fallen angels who begat the Nephilim were cast into Tartarus (2 Peter 2:4, Jude 1:6) (Greek Enoch 20:2), (Note: "He may be Uriel, if it is legitimate to compare 1 Enoch xx. 2, according to which he was the angel set over the world and Tartarus (ὁ ἐπὶ τοῦ κόσμου καὶ τοῦ Ταρτάρου). In 1 Enoch, Tartarus is the nether world generally.") a place of "total darkness". An interpretation is that God granted ten percent of the disembodied spirits of the Nephilim to remain after the Flood, as demons, to try to lead the human race astray until the final Judgment. Another similar view was proposed by Dr. Michael Heiser, an Old Testament scholar from the University of Pennsylvania and the University of Wisconsin-Madison. In his book The Unseen Realm he states that the disembodied spirits of the Nephilim became what has been known as demons or unclean spirits.

In addition to Enoch, the Book of Jubilees (7:21–25) also states that ridding the Earth of these Nephilim was one of God's purposes for flooding the Earth in Noah's time. These works describe the Nephilim as being evil giants.

The New Testament Epistle of Jude (14–15) cites from 1 Enoch 1:9, which many scholars believe is based on Deuteronomy 33:2. (Note: "1.9 In 'He comes with ten thousands of His holy ones' the text reproduces the Masoretic of Deut. 33:2 in reading אָתָא = ἔρχεται, whereas the three Targums, the Syriac, and Vulgate read אִתֹּה = μετ' αὐτοῦ. Here the LXX diverges wholly. The reading אתא is recognised as original. The writer of 1–5 therefore used the Hebrew text and presumably wrote in Hebrew."Charles (1912), p. lviii) (Note: "We may note especially that 1:1, 3–4, 9, allude unmistakably to Deuteronomy 33:1–2 (along with other passages in the Hebrew Bible), implying that the author, like some other Jewish writers, read Deuteronomy 33–34, the last words of Moses in the Torah, as prophecy of the future history of Israel, and 33:2 as referring to the eschatological theophany of God as judge.") (Note: "The introduction ... picks up various biblical passages and re-interprets them, applying them to Enoch. Two passages are central to it: The first is Deuteronomy 33:1 ... the second is Numbers 24:3–4.") To most commentators this confirms that the author of Jude regarded the Enochic interpretations of Genesis 6 as correct; however, others have questioned this.

=== Descendants of Seth and Cain ===
References to the offspring of Seth rebelling from God and mingling with the daughters of Cain are found from the second century AD onwards in both Christian and Jewish sources (e.g., Rabbi Shimon bar Yochai, Augustine of Hippo, Sextus Julius Africanus, and the Letters attributed to St. Clement). It is also the view expressed in the modern canonical Amharic Ethiopian Orthodox Bible: Henok 2:1–3

"and the Offspring of Seth, who were upon the Holy Mount, saw them and loved them. And they told one another, 'Come, let us choose for us daughters from Cain's children; let us bear children for us.'"

Orthodox Judaism has taken a stance against the idea that Genesis 6 refers to angels or that angels could intermarry with men. Shimon bar Yochai pronounced a curse on anyone teaching this idea. Rashi and Nachmanides followed this. Pseudo-Philo (Biblical Antiquities 3:1–3) may also imply that the "sons of God" were human. This is also the rendering suggested in the Targum Onkelos, Symmachus and the Samaritan Targum, which read "sons of the rulers", where Targum Neophyti reads "sons of the judges".

Likewise, a long-held view among some Christians is that the "sons of God" were the formerly righteous descendants of Seth who rebelled, while the "daughters of men" were the unrighteous descendants of Cain, and the Nephilim the offspring of their union. (Note: Later Judaism and almost all the earliest ecclesiastical writers identify the "sons of God" with the fallen angels; but from the fourth century onwards, as the idea of angelic natures becomes less material, the Fathers commonly take the "sons of God" to be Seth's descendants and the "daughters of men" those of Cain.) This view, dating to at least the 1st century AD in Jewish literature as described above, is also found in Christian sources from the 3rd century if not earlier, with references throughout the Clementine literature, as well as in Sextus Julius Africanus, Ephrem the Syrian, and others. Holders of this view have looked for support in Jesus' statement that "in those days before the flood they [humans] were ... marrying and giving in marriage" (Matthew 24:38, emphasis added).

Some individuals and groups, including St. Augustine, John Chrysostom, and John Calvin, take the view of Genesis 6:2 that the "Angels" who fathered the Nephilim referred to certain human males from the lineage of Seth, who were called sons of God probably in reference to their prior covenant with Yahweh (cf. Deuteronomy 14:1; 32:5); according to these sources, these men had begun to pursue bodily interests, and so took wives of "the daughters of men", e.g., those who were descended from Cain or from any people who did not worship God.

This also is the view of the Ethiopian Orthodox Church, supported by their own Ge'ez manuscripts and Amharic translation of the Haile Selassie Bible—where the books of 1 Enoch and Jubilees, counted as canonical by this church, differ from western academic editions. (Note: The Amharic text of Henok 2:1–3 (i.e. 1 En) in the 1962 Ethiopian Orthodox Bible may be translated as follows: "After mankind abounded, it became thus: And in that season, handsome comely children were born to them; and the offspring of Seth, who were upon the Holy Mount, saw them and loved them. And they told one another, 'Come, let us choose for us daughters from Cain's children; let us bear children for us.'") The "Sons of Seth view" is also the view presented in a few extra-biblical, yet ancient works, including Clementine literature, the 3rd century Cave of Treasures, and the c. 6th century Ge'ez work The Conflict of Adam and Eve with Satan. In these sources, these offspring of Seth were said to have disobeyed God, by breeding with the Cainites and producing wicked children "who were all unlike", thus angering God into bringing about the Deluge, as in the Conflict:

Certain wise men of old wrote concerning them, and say in their [sacred] books that angels came down from heaven and mingled with the daughters of Cain, who bare unto them these giants. But these [wise men] err in what they say. God forbid such a thing, that angels who are spirits, should be found committing sin with human beings. Never, that cannot be. And if such a thing were of the nature of angels, or Satans, that fell, they would not leave one woman on earth, undefiled ... But many men say, that angels came down from heaven, and joined themselves to women, and had children by them. This cannot be true. But they were children of Seth, who were of the children of Adam, that dwelt on the mountain, high up, while they preserved their virginity, their innocence and their glory like angels; and were then called 'angels of God'. But when they transgressed and mingled with the children of Cain, and begat children, ill-informed men said, that angels had come down from heaven, and mingled with the daughters of men, who bear them giants.

=== Offspring of Orion ===
In Aramean culture, the term nephilim may have referred to the offspring of Orion in mythology. The Brown–Driver–Briggs lexicon notes this as a "dubious etymology" and "all very precarious".

== Arabian paganism ==
Fallen angels were believed by Arab pagans to be sent to earth in the form of men. Some of them mated with humans and gave rise to hybrid children. As recorded by Al-Jahiz, a common belief held that Abu Jurhum, the ancestor of the Jurhum tribe, was actually the son of a disobedient angel and a human woman.

== Fossil remains of giants ==
Alleged discoveries of Nephilim remains have been a common source of hoaxing and misidentification.

In 1577, a series of large bones discovered near Lucerne were interpreted as the bones of an antediluvian giant about 5.8 m (19 ft) tall. In 1786, Johann Friedrich Blumenbach found out that these remains belonged to a mammoth. Cotton Mather believed that fossilized leg bones and teeth discovered near Albany, New York in 1705 were the remains of Nephilim who perished in a great flood. Paleontologists have identified these as mastodon remains. In 1869, the Cardiff Giant, a hoax intended to fool believers in Nephilim, was supposedly discovered in Cardiff, New York.

== In popular culture ==
The name and idea of Nephilim, like many other religious concepts, is sometimes used in popular culture. Examples include the gothic rock band Fields of the Nephilim; The Renquist Quartet novels by Mick Farren; The Mortal Instruments, The Infernal Devices, The Last Hours, The Dark Artifices and other books in The Shadowhunter Chronicles series by Cassandra Clare; the Hush, Hush series by Becca Fitzpatrick; the book Many Waters by Madeleine L'Engle; and TV series The X-Files, Hex and Supernatural. Erich von Däniken, in his best-selling Chariots of the Gods (1968), claimed that Nephilim were "skyfallers" from higher dimensions.

In the video game series Darksiders, the Four Horsemen of the Apocalypse are said to be Nephilim, wherein the Nephilim were created by the unholy union of angels and demons. Dante and Vergil, the main characters of the game DmC: Devil May Cry (2013), a reboot of the popular original series Devil May Cry, are also referred to as Nephilim; being the offspring of the demon Sparda and the angel Eva. In the trading card game Magic: The Gathering, the Nephilim are interpreted as "Old Gods" from before modern society. In Diablo 3, the Nephalem were the first humans upon Sanctuary, created as a result of the union between angels and demons. They figure prominently in the plot of Antarktos Rising by author Jeremy Robinson. In the heist-themed first-person-shooter Payday 2, several paintings, artifacts, and far off visuals reference the Nephilim, and a secret ending to the game brings in alien technology supposedly left by the Nephilim. A creature referred to as "Nephilim" appears in season 2 of the Japanese animated series Symphogear. Nephilim is a role-playing game about powerful elemental entities reincarnating into human beings. Nephilim feature in the plot of Indiana Jones and the Great Circle, with the title character encountering a secret order in the Vatican whose members are giants alleged to be the descendants of Nephilim.

There are several movies, videos, documentaries, and podcasts on Nephilim.

== See also ==
- Alien abduction
- Anakim
- Asura
- Book of Giants
- Cain tradition
- Cambion
- Changeling
- Demigod
- Emim
- Hybrid (biology)
- Incubus
- List of angels in theology
- List of giants in mythology and folklore
- Maryannu
- Nephele
- Pre-Adamite – Belief that humans existed before the biblical character Adam
- Quinametzin
- Rephaim
- Serpent seed
- Titan (mythology)
