= Sons of God =

Phrase used in the Hebrew Bible and Apocrypha

Sons of God (Biblical Hebrew: בְנֵי־הָאֱלֹהִים, romanized: Bənē hāʾĔlōhīm, literally: "the sons of Elohim") or sons of gods, also rendered as divine beings, is a phrase used in the Tanakh or Old Testament and in Christian Apocrypha. The phrase is also used in Kabbalah where bene elohim are part of different Jewish angelic hierarchies.

The root for this phrase may have originally referred to a group of supernatural beings ("sons of the gods"), and lesser divinities in Canaanite religions. They would be interpreted as angels or watchers in the later periods of Second Temple Judaism, or instead as god kings, as well as the righteous offspring of Seth by others starting from the 2nd–4th century CE.

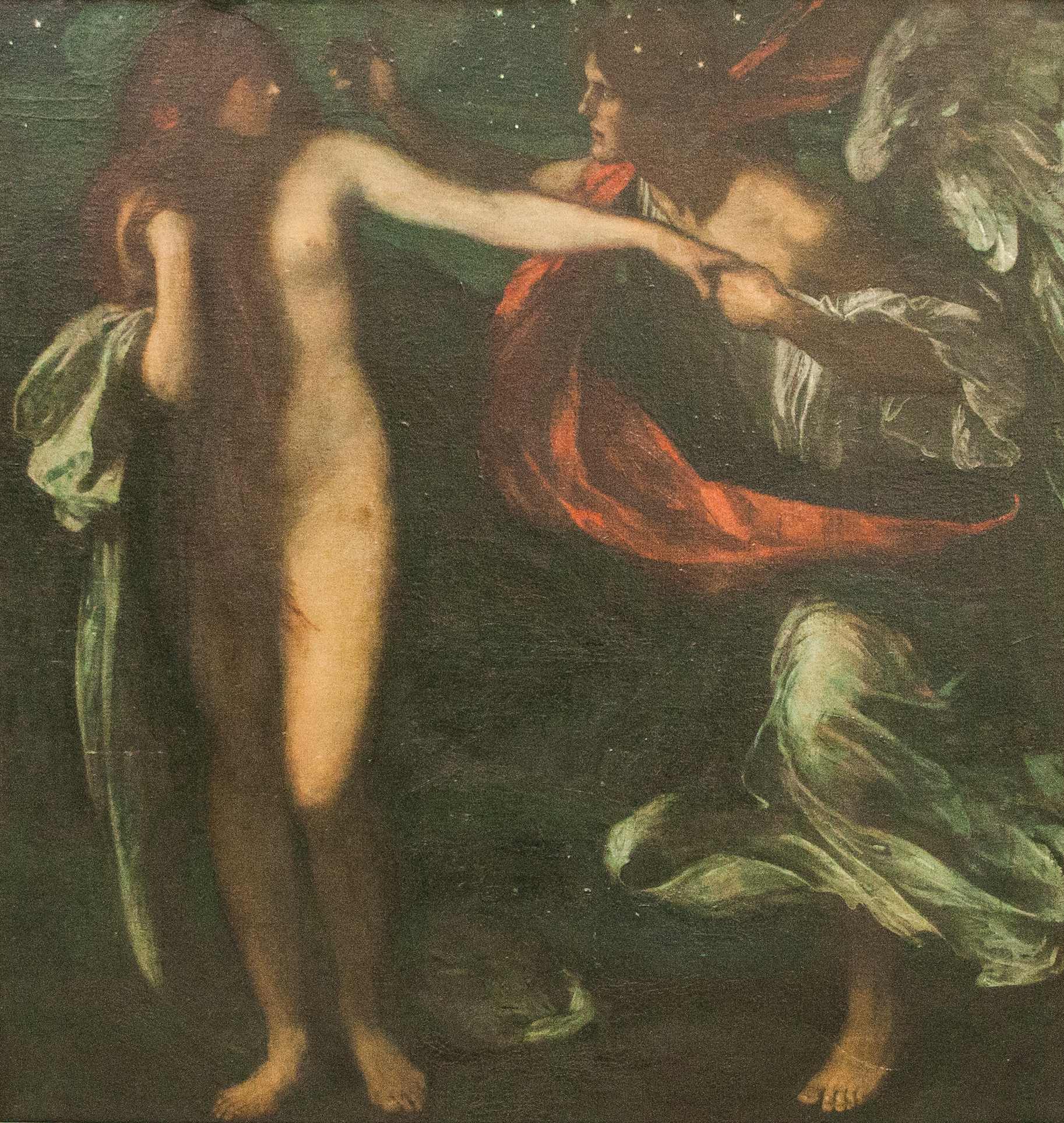
"The sons of God saw the Daughters of Men that they were fair" (Maurice Greiffenhagen), 1909, Museum of Fine Arts Ghent.

== Hebrew Bible ==
In the early writings of the Hebrew Bible, both bene elohim (Hebrew: בְנֵי־הָאֱלֹהִים, romanized: Bənē hāʾĔlōhīm, lit. 'the Sons of Gods') as well as the malak (Hebrew: מַלְאָךְ, romanized: mal’āḵ, lit. 'messenger') are aspects of God. In the earliest records, the Bənē hāʾĔlōhīm are in heaven. They are depicted as the heavenly court or the pantheon of religious belief-system of their time.

The phrase is a possible survival of Hebrew Polytheism, in which the Elohists refer to the Divine in a plural (ʾĔlōhīm). In the Pentateuch, the Bənē hāʾĔlōhīm form the Divine council, comparable to the "sons of God" in Canaanite religion. In the latter, the "sons" are gods or manifestations of the Divine.

As such, the Bənē hāʾĔlōhīm reflected the transcendent aspect of the Divine, but became progressively differentiated from the good aspect of God when the Hebrew religion shifted towards monotheism. In contrast to the mal’āḵ, the Bənē hāʾĔlōhīm do not express a mediator between God and humanity. The fusion of the Bənē hāʾĔlōhīm with the mal’āḵ is evident in the Book of Job. Here, Satan is both one of the Bənē hāʾĔlōhīm in the heavenly court, as well as a mal’āḵ expressing God's interaction with humanity.

=== Book of Genesis ===
The "Sons of God" are mentioned in the Hebrew Bible at Genesis 6:1–4.

^{1} And it came to pass, when men began to multiply on the face of the earth, and daughters were born unto them,^{2} That the sons of God saw the daughters of men that they were fair; and they took them wives of all which they chose.^{3} And the LORD said, My spirit shall not always strive with man, for that he also is flesh: yet his days shall be an hundred and twenty years.^{4} There were giants in the earth in those days; and also after that, when the sons of God came in unto the daughters of men, and they bare children to them, the same became mighty men which were of old, men of renown.

— Genesis 6:1–4, KJV

The Book of Genesis tells that the "Sons of God" lusted after the daughters of men and begot a race of giants (Nephilim). These offspring were identified with "the heroes of old, men of renown." Then, God sent the deluge to purge the earth of these giants.

The Book of Psalms refers to God delivering judgement among the gods and causes them to fall for their sins, as God declares that "Gods you may be, sons you all of the Most High, yet you shall die as men die; princes fall, every one of them, and so shall you.". However, there is no indication what the sin was and the Psalms are at least five hundred years after Genesis was composed, thus written in a different intellectual context. Yet, both refer to the existence of a pantheon and that some of its members sinned. During the Apocalyptic period, these ideas were developed further.

According to Chris Seeman Genesis 6:1–4 depicts literal sexual unions between divine beings and human women, a narrative motif with potential origins in Mesopotamian or Greek mythologies, that was incorporated into Yahwist (J) primeval cosmology.

Ronald Hendel similarly interprets the passage as a lost mythic tradition. In Hendel's analysis, the "sons of the gods" were originally divine beings rather than Sethites or rulers, and the Gibborim of verse 4 are demigod offspring identical to the Nephilim. He argues this intermixing caused cosmic imbalance by crossing human-divine boundaries, making Yahweh restrict human life, preventing the hybrids from full divine status or immortality. Hendel identifies parallels with the Hesiodic traditions, where Zeus uses a deluge to wipe out demigods and end divine-human intermingling. Another is the pre-flood Mesopotamian Apkallu. While Hendel says 1 Enoch expands on Genesis 6, Seeman believes that both are drawing from the same underlying tradition. David Clines also identifies them as celestial beings, but ties the reference to the entire Genesis 1-11 framework. Clines demonstrates that this breach of boundaries between heaven and earth is the climax, representing the final culmination of sin and cosmic disorder which results in the flood.

==== Ugaritic text ====
Claus Westermann claims that the text of Genesis 6 is based on an Ugaritic urtext. In Ugaritic, a cognate phrase is bn 'il. This may occur in the Ugaritic Baal Cycle.

- KTU² 1.40 demonstrates the use of bn il to mean "sons of gods".
- KTU² 1.65 (which may be a scribal exercise) uses bn il three times in succession: il bn il / dr bn il / mphrt bn il "El, the sons of gods, the circle of the sons of gods / the totality of the sons of gods."

The phrase bn ilm ("sons of the gods") is also attested in Ugaritic texts, as is the phrase phr bn ilm ("assembly of the sons of the gods").

Elsewhere in the Ugarit corpus it is suggested that the bn ilm were the 70 sons of Asherah and El, who were the titulary deities of the people of the known world, and their "hieros gamos" marriage with the daughters of men gave rise to their rulers. There is evidence in 2 Samuel 7 that this may have been the case also in Israel.

Simon B. Parker highlights the linguistic and comparative context of the phrase bene ha-elohim. He notes that it is a Semitic idiom where "sons of -" denotes being in membership and within the same category, thus the phrase refers to a group of divine beings (elohim). This expression is found in Northwest Semitic mythology in the Ugaritic texts (KTU² 1.62:7, KTU² 1.23, KTU² 1.17, KTU² 1.10) like the Tale of Aqhat, where the bn il are the sons of El, an assembly of minor deities within a pantheon associated with stars. Parker considers that post-exilic and 2nd Temple period monotheism demoted these beings into subordinate angels, while the older context reflects myths of human women mixing with minor gods to create heroic beings, seen in the Epic of Gilgamesh and Hattic myth of Illuyanka.

==== Late text ====
Josef Scharbert associates Genesis 6:1–4 with the Priestly source and the final redaction of the Pentateuch. On this basis, he assigns the text to later editorial activity. Rüdiger Bartelmus sees only Genesis 6:3 as a late insertion.

Józef Milik and Matthew Black advanced the view of a late text addition to a text dependent on post-exilic, non-canonical tradition, such as the legend of the Watchers from the pseudepigraphic version of the Book of Enoch.

==== Translations ====
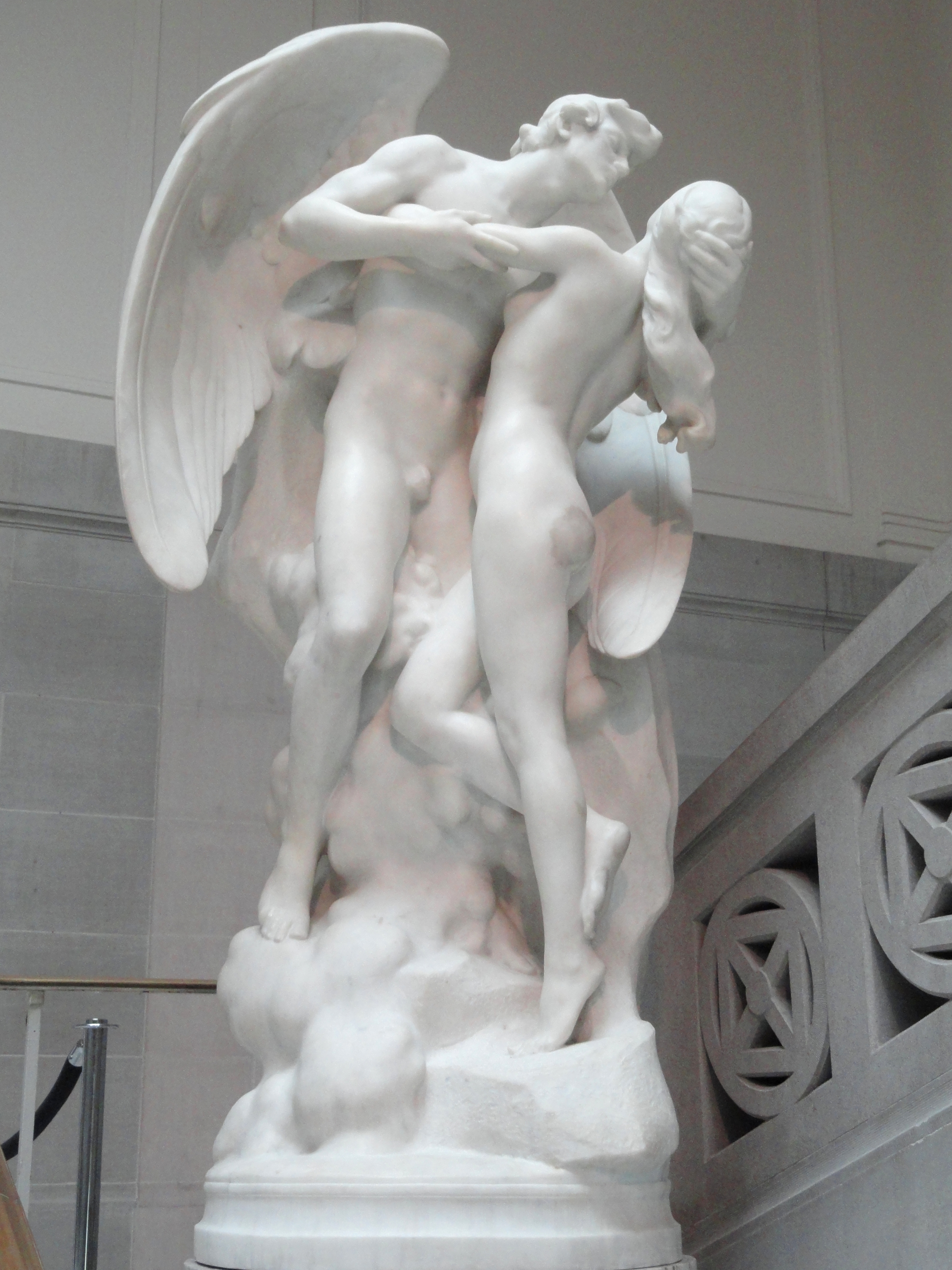
"The Sons of God Saw the Daughters of Men That They Were Fair" (Daniel Chester French, 1923). This sculpture depicts the sons of God as winged angels.

Different source versions of Genesis 6:1–4 vary in their use of "sons of God". Some manuscripts of the Septuagint have emendations to read "sons of God" as "angels". Codex Vaticanus contains "angels" originally. In Codex Alexandrinus "sons of God" has been omitted and replaced by "angels". This reading of Angels is further confirmed by Augustine in his work City of God where he speaks of both variants in book 15 chapter 23. The Peshitta reads "sons of God". Furthermore the Vulgate goes for the literal filii Dei meaning Sons of God. Most modern translations of Christian bibles retain this whereas Jewish ones tend to deviate to such as Sons of Rulers which may in part be due to Shimon bar Yochai who cursed anyone who translated this as "Sons of God" (Genesis Rabbah 26:7).

Beyond this in both the Codices Job 1:6 and Deuteronomy 32:8 when the phrase "angels of God" is used in place of where the Hebrew says "sons of God". For the verse in Deuteronomy the Masoretic Text does not say "sons of God" but "sons of Israel", however in 4Q37 the term "sons of God" is used. This is probably the root reading for the reading we see in the Septuagint. Chrissy M. Hansen argues that the lost Septuagint's original transmission was likely "sons of God", which was also the version used by several medieval theologians in Latin (filiorum dei).

=== Other mentions ===
The phrase "sons of the Elohim" also occurs in:

- Job 1:6 bənê hāʼĕlōhîm (בְּנֵי הָאֱלֹהִים) the sons of Elohim.
- Job 2:1 bənê hāʼĕlōhîm (בְּנֵי הָאֱלֹהִים) the sons of Elohim.
- Job 38:7 bənê ĕlōhîm (בְּנֵי אֱלֹהִֽים) without the definite article - sons of Elohim.
- Deuteronomy 32:8 both bənê hāʼĕlōhîm (בְּנֵי הָאֱלֹהִים) and bənê ĕl (בני אל) the sons of Elohim or sons of El in two Dead Sea Scrolls (4QDtj and 4QDtq); mostly "angels of God" (αγγελων θεου) in the LXX (sometimes "sons of God" or "sons of Israel"); "sons of Israel" in the MT.

Closely related phrases include:

- Psalms 29:1 bənê ēlîm (בְּנֵי אֵלִים) without the definite article - sons of elim (a similar expression).
- Psalms 82:6 bənê elîon (בְּנֵי עֶלְיוֹן) without the definite article and using ‘Most high’ instead of ēl.
- Psalms 89:6 bənê ēlîm (בְּנֵי אֵלִים) - sons of elim
- A closely related Aramaic expression occurs in Daniel 3:25: bar elahin - בַר אֱלָהִֽין - son of gods.

== Second Temple Judaism (c. 500 BCE – 70 CE) ==
The Book of Enoch, the Enochic Book of Giants, and the Book of Jubilees refer to the Watchers who are paralleled to the "sons of God" in Genesis 6. The Epistle of Barnabas is considered by some to acknowledge the Enochian version.

== Interpretation ==
=== Judaism ===
That the "sons of God" were separate enough from the "daughters of men" that they warranted such a distinction, has spawned millennia's worth of debate regarding the meaning of the term. Historically, in Jewish thought, this passage has had many interpretations:

1. Angels: All of the earliest sources interpret the Genesis 6:2 "sons of God" as supernatural beings and angels. From the 3rd century BCE onwards, references are found in the Enochic literature, the Dead Sea Scrolls (the Genesis Apocryphon, the Damascus Document, 4Q180), Jubilees, the Testament of Reuben, 2 Baruch, Josephus, and the Epistle of Jude (compare with 1 Peter 3, 2 Peter 2, 1 Corinthians 11). This is also the meaning of the only two identical occurrences of bene ha elohim in the Hebrew Bible (Job 1:6 and Job 2:1, and possibly Deuteronomy 32:8), and of the most closely related expressions (refer to the list above). In the Septuagint, the interpretive reading "angels" is found in Codex Alexandrinus, one of four main witnesses to the Greek text. The giant offspring of these angels and humans are seen in Numbers 13, Jubilees 20, 3 Baruch, Sirach 16, and Testament of Naftali.
2. Deified kings: There is also a view posited that the "sons of God" were simply the deified kings of the various Canaanite city-states and ruling aristocrats. These would be the same Canaanite city-states that the later proto-Israelites would eventually flee, before resettling in the Judean highlands.
3. Offspring of Seth: The first references to the offspring of Seth rebelling from God and mingling with the daughters of Cain are found in Christian and rabbinic literature from the 2nd century CE onwards, e.g. Rabbi Shimon bar Yochai, Origen, Augustine of Hippo, Julius Africanus, and the Letters attributed to St. Clement. In teachings of contemporary Judaism, "Sons of God" usually refers to the righteous, i.e. the children of Seth. It is also the view expressed in the modern canonical Amharic Ethiopian Orthodox Bible implemented by Haille Selassie I in 1954 where Genesis 6:2 is translated as የሴት ልጆች "the children of Seth" (Yosét Lijoch) to match the Orthodox commentary in Andemta.

=== Christian antiquity ===
Christian writers such as Justin Martyr, Tertullian, Eusebius, Clement of Alexandria, Origen, and Commodianus believed that the "sons of God" in Genesis 6:1–4 were fallen angels who engaged in unnatural union with human women, resulting in the begetting of the Nephilim. Some scholars used Jesus' comment in Matthew 22:30 that angels in heaven do not marry, to challenge this view.

Other early Christians believed that the "sons of God" in Genesis 6:1–4 were the descendants of Seth. Augustine of Hippo subscribed to this view, based on the Chronographiai of Julius Africanus in his book City of God, which refer to the "sons of God" as being descendants of Seth (or Sethites), the pure line of Adam. The "daughters of men" are viewed as the descendants of Cain (or Cainites). Variations of this view were also received by Jewish philosophers.

=== Medieval Judaism ===
Traditionalists and philosophers of Judaism in the Middle Ages typically practiced rational theology. They rejected any belief in rebel or fallen angels since evil was considered abstract. Rabbinic sources, most notably the Targum, state that the "sons of God" who married the daughters of men were merely human beings of exalted social station. They have also been considered as pagan royalty or members of nobility who, out of lust, married women from the general population. Other variations of this interpretation define these "sons of God" as tyrannical ancient Near Eastern kings who were honored as divine rulers, engaging in polygamous behavior. No matter the variation in views, the primary concept by Jewish rationalists is that the "sons of God" were ultimately of human origin.

Most notable Jewish writers in support for the view of human "sons of God" were Saadia, Rashi, Lekah Tob, Midrash Aggada, Joseph Bekor Shor, Abraham ibn Ezra, Maimonides, David Kimhi, Nachmanides, Hizkuni, Bahya Ashur, Gersonides, Shimeon ben Yochai, and Hillel ben Samuel.

Ibn Ezra reasoned that the "sons of God" were men who possessed divine power, by means of astrological knowledge, able to beget children of unusual size and strength.

Jewish commentator Isaac Abrabanel considered the aggadot on Genesis 6 to have referred to some secret doctrine and was not to be taken literally. Abrabanel later joined Nahmanides and Levi ben Gerson in promoting the concept that the "sons of God" were the older generations who were closer to physical perfection, as Adam and Eve were perfect. Though there are variations of this view, the primary idea was that Adam and Eve's perfect attributes were passed down from generation to generation. However, as each generation passed, their perfect physical attributes diminished. Thus, the early generations were mightier than the succeeding ones. The physical decline of the younger generations continued until the Flood, to the point that their days were numbered as stated in Genesis 6:3. It was immoral for the older generations to consort with the younger generations, whereby puny women begot unusually large children. Nephilim was even considered a stature.

Jacob Anatoli and Isaac Arama viewed the groups and events in Genesis 6:1–4 as an allegory, primarily for the sin of lust that debased man's higher nature.

== See also ==
- Angel of the Lord
- Anunnaki
- Archangel
- Devaputra
- List of angels in theology
