= Anakim =

Possible race mentioned in the bible

Anakim (Hebrew: עֲנָקִים ʿĂnāqīm) are mentioned in the Bible as descendants of Anak.

According to the Old Testament, the Anakim lived in the southern part of the land of Canaan, near Hebron (Gen. 23:2; Josh. 15:13). Genesis 14:5–6 states that they inhabited the region later known as Edom and Moab in the days of Abraham. The name may come from a Hebrew root meaning "necklace" or "neck-chain". They were also a Rephaite tribe according to Deuteronomy 2:11.

Their formidable appearance, as described by ten of the twelve spies sent to search the land, filled the Israelites with terror. The Israelites seem to have identified them with the Nephilim of the antediluvian age (Genesis 6:4, Numbers 13:33). However, the two faithful spies Caleb and Joshua do not verify this report, leading some scholars to believe that the fearful reports from the other ten are hyperbolic and should not be taken literally.

Joshua finally expelled the Anakim from the land, except for some who found a refuge in the Philistine cities of Gaza, Gath, and Ashdod (Joshua 11:22). Thus, some scholars conclude that the Philistine giants such as Goliath whom David encountered (2 Samuel 21:15–22) were descendants of the Anakim.

The Septuagint translation of Jeremiah 47:5 refers to the descendants of the Anakim mourning after the destruction of Gaza.

The Egyptian Execration texts of the Middle Kingdom (c. 2055–1650 BC) mention a list of political enemies in Canaan, and among this list are a group called the "ly Anaq" or people of Anaq. The three rulers of ly Anaq were Erum, Abiyamimu, and Akirum. It has also been argued that the Anakim are attested in the Ugaritic texts.

== See also ==
- Gibborim
- Nephilim
