= Gibborim =

Gibborim (sing. Gibbor) may refer to:

- Gibborim (biblical), a Hebrew word for mighty beings
  - David's Mighty Warriors, a military unit in the Hebrew Bible
- Gibborim (comics), deities in the Marvel Universe
