= Midrash Aggadah =

Midrash Aggadah is an exegetical Midrash on the Pentateuch that was found in a unique manuscript by Solomon Buber in Aleppo, Syria, where it was purchased by certain Mr. Huntington. The manuscript is dated to around 1020–1220 CE, and it was first published by Buber in 1894.

The original manuscript was an anonymous text that was missing several parts. It is associated with Rabbi Moses ha-Darshan who lived in Provence, France. The expression 'Midrash Aggadah' is also often used in a general sense as a type of Jewish Aggadah that is found in the Midrash writings, which can create some confusion. These types of Midrash writings are also known as Aggadic midrashim.

Some very old biblical traditions are found in Midrash Aggadah. According to Bar-Ilan (2016), the compiler of this midrash "had access to old traditions that are unknown elsewhere". In particular, it preserves some unusual details from the episode of biblical patriarch Joseph's trial after he was accused by Potiphar's wife; similar details are evident also in Sefer Ha-Yashar, in Midrash Abkir, as well as in the Quran.

Midrash Aggadah uses Pirkei De-Rabbi Eliezer (eighth century) as one of its sources, and even names the book as such.

== See also ==
- Aggadah

== Bibliography ==
- Salomon Buber, Midrash Aggadah on the Torah: Genesis-Exodus (Vienna: A. Fante, 1894)
- Midrash Aggadah, ed. Buber: Agadischer Commentar zum Pentateuch nach einer Handschrift aus Aleppo, ed. S. Buber (Vienna, 1894)
- Martha Himmelfarb, Between Temple and Torah (Tübingen: Mohr Siebeck, 2013), 329–49, 351–58.
- Mack, Hananel. 2010. The Mystery of Rabbi Moshe Hadarshan. Jerusalem: Bialik Institute. [Hebrew]
