= Bible translations into Amharic =

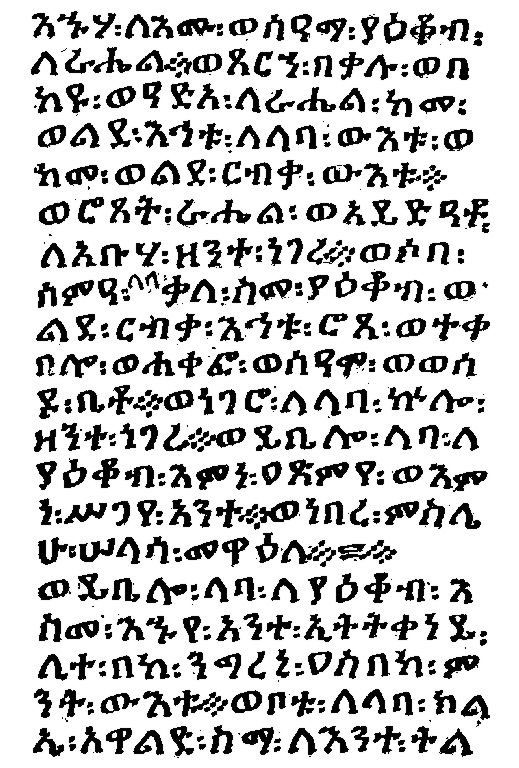
A portion of the Octateuch in Geʽez, containing Genesis 29:11–16

Although Christianity became the state religion of Ethiopia in the 4th century, and the Bible was first translated into Geʽez at about that time, only in the last two centuries have Bible translations appeared in Amharic.

== Abu Rumi translation ==
The first translation of the Bible into Amharic was by Abu Rumi in the early 19th century. In the opinion of Edward Ullendorff, "The hisouis Asselin de Cherville, possessed a manuscript containing a complete translation of the Bible into Amharic, created by the mutual efforts of the Consul and Abu Rumi." As Ullendorff relates, for ten years "every Tuesday and Saturday his de Cherville's door was shut to all visitors when he read with 'my Abyssinian, slowly and with the utmost attention, every verse of the Sacred Volume, in the Arabic Version which we were able to translate.' But we are not told from which Arabic version the rendering was made." Where the Arabic words were "abstruse, difficult, or foreign", de Cherville then consulted "the Hebrew Original, the Syriac Version, or the Septuagint" for clarification.

William Jowett purchased de Cherville's manuscript, consisting of 9,539 pages written in "the fine hand" of Abu Rumi for £1,250, which he then presented for review to Professor Samuel Lee, and the final manuscript was printed by Thomas Pell Platt in increasing portions: the four Gospels in 1824, the entire New Testament in 1829, and the complete Bible in 1840. This translation, "with some changes and amendments, held sway until the Emperor Haile Selassie I ordered a new translation", which was published in 1960/61.

== First Haile Selassie I Bible (1935) ==
A new translation was underway, under the Emperor Haile Selassie I's patronage, when the Italian army invaded. This manuscript was later sent to Britain and printed, but most of the copies were destroyed in a fire during the bombing of London. This translation is sometimes known as the "Buxton" translation, because a British missionary named Alfred Buxton (1891–1940) was instrumental in sending the manuscript from occupied Ethiopia to Britain. This same basic translation, with some changes, was later printed in the USA, with funds raised by Rev. Donald Barnhouse. After it was printed, this translation (sometimes referred to as the "Barnhouse New Testament") was found to contain a serious error in Rev. 19:10 & 22:9 (an angel commanding John to worship him, rather than prohibiting John to worship him), so most copies were destroyed.

== New Haile Selassie I Bible (1962) ==
In 1962, a new Amharic translation from Geʽez was printed, again with the patronage of the Emperor. The preface by Emperor Haile Selassie I is dated "1955" (E.C.), and the 31st year of his reign (i.e. AD 1962 in the Gregorian Calendar), and states that it was translated by the Bible Committee he convened between AD 1947 and 1952, "realizing that there ought to be a revision from the original Hebrew and Greek of the existing translation of the Bible". It included the 66 books of the protocanon (i.e. those held canonical in common with Protestant and Catholic Christians), as the 5 narrow canon deuterocanonical books were published separately. The five narrow canon Ethiopian deuterocanonical books comprise 1 Enoch (Henok; different from the standard editions of Geʽez manuscripts A~Q by foreign academics), Jubilees (Geʽez: Mets'hafe Kufale) and I, II, and III Meqabyan (completely different from I, II, and III Maccabees)

The 81 book Ethiopian Orthodox Tewahedo Church Bible, including the deuterocanonicals, 46 books of the Old Testament and 35 books of the New Testament, was published in 1986. This version incorporates a few minor changes or corrections to the 1962 Amharic text of the New Testament, but the text of the Old Testament and Deuterocanon are identical to those previously published under Haile Selassie I.

== UBS Versions (1987, 2005) ==
Under the Bible Society of Ethiopia (a member of the United Bible Societies), a new translation was printed in 1987, translated directly from Hebrew and Greek. A revised version of this appeared in 2005. These versions contain only the 66 books of the Protestant canon, and they have not been widely embraced by the Ethiopian Orthodox Tewahedo Church.

== IBS Version (2001) ==
Living Bibles International produced a New Testament in 1985. Following the 1992 merger of LBI with IBS, the International Bible Society produced a complete Bible in 2001. This is a translation from the English NIV, or is at least very heavily reliant upon it.

== Biblica Version (2001) ==
The Biblica translation of the Bible is for the Amharic language, which is primarily used in Ethiopia. This translation uses an informal language style and applies a meaning-based translation philosophy. It is translated from the biblical languages. The Old Testament was completed in 2001 and the New Testament in 1988.

== New World Translation of Holy Scriptures ==
In 2008, the Watch Tower Society produced an Amharic translation of Jehovah's Witnesses New World Translation of the Holy Scriptures.

== Millennium Amharic Bible ==
For the millennium celebration on the Ethiopian calendar, the Ethiopian Orthodox Church and the Ethiopian Bible Society produced a new translation. This translation differed from recent Amharic translations in that the translators generally followed the Greek Septuagint (LXX) translation for the Old Testament and the Geʽez for both the Old and the New. It was warmly welcomed by the Orthodox, but not by Protestants, both sides misunderstanding some points of history and the Biblical canon.

== See also ==
- Orthodox Tewahedo biblical canon
