= Robert Charles (scholar) =

Irish Anglican theologian

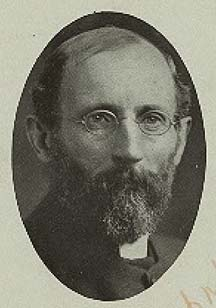
Portrait of R. H. Charles

Robert Henry (R. H.) Charles, FBA (Cookstown, 6 August 1855 – Westminster, 30 January 1931) was an Irish Anglican theologian, biblical scholar, professor, and translator from Northern Ireland. He is known particularly for his English translations of numerous apocryphal and pseudepigraphal Ancient Hebrew writings, including the Book of Jubilees (1895), the Apocalypse of Baruch (also known as 2 Baruch) (1896), the Ascension of Isaiah (1900), the Book of Enoch (1906), and the Testaments of the Twelve Patriarchs (1908). He wrote the articles in the eleventh edition of Encyclopædia Britannica (1911) attributed to the initials "R. H. C." He specialized in Ancient Judaism and Second Temple Judaism, and emphasized the importance of such pseudepigraphal writings for the era's Jews, despite the lack of emphasis on them in later Rabbinic Judaism.

He was born in Cookstown, County Tyrone, on 6 August 1855 and educated at the Belfast Academy, Queen's College, Belfast, and Trinity College, Dublin, with periods in Imperial Germany and Switzerland. He gained a D.D. and became Professor of Biblical Greek at Trinity College. In 1906, he was elected Fellow of the British Academy and four years later he was appointed Fellow of Merton College, Oxford.

He also became Archdeacon of Westminster in 1919, serving until his death in 1931. He is buried in Westminster Abbey.

== Select bibliography ==
- The Book of Enoch, Oxford: Clarendon, 1893, reprinted in 1895. Republished by Boston, MA: Samuel Weiser; 2003. ISBN 1-57863-259-5
- The Ethiopic Version of the Hebrew Book of Jubilees, Oxford: Clarendon, 1895.
- The Apocalypse of Baruch, London: Black, 1896.
- Charles, Robert Henry, ed. (1896). The Book Of The Secrets Of Enoch. Translated by Morfill, William Richard. Oxford: Clarendon Press.
- The Assumption of Moses, London: Black, 1897.
- A Critical History of the Doctrine of a Future Life, London: Black, 1899. 1999 reprint of 2nd edition
- Ascension of Isaiah, London: Black, 1900.
- The Book of Jubilees or the Little Genesis, London: Black, 1902.
- Encyclopaedia Biblica (contributor), 1903
- The Ethiopic Version of Book of Enoch, Oxford: Clarendon, 1906.
- The Greek Versions of the Testaments of the Twelve Patriarchs, Oxford: Clarendon, 1908.
- trans. The Testaments of the Twelve Patriarchs), London: Adam and Charles Black, 1908.
- The Book of Enoch or 1 Enoch: Translated from the Editor's Ethiopic Text, Oxford: Clarendon, 1912.
- Fragments of a Zadokite Work. Translated from the Cambridge Hebrew Text and edited with Introduction, Notes, and Indexes, Oxford: Clarendon Press, 1912.
- Studies in the Apocalypse, Edinburgh: T. & T. Clark, 1913.
- Eschatology: The Doctrine of a Future Life in Israel, Judaism and Christianity, London: Black, 1913 (rpt. New York: Schocken 1963 with an introduction by G. W. Buchanan).
- ed. The Apocrypha and Pseudepigrapha of the Old Testament, 2 vols.; Oxford: Clarendon, 1913. Republished in 1976. ISBN 0-19-826155-1, vol. 1,vol. 2
- Religious Development Between the Old and the New Testaments, William and Norgate, 1914. Republished in 1925.
- Charles, Robert H. (2007) [1916]. The Chronicle of John, Bishop of Nikiu: Translated from Zotenberg's Ethiopic Text. Merchantville, NJ: Evolution Publishing. ISBN 9781889758879.
- Lectures on the Apocalypse, Schweich Lecture for 1919.
- A Critical and Exegetical Commentary on the Revelation of St. John, 2 vols., Edinburgh: Clark, 1920.
- The Teaching of the New Testament on Divorce, London: Williams & Norgate, 1921
- A Critical and Exegetical Commentary on the Book of Daniel, Oxford: Clarendon, 1929.
