= The Twelve Spies =

Group of Israelite chieftains

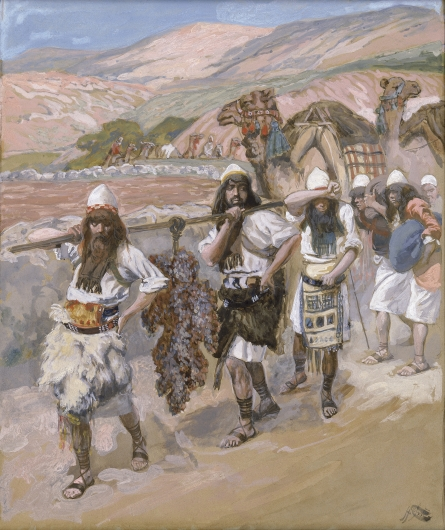
The Grapes of Canaan by James Tissot. Although the spies brought back a cluster of grapes so large that it took two men to carry it (Numbers 13:23), only two of the twelve brought back a good report of the land.

The Twelve Spies, as recorded in the Book of Numbers, were a group of Israelite chieftains, one from each of the Twelve Tribes, who were dispatched by Moses to scout out the Land of Canaan for 40 days as a future home for the Israelite people, during the time when the Israelites were in the wilderness following their Exodus from Ancient Egypt. The account is found in Numbers 13:1–33, and is repeated with some differences in Deuteronomy 1:22–40.

God had promised Abraham that there would be a Promised Land for the nations to come out of his son, Isaac. The land of Canaan that the spies were to explore was the same Promised Land. Moses asked for an assessment of the geographic features of the land, the strength and numbers of the population, the agricultural potential and actual performance of the land, civic organization (whether their cities were like camps or strongholds), and forestry conditions. He also asked them to be positive in their outlook and to return with samples of local produce.

When ten of the twelve spies showed little faith in the negative reports they gave about the land, they were slandering what they believed God had promised them. They did not believe that God could help them, and the people as a whole were persuaded that it was not possible to take the land. As a result, the entire nation was made to wander in the desert for 40 years, until almost the entire generation of men had died. Joshua and Caleb were the two spies who brought back a good report and believed that God would help them succeed. They were the only men from their generation that entered the Promised Land after the time of wandering.

== About the spies ==
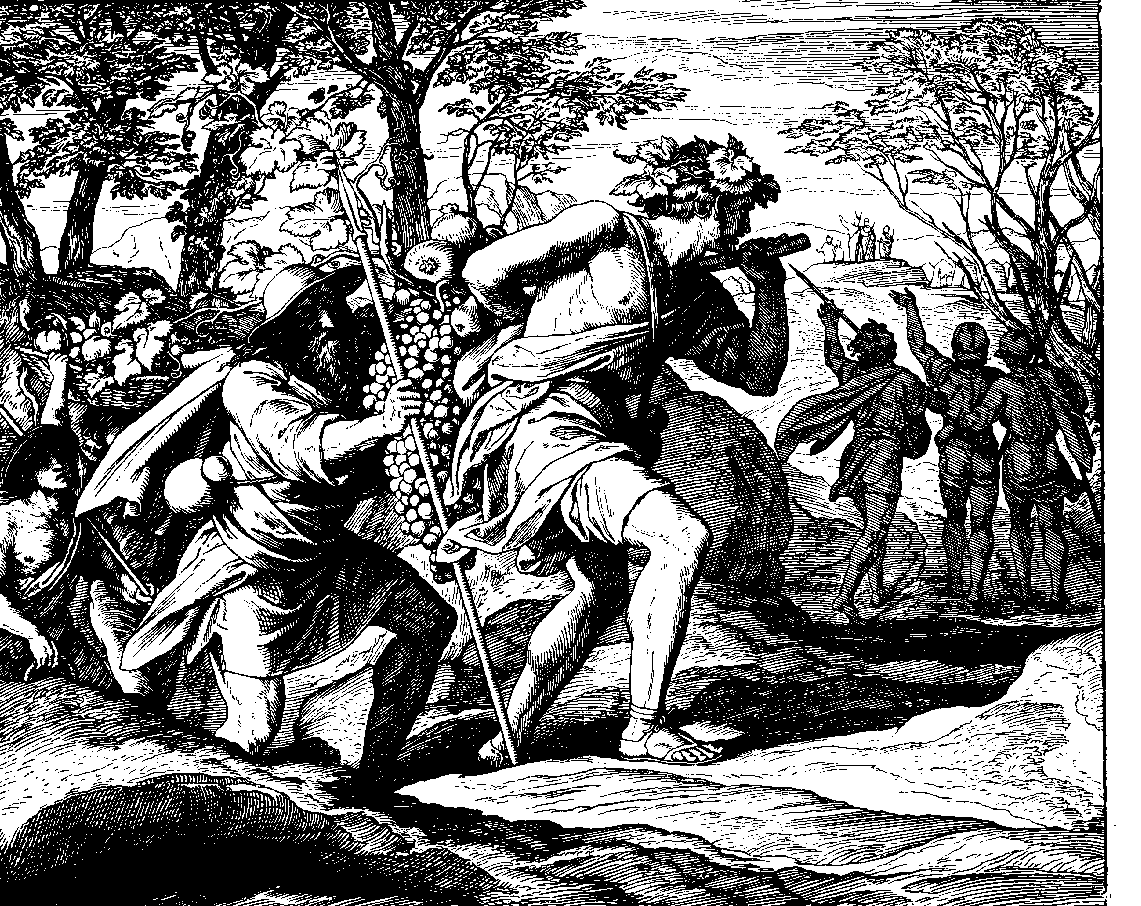
Return of the Spies, 1860 woodcut by Julius Schnorr von Karolsfeld

God had promised the Israelites that they would be able to conquer the land with its indigenous Canaanite nations. Moses instructed the spies to report back on the agriculture and lay of the land. However, during their tour, the spies saw fortified cities and resident giants, which frightened them and led them to believe that the Israelites would not be able to conquer the land as God had promised. Ten of the spies decided to bring back an unbalanced report, emphasizing the difficulty of the task before them.

They gave Moses this account, "We went into the land to which you sent us, and it does flow with milk and honey! Here is its fruit. But the people who live there are very powerful, and the cities are fortified and very large. We even saw descendants of Anak there."

— Numbers, 13:27-28

Two of the spies — Joshua and Caleb — did not go along with the majority and tried to convince the Israelites that they could conquer the land:

Then Caleb silenced the people before Moses and said, "We should go up and take possession of the land, for we can certainly do it."

— Numbers, 13:30

However, the Israelite community believed the majority's conclusions. All of the spies, except Joshua and Caleb, were struck down with a plague and died.

Joshua was at first a fierce warrior. He was chosen as the representative from his tribe, Ephraim, to explore the land of Canaan, and was in agreement with Caleb that the Promised Land could be conquered. After the incident with the 12 spies, Joshua lived through the 40 year wandering period, and was named successor to Moses as instructed by God. Joshua completed the task of leading the Israelites into the Promised Land and of taking possession of it. Joshua also was the leader in renewing the Mosaic covenant with their God.

Caleb was from the tribe of Judah. He was also chosen to explore the land of Canaan, and he was (along with Joshua) the other man who said that the God of Israel could help the Israelite people to victory against the Canaanites. God promised Caleb and Joshua that they would receive the land which they had explored for themselves and their descendants. Caleb was also told that he would live to go into the Promised Land.

The names of the twelve spies were:

1. Shammua, son of Zaccur, from the tribe of Reuben
2. Shaphat, son of Hori, from the tribe of Simeon
3. Caleb, son of Jephunneh, from the tribe of Judah
4. Igal, son of Joseph, from the tribe of Issachar
5. Hoshea (Joshua), son of Nun, from the tribe of Ephraim
6. Palti, son of Raphu, from the tribe of Benjamin
7. Gaddiel, son of Sodi, from the tribe of Zebulun
8. Gaddi, son of Susi, from the tribe of Manasseh
9. Ammiel, son of Gemalli, from the tribe of Dan
10. Sethur, son of Michael, from the tribe of Asher
11. Nahbi, son of Vophsi, from the tribe of Naphtali
12. Geuel, son of Maki, from the tribe of Gad

== Consequences ==
The Israelites' belief of the false report amounted to the acceptance of lashon hara (lit." "evil tongue" / "slander" in Hebrew) against Canaan.

But the men who had gone up with him said, "We can't attack those people; they are stronger than we are." And they spread a bad report about the land they had explored. They said, "The land we explored devours those living in it. All the people we saw there were of great size. We saw the Nephilim there (the descendants of Anak come from the Nephilim). We seemed like grasshoppers in our own eyes, and we looked the same to them."

— Numbers, 13:31-33

This was considered a grave sin by God. Corresponding to the 40 days that the spies toured the land, God decreed that the Israelites would wander in the wilderness for 40 years as a result of their unwillingness to take the land. Moreover, the entire generation of men who left Egypt during the Exodus would die in the desert, save for Joshua and Caleb who did not slander the land.

For 40 years, the Israelites wandered in the wilderness, eating quail and manna. They were led into the Promised Land by Joshua; the victory at Jericho marked the beginning of possession of the land. As victories were won, the tracts of land were assigned to each tribe, and they lived peacefully with each other. God brought victories where needed, and his promise to Abraham was fulfilled.

== Tisha B'Av ==
According to Rabbinic tradition (as seen in the Mishnah Taanit 4:6), the sin of the spies produced the annual fast day of Tisha B'Av. When the Israelites accepted the false report, they wept over the false belief that God was setting them up for defeat. The night that the people cried was the ninth of Av, which became a day of weeping and misfortune for all time.

Rashi, commenting on Numbers 13:25, notes that the journey was shortened by God, as God foresaw their downfall and subsequent proportionate punishment (1 day equaling 1 year).
