= Gibborim (biblical) =

Hebrew word for "mighty" beings

Gibborim (Hebrew: גִּבֹּרִ֛ים, romanized: gībbōrīm, singular גִּבֹּר gībbor) is a Hebrew word that can be glossed "mightiest" and is an intensive form of the word for "man" (גֶּבֶר geḇer), as well as "mighty men" or "warriors". In the Hebrew Bible, it is used to describe people who are valiant, mighty, or of great stature. There is some confusion about the Gibborim as a class of beings because of its use in the Genesis flood narrative in Genesis 6:4, which describes the Nephilim as mighty (gibborim).

The word gibborim is used in the Tanakh over 150 times and applied to men as well as lions (Proverbs 30:30), hunters like Nimrod (Genesis 10:9), soldiers (Jeremiah 51:30) and leaders (Daniel 11:3). The word is also applied to David's Mighty Warriors, a group of 37 men who fought with King David in 2 Samuel 23:8–38.

In Modern Hebrew, the word gibbor (גִּבּוֹר) equates with the English word "hero" as a noun or brave as an adjective. In the Septuagint, translation of Gen 6:5 and Gen 10:8, γίγαντες is used meaning Gigantes. The Gibborim can be traced from being "mighty heroes" in ancient Near-Eastern mythologies, into primeval giants in Second Temple period Judaism with Greek parallels, being prominent in 1 Enoch and the Book of Giants.

== Use in ancient contexts ==
In the Bible, the Gibborim are mentioned in relation to the human corps of professional soldiers of King David (2 Sam 10:7; 23:8, 9, 16, 17, 22; 1 Chr 11:11; 12:24). There are also references to Angelic Gibborim in Psalm 103:20, Joel 3:11; Isaiah 13:3, and possibly in Judges 5:23. Daniel 8:24 may also be considered as containing an equivalent to gibborim.

=== Qumran literature ===
In Qumran texts they are violent creatures who upon consuming human resources, turned against and began devouring humans themselves, as well as engaging in cannibalism. After their physical destruction in the global flood, the disembodied spirits of these giants remained on Earth and they became evil spirits. In the Book of Watchers, they are described alongside the Nephilim as the descendants of divine beings and human women.

== In Modern Hebrew ==
In contemporary usage, gibborim is often used to describe heroes or champions. It is a term used to describe individuals who exhibit exceptional strength, courage, and prowess. The word is often associated with sports, where it is used to describe athletes who exhibit exceptional skill and ability.

== See also ==
- Anakim
- Demigod
- Elioud
- God king
- Goliath
- Greek hero cult
- Hero
- King Og
- Rephaim
- Sons of God
- Titanomachy
- Watcher (angel)
