= Book of Jubilees =

Ancient Jewish religious work of 50 chapters

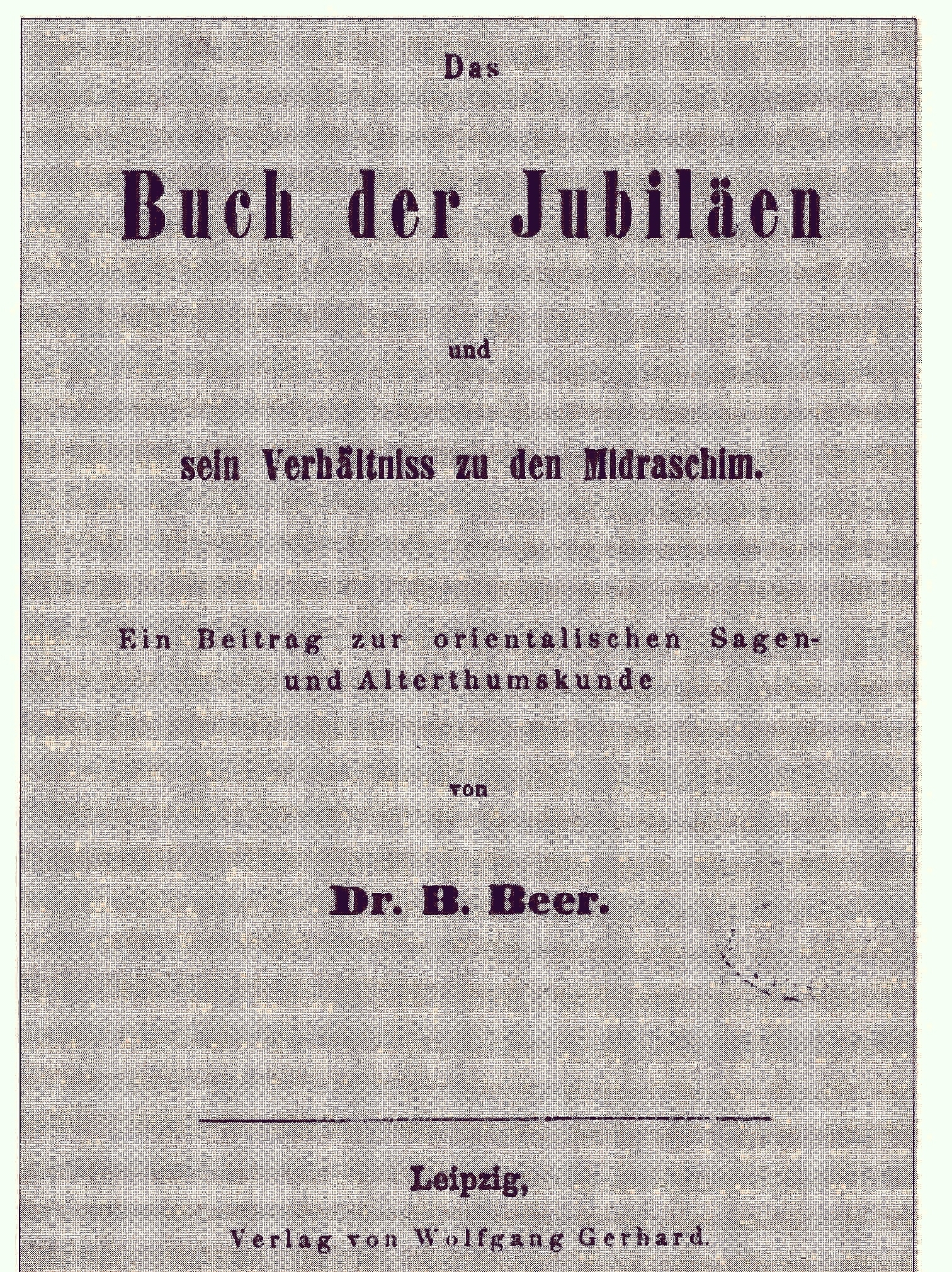
German translation of Jubilees, 1856

The Book of Jubilees (Note: Also known as Lesser Genesis, Leptogenesis, and the Book of Division (Ge'ez: መጽሐፈ ኩፋሌ, romanized: maṣiḥāfa kufale) by Haymanot Judaism, which is observed by members of the Ethiopian Jewish community.) is an ancient Jewish apocryphal text of 50 chapters (1,341 verses), considered canonical by the Ethiopian Orthodox Tewahedo Church, Eritrean Orthodox Tewahedo Church, as well as by Haymanot Judaism, a denomination observed by members of the Ethiopian Jewish community. Jubilees is considered one of the pseudepigrapha by the Eastern Orthodox, Catholic, and Protestant churches. Apart from Haymanot, the book is not considered canonical within any of the denominations of Judaism.

It was well known to early Christians, as evidenced by the writings of Epiphanius, Justin Martyr, Origen, Diodorus of Tarsus, Isidore of Alexandria, Isidore of Seville, Eutychius of Alexandria, John Malalas, George Syncellus, and George Kedrenos. The text was also utilized by the community that collected the Dead Sea Scrolls. No complete Hebrew, Greek or Latin version is known to have survived, but the Geʽez version is considered to be an accurate translation of the fragments in Biblical Hebrew found in the Dead Sea Scrolls.

The Book of Jubilees presents a "history of the division of the days of the law and of the testimony, of the events of the years, of their (year) weeks, of their jubilees throughout all the years of the world, as the Lord spoke to Moses on Mount Sinai when he went up to receive the tables of the law and of the commandment" as revealed to Moses (in addition to the Torah or "Instruction") by angels while he was on Mount Sinai for forty days and forty nights. The chronology given in Jubilees is based on multiples of seven. The jubilee year is the year that follows the passage of seven "weeks of years" (seven cycles of sabbatical years, or 49 total years), into which all of time has been divided.

== Manuscripts ==
Until the discovery of extensive fragments among the Dead Sea Scrolls, the earliest surviving manuscripts of Jubilees were four complete Geʽez texts dating to the 15th and 16th centuries and several quotations by the early Church Fathers such as Epiphanius, Justin Martyr, Origen, Diodorus of Tarsus, Isidore of Alexandria, Augustine of Hippo, Isidore of Seville, Eutychius of Alexandria, John Malalas, George Syncellus, and George Kedrenos. There is also a preserved fragment of a Latin translation of the Greek that contains about a quarter of the whole work.

The Geʽez Biblical texts, now numbering twenty-seven, are the primary basis for translations into English. Passages in the texts of Jubilees that are directly parallel to verses in Genesis do not directly reproduce either of the two surviving manuscript traditions. (Note: "A minute study of the text shows that it attests an independent form of the Hebrew text of Genesis and the early chapters of Exodus. Thus it agrees with individual authorities such as the Samaritan or the LXX, or the Syriac, or the Vulgate, or the Targum of Onkelos against all the rest. Or again it agrees with two or more of these authorities in opposition to the rest, as for instance with the Massoretic and Samaritan against the LXX, Syriac and Vulgate, or with the Massoretic and Onkelos against the Samaritan, LXX, Syriac, and Vulgate, or with the Massoretic, Samaritan and Syriac against the LXX or Vulgate." R.H. Charles, "7. Textual Affinities") Consequently, even before the Qumran discoveries, R. H. Charles had deduced that the Hebrew original had used an otherwise unrecorded text for Genesis and for the early chapters of Exodus, one independent either of the Masoretic Text (𝕸) or of the Hebrew text that was the basis for the Septuagint. According to one historian, the variation among parallel manuscript traditions that are exhibited by the Septuagint compared with the 𝕸, and which are embodied in the further variants among the Dead Sea Scrolls, demonstrates that even canonical Hebrew texts did not possess any single "authorized" manuscript tradition before the Common Era. Others write about the existence of three main textual manuscript traditions (namely the Babylonian, Palestinian and pre-𝕸 "proto" textual traditions). Although the pre-𝕸 text may have indeed been authoritative back then, arguments can be made for and against this concept.

Between 1947 and 1956, approximately fifteen scrolls of Jubilees were found in five caves at Qumran, all written in Biblical Hebrew. The large number of manuscripts (more than for any Biblical books except for Psalms, Deuteronomy, Isaiah, Exodus, and Genesis, in descending order) indicates that Jubilees was widely used at Qumran. A comparison of the Qumran texts with the Geʽez version, performed by James VanderKam, found that the Geʽez was in most respects an accurate and literalistic translation.

== Origins and date ==
R. H. Charles (1855–1931) became the first Biblical scholar to propose an origin for Jubilees. Charles suggested that the author of Jubilees may have been a Pharisee and that Jubilees was the product of the midrashim that had already been worked on in the Books of Chronicles. With the discovery of the Dead Sea Scrolls at Qumran in 1947, Charles' Pharisaic hypothesis of the origin of Jubilees has been almost completely abandoned.

The dating of Jubilees has been problematic for Biblical scholars. While the oldest extant copies of Jubilees can be assigned based on the handwriting to about 100 BCE, there is much evidence to suggest Jubilees was written before this date. Jubilees could not have been written very long prior. Jubilees at 4:17–25 records that Enoch "saw in a vision what has happened and what will occur", and the book contains many points of information otherwise found earliest in the Animal Apocalypse in 1 Enoch, such as Enoch's wife being Edna. The Animal Apocalypse claims to predict the Maccabean Revolt, which occurred 167–160 BCE, and is commonly dated to that time. The direction of dependence has been controversial, but the consensus since 2008 has been that the Animal Apocalypse came first and Jubilees after. As a result, general reference works such as the Oxford Annotated Bible and the Mercer Dictionary of the Bible conclude the work can be dated to 160–150 BCE.

J. Amanda Guire argues that Jubilees was written in c. 170–150 BCE by a Palestinian Jew of "priestly background and Hassidic or Essene persuasion", based on his knowledge of Canaanite geography, biblical festivals, and laws.

== Content ==
Jubilees covers much of the same ground as Genesis, but often with additional detail, and addressing Moses in the second person as the entire history of creation, and of Israel up to that point, is recounted in divisions of 49 years each, or "Jubilees". The elapsed time from the creation, up to Moses receiving the scriptures upon Sinai during the Exodus, is calculated as fifty Jubilees, less the 40 years still to be spent wandering in the desert before entering Canaan – or 2,410 years.

Four classes of angels are mentioned: angels of the presence, angels of sanctifications, guardian angels over individuals, and angels presiding over the phenomena of nature. Enoch was the first man initiated by the angels in the art of writing, and wrote down, accordingly, all the secrets of astronomy, of chronology, and of the world's epochs. As regards demonology, the writer's position is largely that of the deuterocanonical writings from both New and Old Testament times.

The Book of Jubilees narrates the genesis of angels on the first day of Creation and the story of how a group of fallen angels mated with mortal females, giving rise to a race of giants known as the Nephilim, and then to their descendants, the Elioud. The Ethiopian version states that the "angels" were in fact the disobedient offspring of Seth (Deqiqa Set), while the "mortal females" were daughters of Cain. This is also the view held by Clementine literature, Sextus Julius Africanus, Ephrem the Syrian, Augustine of Hippo, and John Chrysostom among many early Christian authorities. Their hybrid children, the Nephilim in existence during the time of Noah, were wiped out by the great flood. Jubilees also states that God granted ten percent of the disembodied spirits of the Nephilim to try to lead mankind astray after the flood.

Jubilees makes an incestuous reference regarding the son of Adam and Eve, Cain, and his wife. In chapter iv (1–12) (Cain and Abel), it mentions that Cain took his sister Awan to be his wife and Enoch (a separate Enoch, and not the author of the Book of 1st Enoch, who was a descendant of Seth) was their child. It also mentions that Seth (another son of Adam and Eve) married his sister Azura.

According to this book, Hebrew is the language of Heaven, and was originally spoken by all creatures in the Garden, animals and man; however, the animals lost their power of speech when Adam and Eve were expelled. Following the Deluge, the earth was apportioned into three divisions for the three sons of Noah, and his sixteen grandsons. After the destruction of the Tower of Babel, their families were scattered to their respective allotments, and Hebrew was forgotten, until Abraham was taught it by the angels.

Jubilees also contains a few scattered allusions to the Messianic kingdom. Robert Henry Charles wrote in 1913:

This kingdom was to be ruled over by a Messiah sprung, not from Levi—that is, from the Maccabean family—as some of his contemporaries expected—but from Judah. This kingdom would be gradually realized on earth, and the transformation of physical nature would go hand in hand with the ethical transformation of man until there was a new heaven and a new earth. Thus, finally, all sin and pain would disappear and men would live to the age of 1,000 years in happiness and peace, and after death enjoy a blessed immortality in the spirit world.

Jubilees insists (in Chapter 6) on a 364 day yearly calendar, made up of four quarters of 13 weeks each, rather than a year of 12 lunar months, which it says is off by 10 days per year (the actual number being about 11¼ days). It also insists on a "Double Sabbath" each year being counted as only one day to arrive at this computation.

Jubilees 7:20–29 is possibly an early reference to the Noahide laws.

== Reception ==
According to Kugel, an editor working during the Hasmonean period used Jubilees as one of two sources for the creation of the Aramaic Levi Document. Jubilees remained a point of reference for priestly circles (although they disputed its calendric proposal), and the Temple Scroll and "Epistle of Enoch" are based on Jubilees. It is the source for certain of the Testaments of the Twelve Patriarchs, for instance that of Reuben.

=== In the Jewish tradition ===
It was not canonized into the Jewish canon and there is no official record of it in Pharisaic or Rabbinical sources. According to Zvi Ron (2013), the Book of Jubilees may be categorized "as an early form of midrashic literature"; also some of its interpretations are preserved in later midrashic texts. For example, Jubilees, in its long section on Enoch, mentions the idea that Enoch was taken by angels to the Garden of Eden and learned astronomy from them. This idea can also be found in the Midrash Aggadah. There it is also mentioned that Enoch was transformed into the angel Metatron. In Jubilees, the similar figure is known as the "Angel of the Presence". The idea that Enoch was taught by angels, while seen as controversial, is also found elsewhere in rabbinic literature.

Midrash Tadshe was compiled in the early 11th-century, but it was based on a still earlier work by R. Pinchas b. Jair (end of second century A.D.). It has many parallels with Jubilees. Several sections of Midrash Tadshe are in entire agreement with Jubilees.

Other clear early evidence of Jubilees in Jewish tradition is in the Bereshit Rabba (5th century) and Pirkei de-Rabbi Eliezer (9th century).

In Bereshit Rabba 55:4, for example, the interpretation of Genesis 22:1 ('The Offering of Isaac') is paralleled to some extent in Jubilees 17:16. Both texts "reshape the story of Abraham by shifting the origin of the test from God to other figures". According to J. van Ruiten, also a "comparable interpretation occurs in [the Qumran text] 4Q225, Philo Biblical Antiquities 32:1–4; b. Sanhedrin 89b".

Some other midrashim showing parallels are the Chronicles of Jerahmeel, and especially the Midrash Vayisau.

The ancient Book of Noah did not survive to our time. Yet two considerable sections of it were incorporated in Jubilees. It was also used extensively by the Book of Enoch.

==== Ten trials of Abraham ====
The Book of Jubilees presents the earliest reference for the rabbinical story of the 'Ten trials of Abraham'. According to Jubilees 19:8, Abraham endured ten trials of faith, and was found faithful and patient in spirit. Nevertheless, Jubilees does not list all of the ten trials, missing some in Jubilees 17:17.

"And the Lord knew that Abraham was faithful in all his afflictions; for He had tried him through his country and with famine, and had tried him with the wealth of kings, and had tried him again through his wife, when she was torn (from him), and with circumcision; and had tried him through Ishmael and Hagar, his maid-servant, when he sent them away." - Jubilees 17:17

The rabbinic Mishnah contains several versions of the ten trials. For example, Mishnah Avot taught that Abraham suffered ten trials and withstood them all, demonstrating how great Abraham's love was for God. The Pirke De-Rabbi Eliezer also detailed the ten trials.

Medieval commentators Rashi and Maimonides differed on what 10 trials Abraham faced. Their interpretations can be compared.

=== Early Christian interpretation ===
It appears that early Christian writers held the Book of Jubilees in high regard, as many of them cited and alluded to Jubilees in their writings. In relationship to the New Testament, the Book of Jubilees contains one of the earliest references to the idea that God gave the Law to Moses through an angelic mediator. This idea is likewise reflected in the Epistle to the Galatians.

Ethiopic-speaking Christians translated Jubilees into Geʽez before the 6th century where it became part of the Ethiopic Bible.

In the Christian tradition of the Syriac language, Jubilees is first received in extant sources from the mid-6th to early-7th century Cave of Treasures, and then in Letter 13 to John of Litarba, and Scholion 10, both authored by Jacob of Edessa (d. 708). Later still is the Catena Severi (compiled 861), the Syriac reception of an Arabic chronicle of Agapius of Mabbug, and the writings of Michael the Syrian (d. 1199), Barhebraeus (d. 1286), and the Anonymous Chronicle by 1234.

Jan van Reeth argues that the Book of Jubilees had great influence on the formation of early Islam. (Note: Jan M.F. van Reeth (1992). Cf. also: • Klaus Berger (2008). Die Urchristen. Darmstadt: Wiss. Buchges. p. 340. OCLC 1074177423. • Andrew Rippin; Roberto Tottoli, eds. (2015). Books and Written Culture of the Islamic World: Studies Presented to Claude Gilliot on the Occasion of his 75th Birthday. Brill. p. 280 ff. ISBN 978-90-04-28375-6.) Etsuko Katsumata, comparing the Book of Jubilees and the Quran, notices significant differences, especially regarding Abraham's role in the Quranic narrative. He says that "The Quran has many passages in which Abraham expounds the errors in idolatry. In these passages, Abraham always addresses his words to local people, and he does not leave their land. This probably reflects Islam’s position that aims at converting idol worshippers to monotheistic religion and settling in their place of residence."

Donald Akenson describes the book as having "a calm and steady tone ... a quietly normal piece of religious writing, produced by a well-informed, concerned, but not agitated, follower of Yahweh who lives in the home land. Yet note what he is willing to do ... He does nothing less than correct the Books of Moses".

== Sources ==
- Jubilees bases its take on Enoch on the "Book of Watchers", 1 Enoch 1–36.
- Its sequence of events leading to the Flood match those of the "Dream Visions", 1 Enoch 83–90.

== See also ==
- Generations of Adam
- Wives aboard Noah's Ark
- The Book of Jasher
