= Antediluvian =

Biblical time period before the flood in the book of Genesis

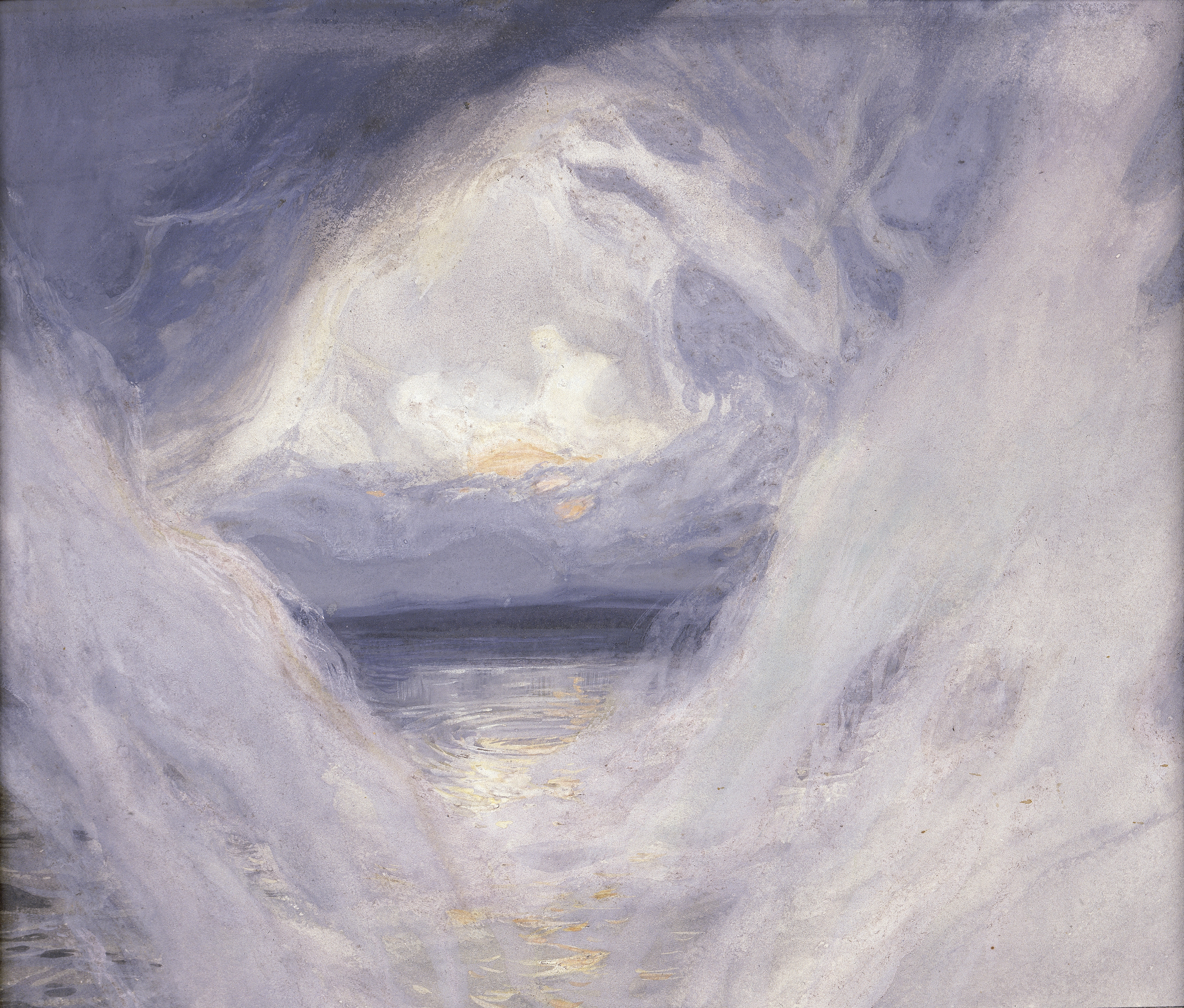
The Creation, beginning of the Antediluvian (i.e., Pre-Flood) world. (Artist's rendition by James Tissot.)

The antediluvian (alternatively pre-diluvian or pre-flood) period is the time period chronicled in the Bible between the fall of man and the Genesis flood narrative in biblical cosmology. The term was coined by Thomas Browne (1605–1682). The narrative takes up chapters 1–6 (excluding the flood narrative) of the Book of Genesis. The term found its way into early geology and science until the late Victorian era. Colloquially, the term is used to refer to any ancient and murky period.

== Precedents ==
The Eridu Genesis is considered to be a direct literary antecedent of various Ancient Near Eastern flood stories, including that of the Bible, and reflects a similar religious and cultural relevance to their religion. Much as the Abrahamic religions, ancient Sumerians divided the world between pre-flood and post-flood eras, the former being a time when God walked the earth with humans. Humans ceased to be immortal ever since Adam and Eve sinned, and the flood was punishment for the descendants of man because of their evil.

== Timing the antediluvian period ==
=== Biblical flood ===
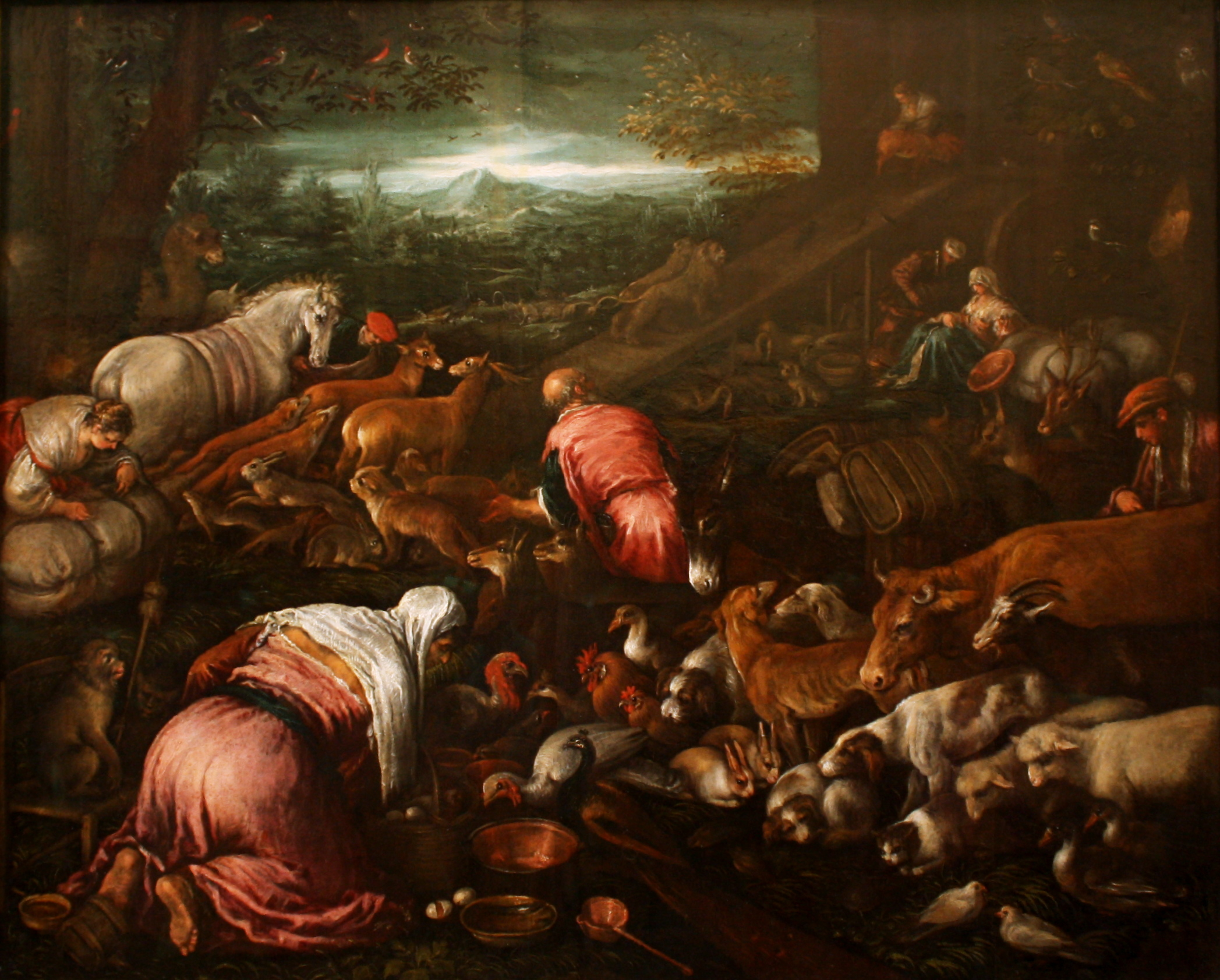
Noah prepares to leave the antediluvian world, Jacopo Bassano and assistants, 1579

In the Christian Bible, Hebrew Torah and Islamic Quran, the antediluvian period begins with the Fall of the first man and woman, according to Genesis and ends with the destruction of all life on the earth except those saved with Noah in the ark (Noah and his wife, his three sons and their wives). According to Bishop Ussher's 17th-century chronology, the antediluvian period lasted for 1656 years, from Creation (some say the fall of man) at 4004 BC to the Flood at 2348 BC. The elements of the narrative include some of the best-known stories in the Bible – the creation, Adam and Eve, and Cain and Abel, followed by the genealogies tracing the descendants of Cain and Seth, the third mentioned son of Adam and Eve. (These genealogies provide the framework for the biblical chronology, in the form "A lived X years and begat B".)

The Bible speaks of this era as being a time of great wickedness. There were Gibborim (giants) in the earth in those days as well as Nephilim; some Bible translations identify the two as one and the same. The Gibborim were unusually powerful; Genesis calls them "mighty men which were of old, men of renown". The antediluvian period ended when God sent the Flood to wipe out all life except Noah, his family, and the animals they took with them. Nevertheless, the Nephilim (literally meaning 'fallen ones', from the Hebrew root n-f-l 'to fall') reappear much later in the biblical narrative, in Numbers 13:31–33 (where the spies sent forth by Moses report that there were Nephilim or "giants" in the Promised Land).

=== In early geology ===
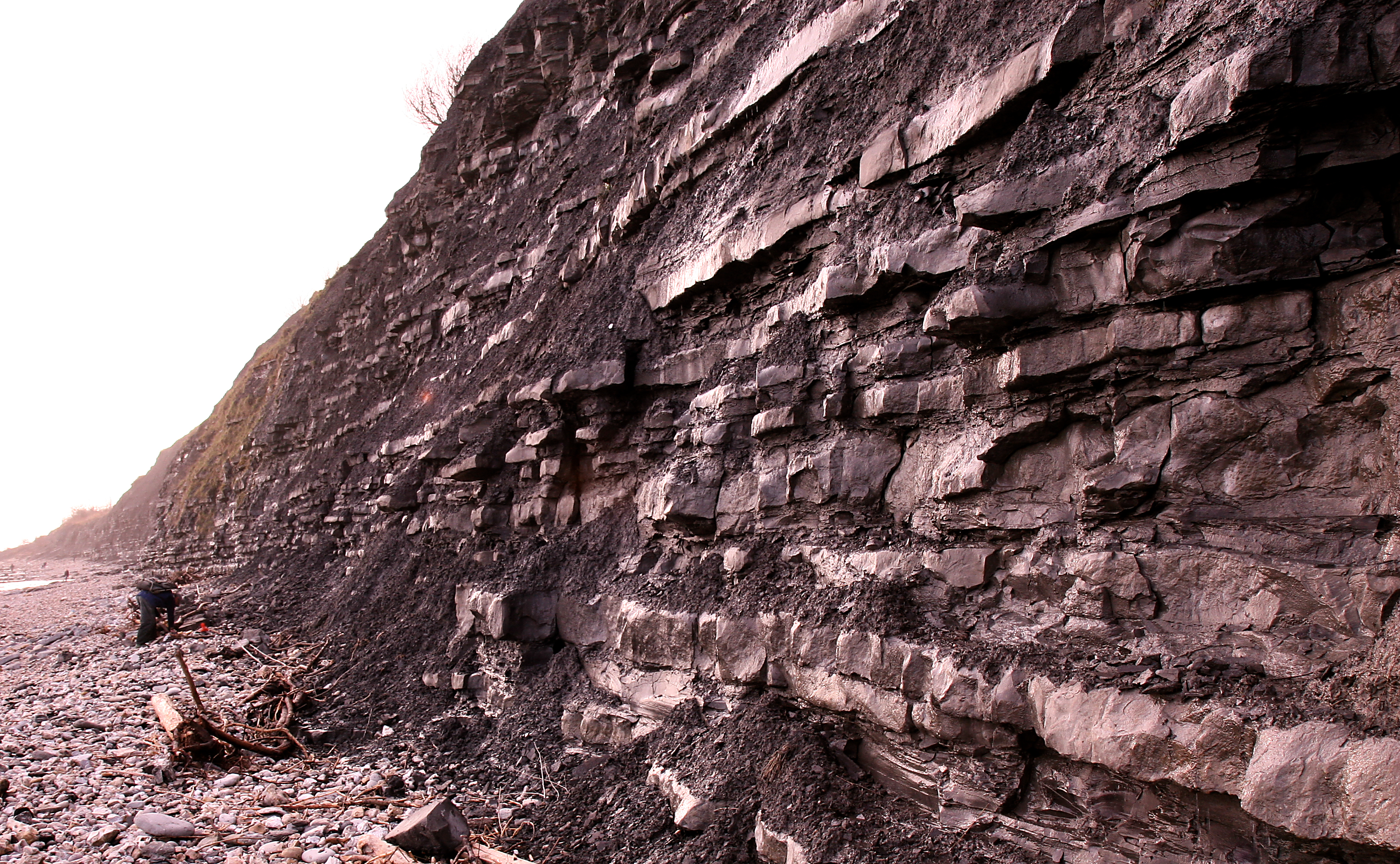
Strata of "Secondary rock", Lyme Regis

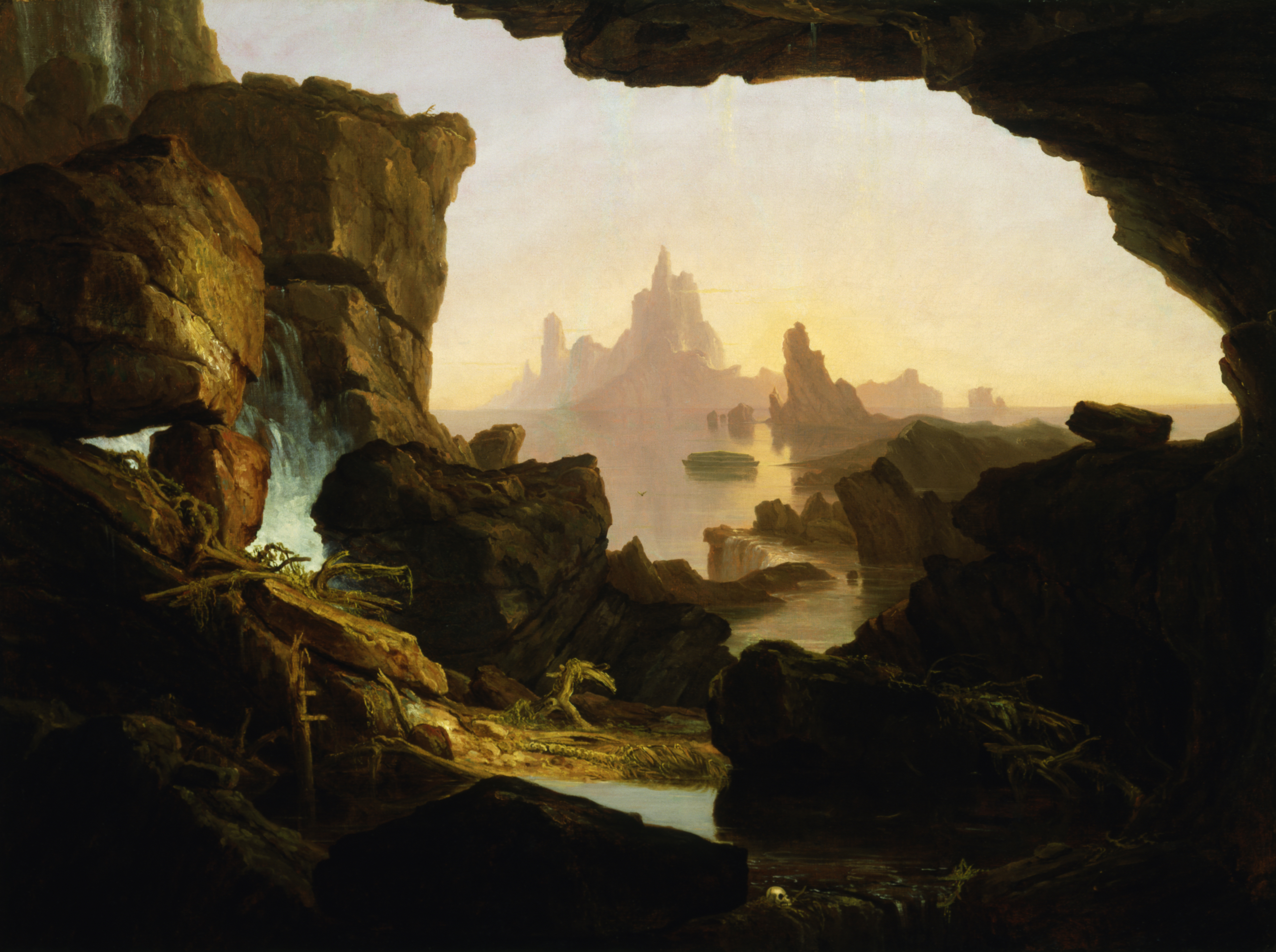
The Deluge subsides, thought in early geology to be responsible for the formation of sediments, with only traces of the antediluvian world. Thomas Cole, 1829

Early scientific attempts at reconstructing the history of the Earth were founded on the biblical narrative and thus used the term antediluvian to refer to a period understood to be essentially similar to the biblical one. Early scientific interpretation of the biblical narrative divided the antediluvian into sub-periods based on the six days of Creation:

- Pre-Adamitic (the first 5 days, Gen 1:1 to Gen 2:3)
  - Primary (the formation of the physical universe and the earth)
  - Secondary (creation of plants and animals)
- Adamitic (or Tertiary, from the Creation of man to the Great Flood; Gen 2:5 to Gen 7:8), corresponding to St. Augustine's First Age of his Six Ages of the World

Prior to the 19th century, rock was classified into three main types: primary or primitive (igneous and metamorphic rock), secondary (sedimentary rock) and tertiary (sediments). The primary rocks (like granite and gneiss) are void of fossils and were thought to be associated with the very creation of the world in the primary Pre-Adamitic period. The secondary rocks, often containing copious fossils, though human remains had not been found, were thought to have been laid down in the secondary Pre-Adamitic period. The Tertiary rocks (sediments) were thought to have been put down after Creation and possibly in connection to a flood event, and were thus associated with the Adamitic period. The Post-Flood period was termed the Quaternary, a name still in use in geology.

As mapping of the geological strata progressed in the early decades of the 19th century, the estimated lengths of the various sub-periods were greatly increased. The fossil rich Secondary Pre-Adamitic period was divided up into the Coal period, the Lias and the Chalk period, later expanded into the now-familiar geologic time scale of the Phanerozoic. The term antediluvian was used in natural science well into the 19th century and lingered in popular imagination despite increasingly detailed stratigraphy mapping the Earth's past, and was often used for the Pleistocene period, where humans existed alongside now extinct megafauna.

== Antediluvian world ==
=== Creationist interpretation ===
Garden of Eden by Thomas Cole, 1828. The lush vegetation and foggy atmosphere are typical of biblical interpretation of the antediluvian period.

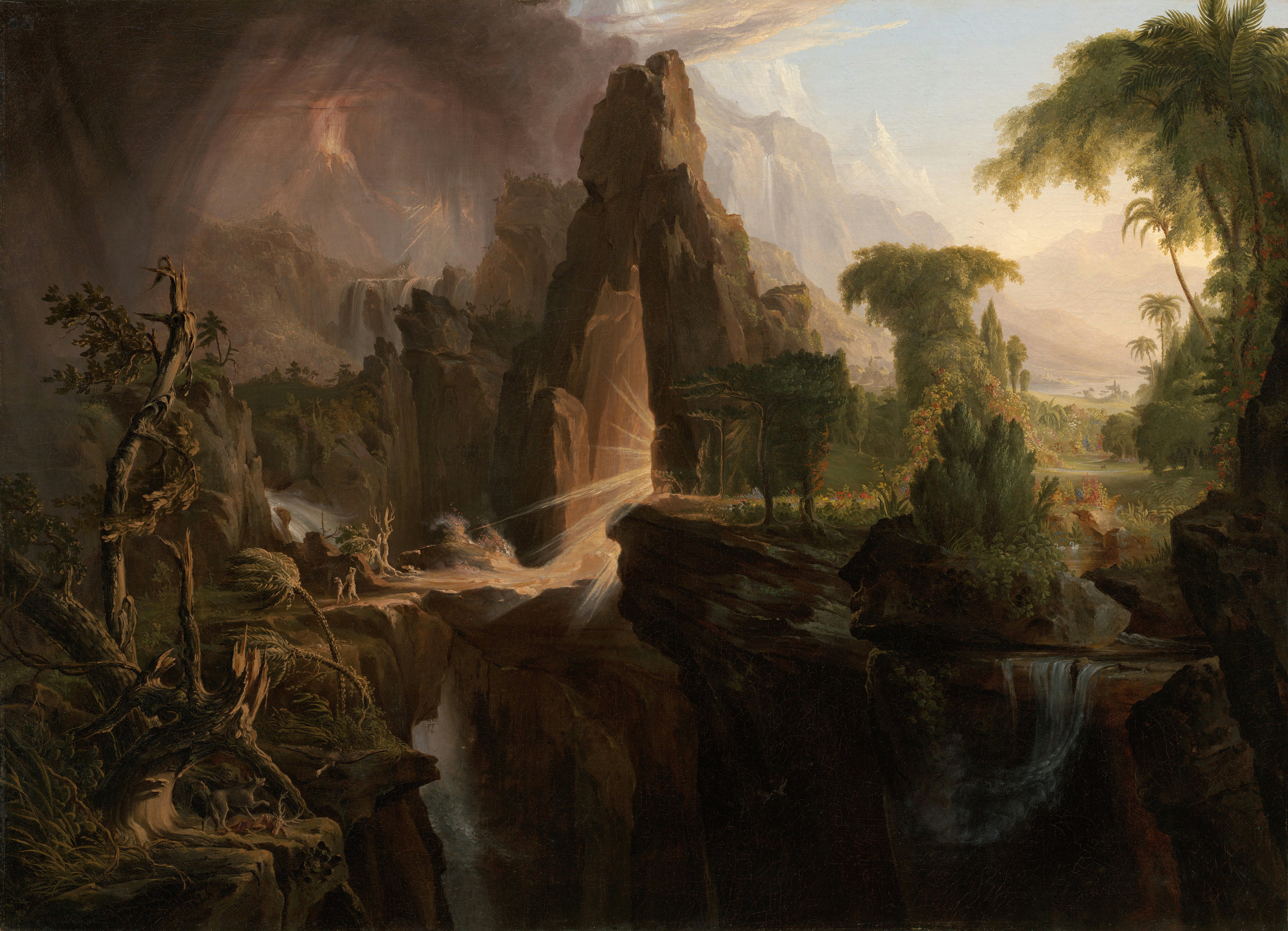
The end of the Edenic period, Adam and Eve are thrust into a bleak antediluvian world. Thomas Cole, 1828

Writers such as William Whiston (A New Theory of the Earth, 1696) and Henry Morris (The Genesis Flood, 1961) who launched the modern Creationist movement described the antediluvian period as follows:

- People lived much longer than those alive today, typically between 700 and 950 years, as reported in the genealogies of Genesis;
- The Earth contained many more people than it did in 1696. Whiston calculated that as many as 500 million humans may have been born in the antediluvian period, based on assumptions about lifespans and fertility rates;
- There were no clouds or rain. Instead, the Earth was watered by mists which rose from the Earth. (Another interpretation is that Earth was covered completely by a global cloud layer, which was the upper waters mentioned in the Creation. This is commonly called the vapor canopy view.)

However, there has since been debate among Creationists over the authenticity of arguments such as the one that there was no rain before the Flood and previous ideas about what the antediluvian world was like are constantly changing.

=== In 19th-century science ===
During the late 18th and early 19th centuries, the understanding of the nature of early Earth went through a transformation from a biblical or deist interpretation to a naturalistic one. Even back in the early 18th century, Plutonists had argued for an ancient Earth, but the full impact of the depth of time involved in the Pre-Adamitic period was not commonly accepted until uniformitarianism as presented in Charles Lyell's Principles of Geology of 1830. While each period was understood to be a vast aeon, the narrative of the pre-Adamitic world was still influenced by the biblical storyline of creation in this transition. A striking example is a description from Memoires of Ichtyosauri and Plesiosauri, 1839, describing fossil species in a world with land, sea and vegetation, but before the creation of a separate sun and moon, corresponding to the third day of creation in the Genesis narrative:

An "ungarnished and desolated world which echoed the flapping of [pterodactyl] leathern wings" was lit by "the angry light of supernatural fire", shining on a "sunless and moonless" world, before the creation of these heavenly "lights".

A modern naturalistic view of the ancient world, along with the abandonment of the term 'antediluvian', came about with the works of Charles Darwin and Louis Agassiz in the 1860s.

=== Antediluvian monsters ===
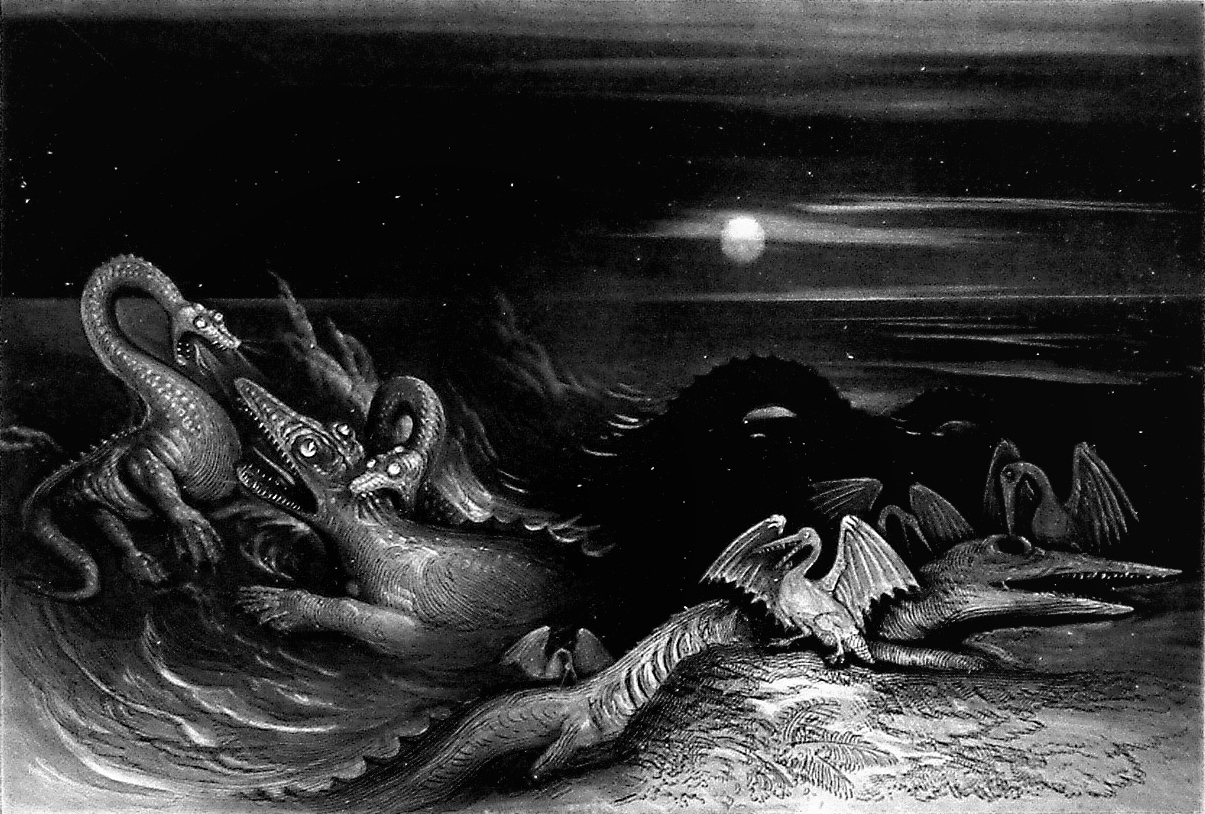
Demonic plesiosaurs and pterosaurs battling in eternal darkness by Thomas Hawkins, 1840

From antiquity, fossils of large animals were often quoted as having lived together with the giants from the Book of Genesis: e.g. the Tannin or "great sea monsters" of Gen 1:21. They are often described in later books of the Bible, especially by God himself in the Book of Job: e.g. Re'em in verse 39:9, Behemoth in chapter 40 and Leviathan in chapter 41. With the advent of geological mapping in the early 19th century, it became increasingly obvious that many of the fossils associated with the "secondary" (sedimentary) rock were neither those of giant humans nor of any extant animals. These included large animals such as ichthyosaurs, mosasaurs, pliosaurs and the various giant mammals found when excavating the Catacombs of Paris. The geologists of the day increasingly came to use the term 'antediluvian' only for the younger strata containing fossils of animals resembling those alive today.

== Other uses ==
- The term is also used in the field of Assyriology for kings, according to some versions of the Sumerian king list, supposed to have reigned before the great flood.
- The adjective antediluvian is sometimes used figuratively to mean of great age or outmoded. H. P. Lovecraft was particularly fond of the term, using it frequently in his horror stories.
- In Charles Stross's novel Saturn's Children, the religious order who believe in evolution refer to the antediluvian period as the time in which man lived alongside Tyrannosaurs.
- Atlantis: The Antediluvian World is an 1882 book by Ignatius L. Donnelly that attempted to establish that all known ancient civilizations were descended from Atlantis. Many theories mentioned in the book are the source of modern-day concepts about Atlantis.
- In the tabletop role-playing game Vampire: The Masquerade, the Antediluvians are the early vampires that lived in the pre-flood world and the supposed progenitors of the original clans.
- In the television series Huntik: Secrets & Seekers, Antedeluvian is a powerful vampiric Titan, formerly used by Vlad the Impaler. He returns in the second series as the primary Titan of Harrison Fears, an evil Seeker, to whom he power-bonds.

== See also ==
- Book of Enoch
- Generations of Noah
- History of Earth
