= Persian Sibyl =

Priestess presiding over the Apollonian oracle

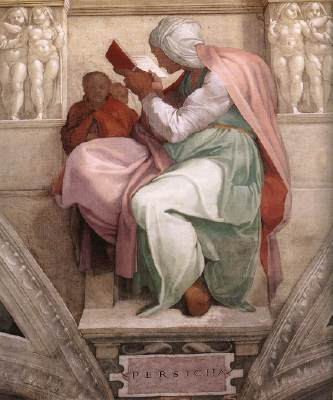
Michelangelo's rendering of the Persian Sibyl

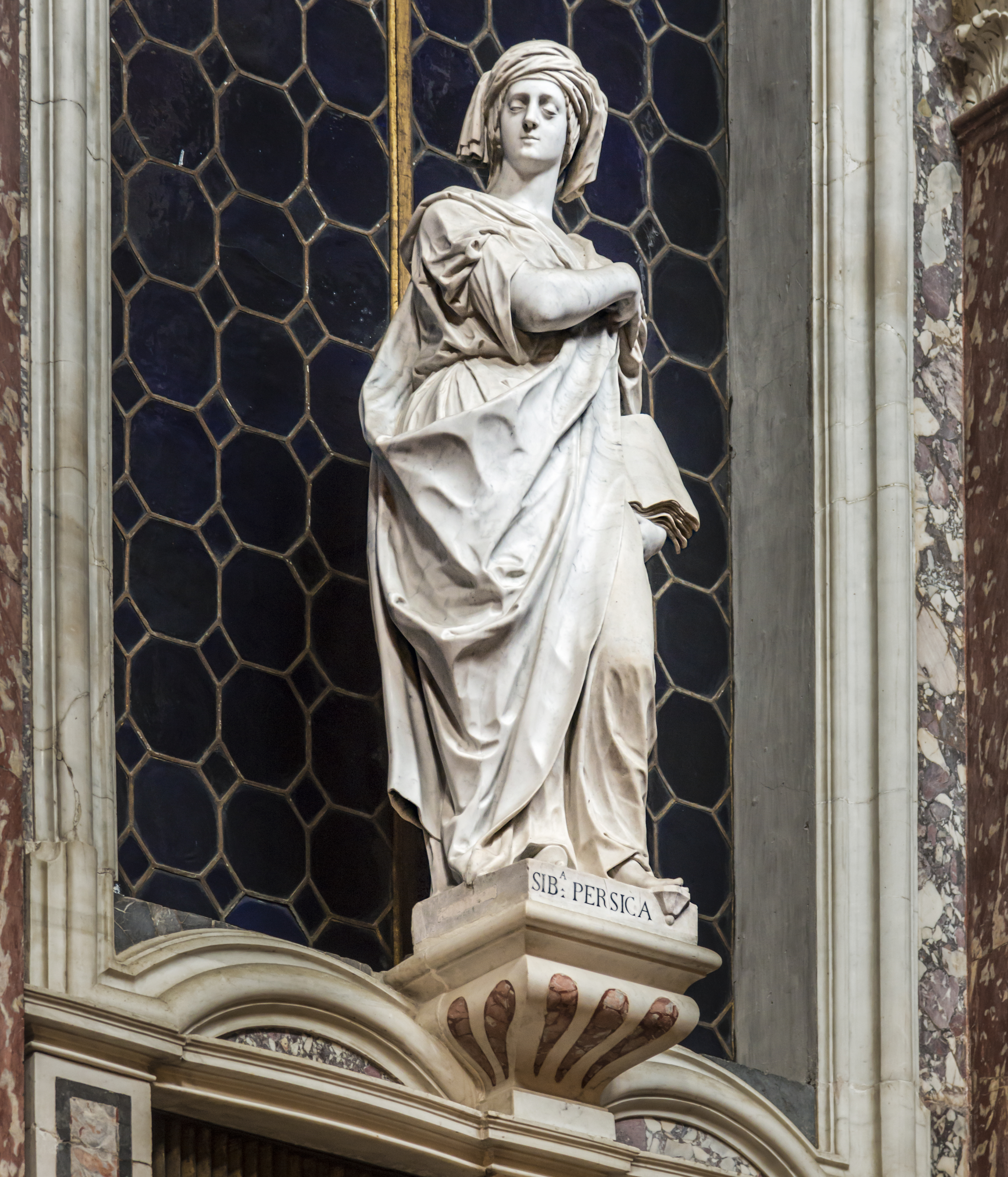
By Giuseppe Torretto Santa Maria degli Scalzi

The Persian Sibyl – also known as the Babylonian, Chaldaean, Hebrew or Egyptian Sibyl – was the prophetic priestess presiding over the Apollonian oracle.

The word "Sibyl" comes (via Latin) from the ancient Greek word sibylla, meaning "prophetess". There were many Sibyls in the ancient world, but the Persian Sibyl allegedly foretold the exploits of Alexander of Macedon. Nicanor, who wrote a life of Alexander, mentions her.

The Persian Sibyl has had at least three names: Sambethe, Helrea and Sabbe.

Sambethe was said to be of the family of Noah. The Persian Sibyl by Guercino hangs in the Capitoline Museum in Rome.

Pausanias, pausing at Delphi to enumerate four sibyls, mentions a "Hebrew sibyl":

there grew up among the Hebrews above Palestine, a woman who gave oracles named Sabbe, whose father was Berosus and her mother Erymanthe. Some say she was a Babylonian, while others call her an Egyptian Sibyl.

The medieval Byzantine encyclopedia, the Suda, credits the Hebrew Sibyl as the author of the Sibylline oracles (not to be confused with the Sibylline Books), a collection of texts of c. the 2nd to 4th century which were collected in the 6th century.

== See also ==
- Sibylline oracles
- Wives aboard the Ark
