= Adam's ale =

Colloquial allusion to water

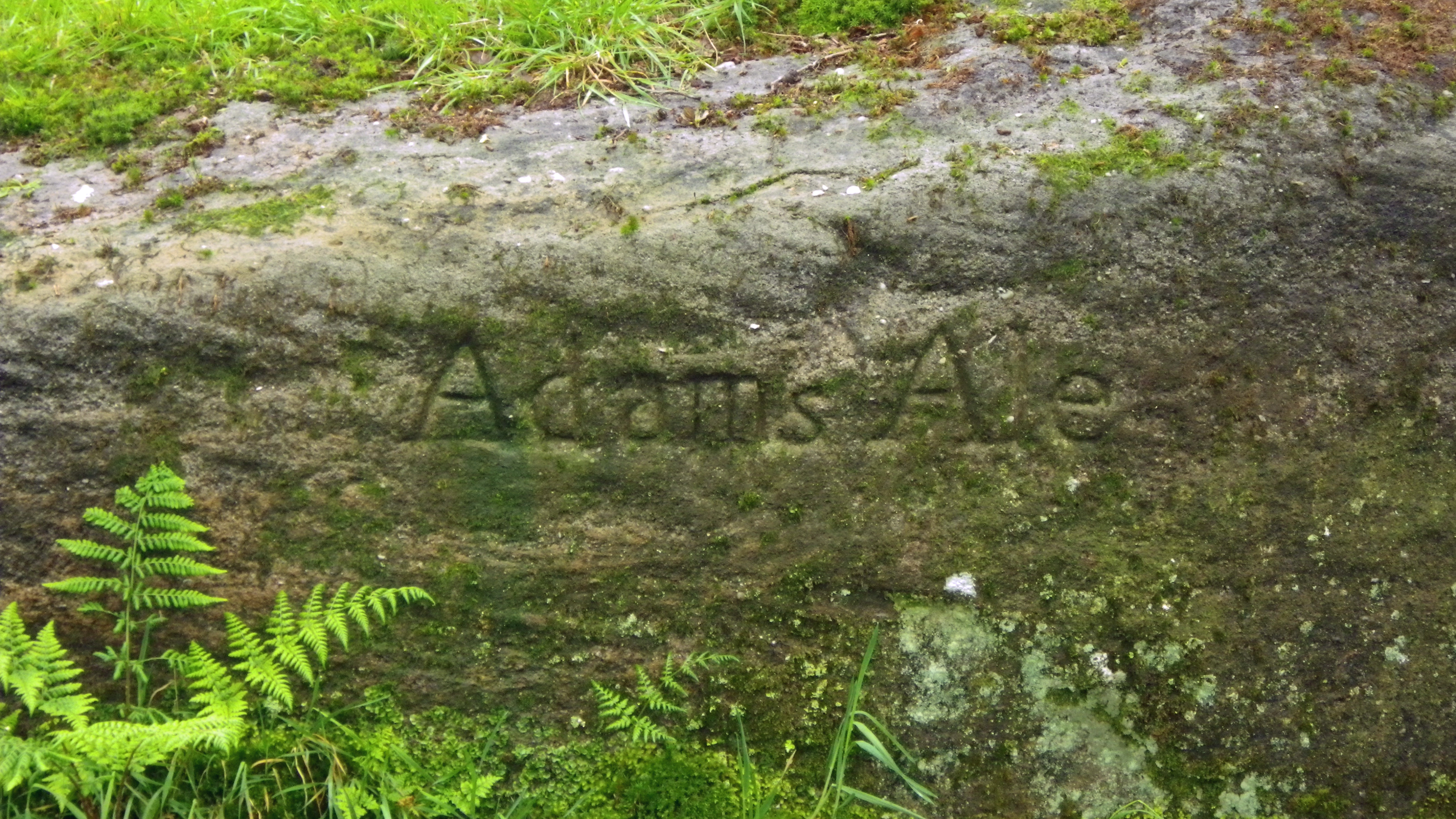
Spring at Brimham Rocks, England, with "Adam's Ale" carved in the stone.

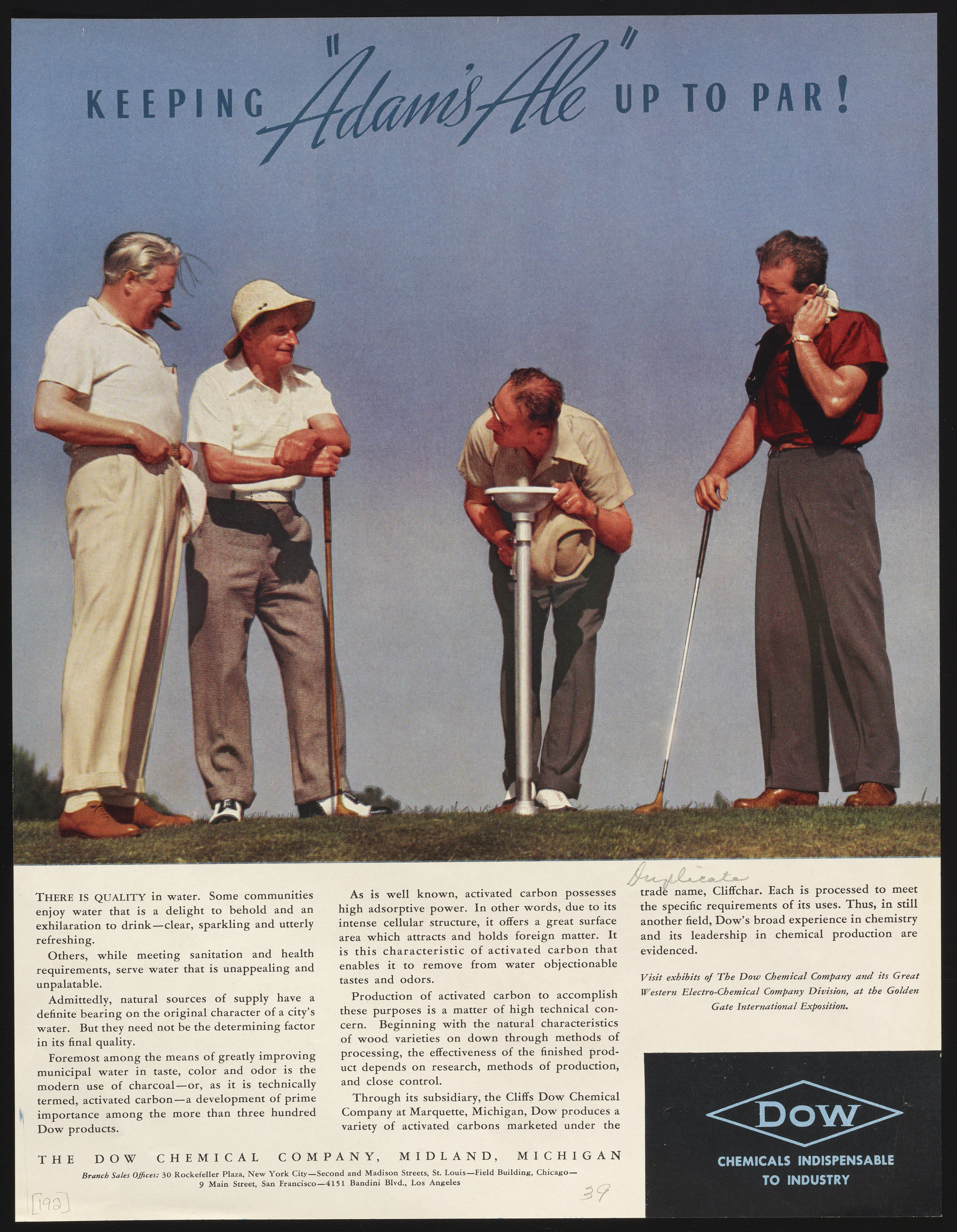
"Keeping 'Adam's Ale' Up to Par!" — 1939 Dow Chemical advertisement for activated carbon water filtration.

Adam's ale (also referred to as Adam's wine, especially in Scotland; sometimes simply called Adam) is a colloquial allusion meaning water. It alludes to the idea that the biblical Adam had only water to drink. This inference gained popularity around the beginning of the 19th-century temperance movement.

== Definition and origin ==
"Adam's ale" means unadulterated water, based on the presumption that the biblical first man Adam had only water to drink in the Garden of Eden — in the Book of Genesis, the few chapters that come between the creation of Adam and the birth of Noah contain no mention of alcoholic drinks. After the account of the great flood, the biblical Noah is said to have cultivated a vineyard, made wine, and become intoxicated, from which readers inferred that Noah invented alcohol. Common variations are "Adam's wine" in Scotland, and sometimes simply "Adam". The phrase is an allusion, colloquialism, epithet and idiom. In common use until the mid- to late 20th century, usage of the phrase has declined. The earliest known printed occurrence of "Adam's ale" is attributed to William Prynne's The Soveraigne Power of Parliaments and Kingdomes, which was first printed in 1643.

== Use in the temperance movement ==
The term "Adam's Ale" gained popularity during the emergence of the temperance movement in the 1830s. Water is provided by nature and was therefore presumably the only drink available to the first man in the Garden of Eden; hence it was considered pure by the movement. During the proceedings of the World's Temperance Convention held in London in the year 1846, the Rev. Dr. S. H. Cox, hailing from Brooklyn, New York, said during his speech:

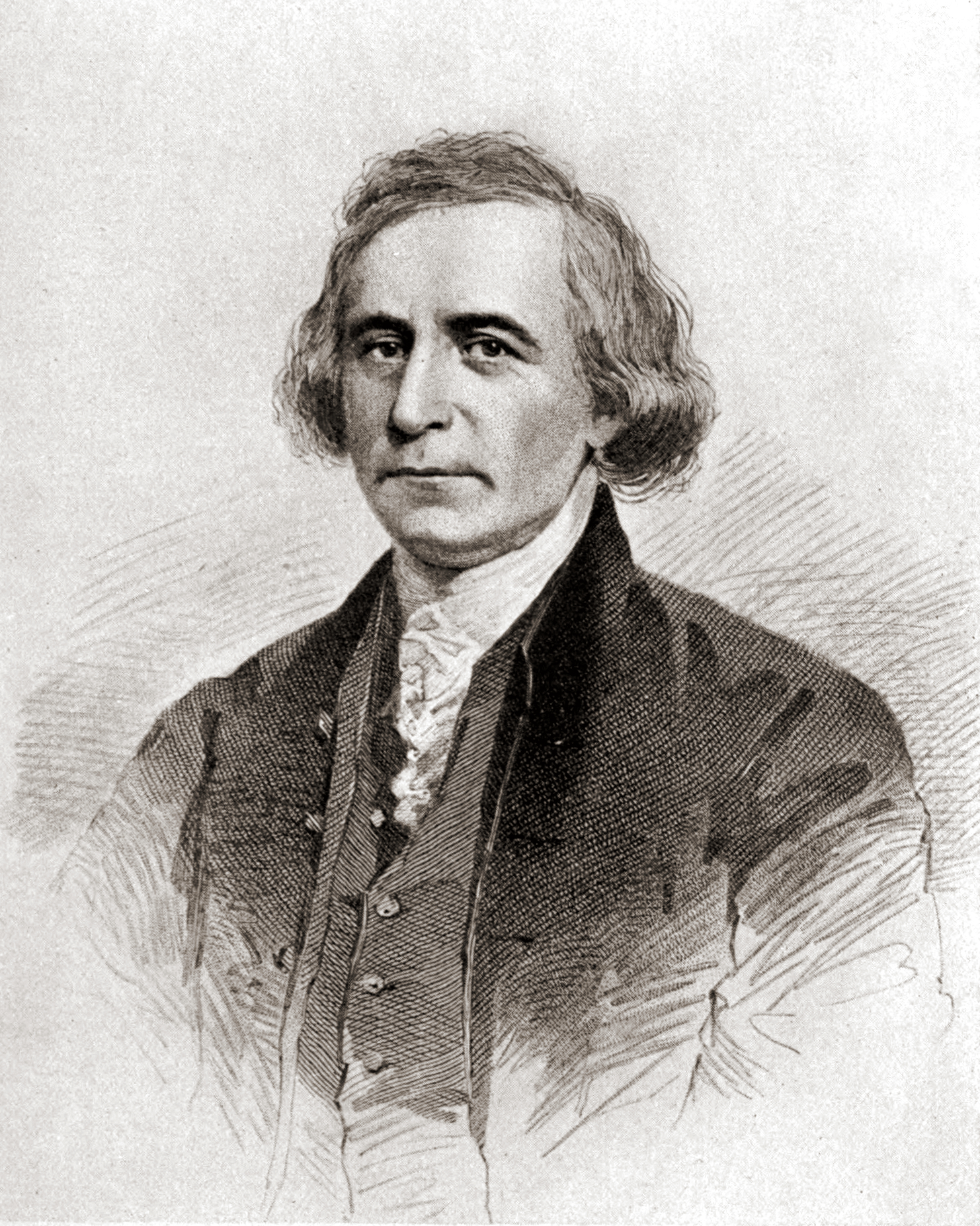
Philip Freneau

[W]hat hurt will it do me to drink of this water?' Our father Adam had nothing better for his wedding-day, and before the earth was cursed, or sin had entered it, Paradise produced nothing better than this pure element. It was the drink of Adam and Eve when the morning stars sang together, and when the sons of God shouted for joy.

Philip Freneau wrote a poem that was an aid to the early teetotalism movement. Freneau (an American) was captured in 1780 by the British while on a voyage in the West Indies during the American War for Independence. After his release he wrote the poem called "The [Terra Cotta] Jug of Rum", criticizing alcoholic beverages. An excerpt from this literature shows a poetic use of "Adam's ale":

"A spring that never yet grew stale——
Such virtue lies in—Adam's ale!"

Later on Freneau used the phrase in a second poem concerning a legislative act prohibiting the use of spirituous liquors by prisoners in certain jails of the United States.

== See also ==
- Noah's wine, a contrasting term that refers to alcoholic beverages
- Eve, the biblical first woman
