= Wives aboard Noah's Ark =

Aspect of the Genesis flood narrative

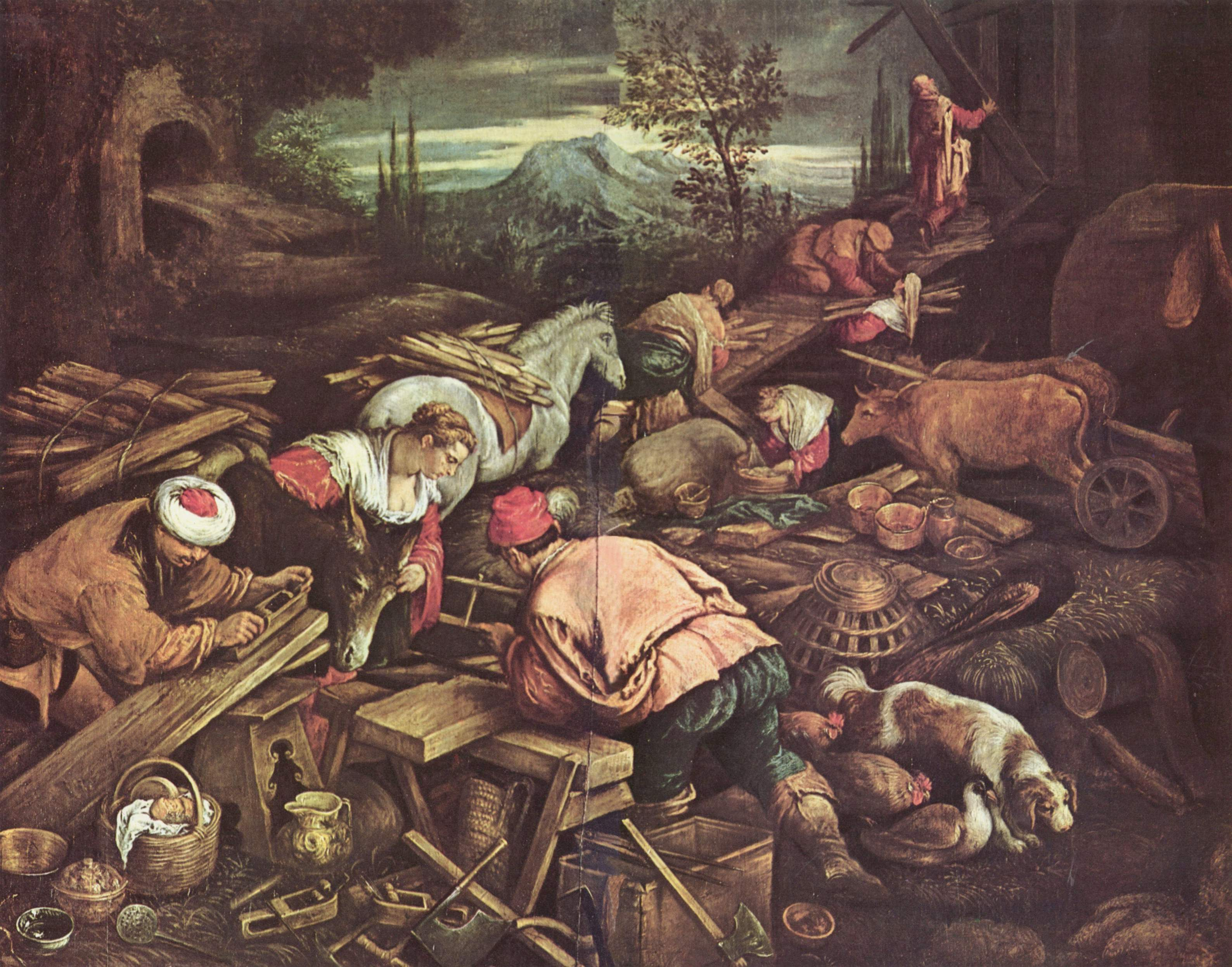
The Construction of Noah's Ark. by Jacopo Bassano depicts all eight people said to be on the ark, including Noah's wife and the wives of his three sons.

The wives aboard Noah's Ark were part of the family that survived the Deluge in the biblical Genesis flood narrative from the Bible. These wives are the wife of Noah, and the wives of each of his three sons. Although the Bible only notes the existence of these women, there are extra-biblical mentions regarding them and their names.

== In the Bible ==
In Genesis 6:18, God says to Noah, "But I will establish my covenant with you, and you shall come into the ark, you, your sons, your wife, and your sons' wives with you" (ESV).

The deuterocanonical Book of Tobit (written c. 225–175 BC) does not name any of the wives aboard Noah's Ark, but states that Noah's wife was one of his "own kindred" (Tobit 4:12).

1 Peter 3:20 (written in the late 1st century AD) states that there were eight people on the Ark.

== In other writings ==
=== Dead Sea Scrolls ===
In the Genesis Apocryphon, part of the Dead Sea Scrolls, Noah's wife is named Emzara.

=== Book of Jubilees ===
In the Book of Jubilees (160–150 BC), considered canon by the Ethiopian Orthodox Church as well as Beta Israel, the names of the wives are given as Emzara, wife of Noah; Sedeqetelebab, wife of Shem; Na'eltama'uk, wife of Ham; and Adataneses, wife of Japheth. It adds that the three sons each built a city named after their wives.

=== Sibylline Oracles ===
According to the Sibylline Oracles (6th or 7th century AD), the wives of Shem, Ham, and Japheth enjoyed fantastically long lifespans, living for centuries, while speaking to each generation they saw come and go. According to the preface of the Oracles, the Sibyl author was a daughter-in-law of Noah: the "Babylonian Sibyl", Sambethe — who, 900 years after the Deluge, allegedly moved to Greece and began writing the Oracles. The writings attributed to her (at the end of Book III) also hint at possible names of her family who would have lived before the Flood — father Gnostos, mother Circe; elsewhere (in book V) she calls Isis her sister. Other early sources similarly name one of the Sibyls as Sabba (see Sibyl in Jewish Encyclopedia).

=== Quran ===
In the Quran, Noah's wife and Lot's wife are mentioned as two examples of unbelievers who were not saved by Allah.

=== Comte de Gabalis ===
A kabalistic work that appeared in 1670, known as Comte de Gabalis, maintains that the name of Noah's wife was Vesta.

This name for Noah's wife had earlier been found in Pedro Sarmiento de Gamboa's History of the Incas (c. 1550), where the names Prusia or Persia, Cataflua and Funda are also given for Shem, Ham, and Japheth's wives respectively.

== In traditions ==
=== Christian traditions ===
The early Christian writer St. Hippolytus (d. 235 AD) recounted a tradition of their names according to the Syriac Targum that is similar to Jubilees, although apparently switching the names of Shem's and Ham's wives. He wrote: "The names of the wives of the sons of Noah are these: the name of the wife of Sem, Nahalath Mahnuk; and the name of the wife of Cham, Zedkat Nabu; and the name of the wife of Japheth, Arathka". He also recounts a quaint legend concerning the wife of Ham: God had instructed Noah to destroy the first person who announced that the deluge was beginning, Ham's wife at that moment was baking bread, when water suddenly rushed forth from the oven, destroying the bread. When she exclaimed then that the deluge was commencing, God suddenly cancels his former command lest Noah destroy his own daughter-in-law who was to be saved.

An early Arabic work known as Kitab al-Magall or the Book of Rolls (part of Clementine literature), the Syriac Book of the Cave of Treasures (c. 350), and Patriarch Eutychius of Alexandria (c. 930) all agree in naming Noah's wife as "Haykêl, the daughter of Namûs (or Namousa), the daughter of Enoch, the brother of Methuselah"; the first of these sources elsewhere calls Haikal "the daughter of Mashamos, son of Enoch", while stating that Shem's wife is called "Leah, daughter of Nasih".

Furthermore, the Panarion of Epiphanius (c. 375) names Noah's wife as Barthenos, while the c. 5th-century Ge'ez work Conflict of Adam and Eve with Satan calls Noah's wife "Haikal, the daughter of Abaraz, of the daughters of the sons of Enos" — whom some authors have connected with Epiphanius' Barthenos (i.e., Bath-Enos, daughter of Enos). However, Jubilees makes "Betenos" the name of Noah's mother. The word haykal is Syriac for "temple" or "church"; in the Georgian copy of Cave of Treasures, we find instead the name T'ajar, which is the Georgian word for the same.

Armenian tradition gives the name of Noah's wife as Nemzar, Noyemzar, or Noyanzar.

Patriarch Eutychius of Alexandria, writing in Arabic, also states that Shem's wife was Salit, Ham's Nahlat, and Japheth's Arisisah, all daughters of Methuselah. The theologian John Gill (1697–1771) wrote in his Exposition of the Bible of this tradition "that the name of Shem's wife was Zalbeth, or, as other copies, Zalith or Salit; that the name of Ham's Nahalath; and of Japheth's Aresisia."

A manuscript of the 8th-century Latin work Inventiones Nominum, copies of which have been found at the Abbey of St. Gall in Switzerland, and in a library at Albi, SW France, lists as Noah's wife Set, as Shem's wife Nora, as Ham's wife Sare, and as Japeth's wife Serac.

Hungarian folklore has several tales about Japheth and his wife called Eneh, attributing this information to the Chronicles of Sigilbert, Bishop of Antioch in the 14th-century Képes Krónika.

=== Jewish Rabbinic literature ===
The Genesis Rabba midrash lists Naamah, the daughter of Lamech and sister of Tubal-Cain, as the wife of Noah, as does the 11th-century Jewish commentator Rashi in his commentary on Genesis 4:22.

In the medieval midrash Book of Jasher, the name of Noah's wife is said to be Naamah, daughter of Enoch.

=== Gnostic traditions ===
Gnostic literature of the first few centuries AD calls Noah's wife Norea, including texts ascribed to her, as reported by Epiphanius, and confirmed in modern times with the discovery of the texts at Nag Hammadi.

Mandaean literature, of uncertain antiquity, refers to Noah's (or Shem's) wife by the name Nuraita (or Nhuraitha, Anhuraita, various other spellings). There is some contradiction between texts, and some textual ambiguity, regarding which patriarch is married to Nuraita; additionally, Anhuraita appears to be a portmanteau of Nuraita and Anhar, the wives of Noah and Shem.

=== Islamic traditions ===
The Persian historian Muhammad ibn Jarir al-Tabari (c. 915) recounts that Japheth's wife was Arbasisah, daughter of Marazil, son of al-Darmasil, son of Mehujael, son of Enoch, son of Cain; that Ham's wife was Naḥlab, daughter of Marib, another son of al-Darmasil; and that Shem's wife was Ṣalib, daughter of Batawil, another son of Mehujael. He says Noah's wife was Amzurah, daughter of Barakil, another son of Mehujael.

(According to George Sale's Commentary on the Quran (1734), some Muslim commentators asserted that Noah had had an infidel wife named Waila, who perished in the deluge, and was thus not aboard the Ark.)

=== Irish and Anglo-Saxon traditions ===
Irish folklore is rich in traditions and legends regarding the three sons and their wives. Here the wives are usually named Olla, Olliva, and Ollivani (or variations thereof), names possibly derived from the Anglo-Saxon Codex Junius (c. 700 AD), a Bible paraphrase written in the fashion of Germanic sagas, and often attributed to the poet Cædmon. The wife of Noah is given as Percoba in Codex Junius.

The Anglo-Saxon "Solomon and Saturn" dialogue gives for Noah's wife Dalila, for Ham's, Jaitarecta, and for Japheth's Catafluvia, while giving Olla, Ollina, and Ollibana as alternatives. The name of Shem's wife is missing. Some versions of the Gaelic Lebor Gabala also name Shem's, Ham's, and Japheth's wives as Cata Rechta, Cata Flauia, and Cata Chasta respectively. Similar traditions seem to have endured for several centuries in some form, for in Petrus Comestor, we read that the wives of Noah, Shem, Ham, and Japheth are Phuarpara, Pharphia, Cataflua, and Fliva respectively, and in a 15th-century Middle English catechism, we find written "What hicht Noes wyf?" "Dalida; and the wif of Sem, Cateslinna; and the wif of Cam, Laterecta; and the wif of Japheth, Aurca. And other 3 names, Ollia, Olina, and Olybana."

Ælfric of Eynsham's Anglo-Saxon translation of the Heptateuch (c. 1000) included illustrations with the wives' names recorded in the captions. One such illustration (fol. 17) names Noah's wife as Phiapphara, Shem's as Parsia, Ham's as Cataphua, and Japheth's as Fura. Another (fol. 14) includes one wife, presumably Noah's, named Sphiarphara. A Middle English illustrated version of Genesis dating to the 13th century also gives Puarphara as Noah's wife.

In medieval mystery plays Noah's wife is often portrayed as a comical harridan who refuses to board the arc and has to be dragged into it by force

=== Pseudo-Berossus ===
According to the 15th-century monk Annio da Viterbo, the Hellenistic Babylonian writer Berossus had stated that the sons' wives were Pandora, Noela, and Noegla, and that Noah's wife was Tytea. However, Annio's manuscript is widely regarded today as having been a forgery.

Nonetheless, later writers made use of this information, sometimes even combining it with other traditions. The Portuguese friar Gaspar Rodriguez de S. Bernardino wrote in Itinerario da India por terra ate a ilha de Chypre in 1842 that the wives of Noah, Shem, Ham, and Japheth were named Tytea or Phuarphara, Pandora or Parphia, Noela or Cataflua, and Noegla, Eliua or Arca. In Robert Southey's Common-place Book from around the same time, similar names are given, with the information attributed to the "Comte de Mora Toledo": Titea Magna; Pandora; Noala or Cataflua; and Noegla, Funda or Afia, respectively.

== See also ==
- Hebrew Sibyl
- List of names for the biblical nameless
- Noah's wife
- Seven Laws of Noah
- Women in the Bible
