= Noah in rabbinic literature =

Allusions in rabbinic literature to the Biblical character Noah, who saved his family and representatives of all the animals from a great flood by constructing an ark, contain various expansions, elaborations and inferences beyond what is presented in the text of the Bible itself.

== Marriage ==
Although the Torah calls Noah "a just man and perfect in his generations", nevertheless the rabbis debated the degree of his righteousness. Some think that Noah was a just man only in comparison with his generation, which was very wicked, but that he could not be compared with any of the other righteous men mentioned in the Torah. These same rabbis go still further and assert that Noah himself was included in the divine decree of destruction, but that he found grace in the eyes of the Lord (Genesis 6:8) for the sake of his descendants. Other rabbis, on the contrary, extol Noah's righteousness, saying that his generation had no influence on him, and that had he lived in another generation, his righteousness would have been still more strongly marked. Accordingly, the terms "wise" (hakham) and "stupid" (ba'ar) are applied to Noah by different rabbis. Still, it is generally acknowledged that before the Flood, Noah was, by comparison with his contemporaries, a really upright man and a prophet. He was considered as God's shepherd.

Two different reasons are given why Noah begat no children until he had reached the advanced age of 500 years, while his ancestors had families at a much younger age. One explanation is that Noah, foreseeing that a flood would destroy the world on account of its corruption, refused to marry on the ground that his offspring would perish. God, however, ordered him to take a wife, so that after the Flood he might repeople the earth. Alternatively, God rendered him impotent until the age of 500, saying: "If his children be wicked, he will be afflicted by their destruction; and if they be upright like their father, they will be troubled with making so many arks". Sefer haYashar and Genesis Rabba both agree that Noah's wife was called Naamah. According to the latter, she was the sister of Tubal-cain (Genesis 4:21); according to the former, she was a daughter of Enoch, and Noah married her when he was 498 years old.

== Making of the Ark ==
On being informed of the end of the world, Noah exhorted his contemporaries to repentance, foretelling them that a flood would destroy the earth on account of the wickedness of its people. He planted cedar-trees and felled them, continuing to do so for the space of 120 years. When the people asked him why he prepared so many trees, he told them that he was going to make an ark to save himself from the Flood which was about to come upon the earth. But the people ignored and mocked at him, using vile language; and Noah suffered violent persecution at their hands.

According to one legend, God showed Noah with His finger how to make the ark; but according to the Sefer Noah Noah learned how to build it, and mastered as well the various sciences, from the Sefer Razi'el (the book from which the angel Raziel taught Adam all the sciences), which had been brought to him by the angel Raphael.

The construction of the ark lasted 52 years; Noah purposely working slowly, in the hope that the people would take warning therefrom and would repent. Sefer haYashar, however, assigns only five years for the construction of the ark.

Noah could distinguish between clean and unclean animals inasmuch as the ark of itself gave admittance to seven of the clean animals, while of the unclean ones it admitted two only. Sefer haYashar describes another method for distinguishing them: the clean animals and fowls crouched before Noah, while the unclean ones remained standing.

A difference of opinion exists regarding Noah's entering the ark. According to some rabbis, Noah's faith was so small that he did not enter the ark until he stood ankle deep in water. Others declare that Noah waited for God's directions to enter the ark, just as he awaited His permission to leave it.

== Within the ark ==
When Noah and his family and everything that he had taken with him were inside the ark, the people left outside asked him to admit them too, promising repentance. Noah refused to admit them, objecting that he had exhorted them to repent many years before the Flood. The people then assembled in great numbers around the ark in order to break into it; but they were destroyed by the lions and other wild animals which also surrounded it.

Noah was constantly occupied in the ark; for he had to attend to all the living things which were with him and which fed at different times. One of the lions, having become enraged at Noah, attacked and injured him, so that he remained lame for the rest of his life. Noah, during the twelve months that he was in the ark, did not sleep one moment.

Noah had also to feed Og, who, being unable to enter the ark, sat upon it, taking hold of one of its timbers. Noah made a hole in the side of the ark through which he passed food to Og; Og then swore to be Noah's eternal servant.

Being in great distress, Noah prayed to God to shorten the time of his suffering. God answered him that He had decreed that the Flood should last twelve months and that such decree might not be changed.

When Noah sent the raven to see whether the waters were abated, it refused to go, saying: "Thy Lord hates me; for, while seven of other species were received into the ark, only two of mine were admitted. And you also hate me; for, instead of sending one from the sevens, you sendest me! If I am met by the angel of heat or by the angel of cold, my species will be lost." Noah answered the raven: "The world has no need of you; for you art good neither for food nor for sacrifice." God, however, ordered Noah to receive the raven into the ark, as it was destined to feed Elijah.

When Noah, on leaving the ark, saw the destruction wrought on the world, he began to weep, saying: "Lord of the world, You are merciful; why have You not pitied Your children?" God answered him: "Foolish shepherd! Now you implore My clemency. Had you done so when I announced to you the Flood, it would not have come to pass. You knew that you would be rescued, and therefore did not care for others; now you pray." Noah acknowledged his fault, and offered sacrifices in expiation of it. It was because Noah neglected to pray for his contemporaries that he was punished with lameness and that his son Ham abused him.

== Lapse ==
The planting of a vineyard by Noah and his drunkenness caused him to be regarded by the ancient rabbis in a new light, much to his disparagement. He lost much if not all of his former merit.

He was considered one of the three worthless men that were eager for agricultural pursuits. He was the first to plant, to become drunken, to curse, and to introduce slavery. God blamed Noah for his intemperance, saying that he ought to have been warned by Adam, upon whom so much evil came through wine. According to Pirkei de-Rabbi Eliezer, Noah took into the ark a vine-branch which had been cast out with Adam from paradise. He had previously eaten its grapes, and their savor induced him to plant their seed, the results of which proved lamentable. When Noah was about to plant the vineyard, Satan offered him his help, for which he was to have a share in the produce. Noah consented. Satan then successively slaughtered a sheep, a lion, an ape, and a hog, fertilizing the ground with their blood. Satan thereby indicated to Noah that after drinking the first cup of wine, one is mild like a sheep; after the second, courageous like a lion; after the third, like an ape; and after the fourth, like a hog who wallows in mud. This legend is narrated by Ibn Yahya thus: "Noah, seeing a he-goat eat sour grapes and become intoxicated so that it began to frisk, took the root of that vine-branch and, after having washed it with the blood of a lion, a hog, a sheep, and an ape, planted it and it bore sweet grapes."

The vineyard bore fruit the same day that it was planted, and the same day, too, Noah gathered grapes, pressed them, drank their juice, became intoxicated, and was abused by Ham.

== Other ==
Noah should have lived 1,000 years; but he gave Moses 50 years, which, together with the 70 taken from Adam's life, constituted Moses' 120 years. There is a tradition that Noah lived to see 14,400 of his descendants.

Some identify Noah with Melchizedek, and declare that he founded Jerusalem.

Jewish tradition teaches that the flood in the days of Noah was a global flood so much so that the birds also had to enter the ark.

== See also ==
- Moses in rabbinic literature
- Noah's wine
- Seven Laws of Noah
