= Noah's wife =

Nameless female in the Bible

Noah's wife is one of the four wives aboard Noah's Ark. While nameless in the Bible (Genesis 4:22; Gen. 7:7), apocryphal literature lists 103 variations of her name and personality.

Some apocryphal literature identified her with Naamah, the daughter of Lamech, and thus a descendant of Cain, but the deuterocanonical Book of Tobit states that Noah's wife was one of his "own kindred" (Tobit 4:12). In the Dead Sea Scrolls, she is named Emzara. The name is translated as Mazara in some texts.

== In Mandaeism ==
The Book of Kings, the final book of the Mandaean Right Ginza, refers to Noah's (or Shem's) wife by the name Nuraita (Classical Mandaic: ࡍࡅࡓࡀࡉࡕࡀ, Modern Mandaic pronunciation: [nuˈreiθa]; or Nhuraitha, Anhuraita, among various other spellings). There is some contradiction between texts, and some textual ambiguity, regarding which patriarch is married to Nuraita; additionally, Anhuraita appears to be a portmanteau of Nuraita and Anhar, the wives of Noah and Shem.

== See also ==
- Wives aboard Noah's Ark
- Noah in Islam

== Bibliography ==
- Utley, Francis Lee (1941). "The One Hundred and Three Names of Noah's Wife". Speculum. 16 (4): 426–452. doi:10.2307/2852842. JSTOR 2852842. S2CID 163797953.
- Tolmie, Jane (1 January 2002). "Mrs Noah and didactic abuses". Early Theatre. 5 (1): 11–36. doi:10.12745/et.5.1.623 (inactive 12 July 2025). JSTOR 43499152. Gale A228909147.
- Young, Wilfred (1957). "Noah and His Wife: A Note on Three English Miracle Plays". Hermathena (90): 17–32. JSTOR 23039504.
- Mill, Anna Jean (1941). "Noah's Wife Again". PMLA. 56 (3): 613–626. doi:10.2307/458985. JSTOR 458985. S2CID 163574912.
