= Noah's wine =

Colloquial allusion of biblical origin

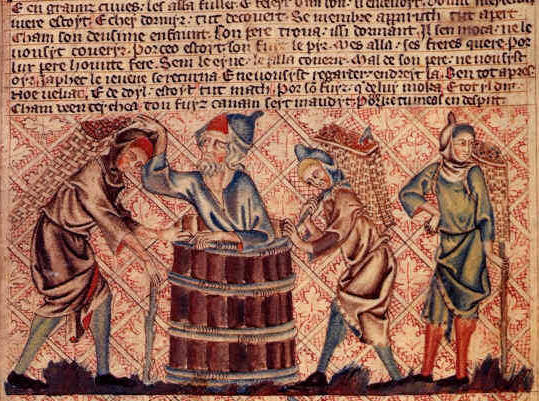
Miniature from the Holkham Bible, c. 1327-35, depicting Noah and his sons gathering and pressing grapes. The patterned background represents a vineyard. Surrounding text in Anglo-Norman. London, BL Add MS 47862, fol. 9r.

Noah's wine is a colloquial allusion meaning alcoholic beverages. The advent of this type of beverage and the discovery of fermentation are traditionally attributed, by explication from biblical sources, to Noah. The phrase has been used in both fictional and nonfictional literature.

== Definition and origin ==
In the Bible, the few chapters that come between the creation of Adam and the birth of Noah contain no mention of alcoholic drinks. After the account of the great flood, the biblical Noah is said to have cultivated a vineyard, made wine, and become intoxicated. Thus, the discovery of fermentation is traditionally attributed to Noah because this is the first time alcohol appears in the Bible. Noah's wine has been described as a "pleasant relief for man from the toilsome work of the crop".

There is debate as to whether certain references to wine in the Bible are actually to a non-intoxicating substance, but, at least in this passage, the Bible states Noah became drunk (Hebrew: ישכר yiškār) after consuming wine (יין yayin). It has been suggested that Noah's wine must have been drugged as it could not have been strong enough to cause him to become intoxicated. Rabbinic literature goes as far as to suggest that the grape vine-branch had its origins with Adam, and that Satan, along with fertilization using animal blood, played a part in the production of the wine. It blames those factors (especially the latter two) for the aforementioned potency of the wine.

From a biblical view, fermented beverages presumably spread throughout the world after Noah's supposed discovery, as alcoholic beverages are historically widespread. Some climates are not suited for the growing of grapes; hence it is purported that humanity was led to discover other means (e.g. beer) of not simply satisfying thirst but also stimulating the mind.

== Description and usage ==
A journal, at the end of the nineteenth century published the following: "Man has been defined, perhaps somewhat crudely, says Food and Cookery, as an animal that prefers a properly cooked meal to raw food, and Noah's wine to Adam's ale."

Madeleine L'Engle used the term in her 1986 novel, Many Waters, and David Garnett used the phrase in his 1963 novel, Two by Two: A Story of Survival. Elizabeth Barrett Browning's 1856 epic poem, Aurora Leigh has the following lines: "For everywhere/ We're too materialistic,—eating clay,/ (Like men of the west) instead of Adam's corn/ And Noah's wine."

A work criticizing drunkenness from 1899 states:

Noah survived one flood, only to be the source of another; a flood that for its disastrous results and heartrending consequences has outrivaled the flood of his preserver, for the sparkling, crimson fluid from Noah's wine press has ... [been the cause] of misery [for] millions of helpless, struggling, pitiful human objects, carrying them on and on to an ocean of woe—to a deep, dark sea of oblivion.

== See also ==
- Adam's ale – a term that refers to water
- Noah's Ark – the vessel in the Genesis flood narrative
- Alcohol in the Bible
