= The Persian Sibyl (Guercino) =

Painting by Guercino

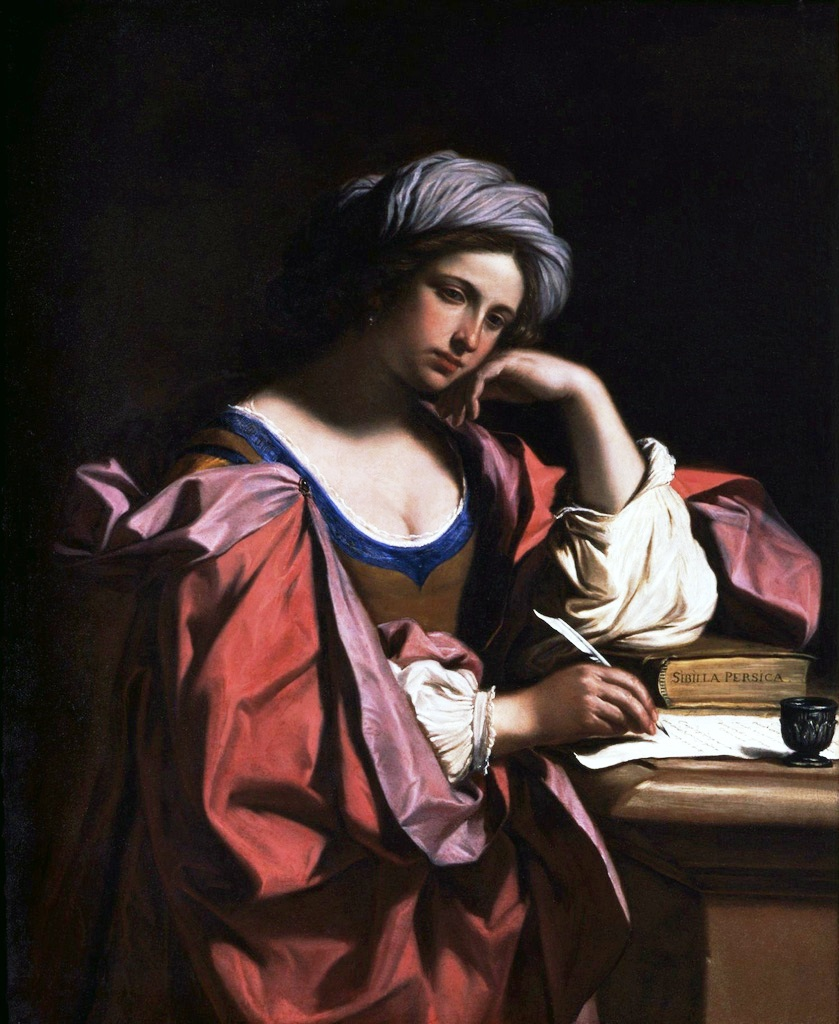
The Persian Sibyl (1647) by Guercino

The Persian Sibyl is a 1647 oil on canvas painting of the Persian Sibyl by Guercino, now in the Musei Capitolini in Rome.

== History ==
It was commissioned between 1645 and 1647 by Carlo Rondinelli, governor of Cento. The first definite mention of it is in the painter's account book, which shows the moment of payment for it on completion - 259 lire were paid, equal to just over 64 scudi. The date was two weeks after the completion of his The Phrygian Sibyl, commissioned for Girolamo Albergati, Bologna's ambassador to Rome, now in an English private collection: "On 6 June. Received from Sig. Co. Carlo Rondingelli Gov.re di Cento dopie d'Italia n. 17 1/2 [for] the Painting of the Persian Sibyl, which makes 259 lire - which was 64 scudi, 3 lire". The artist also painted The Libyan Sibyl (Royal Collection) and The Samian Sibyl (private collection) as a pair in 1651, along with another The Samian Sibyl in 1652-1653 (Palazzo Reale, Genoa).

The work entered the Pio di Savoia collection in the mid 17th century, acquired by cardinal Carlo Francesco between 1655 and 1663, during his time as papal legate to Ferrara, Rondinelli's birthplace. It was then displayed in 1697 as part of an annual display at San Salvatore in Lauro in Rome, entitled "A Sibyl by Guercino". It was still in the Pio collection in a 1724 inventory before being bought with the rest of the Pio collection by Pope Benedict XIV in 1750 for the city of Rome and its new Museo del Campidoglio (now the Musei Capitolini). The work then fell into obscurity for over 200 years due to several revarnishings which had deteriorated and it was even downgraded to a studio work by the brothers Cesare and Bartolomeo Gennari. The true attribution was only restored after a restoration in 1990-1991 which especially improved the visibility of the signature.
