= List of spiritual entities in Islam =

This is a list of spiritual entities in Islam. Islamic traditions and mythologies branching of from the Quran state more precisely, about the nature of different spiritual or supernatural creatures. According to a hadith attributed to ibn Abbas, God created four types of intelligent beings; those among whom all will be in paradise - they are the angels; all those who will be in hell-fire - they are the devils; and creatures both in paradise and hell - they are the jinn and humans. Most creatures can be assigned to these. Later, Muslims also accepted belief in undefined demons (dīv).

== A ==
- Abu Abdul al-Rahman, a jinn-king and son in law of Malik Gatshan, ascetic and devoted to the Kaaba. (Genie)
- Adiliob, friend of renewal of religion (Bid'ah). (Devil)
- Afra'il, the guardian angel of the seventh heaven. (Angel)
- Alheng, a prince of the righteous jinn during the reign of Solomon. (Genie)
- Amir, jinn dwelling in houses. (Genie)
- Angel, heavenly spirit created out of light. (Angel)
- Artiya'il, the angel who removes grief and depression from the children of Adam. (Angel)
- Arina'il, guardian angel of the third heaven. (Angel)
- Awar, a devil of lust, tempting into adultery. (Devil)
- Azazil, father of the devils, Satan. (Genie/Devil)
- Ayna, daughter of Satan. Married an apostate jinni. (Devil)
- Azrāʾīl (Azrael), the Angel of Death. (Archangel)

== B ==
- Batr, a devil making people appreciate slapping and screaming. (Devil)
- Bilquis, queen of Sheba, considered only partly human. (Human and Genie or Human and Fairy)
- Binn, predecessor of the jinn. Often paired with hinn. Extinct. (Demon)
- Bīwarāsp the Wise, jinn-king in the epistle The Case of the Animals versus Man, written by the Brethren of Purity. (Genie)
- Bubu, jinn seen by children. (Genie)
- Buraq, the winged horse-like heavenly ride that carried the Muhammad in his Night Ascension. (Other)

== C ==
- Cherubim (al-Karubiyyin), a class of angels dwelling in the sixth heaven, sometimes identified with the Muqarraboon. (Angels or Archangels)
- Chotrob, a devil tempting during prayer. (Devil)

== D ==
- Dābbat al-Arḍ, beast of the Earth, associated with apocalyptic events. (Other)
- Dasim, a devil causing enmity between husband and wife. (Devil)
- Dajjal, deceiver in the End-Times, False Prophet. (Devil or Other)
- Darda'il (The Journeyers), who travel the earth searching out assemblies where people remember God's name. (Angel)
- al-Dik, an angel in the shape of a rooster. He is responsible for the crowing of cockerels and announcing time. (Angel)
- Dhaqwan, an ifrit who tempted Solomon into carrying the throne of Bilqis. (Demon)
- Div, supernatural monsters, often endowed with magical abilities, but can be enslaved. Also the Indian deities. They could grant wishes in turn for worshipping them. (Demon)
- Dumah, an angel receiving the souls of the damned. (Angel)

== F ==
- Faqtash, a devil in the story of Solomon, who had broken a magical mirror given by God to Adam. Solomon commands the devil to retrieve it. (Devil)
- Futrus, a fallen angel and delegate of Hussain. He was cast out of heaven after he delayed a command, but rehabilitated by Muhammad. (Angel)

== G ==
- Gabriel, archangel who delivers messages between heaven and earth, warrior angel in the Battle of Badr. (Archangel)
- Ghaddar, a dog- or goat-like devil, mutilating the genitalia of men, expected to live in the desert. (Devil)
- Ghilman, also called Wildān are the perpetually youthful attendants in Jannah. (Human)
- Ghoul, shape-shifting jinni, who lurks on travellers, their scream leads them away from their path and then consumes their flesh. (Genie)

== H ==
- Habib, an angel created from fire and ice, consisting one half of fire and another half of snow. Both elements pass into each other without extinguishing. (Angel)
- Hamalat al-'Arsh, those who carry the 'Arsh (Throne of God), in the seventh heaven. Comparable to the Seraphim. (Angels)
- Harahil, angel responsible for the night. (Angel)
- Ham ibn Him ibn Laqis ibn Iblis, grandson of Iblis, exception among the devils, who followed the prophets. (Devil)
- Harut and Marut, testing angels sent to test the people of Babylon by offering to teach them magic, but not before clarifying; “We are only a trial [sent to you], so do not disbelieve [by learning magic from us],” mentioned in the Quran. (Angels)
- Hanzab and Hadis, devils who distract Muslims from prayers. (Devils)
- Hinn, either a weak class of jinn or their predecessor. (Genie or Demon)
- Houri, beautiful and pure beings of Paradise. (Human)

== I ==
- Iblis, leader of the devils, Satan. (Genie/Devil)
- Ifrit, cunning demon of the underworld, also associated with ghosts of the dead. (Demon)
- Inhabitants of the third earth, creatures supposed to have faces like humans but with the mouth of a dog, feet of cows and ears like goats. They never disobey God. (Other)
- Isma'il, guardian angel of the first heaven, this angel offers advice to the believers on earth and prays for them. (Angel)
- Israfil, the archangel who will blow into the trumpet to signal Qiyamah, in the seventh heaven. (Archangel)

== J ==
- Jann, either a type of jinn or ancestor of the jinn. (Genie)
- Jinn, invisible being, like humans, created with fitra. Their destiny depends on God's Judgement on the Day of Resurrection. (Genie)
- Jundullah, army of angels who helped Muhammad in the battlefield. (Angels)

== K ==
- Kabkab, a devil causing trouble to people. (Devil)
- Kalqa’il, guardian of the fifth heaven. (Angel)
- Khanas, a devil flowing through the veins of the sons of Adam. (Devil)
- Khartafush, a jinni who betrayed his father and joined the army of devils, after he married the daughter of Iblis. (Genie)
- Khidr, sometimes regarded as an angel who took human form and thus able to reveal hidden knowledge exceeding those of the prophets to guide and help people or prophets. (Angel or Human)
- Katahur, a jinni who spied Solomon for a demon-king. (Genie)
- Kiraman Katibin (Raqib and Atid ) (Honourable Recorders), one records the good deeds and one records the bad deeds of Humans. (Angels)

== L ==
- Laqis, lord of fire-worshippers. (Devil)

== M ==
- Maalik, chief of the angels guarding Hellfire (jahannam), mentioned in the Quran. (Angel)
- Malik Gatshan, king of all jinn living on Mount Qaf. (Genie)
- Marid, a powerful rebellious demon, who assaults heaven in order to listen to the angels, mentioned in Quran. (Demon)
- Matatrush, angel guarding the heavenly veil. Jews are blamed for venerating this angel on Rosh Hashanah as a son of god. (Angel)
- Mika'il, guardian angel of the second heaven. (Angel)
- Mikha'il, archangel of mercy, bestows earth with rain. (Archangel)
- Mihraz al-Ahmar, a devil, who dries water and causes noses to bleed. (Devil)
- Mu'aqqibat or Hafaza (The Protectors/Guardian angel), protect from demons and devils, bring down blessings. (Angels)
- Muwakkil, ambiguous beings, at times described as angels and sometimes as jinn. They are said to guard the names of God and assist pious people who perform dhikr. Probably deriving from Medieval cosmographic and esoteric teachings. (Angels, Genie, or Other)
- Munkar and Nakir, question the dead in their graves. (Angels)

== N ==
- Nasnas, a half-demon, considered offspring of the div. (Demon)
- Nāzi'āt, taking the soul from the infidel in the most painful way. (Angel)
- Nāshiṭāt, taking the soul of the believers in the most gentle way. (Angel)

== P ==
- Peri, usually benevolent spirits. Supposed to have been created before the jinn but after the div. (Fairy)

== Q ==
- Qareen, a spiritual double of human. Only a companion in the Quran. (Demon or Other)

== R ==
- Rafraf, heavenly ride that carried Muhammad beyond the heavens. (Other)
- Ramyail, an angel receiving the souls of the believers. (Angel)
- Riḍwan, guardian angel of the gates of heaven. (Angel)
- Ruh, spirit, sometimes also an archangel in the highest heaven. (Archangel or Other)

== S ==
- Sakhr, a king of the jinn, sometimes of demons (div). Appears in the legend of Solomon. (Genie or demon)
- Salsa'il, guardian angel of the fourth heaven. (Angel)
- Shamka'il, an angel of the sixth heaven. (Angel)
- Sharahil, angel responsible for the day and the sun, Sarahiel. (Angel)
- Shayateen, evil spirits, tempting humans into sin. Usually the offspring of Iblis, sometimes spirits cast out of heaven. (Genie or Devils)
- Sila, shape-shifter, often female. Like ghoul, they try to seduce travellers to leave the road and assault them later. They can not shift their hooves. (Genie)
- Susail, angel of hell, who shows Muhammad the first layer of punishment during his Night Journey. (Angel)
- Sut, a devil inspiring lies. (Devil)

== U ==
- Ummu's-sibyan (mother of children), she is considered the mother of Changelings and compared to Lilith and Lamia. (demon)

== W ==
- Wasnan, makes people sleepy, so they miss the morning prayer. (Devil)
- Wassin, ruler over grief and anxiety. (Devil)
- Walhan, a devil who causes Muslims to waste water during ritual purification. (Devil)

== Y ==
- Yajuj and Majuj, two tribes, associated with armageddon. (Human)
- Yusuf ibn Yasif, last messenger sent to the jinn in pre-Adamite times. Supposed to be killed in a cauldron of copper filled with oil for delivering a message of God. (Genie)

== Z ==
- Zabaniyah, torture the sinners in Hellfire. (Angels)
- Zalambur, a devil tempting people into dishonesty. (Devil)
- Zār, group of jinn, mostly malevolent. Associated with possession. (Genie)

== See also ==
- Islamic mythology
- List of characters and names mentioned in the Quran
- List of angels in theology
- List of theological demons
- Heaven in Islam
- Hell in Islam
