= Shayatin =

Devils in Islam

Depiction of a shayṭān by Siyah Qalam, c. 14th/15th century. The art-style of Uighur or Central Asia origin was used by Muslim Turks to depict various legendary beings.

Shayāṭīn (Arabic: شَيَاطِين shayāṭīn; sing. شَيْطَان shayṭān) refers to a class of evil spirits in Islam, inciting humans and jinn to sin by whispering (وَسْوَسَة waswasa) in their hearts (قَلْب qalb). According to Islamic tradition, though invisible to humans, shayāṭīn are imagined to be ugly and grotesque creatures created from the fires of hell.

The Quran speaks of various ways the shayāṭīn tempt humans into sin. They may teach sorcery, float below the heavens to steal the news of the angels, or lurk near humans without being seen. Several hadith tell of how the shayāṭīn are responsible for various calamities that affect personal life. Both the hadith literature and Arab folklore usually speak of the shayāṭīn in abstract terms, describing their evil influence only. According to hadith, during Ramadan they are said to be chained up.

In Islamic theology, the influence of the shayāṭīn on humans is elaborated as an internal struggle against the noble angels, often described in the invisible reality called alam al-mithal or alam al-malakut. On a narrative perspective, Islamic traditions disagrees whether the shayāṭīn are simply misguided jinn, or a separate class of being. The latter position often identifies them with the terrestrial angels who defied Adam as a governor of Earth and become enemies of mankind. (Note: Die Teufel sind die gefallenen Engel, welche sich mit Iblis weigerten auf Befehl Gottes den Adam, sich vor ihm niederwerfend, zu verehren, sie heissen in der vielfachen Zahl Schejathin, in der einfachen Zahl Scheitan Satan, welchem Wort immer ein Fluch oder das Wort redschim, d.i. der zu Steinigende, beigesetzt wird, (...). The devils are the fallen angels who, along with Iblis, refused to worship Adam by prostrating themselves before him at God's command. They are called shayāṭīn in multiple numbers, and shayṭān Satan in single numbers, to which word a curse or the word redschim, i.e., the one to be stoned, is always added, (...))

== Etymology and history ==
The term shayāṭīn roughly corresponds to the English words "demons", "satans", or "devils". The Arabic term šayṭān originated from the triliteral root š-ṭ-n ("distant, astray") and is cognate to Satan. It has a theological connotation designating a creature distant from the divine mercy. As a spirit, it can refer both to pre-Islamic jinn as well as satans comparable to the Jewish tradition.

In pre-Islamic usage, the term is attested in Geʽez. In the Book of Enoch, "angels of punishment prepare the instruments for the säyəṭanə". Similarly to the Quranic usage, the term referred to the hosts of Satan. Book of Jubilees mentions the shayṭān Mastema, who commands over evil spirits (manafəsəta).

Besides referring to a specific entity, the term shayāṭīn is also applied to any being who rebels against God. This can be from among the jinn as well as humans. The template for this descriptive character of the term is already provided by the Quran. In Surah 6:112, the Quran speaks about shayāṭīn from al-ins wa al-jinn (humans and jinn). (Note: From T. Nünlist (2015) Dämonenglaube im Islam translation: (in English) "Rather, it argues that the term "sayatin" stands for a fundamentally evil character trait and refers to Sura 6.112 (...). From these explanations, it follows that the term "sayatin" does not a priori designate a species of spiritual being. Rather, the term "saytan" has a moral connotation. "Saytan" (pl. sayatin) primarily denotes a character trait and refers to the bad, rebellious, evil, and disobedient." original: (in German) "Sie vertritt vielmehr die Auffassung, der Ausdruck sayatin stehe für eine in ihren Grundzügen üble Charaktereigenschaft und verweist auf Sure 6.112 (...) Aus diesen Ausführungen ergibt sich, dass der Ausdruck sayatin nicht a priori eine Gattung von Geistwesen bezeichnet. Vielmehr ist mit dem Begriff saytan eine moralische Konnotation verbunden. Saytan (pl. sayatin bezeichnet primär einen Charakterzug und meint die Schlechten, Rebellischen, Bösen, und Ungehorsamen.")

Jacques Waardenburg argued that jinn underwent a transition from neutral spirits to demons through the progress of Qur‘anic revelation whereby substituting jinn by the shayāṭīn, and explains by that the absence of jinn mentioned in Medinan Surahs and presence of multiple satans whereas Christian tradition knows only one satan. Accordingly, the multitude of devils may have been adopted from previous jinn-beliefs.

Paul Arno Eichler, however, held this theory unconvincing; since the idea of a multitude of shayāṭīn already existed in Judeo-Christian tradition, independent from jinn-beliefs. (Note: translation: (in English) "The idea that Satan drew a whole hosts into his fall is known as the Jewish concept and is still read from the Bible by Christian sects today. It is not correct to say that the idea of a multiple satans can be traced back to the adoption of jinn into the Islamic idea of Satan, as Goldziher proposed. Muhammad took the idea of multiple satans from the biblical religions. It merely found support by certain ideas of djinn, but only the [non-Quranic] demonic jinn come into consideration for this. There is not a single passage in the Quran that gives rise to the assumption that the unbelieving jinn would become "Shaitans"; this can only be shown by the demonic jinn. original: (in German) "Der Gedanke, dass der Satan eine ganze Schar in seinen Sturz hineingezogen habe, ist als jüdische Auffassung bekannt und wird von christlichen Sekten auch heute noch aus der Bibel herausgelesen. Dass die Vorstellung von einer Mehrheit von Satanen auf die Eingliederung der Dschinn in die Satansvorstellung zurückzuführen sei, wie Goldziher meint, ist nicht richtig. Die Vorstellung von einer Mehrheit von Satanen hat Muhammad von den biblischen Religionen übernommen. Sie hat dann in der Eingliederung von gewissen Dschinn eine Stütze gefunden. Hierfür kommen aber einzig die dämonischen Dschinn in Betracht. Es gibt keine einzige Stelle im Koran Anlass zu der Annahme, dass die ungläubigen Dschinn etwa zu "Schaitanen" würden, dass lässt sich nur von den dämonischen Dschinn zeigen.") Generally, the term šayṭān appears in traditions associated with Jewish and Christian narratives, while the term jinn represents entities of polytheistic background. (Note: From T. Nünlist (2015) Dämonenglaube im Islam translation: (in English) "Simplified, it can be stated that devils and Iblis appear in reports with Jewish background. Depictions, whose actors are referred to as jinn are generally located apart from Judeo-Christian traditions." original: (in German) "Vereinfacht lässt sich festhalten, dass Satane und Iblis in Berichten mit jüdischem Hintergrund auftreten. Darstellungen, deren Akteure als jinn bezeichnet werden, sind in der Regel außerhalb der jüdischen-christlichen Überlieferung zu verorten.")

In the Qur’an, the existence of the shayāṭīn, like that of jinn, is taken for granted. While the jinn are autonomous spirits of pre-Islamic Arabian beliefs, the shayāṭīn are primarily adversaries of the believers („satans“). The origin and theological purpose of the shayāṭīn is then explained through the figure of al-šayṭān (the Devil). Through analysis of textual criticism, Karl-Friedrich Pohlmann argues that the Quranic figure of the primary Devil was a later redaction in order to offer a theological explanation for the opposition towards Islam told through the concept of satans and a respond to discussions regarding the origin of evil (unde malum?).

The narratives about the primary devil reveal strong parallelism to Judeo-Christian traditions, particularly Vitae Adam et Eva which may have served as a foundation of theological speculations. The Devil embodies the characteristics of the lesser devils. Muslim authors‘s iteration of the story reveals that, although the Devil had been dismissed by God, even after his fall, the Devil cannot operate independently from God. This might have been a direct reaction to implied deficiencies in God’s omnipotence in the Christian apocrypha.

The shayāṭīn are thus an embodiment of opposition and hostility, imagined to be still operating and initiated only by the power of an omnipotent God. Only a few Muslim denominations, such as the Mu’tazilah, favored the independence of shayāṭīn over God‘s omnipotence for upholding God‘s justice.

== In the Quran ==
In the Quran, shayāṭīn are mentioned approximately as often as angels. The shayāṭīn are mentioned less frequently than Šayṭān, but they are equally hostile to God's order (sharīʿa). They teach sorcery to humans (2:102), inspire their friends to dispute with the faithful (6:121), make evil suggestions (23:97) towards both humans and jinn (6:112), and secretly listen to the council of the angels (Quran 15:16–18). Quran 26:95 speaks about the junud Iblīs, the invisible hosts of Iblīs (comparable to the junud of angels fighting along Muhammad in Quran 9:40).

Despite their reluctant nature, the shayāṭīn are ultimately under God's command and do not form their own party. According to the Islamic doctrine of tawḥīd, both good and evil are prescribed by God. Quran 2:168 explicitly warns people not to follow the Šayṭān, implying that humans are free to choose between the path of God or the one of Šayṭān. However, Šayṭān only promises delusion and there is no success in following his path (4:120). In the Quranic story of Iblīs, who represents the shayāṭīn in the primordial fall, shows that they are subordinative to and created by God, by means of functioning as tempters. Šayṭān can only act with God's permission (58:10). God tasks the shayāṭīn as companions to the misbelievers (7:27), and to incite them against each other (19:83). After convincing sinners to remain in their disbelief, the shayāṭīn betray their followers when faced with God's judgement (Quran 3:175;8:48; 43:38).

== In the ḥādīth literature ==
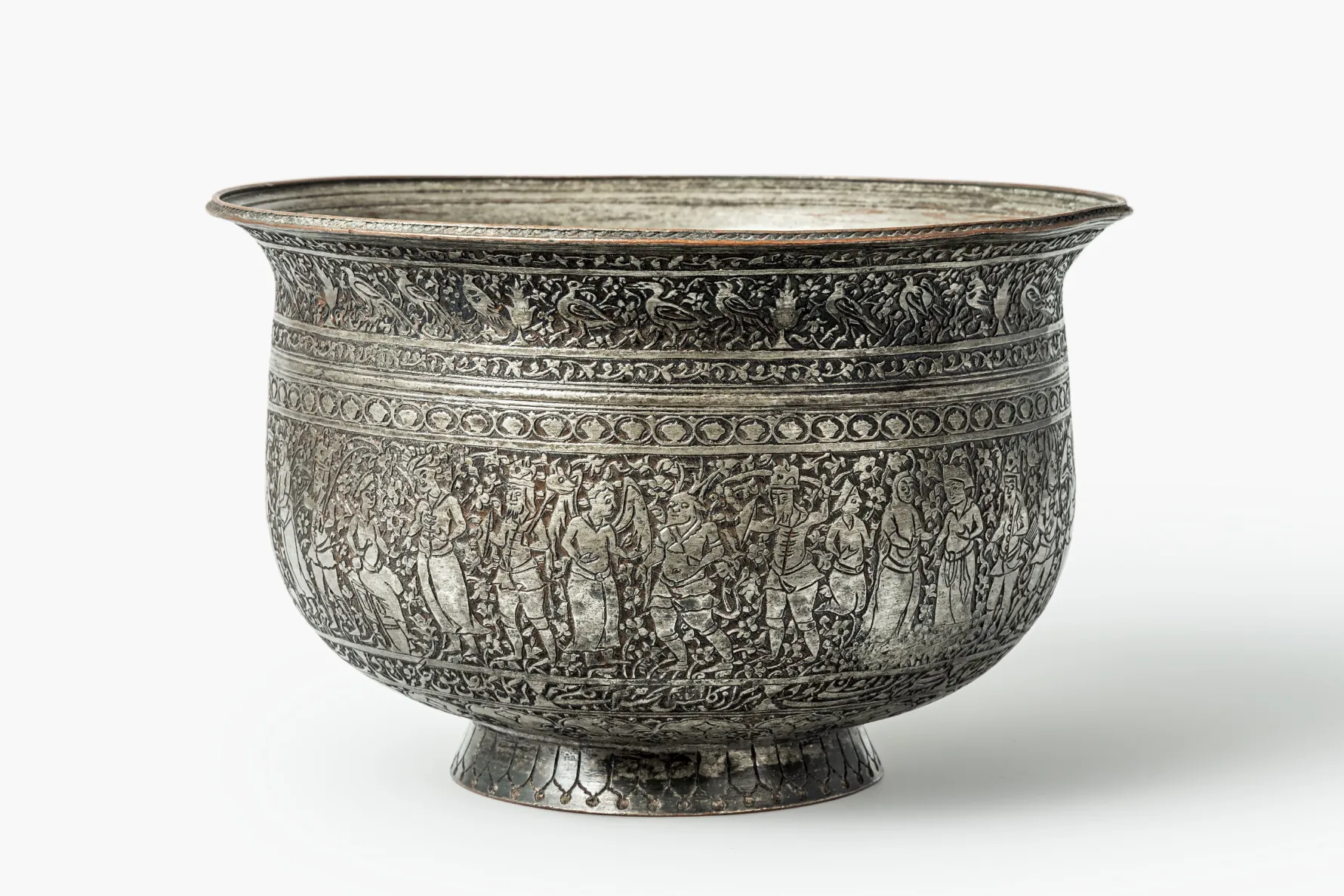
Bowl with humans, angels, and divs (demons). Iran Qajar dynasty, 1215–1221 A.H. (1800-1805). Museum für Kunst und Gewerbe Hamburg, Germany. This bowl depicts humans, angels, and horned creatures called div. Divs embody evil, disrupt order and represent vices such as pride and anger. They still appear in literature and art today as symbols of chaos and inner conflict.

The ḥādīth speak about shayāṭīn as malevolent forces, linked to the psychological life of humans. The emphasis on the devils' evil nature, sometimes veils the Quranic depiction of the shayāṭīn as forces under God's control. However, ḥādīth clarify that God is ultimately in control of both angels and devils and that only God decides whom the devils can lead to hell.

Sometimes, specific devils are considered to be tasked with disturbing specific spheres of human activities. Eminent among them are: Dasim assigned to causing troubles between married couples; Awar, who incites people to commit illicit sexual intercourse (zinā); Sut, who inspires lies and gossip; Tir causing injuries; and Zalambur, assigned to the market and presiding over dishonest and fraudulent business transactions.

Although the ḥādīth describe the devils mostly as evil influences, they indicate that they are composed of a body. The shayāṭīn are said to eat with their left hand, therefore Muslims are advised to eat with their right hand (Sahih Muslim Book 23 No. 5004). Shayāṭīn, although invisible, are depicted as immensely ugly (Sahih Muslim Book 26 No. 5428). The sun is said to set and rise between the horns of a shayṭān and during this moment, the doors to hell are open, thus Muslims should not pray at this time (Sahih Muslim 612d Book 5, Hadith 222). Satan and his minions battle the angels of mercy over the soul of a sinner; however, they are referred to as "angels of punishment" instead of shayāṭīn (Sahih Muslim 612d: Book 21, Hadith 2622).

However, the ḥādīths also describe the limits of shayāṭīn. Ritual purity is said to attract angels and fend off shayāṭīn, while shayāṭīn are attracted to impurity, filthy, and desacralized places. Before reciting the Quran, Muslims should take wudu/abdest and seek refuge in God from the shayāṭīn. Reciting specific prayers (Note: like "A'uzu Billahi Minesh shaitanir Rajiim" or specific Surahs of the Quran, like "An-Naas" or "Al-Falaq") is further believed to protect against the shayāṭīn. If a shayṭān successfully interrupts a ritual Muslim prayer, the Muslim has to prostrate two times and continue (Sahih Bukhari 4:151). During Ramadan the shayāṭīn are chained in hell (Sahih al-Bukhari 1899). Shayāṭīn are sent by Iblis to cause misery among humans and return to him for report (Muslim 8:138). A shayṭān is said to tempt humans through their veins (Muslim 2174).

== Theology (Kalām) ==
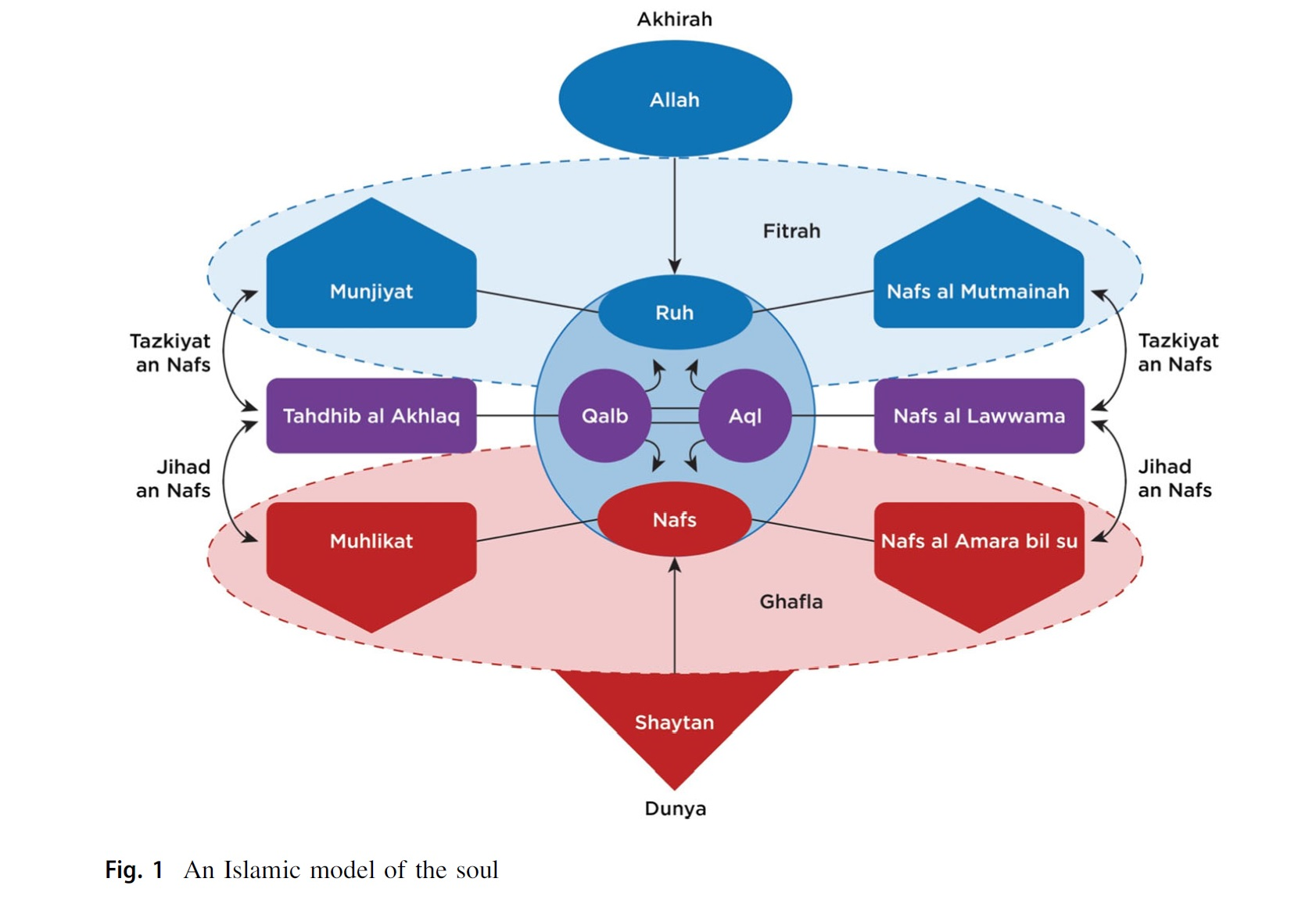
A visual rendition of the Islamic model of the soul showing the position of "nafs" relative to other concepts, based on a consensus of 18 surveyed academic and religious experts

Islamic theology usually accepts three types of invisible creatures: angels (malāʾikah), djinn, and devils (šayāṭīn). While good jinn rarely draw the attention of scholars of the Quran (mufassirūn), the supposed negative influence of evil jinn and devils on humans are studied in depth. The evil jinn are distinguished from shayāṭīn by their attributes: Whereas jinn share common characteristics with humans (i.e. they are mortal and die, follow different religions, and can, at least theoretically, be converted to Islam), the shayāṭīn are exclusively evil and are immortal until Judgement Day. Furthermore, the father of the jinn is al-Jann and the father of the shayāṭīn is Iblis. (Note: A minority of scholars, such as Hasan Basri and Muqatil ibn Sulayman, disagreed with this view, holding that Iblis is both the father of the jinn and shayāṭīn and accordingly equated with Al-Jann. The Mu'tazila, inspired by the disciples of Hasan Basri, are said to hold that not shayāṭīn, but jinn, whisper to humans. Simultaneously, demonic possession, commonly associated with the jinn, is rejected.) Like the jinn, the shayāṭīn are supposed to be created from fire, because their leader claims to be made from fire (nār). It is probably this supposed substance they share with the jinn, which allows them to ascend into the air in an attempt to listen to the angels. Devils in turn differ from the angels by that the former are created for disobedience, but the latter for goodness.

Details about the negative influences of the devils largely derive from the Quran and the ḥadīṯ. The devils promote their own sinful characteristics among humans, including pride, envy, acquisitiveness, anger, lust, and gluttony. Some scholars explained their influences from a rationalistic perspective. According to al-Ghazali (c. 1058 – 1111), humans were to discover temptations within themselves, described as devilish whisperings (waswās). Such devilish whisperings are of the same nature than inspirations (ilhām) of the angels. The only difference between ilhām and waswās lies in the cause: Ilhām is caused by an angel and inspires good that benefits humanity, while waswās is caused by a devil (šayṭān) and inspires sin mostly to enrich the ego. A similar conceptualization on angels and devils is given by Ali Hujwiri, Al-Baydawi, and Ibn Tufail.

=== Traditionalistic ===
The traditionalist account on the structure of the world is deeply embedded in the larger context of Middle Eastern mythological cosmology. In contrast to the philosophical and some views deriving from speculative theology (Kalām), which agrees with Hellenistic cosmology on the distinction between a lower material world and an unchanging celestial world, the traditionalists describe both the earthly world and the heavens as composed of material nature. In traditionalist cosmology, the devils are strongly associated with the underworld, especially the seventh earth.

In traditionalist cosmology, the heavens span in a dome-like structure over the earths, arranged in horizontal layers one upon another. At top stands the Throne of God (Al-ʽArsh) separated from the seven heavens below. The sun is created from the same fire from which the devils were made and the stars in heaven protect against assaulting devils. Below the heavens follow the seven earths. The earths are likewise also part of the supernatural cosmos and serve as gradual stages of hell. The surface is inhabited by humans and djinn, the lower stages are the abode of destructive winds followed by brimstones of hell, scorpions and vipers, and eventually the devils at the bottom. As inhabitants of the lowest earth, the devils stand in opposition to God's throne in the highest heaven. Iblis is chained at the very bottom, referred to as Sijjin or Saqar, and from where he sends his demons to the surface. From time to time, God allows Iblis to be free for a limited time interval and the stars are created for protection of the heavens against the devils.

=== Philosophical ===
Al-Ghazali reconciles the literal meaning (Ẓāhir) with Avicennan cosmology based on reason. According to the philosophers (falsafa), the word 'angel' refers to "celestial intellects" or "immaterial souls". Ghazali opined that devils might be of a similar nature, that is, that they are celestial immaterial objects influencing human minds. By that, Ghazali does not mean to deny the reality of devils, rather that devils can only be known by their impact. In his response to the question, how devils, who are conceptualized as creatures of a subtile body (i.e. either fallen angels or evil jinn) in early kalām, can run through the body of humans, he explains that it is not the devil himself, but the effects of the devil (athar ash-shayṭān) that run through human body and influence the soul. According to the Islamic conception of the cosmos, such inspirations are not worldly, but are considered to derive from the celestial realm (malakūt). However, devils attempt to distract a human's mind towards earthly matters, drawing it back to the material world. As explained in his The Alchemy of Happiness, the devils also manifest in the afterlife as embodiments of the earthly temptations encountered during life, as means of torture. In his work The Incoherence of the Philosophers, he explains that the afterlife is a manifestation of earthly pleassures and pains perceived as real once the deceased enter the abode of the dead.

According to Al-Baydawi, beneath the celestial intellects, there are terrestrial angels, both good and evil (al-kurūbiyyūn and al-s̲h̲ayāṭīn), and jinn. The angels inspire people to do either good or bad, depending on their own attitude. In his tafsīr, the al-kurūbiyyūn are identified with the celestial angels however. Where he explains fire to be a form of tainted light, thus symbolizing the blurring effect the devils have on human spirituality. In his Hayy ibn Yaqdhan, Ibn Tufail places the terrestrial angels, one advising good the other evil, beneath the celestial angels but above the jinn. Ibn Barrajan identifies the angels of light with the angels of mercy, but angels created from fire, with the angels of torment. The latter would have opposed the creation of humanity and belong to the angelic tribe of Iblis, called al-jinn. According to Fakhr al-Din al-Razi, angels and devils are distinct: the angels are characterized by their superiority which leads them to constant devotion and obedience, whereas the superiority and seniority of the devils drives them to defy God's command to bow before Adam.

Some scholars differentiate between the waswās al-shayṭān and waswās al-nafs ("vices" also called dīv in Persian literature). Al-Hakim al-Tirmidhi argues that the latter are internal to humans and result from passion (hawā). Others equate nafs and the whisperings of the shayāṭīn. Najm al-Din Kubra states "the lower soul, Satan, and the angels are not external things to you; rather they are you".

Athari scholar (al-atharīyah) Ibn Qayyim al-Jawziyya (1292–1350) elaborates on three possible states of a human soul (heart), depending on its relationship with devils: the first one is devoid of ʾīmān (faith), the devil does not whisper since he is already in complete control of that soul; the second heart is illuminated by ʾīmān, the devil whispers to, sometimes winning and sometimes losing; the third heart is brimming with ʾīmān and light (nūr) like heaven, from which the veils of passion have been lifted, so whenever a devil were to approach this heart, the devils are burned by a meteor when they approach.

== Popular culture ==
In 2008 Hasan Karacadağ published the movie Semum about one of the shayāṭīn. (Note: Translation: (in English) "Based on a hadith, Karacadağ argued that Semum was not a Jinn and came from the same lineage as Satan." Original: (in Turkish) Karacadağ, bir hadisten yola çıkarak Semum'un bir Cin olmadığını ve Şeytan ile aynı soydan geldiğini savundu.) The shayṭān was released from hell. Jealous of humans, the shayṭān seeks out to harm and torment humans, and takes possession over the body of a woman. The movie deals with questions regarding good and evil in Islamic thought.

The shayṭān of the movie describes himself as a loyal servant of ʿAzāzīl (another name of Satan in Islamic tradition), whom he venerates as a deity after feeling forgotten by God. However, in accordance with the teachings of the Quran, Azazil turns out to be unreliable, while God ultimately intervenes on behalf of those who stayed loyal. By that, the movie validates belief in the Islamic core doctrine of tawḥīd when confronted with unknown challenges and evil.

== See also ==
- Asrestar
- Dajjal
- Ghoul
- Marid
- Qareen
- Seven deadly sins
- Superstitions in Muslim societies
