= Harut and Marut =

Pair of fallen angels mentioned in the Quran

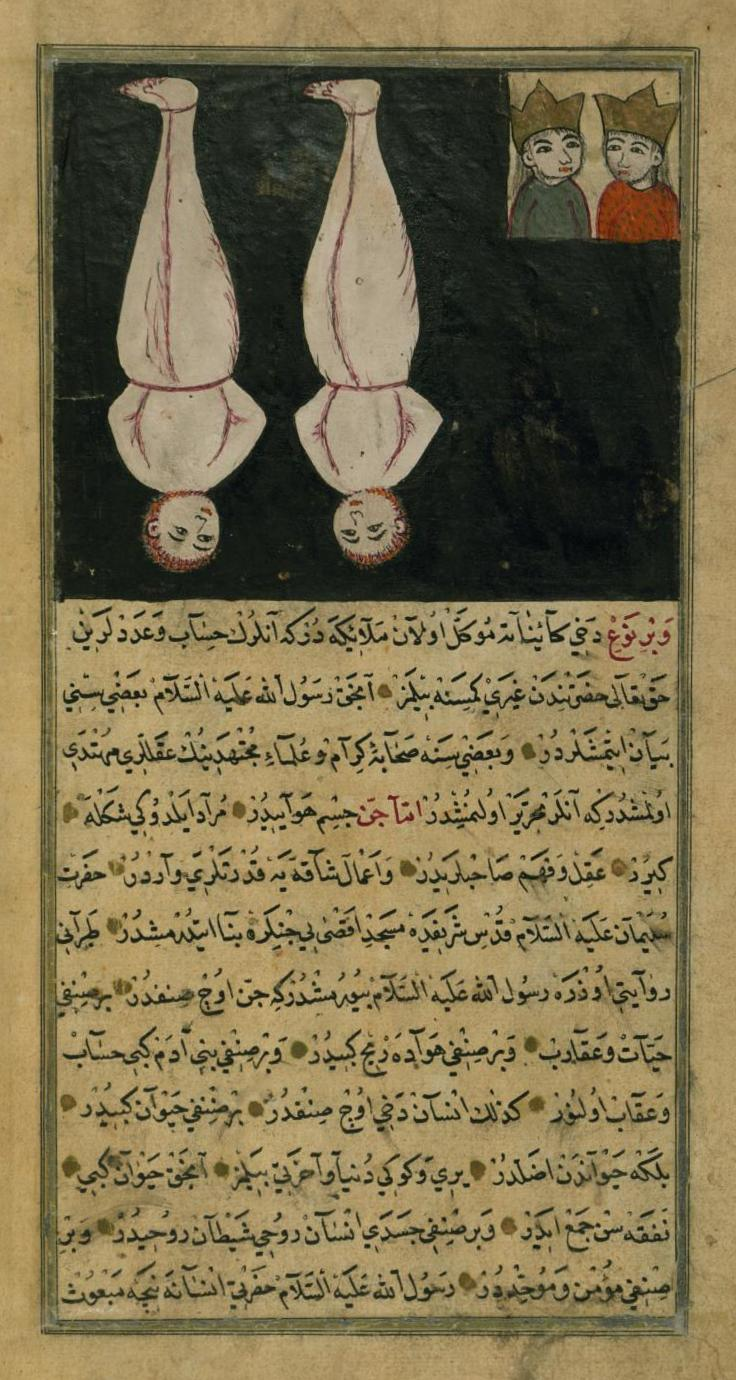
Harut and Marut hanging as punishment for being critical of Adam's fall in an image from 1717 CE (1121 AH)

Harut and Marut (Arabic: هَارُوْت وَمَارُوْت, romanized: Hārūt wa-Mārūt) are a pair of angels mentioned in the Quran Surah 2:102, who teach the arts of sorcery (siḥr) in Babylon. According to Islamic mythology, when Harut and Marut complained about mankind's wickedness, they were sent to earth in order to compete against humankind in regards to obedience. After they committed various crimes, they found themselves unable to return to heaven. God offered them a choice between punishment on earth or in hell. They decided for punishment on earth, leading to their situation mentioned in the Quran.

The story of Harut and Marut is a legend developed in folklore, influenced by Jewish and other older stories about fallen angels. Classical commentators sometimes mention versions of it but also point out connecting chains are weak. Therefore, the given narrations are not clear or agreed-upon creed between Islamic scholars.

The story became subject of a theological dispute in Islam. Reports about the trial and subsequent punishment go back to Muhammad and the earliest companions. However, some later Muslim theologians argue that angels could not commit sins and thus reject the story of Harut and Marut. Depending on the reading of the Quran (Qira'at), Harut and Marut are depicted as "two kings" instead. These kings would have learned sorcery from the devils and then taught it to the rest of mankind. An alternative attempt to protect Harut and Marut from sin while also affirming their angelic status describes them as angels who taught licit forms of magic, while the devils taught illicit magic.

Some Muslim theologians relate the complaint of Harut and Marut to the angels disputing in Surah 2:30. Accordingly, when God declares to create Adam, the angels are puzzled by that decision and argue that they do better than humans. The event of their story would take place after this announcement. The majority of Muslim scholars however, set their fall after the creation of Adam.

== Quran ==
=== Readings ===
In the Quran, Harut and Marut are mentioned briefly in Surah 2:102. There are different readings and interpretations of the verses. The Study Quran translates the verse as follows:

Solomon did not disbelieve, but the satans disbelieved, teaching people sorcery and that which was sent down to the two angels at Babylon, Harūt and Marūt. But they would not teach anyone until they had said, "We are only a trial, so do not disbelieve." Then they would learn from them that by which they could cause separation between a man and his wife. But they did not harm anyone with it, save by God's Leave. And they would learn that which harmed them and brought them no benefit, knowing that whosoever purchases it has no share in the Hereafter. Evil is that for which they sold their souls, had they but known.

— The Qur'an, 2:102.

According to the reading attributed to Hasan al-Basri (642–728), Harut and Marut are "two kings" (Arabic: ملكين, romanized: malikayn), and not two angels (malakayn).

Alternatively, a reading attributed to ibn Abbas reads the term mā (Arabic: ما), as "not" instead of "what":

"The devils believed not, they taught men sorcery and not what was sent down to the two angels at Babel, Harut and Marut."

In his commentary, Tabari (839–923 CE) puts forth an argument that mā ("not") refers to the angels Gabriel and Michael, and not to Harut and Marut. In line with Hasan al-Basri's reading, Harut and Marut are ordinary men, who learned sorcery from the devils. This exegetical approach is similar to the reinterpretation of the Bənē hāʾĔlōhīm mentioned in the Book of Genesis; depicting them as ordinary humans (sons of Cain and Seth) instead of as angels. However, most early commentators of the Quran regard Harut and Marut as angels.

Another variance can be found in a reading attributed to ibn Abbas. Accordingly, mā ("not") refers to the angels Harut and Marut, meaning that the devils taught men unlawful sorcery instead of the lawful things taught by the angels Harut and Marut. This reading is rather unconvincing as the verse depicts Harut and Marut as testers, implying that these angels taught something unlawful. Tabari explains that this interpretation is best be understood as, that there are two kinds of magic; lawful sent down by angels and unlawful taught by devils. He defends this interpretation on the authority of Ibn Wahb, arguing that God creates both good and evil.

=== Exegesis ===
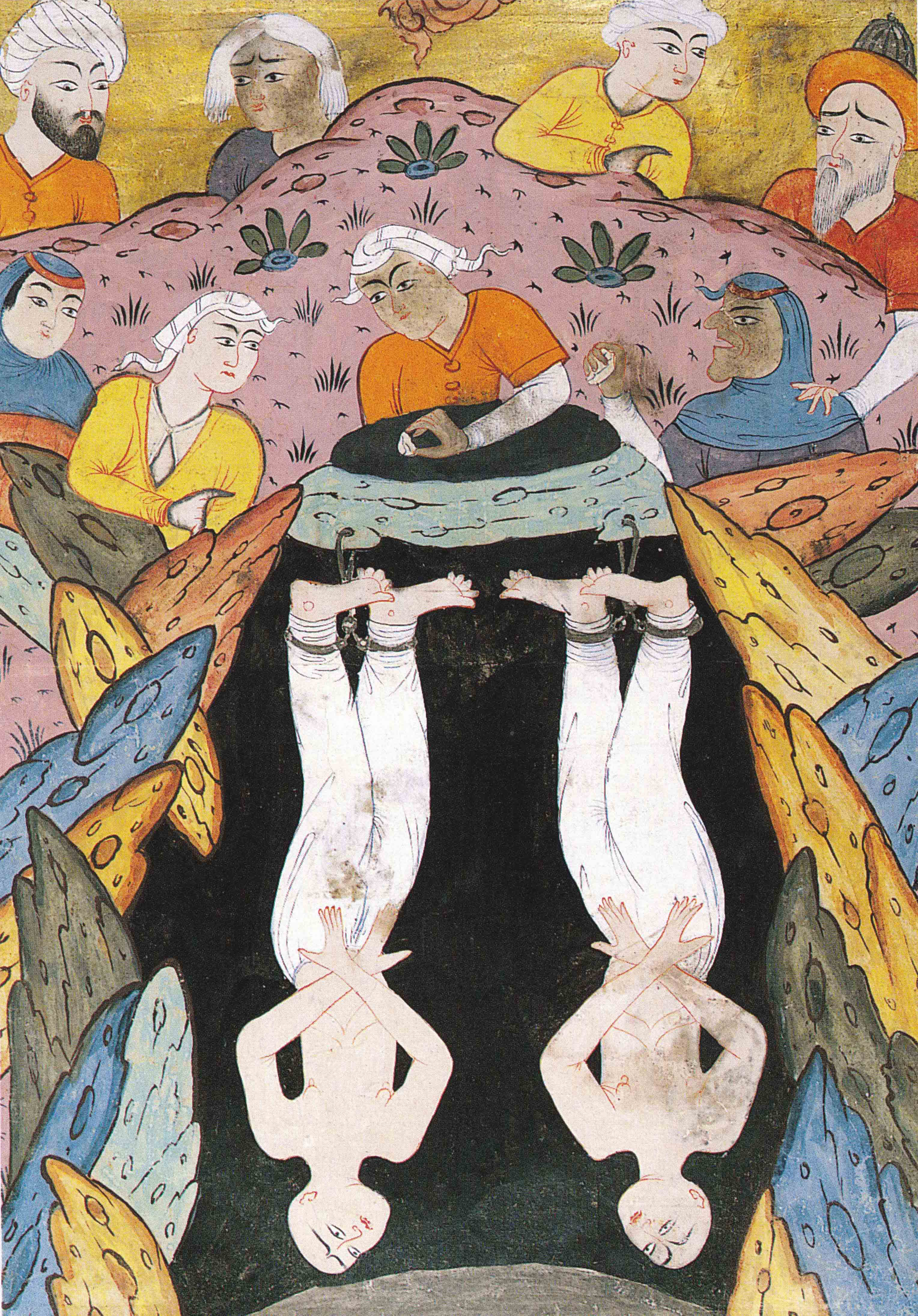
Harut and Marut in Their Forever Well (1703)

Harut and Marut are portrayed as the origin of magical practises in the world and by that, explain magic to be of otherworldly origin. From a theological viewpoint, Harut and Marut are a form of temptation, similar to the satans (šayāṭīn). They are also described in the Stories of the Prophetsʾ (Qiṣaṣ al-Anbiyā) and seen as a symbol for "enchanting love".

According to most Classical commentators, when the angels observed the wickedness of mankind, chose Harut and Marut as their representative in order to proof they would do better than humans. A minority relates Harut and Marut to the events in Surah 2:30, when the angels complain about the creation of Adam.

==== Tale of Harut and Marut ====
The tale of Harut and Marut (qiṣṣat Hārūt wa-Mārūt) is a recurring story throughout Quranic exegesis (Tabari, ibn Hanbal, Rumi, Maqdisi, Tha'labi, Kisa'i, Suyuti) to explain the earthly abode of this angelic pair. There are different variances of the same story with additional details. They all contain a prolegomenon in heaven, resulting in an angelic mission to earth, followed by a corruption of these angels, and consequent punishment by God. In some variations, not two, but three angels are send down to earth. In Rumi's (1207 – 1273) Masnavi, God tests three angels. However, once on earth one of them suspects to fail and returns to heaven.

A version provided by Tabari narrates the Tale of Harut and Marut as follows:

The angels were astonished at the acts of disobedience committed by the human beings on earth, claiming they would do better than them. Therefore, God challenged the angels to choose two representatives among them, who would descend to earth and be endowed with bodily desires. During their stay on earth, they fell in love with a woman named Zohra (Venus). She told them she would become intimate with them if they joined her in idolatry and told her how to ascend to heaven. The angels refused and remained pious. Later they met her again and the woman this time stated she would become intimate with them if they drank alcohol. The angels thought that alcohol could not cause great harm and therefore, they accepted the condition. After they were drunk, they became intimate with her and after noticing a witness, they killed them. The next day, Harut and Marut regretted their deeds but could not ascend to heaven anymore due to their sins, as their link to the angels was broken. Thereupon, God asked them, whether their punishment shall be in this world or in the hereafter. They chose to be punished on earth and therefore were sent to Babel as a test, teaching humans magic but not without warning them that they were just a temptation.

==== Protest of the angels ====
Although not explicitly mentioned, Harut and Marut are sometimes linked to the events in Surah 2:30. The Study Quran translates the verse as follows:

"And when thy Lord said to the angels,"I am placing a vicegerent upon the earth," they said, "Wilt Thou place therein one who will work corruption therein, and shed blood, while we hymn Thy praise and call Thee Holy?" He said, "Truly I know what you know not."2:30.

According to this view, God sent down these angels to demonstrate to the protesting angels men's unique and special features. Al-Kisa'i identifies the angels complaining in 2:30 with Harut and Marut, whereupon punished by God.

In his Haba'ik fi akhbar al-mala'ik, Suyuti narrates a ḥadīth that after the dispute mentioned in this verse, the angels made a bet with God. They bet that they are more obedient than the sons of Adam. God then inqures them to choose two among them to descent to earth and being tested.

Zakariya al-Qazwini (1203–1283) narrates on authority of ibn Abbas, when Adam was cast out of the Garden of Eden, he passed by a crowd of angels who reprimanded Adam for breaking the covenant with God. The most critical have been Harut and Marut. Adam sought mercy from the angels and their mockery. Then, God tries the angels until they fail on their part. This version is silent on the details of these angels sins and their teachings of magic.

== Historical context ==
Although the Quran does not call this pair of angels fallen explicitly, the context assumes this to be true. The story bears some resemblance to the Watchers, mentioned in Second Temple traditions and reflects an early Christian belief. The most dominant components of this motif, however, are unique to Islamic tradition and reflect neither biblical or Second Temple traditions: The core feature of this story is the angels' amazement at human wickedness. Unlike in the Book of Watchers and Christian tradition, the story is not about angelic revolt or original sin, but about how tough it is to be a human. In contrast to apocalyptic literature, according to the Quran, they are "sent down" by God.

The names "Hārūt" and "Mārūt", do not originate from Semitic beliefs. Instead, they appear to be etymologically related to Haurvatat and Ameretat, two Amesha Spenta from Zoroastrianism. Georges Dumézil suggested that the story has close parallels to the Mahabharata. The story is popular in folklore and also appears in European-Christian tales in the Three sins of the Hermit.

Mufassirs (authorized exegetes of the Quran) seem to have been aware of the historical reliance on previous Jewish material. Compared to the fallen angels from 3 Enoch, Al-Kalbi (737 AD – 819 AD) identifies Harut and Marut with them. Accordingly, their original names were (‘Azā, ‘Azāyā) and then changed after their fall to Hārūt and Mārūt, just as the name of Satan was changed from ʿAzāzīl to Iblīs after his fall.

For this reason, some Muslim scholars argue that the stories surrounding Harut and Marut derive from Judeo-Christian sources (Israʼiliyyat). According to Ansar al-'Adl, the extra-Quranic story of this verse entered tafsir from Judaism or Christianity. The English Quran translator Abdullah Yusuf Ali states this story develops from Jewish midrashim, particularly Midrash Abkir. Yet, historically, the Midrash Abkir is not dated earlier than the eleventh century, a time then the story of Harut and Marut has been recorded already. Thus, John C. Reeves concludes that, although the Quran alludes to previously known Judeo-Christian material, the midrashim is shaped by Muslim beliefs, not the other way around.

Similarly, Patricia Crone argues that Jews adopted the Islamic story, especially since stories regarding fallen angels were considered unauthentic by Rabbinic Judaism. Rejecting a Jewish origin of the story also comes from Muslim scholars. Kürşad Demirci points out that there are no similarities between the story of Harut and Marut and the angels from ancient Jewish lore.

== Theological dispute ==
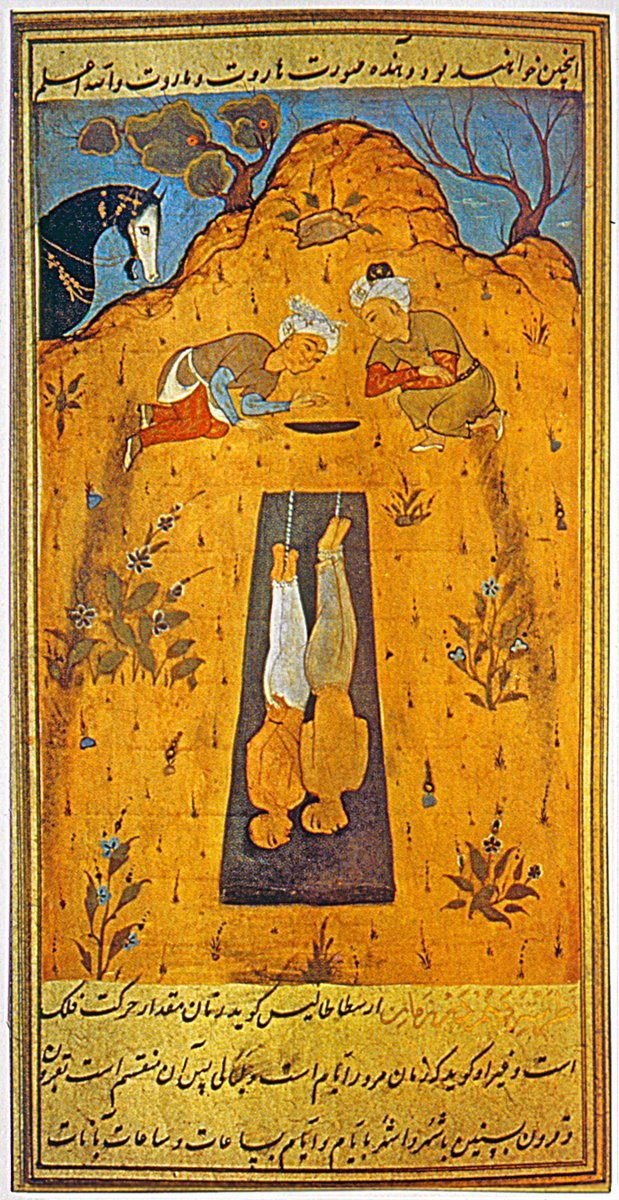
Persian miniature of showing Harut and Marut punished in a well in Babylon

The trial and punishment of Harut and Marut circulated at the time of Muhammad and his companions (salaf), but do not elaborate on them in detail. Al-Suyuti traces the Tale of Harut and Marut to Muhammad himself. However, the inclusion of details, such as Venus, gave rise to dispute in Islamic exegetical tradition. Rabi ibn Anas argues that there is nothing in the Quran about Venus and calls for eliminating her from the Tale of Harut and Marut, or interpreting her as merely an idol or symbol for worshipping stars. Likewise, Ibn Kathir argues that parts of the Tale of Harut and Marut are fabricated (mawḍūʿ) and traces many details to Ka'b al-Ahbar.

Although angels are not infallible in Orthodox Islam, Muslim philosophers (falsafa) commonly reject the Tale of Harut and Marut on grounds of angelic impeccability. According to the philosophers, angels lack a body and the mental capacity to strive for anything else but devotion to God. Abu Ma'shar al-Balkhi (787 – 886) considers angels to be pure ministers of God, a conception borrowed from Jewish lore. Likewise, they reject that the planets (angels) could commit sins, as they hold the view that the planets are integral part of the order of the universe. An exception to Ash'arism and Māturīdism acceptance of angelic fallibility is Fakhr al-Din al-Razi, who agrees with the Mu'tazilites and philosophers that angels cannot sin, and rejects the associated story of the Quranic verse regarding Harut and Marut. He further elevated this position to The Six Articles of Faith. Al-Qurtubi also rejects the story and argues that Harut and Marut are substitutes for the devils.

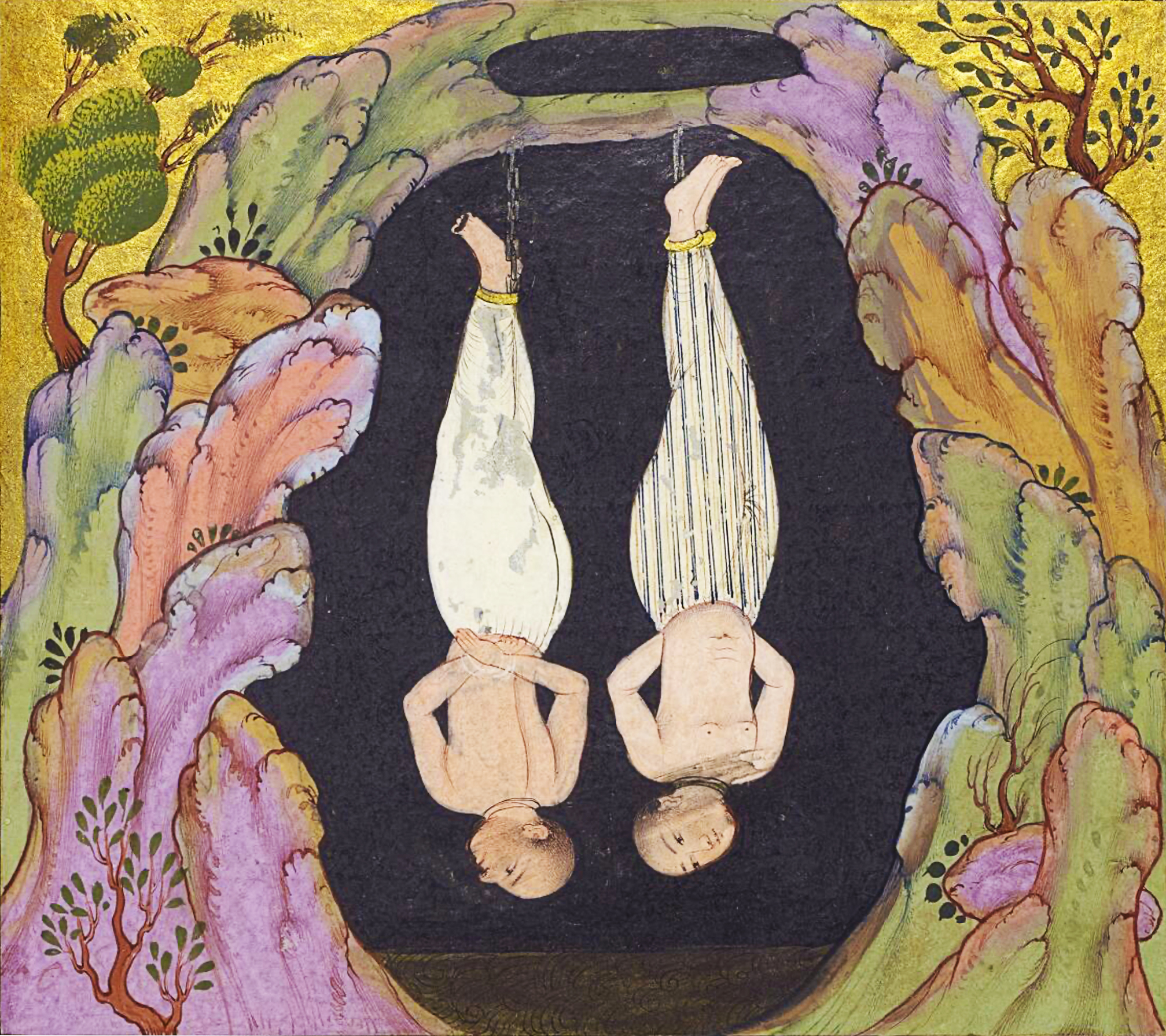
Another Persian miniature of Harut and Marut hanging in a well

Mujahid ibn Jabr explains, in his version of this story, that the lechery of Harut and Marut was in their heart (qalb) not in their flesh, since as angels they lack bodily desires. Similarly, Ibn Kathir, on authority of al-Rabi‘ ibn Anas and Ibn Abbas, Harut and Marut sinned in their heart as they are not like the children of Adam capable of lust for sensual pleasure. This way, Islamic theology reconciles the infallibility of the angels with the sinful actions of Harut and Marut.

While the Tale of Harut and Marut has been widely accepted in pre-modern times, in the modern period Muslim scholars increasingly adhere to the philosopher position. Modernist Salafis Muhammad Abduh and Rashid Rida ignore Venus as part of the story entirely. Furthermore, in the process of the demystification of the Quran, they reject the heavenly origin of Harut and Marut.

== Sufism ==
Ibn Arabi interpretates the verse concerning Harut and Marut metaphorically. The satans are forces veiling the soul from God's light through powers of illusions (awham). By doing so, they are "kafir"; rejecting that only God can ultimately affect things. The fallen angels Harut and Marut, in this context, are the "theoretical" and "practical" intellect, inclined towards the soul. Since the intellect descends to the heart, Harut and Marut are described as "upside down". Their sorcery consists of veiling the heart from the soul, which is symbolized in "separating husband and wife".

Rūmīs major work, the poem Mas̲navī, is closer to the orthodox Islamic depiction of Harut and Marut. The reader is recommended to remember the story of Harut and Marut, and how their self-righteousness led to their demise. By that, Rumi compares believers who criticize other believers for their sins, not realizing that they are doing far worse. Like the angels Harut and Marut, they look down on others, yet are blind to their own pride.

== See also ==
- Azazel
- Samyaza
- Iraq in the Quran
- List of angels in theology
- Lucifer
- Tower of Babel in Islamic tradition
- Watcher (angel)
