= Elbis =

Deity of war and love

Elbis (also Ilvis, Ilbis or Yilbis) is a deity of war and love in Turkic, Yakut, Tuva and Altai mythology. Since "Elbis" shares some devilish characteristics, he became identified with Iblis under Islamic influences. However the name actually derives from the root "Yel" (or El/Al/Yal), which describes evil features. In Yakut mythology, it is also the symbol of jealousy, enmity and ruthlessness.
