= Thabr =

In Islamic demonology, Thabr (ثبر) is one of the five sons of Iblis mentioned in Quranic commentary on Surah 18:51, which speaks about the offspring of Iblis. The devil is further mentioned in a hadith by Muslim ibn al-Hajjaj. He is a devil who causes calamities and injuries. His four brothers are named: Awar (اعور or لأعوار), Zalambur (زلنبور), Sut (مسوط), and Dasim (داسم). Each of them is linked to another psychological function, which they try to encourage to prevent humans spiritual development.
