= Marid =

Rebellious demon in Islamic belief

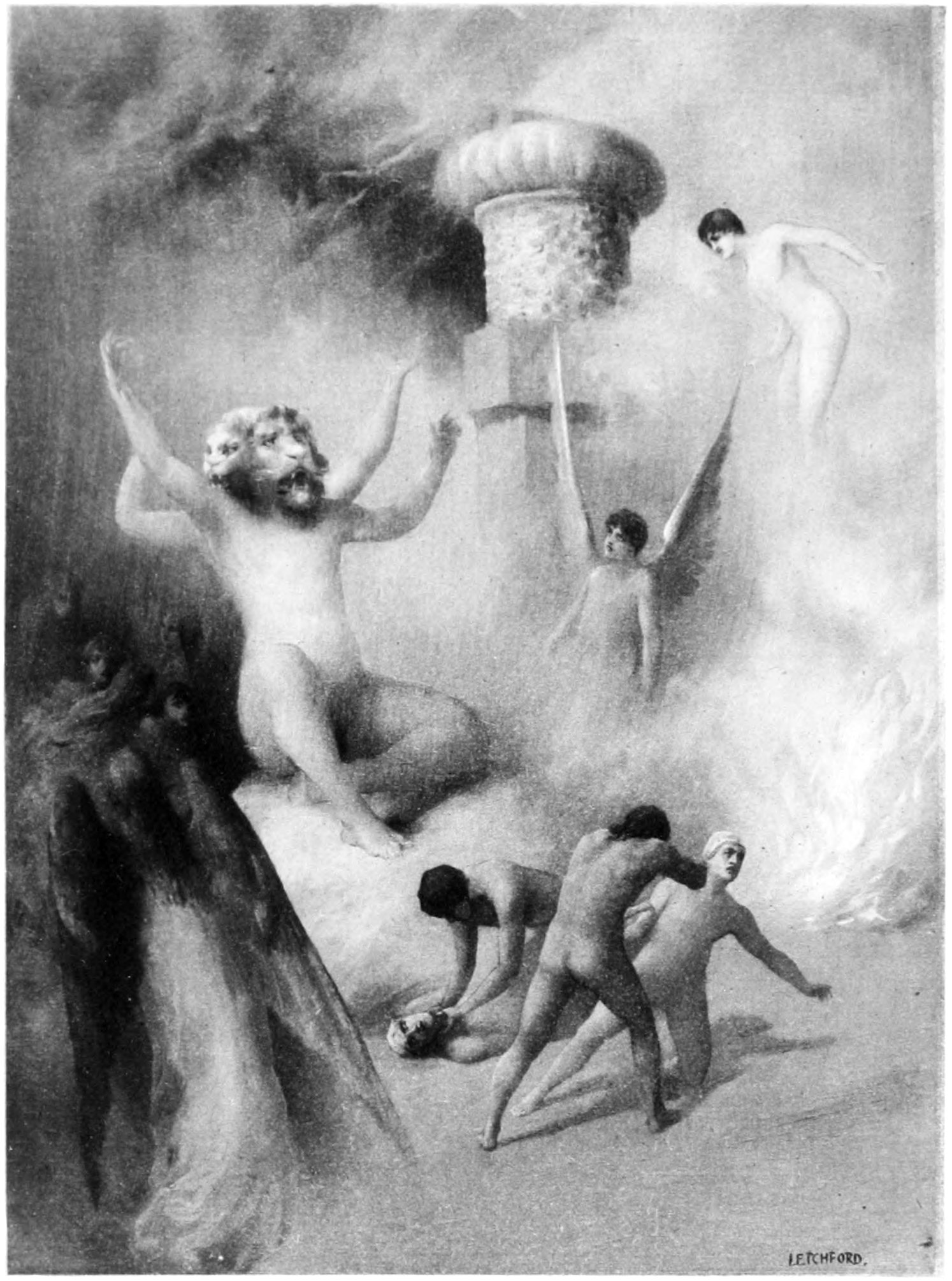
Two Marids depicted in Albert Letchford's illustrations to Burton's translation of Arabian Nights

A marid (Arabic: مَارِد, romanized: mārid) is a type of devil (shayṭān) in Islamic tradition. The Arabic word, meaning "rebellious," is applied to such supernatural beings. As a substantive it refers to a chthonic demon not much dissimilar to the ʿifrīt.

Hans Wehr's A Dictionary of Modern Written Arabic defines marid as a "demon" or "giant." The term "rebellious shayṭān" is directly mentioned once in the Quran in Surat As-Saffat (Q37:7). They are also identified with the Persian devan.

== Etymology ==
The word mārid (Arabic: مارد) is an active participle derived from the Arabic root m-r-d (مرد), whose primary meaning is "recalcitrant" or "rebellious." Lisan al-Arab, the encyclopedic dictionary of Classical Arabic compiled by Ibn Manzur, documents only forms of this general meaning. The term appears as an attribute of evil spirits in the Quranic verse Surah aṣ-Ṣāffāt (37:7), which references a "safeguard against every rebellious devil" (Arabic: شيطان مارد, romanized: shayṭān mārid). Cognates from the same Semitic root include the Hebrew words for "rebellion" (Hebrew: מרד, romanized: mɛrɛḏ) and "rebel" (Hebrew: מוֹרֵד, romanized: moreḏ).

The Dictionary of Modern Written Arabic lists secondary meanings of mārid as "demon" and "giant" (Persian: دیو, romanized: div). Edward Lane's Arabic-English Lexicon cites a classical source describing the term as "applied to an evil jinnī of the most powerful class," though this distinction is not universally accepted. For example, the MacNaghten edition of One Thousand and One Nights uses marid and ifrit interchangeably (e.g., in The Story of the Fisherman).

A debated theory by historian Konstantin Jireček believed that mārid refers to the Greek: Μαρδαϊται, romanized: Mardaitai, referring to marauder mercenaries during the Arab–Byzantine wars, who were eponymously linked to the Albanian tribe of Mirdita.

== Features ==
Amira El-Zein describes the mārid as a supernatural being that attempts to predict the future by ascending to the heavens and eavesdropping on angels. The Quran references the mārid in Surah aṣ-Ṣāffāt (37:7), which states that "the lowest heaven is adorned with stars to ward off rebellious devils" (Arabic: شَيْطَانٍ مَارِدٍ, romanized: shayṭānin māridin), and in Surah an-Nisa (4:117), which condemns the invocation of "none but a rebellious Satan." In Islamic tradition, similar to the ʿifrīt, the mārid is associated with a distinct class of beings from the netherworld.

A narration attributed to Ali, recorded by Ali ibn Ibrahim al-Qummi, states that when God resolved to create Adam, he punished humanity's predecessors by obliterating the nasnas (half-formed beings), erecting a veil between jinn and humans, and confined the "rebellious giants" (Arabic: مَارِدَة, romanized: māridah) to the atmosphere. According to the Maliki Athari scholar Ibn 'Abd al-Barr in his work Al-Tamhîd, the mārid is a demonic entity more malevolent than ordinary shayṭān (devils) but less powerful than an ʿifrīt. Al-Jahiz defines a spirit as an angel if it is entirely good, as a shayṭān if it is wicked, and as a mārid if the spirit succeeds in moving objects and listening at the doors of heaven.

The mārid appears prominently in the Sirat Sayf ibn Dhi-Yazan, a pre-Islamic epic. In the narrative, King Sayf ibn Dhi Yazan orders a mārid to lead him to King Solomon's treasure. True to its rebellious nature, the mārid deliberately disobeys. Sayf later learns from the prophet Khidr that he must command the opposite of his true intent to manipulate the mārid.

A study in Egypt notes that, according to Egyptian tradition, humanity's survival depends on divine restraint of demons; if unchained, mārid would annihilate humankind.

Though mārid and ʿifrīt are both classified as powerful devils, they differ in disposition. While the ʿifrīt is characterized as cunning, treacherous, and deceitful, the mārid is portrayed as less intellectually adept and susceptible to manipulation by humans.

== See also ==
- Asura
- Genies in popular culture
- Ghoul
- Sil'a
- Shayatin
