= Dasim (demon) =

One of the five sons of Iblis

Dasim (داسم) is a demon who is one of the five sons of Iblis, mentioned in tafsir. (attributed to Muslim ibn al-Hajjaj) He is a devil and linked to the cause of hatred between man and wife. His four brothers are named: Awar (اعور or لأعوار), Zalambur (زلنبور), Sut (مسوط), and Tir (ثبر). Each of them is linked to another psychological function, which they try to encourage to prevent humans spiritual development.
