= Dead Sea Apes =

Story in the Quran

The Dead Sea Apes is a Quran story of dwellers by the Dead Sea who were transformed into apes for breaking the Sabbath. It is also a metaphor used, for instance by Thomas Carlyle, describing people in modern times to whom the universe, with all its serious voices, seems to have become a weariness and a humbug.
