= Nāzi'āt and Nāshiṭāt =

Islamic angels associated with death

Nāzi'āt (Arabic: نازعات, pluckers) and Nāshiṭāt (Arabic: ناشطات, drawers) are two classes of death angels subordinate to Azra'il in Islam, responsible for taking the souls of the dead. While Nāzi'āt are commissioned to take the lives of unbelievers forcefully, the Nāshiṭāt take believers gently.

Nāziʿāt angels are responsible for taking out the souls of disbelievers painfully.

Meanwhile, Nāshiṭāt angels are responsible for taking out the souls of believers peacefully. Ibn Kathir interpreted Al-Anfal 8:50 as the angels who takes the soul of unbelievers brought Fires of Hell with them for the additional torture the soul they have taken. Meanwhile, Al-Tabari also interpreted similarly, while also giving addendum interpretations from Muhammad bin Al-Muthanna, Ibn Waki', Mujahid ibn Jabr, and Ibn Abbas among others; that these angels will also smashing the face and back of the unbeliever's soul while doing their task.

== See also ==
- Al-Nazi'at
- List of angels in theology
