= Awar =

Demon in Islam

Awar (Arabic: اعور) is one of the five sons of Iblis, mentioned by Muslim ibn al-Hajjaj. He is a devil who encourages debauchery. His four brothers are named: Dasim (داسم), Zalambur (زلنبور), Sut (مسوط), and Thabr (ثبر). Each of them is linked to another psychological function, which they try to encourage to prevent humans spiritual development.
