= Al-Jānn =

Ancestor of the jinn in Islam-related beliefs

Jann (Arabic: جان, romanized: Jānn, plural Arabic: جِنَّان, romanized: Jinnān or Arabic: جَوَان, romanized: Jawān) are the ancestor of the jinn in Islam. They are said to have inhabited the earth before Adam, ruled by a king called Jann ibn Jann. In folklore however, many consider them to be punished and turned into the weakest class of jinn, comparable to the way in which Dead Sea apes are seen as transformed humans. The father of the jinn is also called Abu Al-Jann.

== Etymology and meaning ==
Jann (from the Semitic root jnn) is an Arabic term, whose primary meaning is "to hide" and can also refer to an agile snake. It is a neuter singular for jinn, while Jinni and Jinniyya(h) are either adjectives, or masculine and feminine singulars or both. The term designate a supernatural creature or a serpent.

Lisan al-'Arab, by Ibn Manzur, gives the following account on the term: "Creatures called jânn lived on earth but they caused mischief in it and shed blood, so God sent his angels who drove them away from the earth; and it is said that these angels became the inhabitants of the earth after the jânn.

Amira el-Zein reports that the term jann is used to specify when the term jinn covers both angels and jinn in meaning.

== Quran and hadiths ==
In the Quran, Surah 15:27 and 55:15, jânn (in contrast to many translations of the Quran using the term jinn instead) is said to be created from fire, and taken to be the ancestor of all jinn. Mufassir (authorized exegetes of the Quran) disagree if this refers to Iblis or to a separate creature who is father of all jinn, in contrast to Iblis as the father of shayatin (devils). The tradition of Hasan al Basri considers Iblis and al-jann to be identical. However, the majority distinguishes between Iblis, the father of devils and Jann the father of jinn.

In Surah 27:10, it is related to the staff of Moses while turning into a serpent.

Sahih Muslim describes al-Jann as being created out of a mixture of fire, contrasted with the angels created from light and humans created from clay-mud. Another hadith, mentioned in the collection of Al-Tirmidhi, reports that Muhammad sought refuge in God from al-Jann, the father of jinn, until Surah Al-Nas and Surah Al-Falaq had been revealed.

== Pre-Adamite Era ==
Quranic exegesis links the angels' complaining about the creation of Adam (Surah 2:30) to witnessing the corruption of the offspring of al-jann, the previous ruler of the world. Abu al-Layth al-Samarqandi explains that, after God created the world, he created al-jann from smokeless fire (Arabic: مَارِجٍ مِن نَّار, mārijin min nār. His descendants multiplied and shed blood. Thereupon God sent the angels from heaven under the command of Azazil to defeat the jinn and drive them to the far islands.

In Persian Islamic legends, the world was ruled by Jann ibn Jann (Son of Jann), two thousand years before Adam was created. They were similar to humans in many ways and in many legends, God sent prophets to them, just as prophets were sent to humans. Jann ibn Jann offended the heavens, whereupon God sent Al-Harith (Iblis) with an army of angels to chastise him. But Jann ibn Jann refused to submit to the angels and a war ensued. At the end, Jann ibn Jann was overthrown by Al-Harith and the angels, who reigned the world onwards instead.

In another account, attributed to Abu Bakr al-Shibli, the pre-Adamite jinn are all referred to as jânn. They would have battled angelic jinn under the command of Iblis, but were driven away from the surface of the earth.

Many Arabic legends regard the Pyramids of Giza as remains of the works done under the rule of Jann ibn Jann.

== Kalām ==
The Medieval Asharite mystic Ibn Arabi, famous for his teachings of Unity of Existence, describes Jann, the father of jinn, as the origin of human's animalistic desires. Accordingly, God created Jann as the interior of human being, the animal soul hidden from the senses. Among the strongest powers of the animal power is the power of illusion, which is materialized in Satan, interpreted as one of the descendants of Jann in Ibn Arabis' metaphysics:

The insan (human being) was conceived by God as an exterior, as a body which perceives and sees. He created it from earth, from the densest of elements. In it, there is dryness which resembles clay and solidity which resembles the bones being the support of the body. And He created the jan as the interior of the human being, as its animal soul which is hidden from senses. This jan is the father of the jinn. He is the origin of animal powers. The strongest of these powers and the most noble among them is illusion. Illusion is materialized in Satan who is called also Iblis. He is among the descendants of jan, created out of marij, out of a subtle and pure flame of fire.

== See also ==
- Div (mythology)
- Tannin (mythology)
