= Sut =

Demon in Islamic tradition

In Islamic tradition, Sut (مسوط) is one of the offspring of Iblis mentioned by Muslim ibn al-Hajjaj. He is a devil who suggests lies. His four brothers are named: Awar (اعور or لأعوار), Zalambur (زلنبور), Dasim (داسم), and Tir (ثبر). Each of them is linked to another psychological function, which they try to encourage to prevent humans spiritual development.
