= Zalambur =

Son of Iblis

Zalambur (alternate spelling Zalanboor) (Arabic: زلنبور) is one of the five sons of Iblis mentioned by Muslim ibn al-Hajjaj. He is a devil who presides over dishonest and fraudulent business transactions. Said to have four brothers: Awar (اعور or لأعوار), Dasim (داسم), Sut (مسوط), and Tir (ثبر). Each of them is linked to a different psychological function which they try to encourage in order to prevent humans spiritual development. He is also frequently mentioned in tafsir in order to detail information regarding the offspring of Iblis mentioned in Surah 18:51.
