= Azazil =

Name of Iblis before he was expelled from heaven

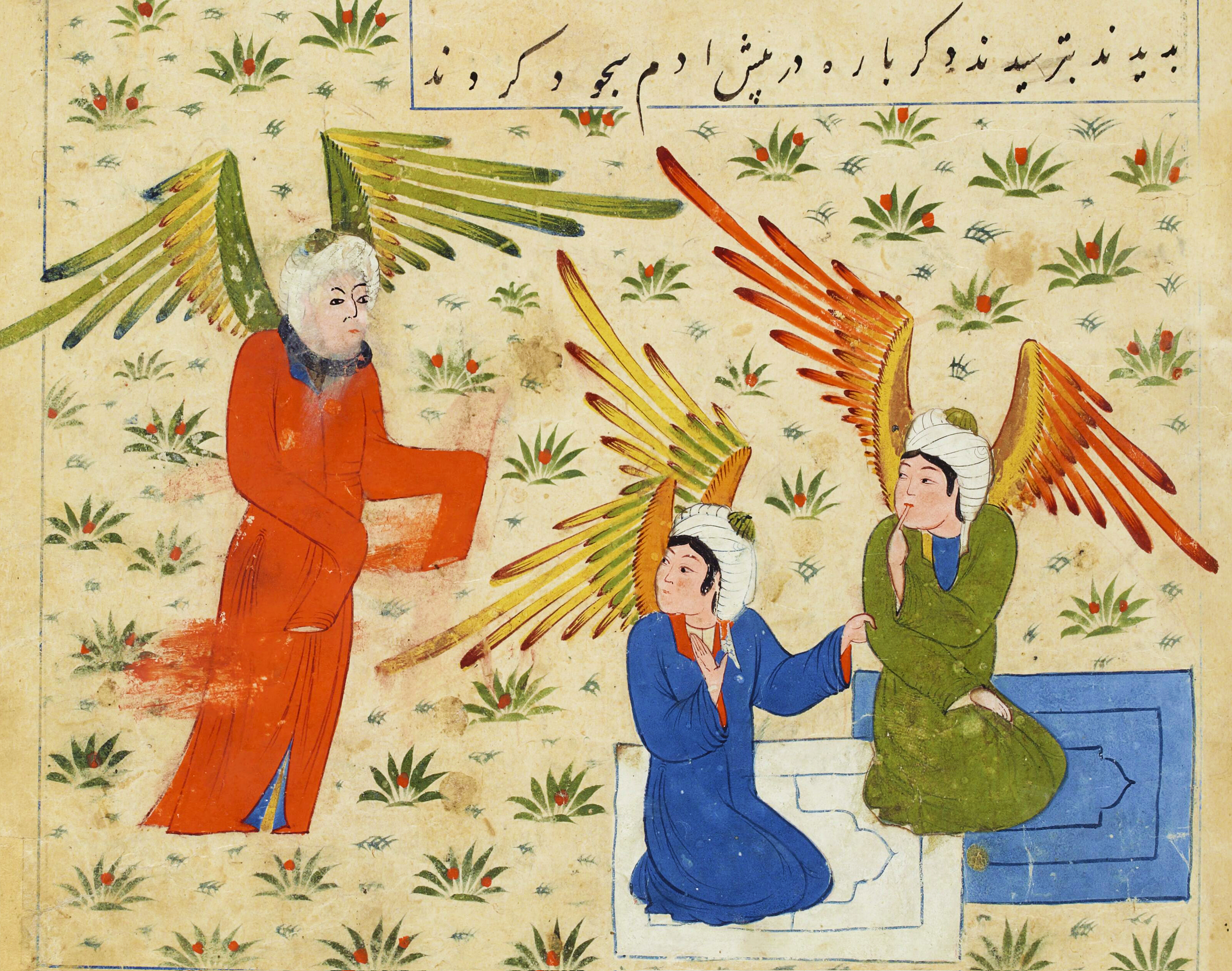
Two angels turn back and see with alarm that Iblīs will not bow down before ʾĀdam. 1388 Persian miniature from a manuscript of ʿAjāʾib al-Makhlūqāt ("Wonders of Creation") by al-Ṭūsī Salmānī, century.

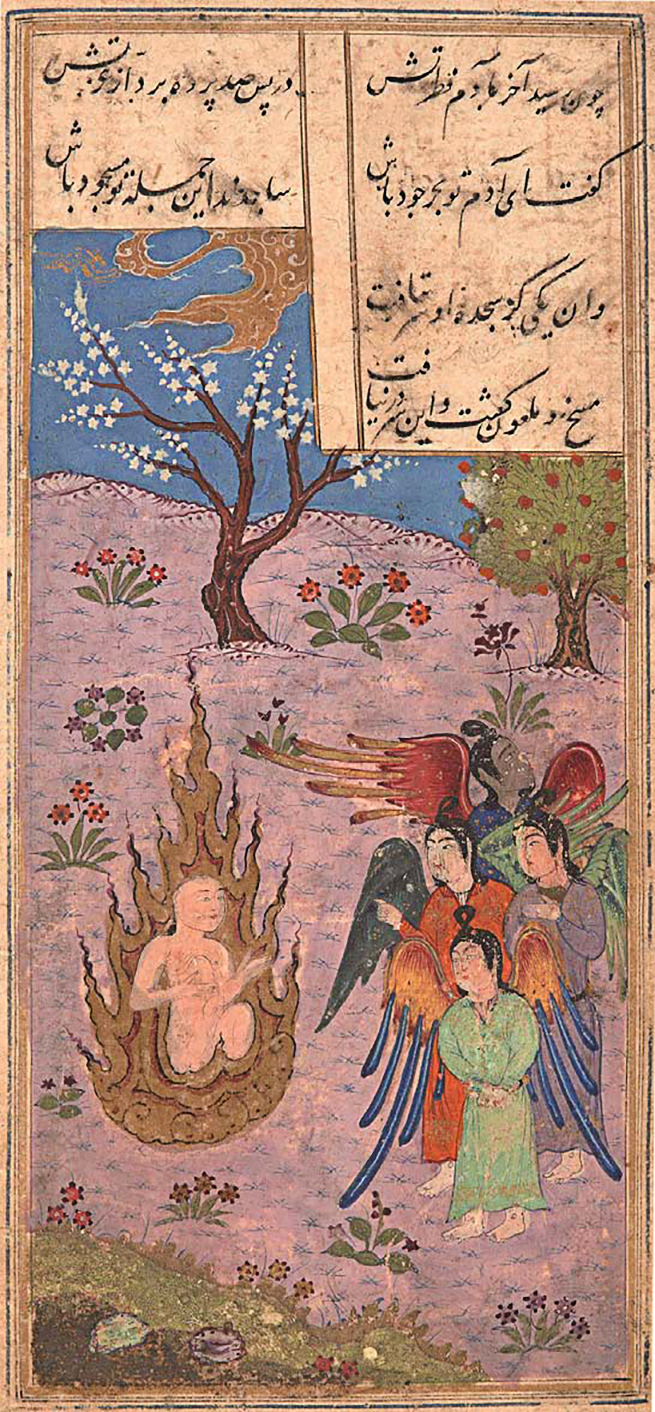
The angels meet Adam, and seem to share, albeit to a lesser degree, the defiant reaction of Iblīs, who stands at the back haughtily turning his head away. According to tradition, God created Iblīs as a beautiful Genie (jinn) called ʿAzāzīl and he is depicted as such here. He is portrayed with his characteristic darker skin to denote his impending fall, but he has wings of an angel and wears the contemporary ‘angelic hairstyle,’ a loop of hair tied on top of the head.

Azazil (Arabic: عزازيل ʿAzāzīl, Turkish: Azâzîl; also known in Arabic: حارث Ḥārith) is a figure in Islamic tradition, and believed to be the original name of Iblis.

ʿAzāzīl is mentioned in Islamic complementary narratives, such as tafsīr (exegesis of the Quran) and Qisas al-Anbiya. According to a ḥadīth by ibn Abbas, Satan was once an angel called ʿAzāzīl or al-Ḥārith. He states that God created most angels from "light" (Nūr), but ʿAzāzīl and the angels with him from "poisonous fire" (nār as-samūm). The djinn were created from "a mixture of fire" (mārijin min nār).

The djinn were the first to inhabit the world and Allah entrusted them to govern the earth. When corruption increased among them, Allah sent an army of angels under the leadership of ʿAzāzīl to punish them. After driving the djinn away, ʿAzāzīl grew arrogant. When Allah creates a successor to the djinn and commands the angels to prostrate themselves before the new creation, ʿAzāzīl refuses, claiming that he is better. Thereupon, he is condemned to hell.

== Etymology and naming ==
The name resembles Azazel, a fallen angel in the Apocalypse of Abraham, and might be its etymological origin. The name itself likely derives from Jewish sources, but Islamic sources appear to be the first to consider this to be the original name of Satan.

Some scholars suggested that Muslims constructed the name independently from Jewish sources. Feinberg argues that the name relates to Arabic ‘azala (to remove) and is given to this angel because he "removes or separates" by Muslim authors. Some Islamic philologists construct his name from the words aziz and il (God's dear), meaning that his name derived from the meaning that he was once God's favorite angel.

According to many Arabic scholars, ʿAzāzīl was the personal name of Satan (Iblis). Ibn Manzur (June–July 1233 – December 1311/January 1312) writes in his dictionary of the Arabic language:

"The word "إبليس" [(Iblis)] is from the root "بلس" [(bls)]. The root may mean: to be silent. "أبلس من رحمة الله" means to be in despair of Allah's mercy, hence, the name إبليس (Iblis). His original name was Azazil. Allah has said in Surah Al-Rum "وَيَوْمَ تَقُومُ ٱلسَّاعَةُ يُبْلِسُ ٱلْمُجْرِمُونَ" (On the Day that the Hour will be established, the guilty will be struck dumb with despair). The name "Iblis" is derived from the root, بلس, as he is in despair of Allah's mercy" -Ibn Mandhur, Lisan Al-Arab, Vol.6/29

== Sunni interpretation ==
Sunni exegetical tradition can be divided into two camps in regards on the identity of Satan. This dispute roots back to the formative stage of Islam. When Surah al-Kahf states, in reference to Satan, "(...) he was one of the jinni (...)", the strand of Hasan al-Basri and ibn Abbas differ in meaning. According to al-Basri, angels are infallible. Thus, he argues, Satan could not have been an angel. Instead, the verse is supposed to mean that Satan is one of the djinn, distinct from the angels.

According to ibn Abbas, the term is interpreted as jinān, meaning that Satan was "an inhabitant of paradise" (i.e. an angel). At that time, he was appointed by God as the ruler of the lower heavens and sent to judge the djinn, until they became corrupt and was commanded to eliminate them. Ibn Abbas further explains that Satan's angelic name was ʿAzāzīl. However, after ʿAzāzīl was banished from heaven, his name is changed to Iblīs and is turned into a "cursed demon" (shayṭān rajim).

He is further blamed to claim divine authority for himself by calling for obedience among God's creation. Surah al-’Anbiyā (26-29) is understood as a reference to Satan:

"And they say, "The Most Merciful has taken a son." Exalted is He! Rather, they are [but] honored servants. They cannot precede Him in word, and they act by His command. He knows what is [presently] before them and what will be after them, and they cannot intercede except on behalf of one whom He approves. And they, from fear of Him, are apprehensive. And whoever of them should say, "Indeed, I am a god besides Him" - that one We would recompense with Hell. Thus do We recompense the wrongdoers."

Unlike the tradition of al-Basri, ibn Abbas' interpretation accepts that angels can sin and be expelled from heaven. This interpretation is favored in Sunni tradition by scholars such as Tabari, Suyuti, and Nasafi.

=== Sufism ===
Al-Hallaj (c. 858 – 922) mentions ʿAzāzīl in his Kitāb al-Tawāsīn. Here, ʿAzāzīl's disobedience to refuse God's command is described as way to hallow God's name. According to him, ʿAzāzīl proved loyalty to God by declining to bow before Adam. Chapter Six is dedicated to the self-defence of ʿAzāzīl, and in one section Hallaj explains how each of the letters of ʿAzāzīl's name relate to his personality. Unlike many other Sufi writers, Hallaj rejected that ʿAzāzīl could be restored to God's grace, insisting on Satan's damnation. He argues that, since ʿAzāzīl originated from fire, fire must be his final destiny.

ʿAzāzīl is also mentioned three times in Rumi's Masnavi, as a reminder for the Muslim to exercise discipline and humility, since when ʿAzāzīl acted arrogantly, he was abandoned to hell in spite of his former high position:

Through discipline and humility this heaven has been filled with light, and through discipline the angel became immaculate and holy. By reason of irreverence, the sun was eclipsed, and insolence caused Azazil to be turned back from the door.

Al-Jili describes angels (malāʾikah) and devils (shayāṭīn) as manifestations of God's attributes. While the good angels are made from light in order to guide humanity, ʿAzāzīl and his angels are created as reflecting God's names of majesty, darkness and misleading. As an angel of single-minded devotion, ʿAzāzīl fails to realize that bowing before Adam in accordance with God's command is equal as bowing to God himself. ʿAzāzīl and his angels were reduced to the principle of evil, when they rejected repentance and justified their persistence by their creation from fire.

Inayat Khan (1882 – 1927), a pioneer of the transmission of Sufism to the West, similarly teaches that ʿAzāzīl is a devil leading astray from the way of God. He states that evil actions performed by people attract the spirit of ʿAzāzīl (or his minions) who in turn leads them further astray into darkness and wrong actions. ʿAzāzīl is the worst of the tempters, since the fallen angel has the power to lead even saints astray, however, still fails against the prophets.

== Shia interpretations ==
=== Twelver Shia ===
Similar to the Sunni tradition, Shia exegesis on the events mentioned in Surah 2:30-34 revolves around Adam's role as a "successor" (ḫalīfa). Both conjecture that Adam is a successor to the djinn, whose rulings over the earth was put to an end by the angels on God's behalf. The angels drew a parallel between Adam and the impious djinn when questioning God's decision to create humanity. Ali ibn Ibrahim al-Qummi attributes this account through a lineage of previous Imams until it reaches Ali.

In the treatise Itbad al wasiyya, not an exegetical work but legitimation of the Twelve Imams, God created the djinn and nasnas on earth. When the djinn and nasnas caused corruption and bloodshed, God sends down an army of angels. The leader of the angels was ʿAzāzīl. ʿAzāzīl and his angels deported the djinn and nasnas to the edge of the world. whereas ʿAzāzīl and his companions settled on the central part of the earth. ʿAzāzīl became the ruler of the earth and pretended to be of angelic quality outwardly but disobeyed God inwardly. ʿAzāzīl ruled for 7000 years until God ordered the angels of heaven to look at earth again. The angels were appalled by the destruction occurring on earth. After that, God announces to create a successor to the angels.

=== Ismailism ===
In Umm al-Kitab, an 8th-century Ismaili work, ʿAzāzīl is the first creation of God, the High King. God gave him the power of creation, but ʿAzāzīl boasted with his loaned power, claiming divinity for himself, describing himself as another God beside the High King. To prove that ʿAzāzīl's creation only depends on the power of his own creator, God makes a new creation, opposed by ʿAzāzīl. Every time, ʿAzāzīl again claims to be like God, he and his fellow angels lose colour, becoming darker and inferior and are thrown into lower celestial spheres until they end up on earth, which is made out of the essence of ʿAzāzīl's creations.

Iblīs enters the scene only later, as a result of the sins of the former heavenly creatures. For that reason, Iblīs does not know the world of light and is utterly evil. For this reason, evil is always associated with ignorance.

In the tenth-century work Kitāb al-Šaǧara satans (abālisa) and devils (shayāṭīn) are described as forces who obstruct people from learning esoteric knowledge (ʿilm al-bāṭin) of the Quran. Each prophet has to face a unique incarnation of the devilish principle. ʿAzāzīl is the first satan (iblīs) and his disciple (šayṭān) is the Quranic Cain.

== Bektashi Alevism ==
Bektashi Alevism, despite its heterodox, believes in angels similar to Sunnis. As in the Quranic tradition, angels are ordered to prostrate themselves, but Azazil refuses. In the Alevi interpretation, however, the prostration was to Ali.

In a creation story, the archangels are ordered to bow before a mystical light. After Azazil served God for 1001 days, he refused to bow down, claiming independency of his creator out of pride. Whereupon, he is, unlike the other archangels, not allowed to enter the light and remains in the world of the "Evil Self". This event later manifests in the enmity between the Devil and humanity.

== See also ==
- Angels in Islam
- List of angels in theology
- Lucifer
