= Iblis =

Primary Devil in Islamic tradition

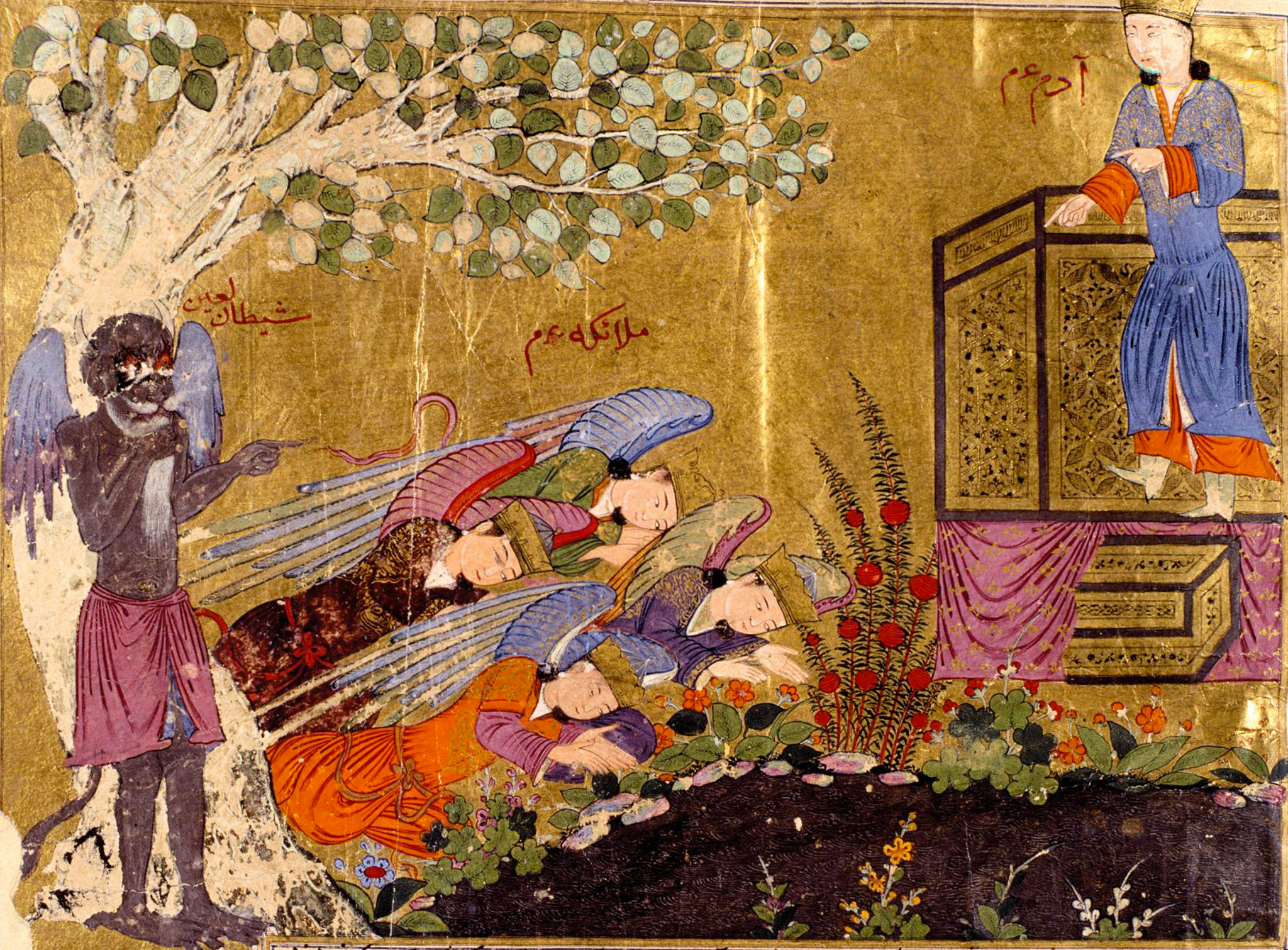
Angels honor Adam, except Iblis, who refuses. Painting from a illustrated subsection containing Bal'ami's Persian rendition of the Annals in a much larger Herat manuscript.

Iblis (Note: Alternatively spelled as Eblīs) (Arabic: إِبْلِيسْ, romanized: Iblīs), also known as Shaitan, is the leader of the devils (shayāṭīn) in Islam. According to the Quran, Iblis was thrown out of heaven after refusing to prostrate himself before Adam. In Sufi cosmology, Iblis embodies the cosmic veil supposedly separating the immanent aspect of God's love from the transcendent aspect of God's wrath. He is often compared to the Christian concept of Satan, since both figures were cast out of heaven according to their respective religious narratives. In his role as the master of cosmic illusion in Sufism, he functions in ways similar to the Buddhist concept of Mara.

Islamic theology (kalām) regards Iblis as an example of attributes and actions which God punishes with hell (Nār). Regarding the origin and nature of Iblis, there are two different viewpoints. According to one, Iblis is an angel, and according to the other, he is the father of all the jinn. Quranic exegesis (tafsīr) and the Stories of the Prophets (Qiṣaṣ al-anbiyāʾ) elaborate on Iblis's origin story in greater detail. In Islamic tradition, Iblis is identified with ash-Shayṭān ("the Devil"), often followed by the epithet ar-Rajīm (Arabic: ٱلرَّجِيم, lit. 'the Accursed'). Shayṭān is usually applied to Iblis in order to denote his role as the tempter, while Iblīs is his proper name.

Some Muslim scholars uphold a more ambivalent role for Iblis while preserving the term shayṭān exclusively for evil forces, considering Iblis to be not simply a devil but also "the truest monotheist" (Tawḥīd-i Iblīs), because he would only bow before the Creator and not his creations. Others have strongly rejected sympathies with Iblis, considering them to be deceptively instigated by Iblis. Rumi's poetic work Masnavi-e-Ma'navi explores this form of deception in detail: when Iblis wakes up Mu'awiya to the morning prayer, he appears to have benevolent intentions at first, but it turns out, Iblis is just hiding his true malevolent motivations. The ambivalent role of Iblis is also addressed in Islamic literature. Hafez, who considers Iblis to be an angel, writes that angels are incapable of emotional expression and thus that Iblis attempts to mimic piety but is incapable of worshipping God with passion. According to Muhammad Iqbal, Iblis tests humans in order to teach them to overcome their selfish tendencies.

Iblis is one of the most well-known individual supernatural entities in Islamic tradition, and has appeared extensively across Islamic and non-Islamic art, literature, and contemporary media.

== Naming, etymology, and origin ==
In Islamic traditions, Iblīs is known by many alternative names or titles, such as Abū Murrah (Arabic: أَبُو مُرَّة, 'Father of Bitterness'), stemming from the word murr – meaning 'bitter'; ‘aduww Allāh or ‘aduwallah (عُدُوّ الله, "enemy or foe" of God); and Abū al-Ḥarith (أَبُو الْحَارِث, 'the father of the plowmen').

The designation Iblīs (إِبْلِيس) may be an epithet referencing an attribute, deriving from the Arabic verbal root bls (ب-ل-س, with the broad meaning of "remain in grief"). According to Ibn Manzur, this is the majority opinion among Arab scholars, who maintain the tradition that the personal name of this being was ʿAzāzīl.

Some Muslim teachers, such as al-Jili, relate this name to talbis meaning confusion, because God's command confused him.

Another possibility is that the name was derived from Ancient Greek diábolos (διάβολος; also the source of the English word devil) via a Syriac intermediary. The name is not found in Arabic literature before the Quran, suggesting it is not of pre-Islamic Arabian origin.

The Quranic story of Iblis parallels extrabiblical sources, such as Life of Adam and Eve, about Satan's fall from heaven, preponderant in Eastern Christian circles.

== Theology (Kalam) ==
=== Quran ===
Iblis is mentioned by name in the Quran eleven times, nine of which relate to his refusal of God's Command to prostrate himself before Adam. The term šayṭān is more prevalent; although Iblis is sometimes referred to as šayṭān, the terms are not interchangeable: Iblis is the proper name of the Quranic figure, while šayṭān refers to an unequivocal evil force. The fragments of Iblis's story are scattered across the Quran. In the aggregate, the story can be summarised as follows:

When God created Adam, He ordered the angels to bow before the new creation. All of the angels obeyed, but Iblis refused. He argued that, having been created from fire, he was superior to humans, who were made from clay-mud, and therefore should not be expected to prostrate himself before Adam. As punishment for his haughtiness, God banished Iblis from heaven and condemned him to hell. Later, Iblis requested permission to attempt to mislead Adam and his descendants, and God granted the request—thus portraying God as the power behind both angels and devils.

Surah al-Kahf states in reference to Iblis:

[...] except Iblis, he was one of the jinni [...]

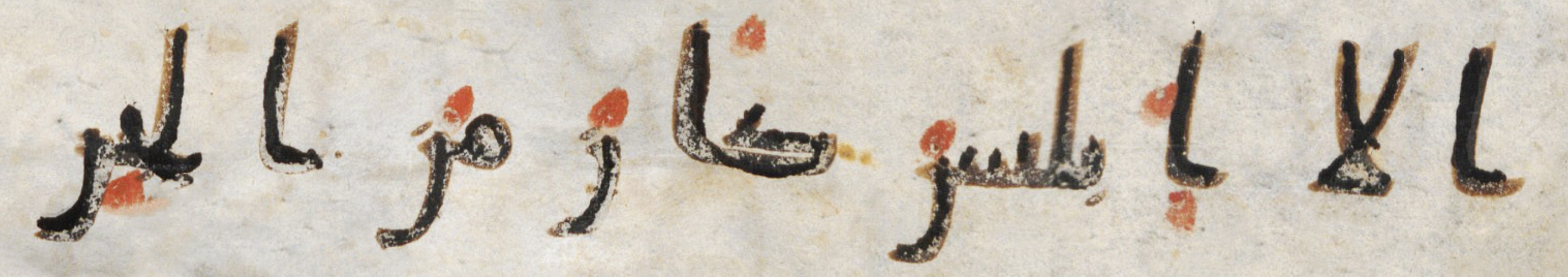
Quran 18:50, word 8–13 from a 660–710 manuscript

This passage led to a dispute among the mufassirūn (exegetes), who disagree on whether the term is intended as a nisba, designating Iblis's heavenly origin (i.e. an angel) in contrast to the earthly Adam (and the jinn who preceded him), or if it serves to distinguish Iblis from the angels, portraying him as the progenitor of the jinn who dwelled in paradise until his fall — analogous to Adam's sin in Garden Eden followed by his fall. This dispute goes back to the formative stage of Islam. These two conflicting opinions are based on the interpretations of ibn Abbas and Hasan al-Basri respectively. This debate resulted in two positions, at each gained substantial support by Muslim scholars.

Iblis is arguably implicitly mentioned in Surah 21:29 (al-’anbiyā), claiming divinity for himself by inviting humans and jinn to follow egoistic desires (nafs). This interpretation is shared, among others, by Tabari, Suyuti, al-Nasafi, and al-Māturīdī: (Note: From Yüksek Lisans Tezi: Translation: (in English) " When one of them said, He is not God, I am! If he says that, we will punish him with hell. This is how we punish the oppressors.” (Anbiya-21/26-29) If the angels who were considered as gods had not had the possibility of making such a false claim, God would not have prohibited that. According to those who say that angels can commit sins, those who are good by nature are not praised. Since angels are praised in the verses, it is not necessary for them to do good. Mâturîdî says that angels are tested and that it is possible for them to sin and reminds that Iblis is also one of the angels." Original: (in Turkish) "“…Onlardan biri, Tanrı O değil, benim! diyecek olsa, biz onu da cehennemle cezalandırırız. Zalimleri böyle cezalandırırız.” (Enbiya-21/26-29) beyanında tanrı edinilen meleklerin kendilerinin de böyle yanlış bir iddiayı ortaya koyma ihtimalleri olmasa Allah onlara yasak getirmezdi. Meleklerin günah işleme gücünün olduğuna inananlara göre fıtratları gereği iyi olanlar övülmez. Ayetlerde melekler övüldüğüne göre hayrı işlemeleri bir zorunluluk değildir."))

"And whosoever among them would say, "Truly I am a god apart from Him," such will We requite with Hell. Thus do We requite the wrongdoers."

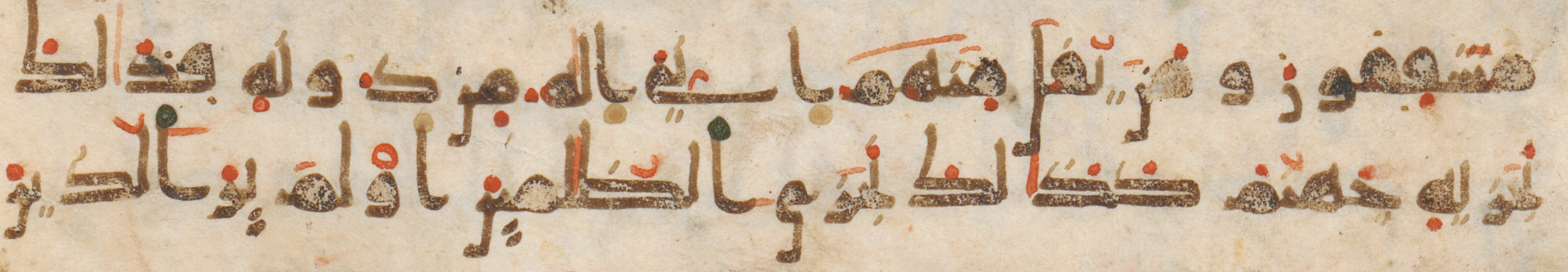
Quran 21:29 from a 750–1000 manuscript

Sijjin, mentioned in Surah 83:7, is described as a prison in hell by Quranic exegetes (e.g. Tabari, Tha'labi, Nasafi). Iblis is chained at the bottom and sends his demons to the surface.

=== Affiliation and predestination ===
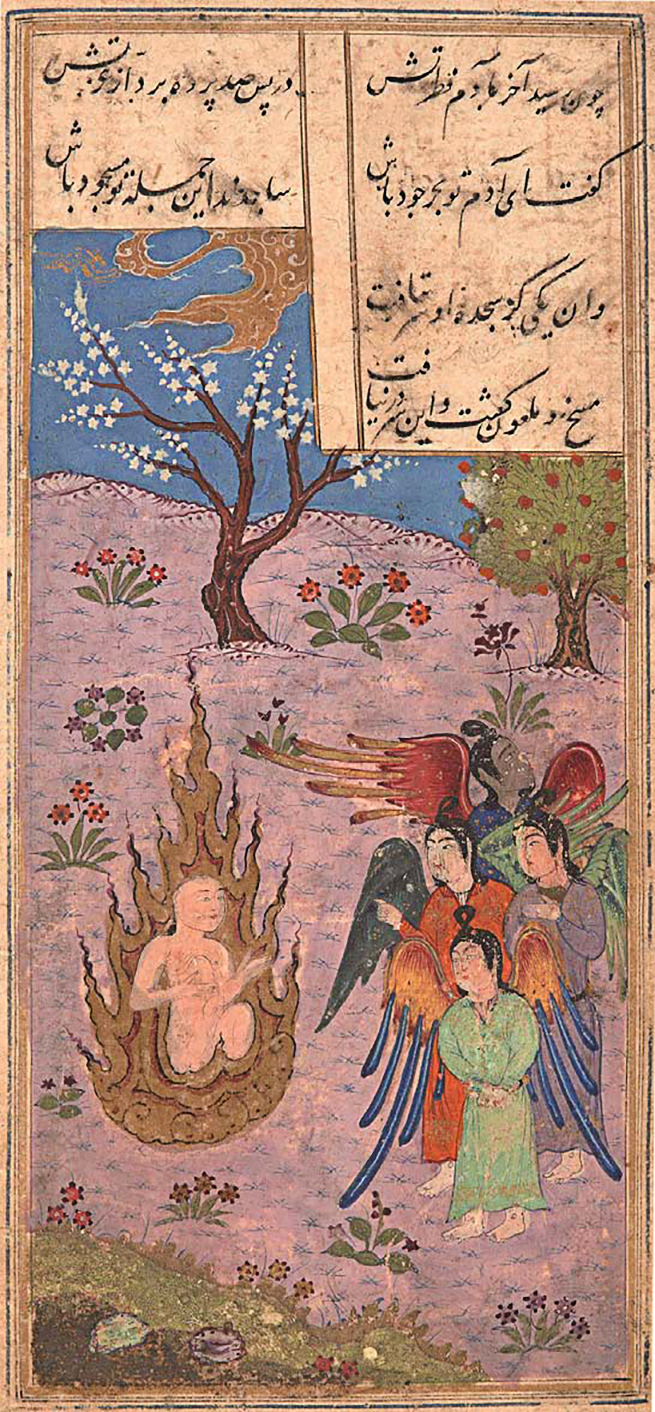
The Angels meet Adam, the prototypical human being. They share, albeit to a lesser degree, the defiant reaction of Iblis, who haughtily turns his head away. Painting from a manuscript of the Manṭiq al-ṭayr (The Conference of the Birds) of Farīd al-Dīn ʿAṭṭār. Iran, Shiraz, 899/1494.

There are different opinions regarding the origin of Iblis. This dispute is closely related to doctrinal differences regarding free will. Islam believes that like humans, jinn are created on earth to "worship" ('abada) God (51:56), and are capable of righteous and evil acts (11:119).

It is disputed in Islam whether angels (malāʾikah) are capable of sin. Those who hold that angels cannot sin thus assert that Iblis is merely a jinn, with only jinn and humans being capable of disobeying God. This is the general opinion among the Qadariyah and most Mu'tazilites. This view is also found among many Salafis. The Islamist writer Sayyid Qutb denies that angels can sin and so rejects readings which depict Iblis as an angelic being. Sunni Muslims, with al-Razi as one exception, generally adhere to the doctrine of predestination—i.e. that everything that happens in the universe happens by divine decree—and assert that Iblis acts in obedience to his inner nature and God's plan, but in disobedience to God's command.

The context of Iblis's disobedience assumes that Iblis is an angel, as in early Islam the term malāk (angel) is used for celestial beings. Tabarsi says that if Iblis were a jinni, he could not have been one of the custodians of Paradise. Many of those who say that Iblis was an angel read Surah 18:50 as a nisba for the term jannāt, thus referring to Iblis's heavenly origin (this reading is preferred by – among others – Ash'ari, Suyuti, and al-Tha'labi). The Hanbalites and Ash'arites argue that Iblis was ignorant (jahl) and did not understand God's will (irāda), but Iblis's unbelief (kufr) was ultimately caused by God. Al-Maghrībī states that, when the angels questioned the creation of Adam, God opened the angels' eyes to the characteristics of Adam, but closed the eyes of Iblis, so he would remain in resistance (iḥtijāj). Therefore, Iblis would have been created as a disobedient angel and function as God's tempter. Abu Mansur al-Maturidi, the eponymous founder of Māturīdī theology, argues that humans and jinn are tested on earth, while angels are tested in heaven. He argues that if angels were not tested, the Quran would not compliment angels for obedience.

The Mu'tazilites, considering it impossible for God to have any negative attributes, reject the notion that Iblis's function as a tempter was initiated by God. Al-Zamakhshari criticizes the Sunni view as ascribing negative attributes to God. According to the Mu'tazilites, when Iblis blames God for leading him astray in Surah 15:39, these words belong to Iblis alone and cannot serve as a confirmation of God being the cause of Iblis's fall.

=== Function ===
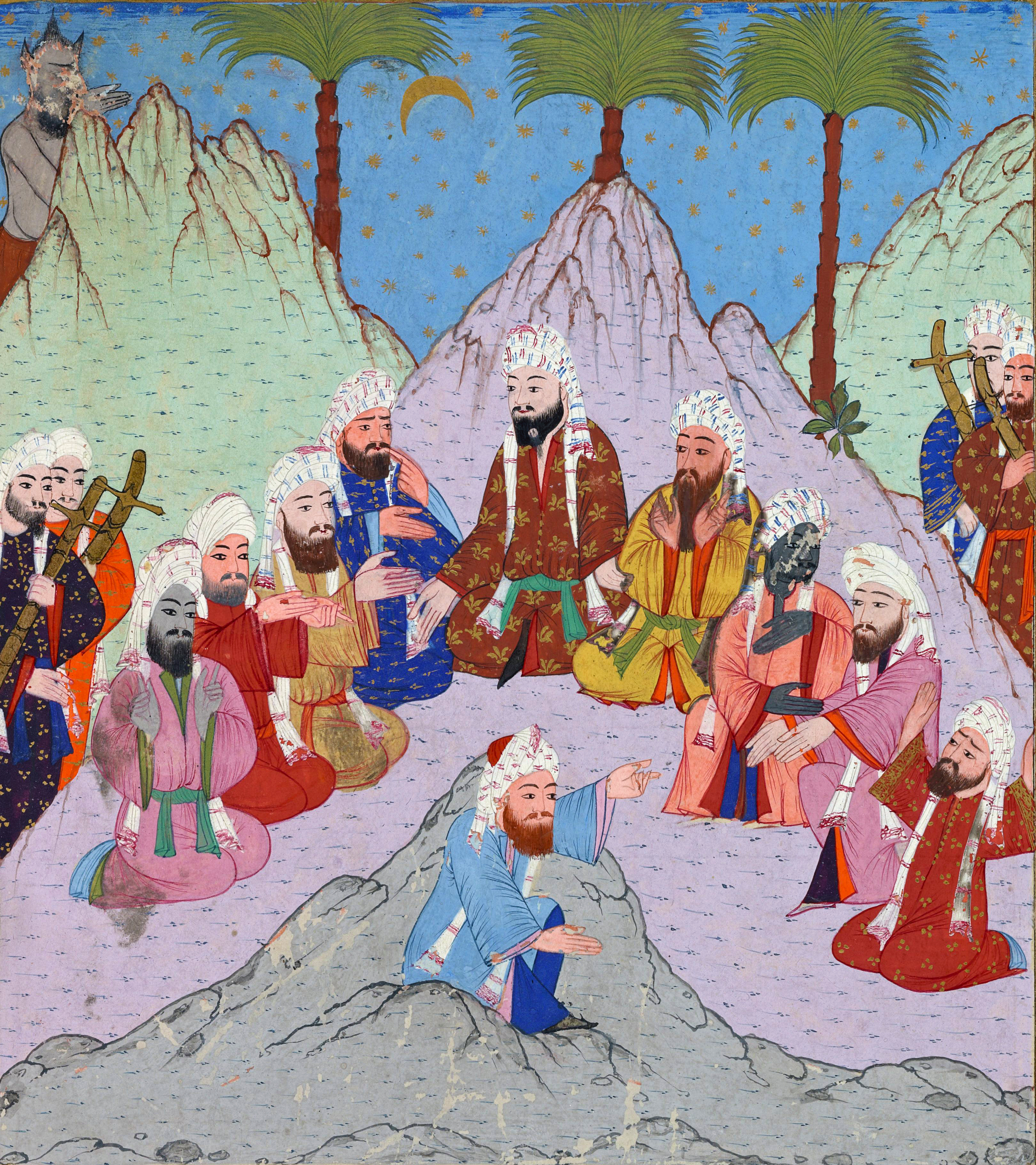
Islamic miniature of Iblis (top-left) tempting Quraysh leaders discussing the second pledge at al-Aqabah and the anti-Islamic zealot spying on them, to try and stop the spread of Islam.

In Muslim thought, Iblis is generally not considered to be the originator of evil. However, there are a few exceptions among Muslim scholars. The Qadariyah asserted that evil was introduced by disobedience to God, and Iblis was the first who disobeyed. This view is sometimes attributed to Hasan al-Basri. An extreme position among the Qadariyah asserted that Iblis was not even created by God, but this was generally rejected as a limitation on God's power, showing influence from the cosmic dualism of Zoroastrianism, as expressed by "magicians" (majūs). Al-Māturīdī argued that such dualistic worldviews are irreconcilable with the Islamic doctrine of tawhid. Some extreme positions went as far as to consider belief that actions are uncaused by God to be a form of shirk (association), as it implies a second power independent from God.

Iblis's disobedience is understood as an example and warning for humans and jinn – i.e. the thaqalān, the two types of creatures held to account for their deeds. The position that Iblis was predestined to fall views his creation as a means for God to demonstrate his entire spectrum of attributes – including his wiliness (makr) – as well as to teach the consequences of sin. As such, the example of Iblis demonstrates the necessity of avoiding transgression (ma'siyah), arrogance (istikbār), and comparison (qiyās) between oneself and another creature of God.

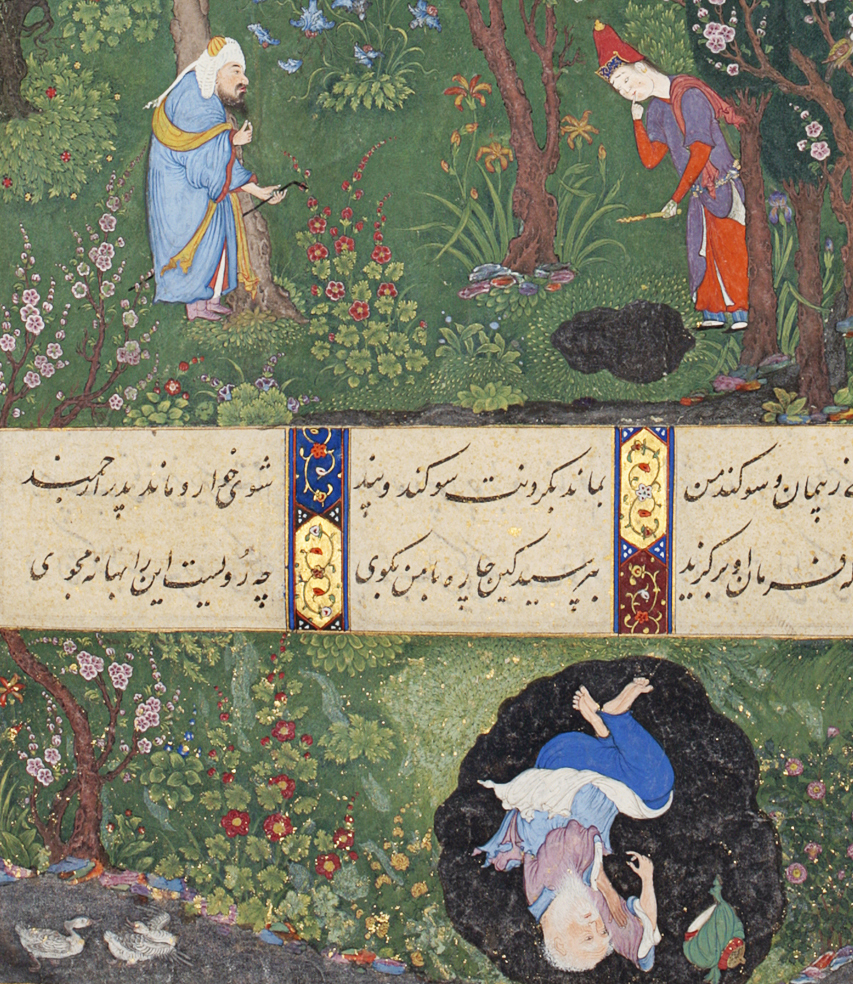
Iblis (left) instigates Zahhak to kill his father, king Mirdas, by digging a hole.

Although not the cause of evil, Iblis is known as the progenitor of tempters, known as the "father of the devils" (Abū ash-Shayāṭīn). Hadith literature emphasizes their evil influences over humans rather than treating them as proper personalities. Muslims are advised to "seek refuge" from such influences and are recommended to recite prayers (duʿāʾ) for protection.

== Sufism ==
Sufi formulations about the mystical union with God, although fundamentally mystical in nature, derive from the theological debates undertaken within the school of kalam. In sum, there are two distinct interpretations of the role of Iblis within the Sufi tradition.

The first interpretation holds that Iblis refused to bow before Adam because he would not prostrate himself before anyone but his creator, thus considering Iblis to be a "true monotheist" only bested by Muhammad, an idea known as "Satan's monotheism" (tawḥīd-i Iblīs). Oblivious to rewards and punishment, Iblis acts out of pure love and loyalty and disobeys the explicit command and obeys the hidden will of God. In a unity of opposites, Iblis finds in his banishment proximity to God.

The second interpretation disapproves of Iblis's refusal to prostrate himself before Adam. Adam, as a reflection of God's names, is more complete than the angels. Iblis, being blind to the hidden reality of Adam, refuses to bow due to his own spiritual ignorance.

=== Satan's Monotheism (Tawḥīd-i Iblīs) ===
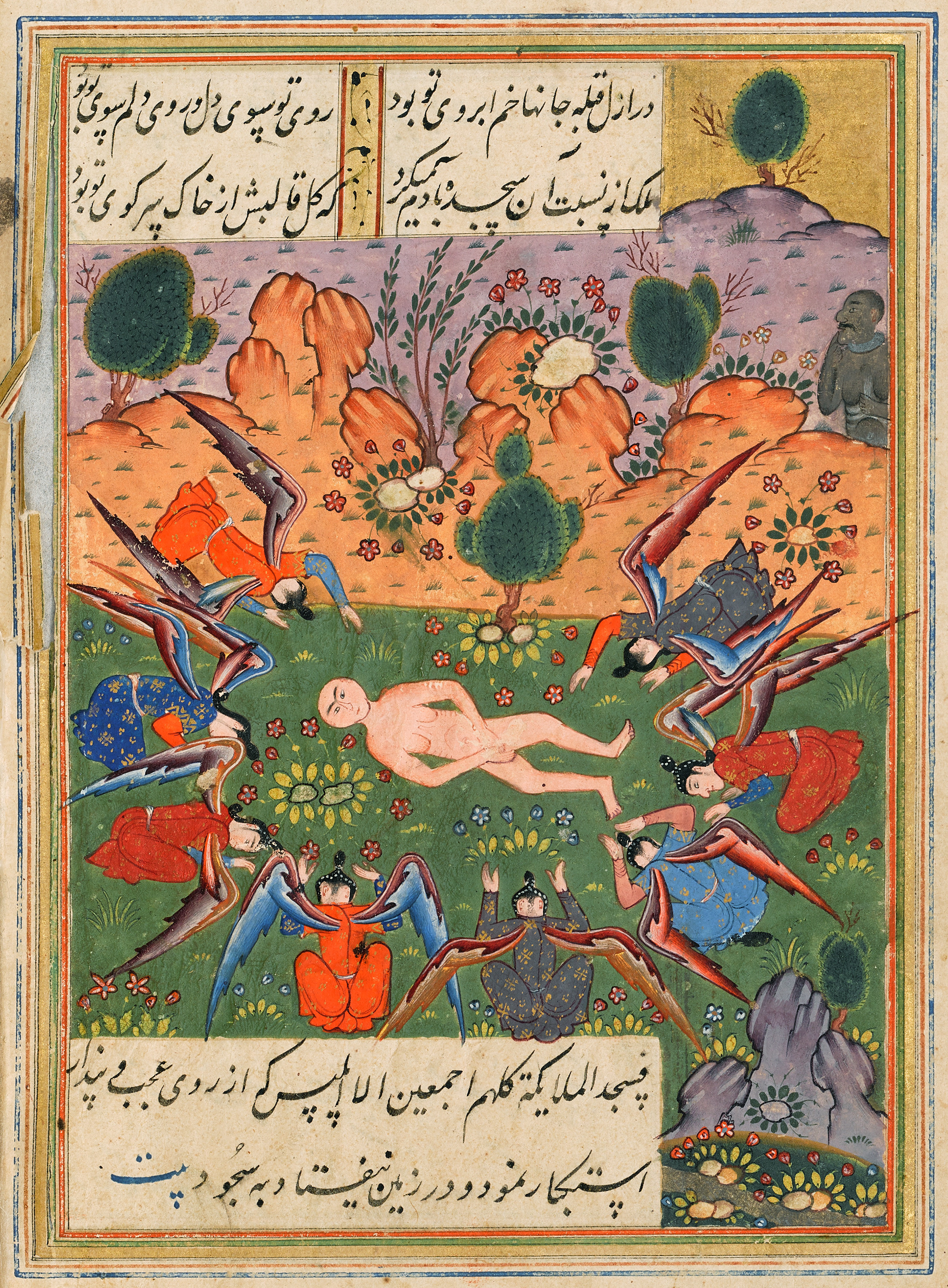
Adam honoured by Angels – Persian miniature. Iblis, black-faced and without hair (top-right of the picture). He refuses to prostrate himself with the other Angels.

Satan's Monotheism is illustrated in a story attributed to Wahb ibn Munabbih. Accordingly, Moses met Iblis on the slopes of Sinai. When Moses asks Iblis for the reason behind his disobedience, Iblis replies that the command was a test. This story is mentioned in the Kitāb al-Tawāsīn by the Persian poet al-Hallaj, who also became known as one of Iblis's greatest defenders. The idea also inspired later famous theologians and Sufis, including Ahmad Ghazali and Attar of Nishapur.

Ahmad Ghazali depicted Iblis as a paragon of self-sacrifice and devotion, stating: "Whoever doesn't learn monotheism from Satan is a heretic (zindīq)." His student Sheikh Adi ibn Musafir asserted that Iblis's disobedience must have been willed by God, or else God would be powerless, and a powerless being cannot be God.

Other theologians and Sufis disapproved of Satan's Monotheism. Ibn Ghanim argues that Iblis is referring to God's predetermined judgement as an excuse to cover his unbelief. Furthermore, similar to Ruzbihan Baqli, he argues that Satan's Monotheism is a subtle deception by Iblis, made in order to evoke sympathies and doubt about God's message.

Jalāl al-Dīn Muḥammad Rūmī (1207–1273) argues that God's determinism can not be an excuse for one's own demise and failure. He invokes the analogy between Adam and Iblis to highlight the difference between a believer and an unbeliever: While both Adam and Iblis were destined to fall, Iblis and his offspring blamed God, while Adam pleaded for forgiveness, nonetheless. Rumi advises humans to do the same. In this context, Rumi declares that love is more important than intelligence and states: "(Cunning) intelligence is from Iblis, and love from Adam." In his story of Mu'awiya, in his Masnavi (Book 2), Mu'awiya realizes that he cannot outsmart Iblis's excuses, thus seeking refuge in God's protection. At this, Iblis confesses that he only attempts to trick people. Rumi reminds the reader that the Quran emphasizes that Iblis is the enemy of humanity and that there is thus no reason to have sympathies for him.

=== Cosmic veil ===
Within the context of Sufi cosmology, the al-Insān al-Kāmil ("perfected human being") is a manifestation of God's attributes, not in the sense of incarnation, but as a mirror reflecting his divine attributes. In this interpretation, Iblis cannot comprehend the immanent aspect of God's attributes within Adam due to Iblis's own defective spiritual insight, and thus he refuses to bow down. In his attempt to avoid idolatrous treatment of Adam, he becomes the supreme idolater, because he cannot see the immanent aspects of reality through idols (the exterior reality). Since he cannot perceive God's immanent aspect (love), he can only understand (and reflect) God's transcendent aspects (wrath).

According to ibn Arabi and Jami, those who cannot comprehend the unity of God and separate God from his Creation are the disciples of Iblis, unable to discern the underlying, all-pervading divine principle. In his ignorance and damnation, Iblis hovers over the mere surface of visible things, and those he leads astray suffer the same fate. Other Sufi authors, including Sana'i, 'Ayn al-Quzat, Ruzbihan, Attar, and Rumi, independently conceived a similar image of Iblis's function in the cosmos.

In Sufi thought, Iblis is part of God's universe and does not form an exterior reality independent of God. He is God's veil, the visible universe itself, which hides the Godhead from the unworthy. 'Ayn al-Quzat links the cosmic structure to the Shahada: "Lā (no) is the circle of negation. One must place his first step within this circle, but he should not stop here nor dwell here. (...)". Those who remain at the circle of lā, they worship the nafs (carnal desires) instead of God. Only those who proceed to ʾillā 'llāh (except God) surpass Iblis, the divine chamberlain. As such, Iblis unknowingly symbolizes, suffers, and reflects the dark and wrathful aspect of God, uttering God's anger and executes God's justice.

Due to the similarities in function between Iblis's web and the Hindu concept of māyā, the seventeenth-century Mughal prince Dara Shikoh sought to reconcile the Upanishads with Sufi cosmology.

== Narrative exegesis (Qiṣaṣ) ==
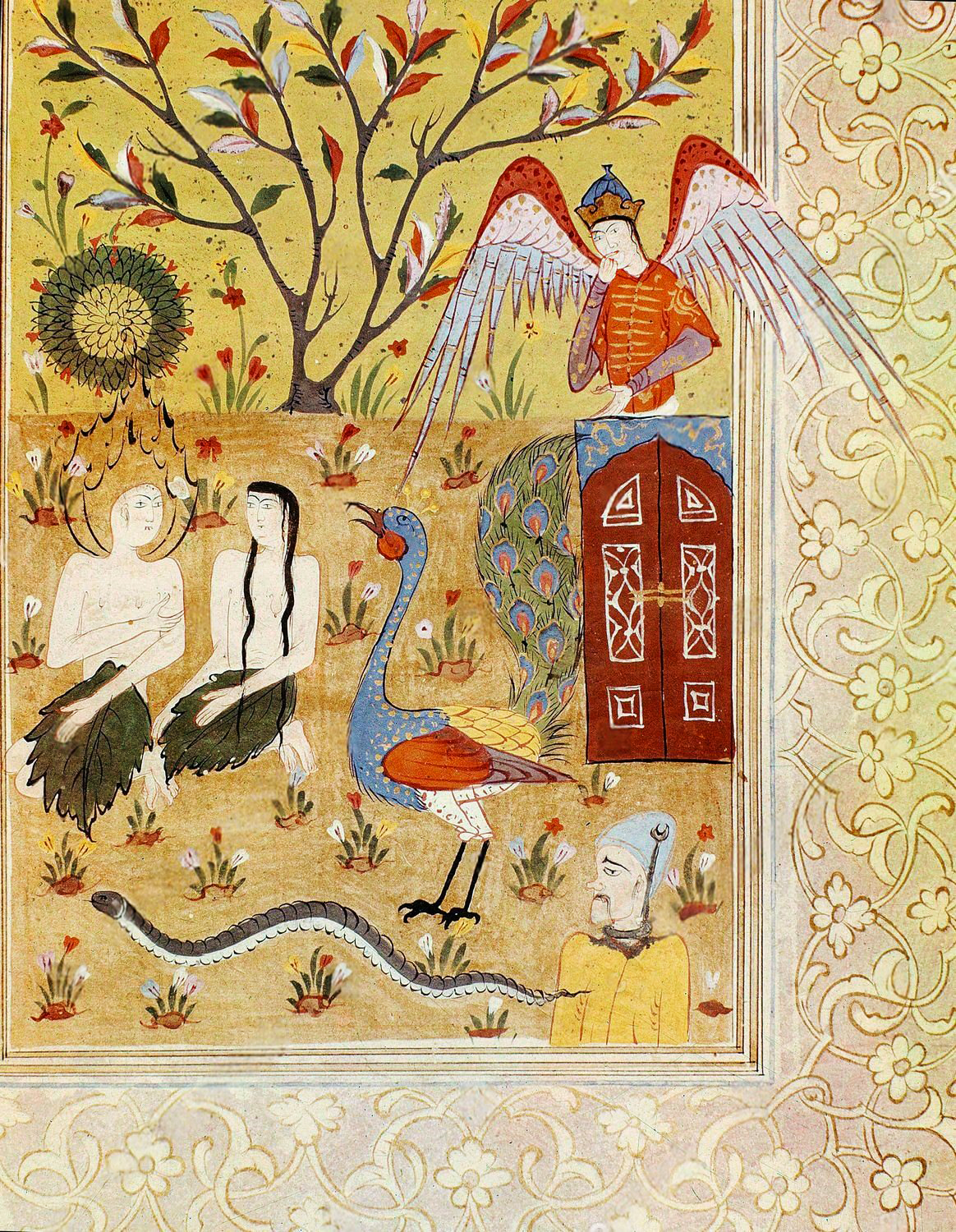
1579 Persian miniature illustrating Naysaburi's Stories of the Prophets. To illustrate Adam's fall it depicts: Adam, Hawa, Iblis, the serpent, the peacock and an angel.

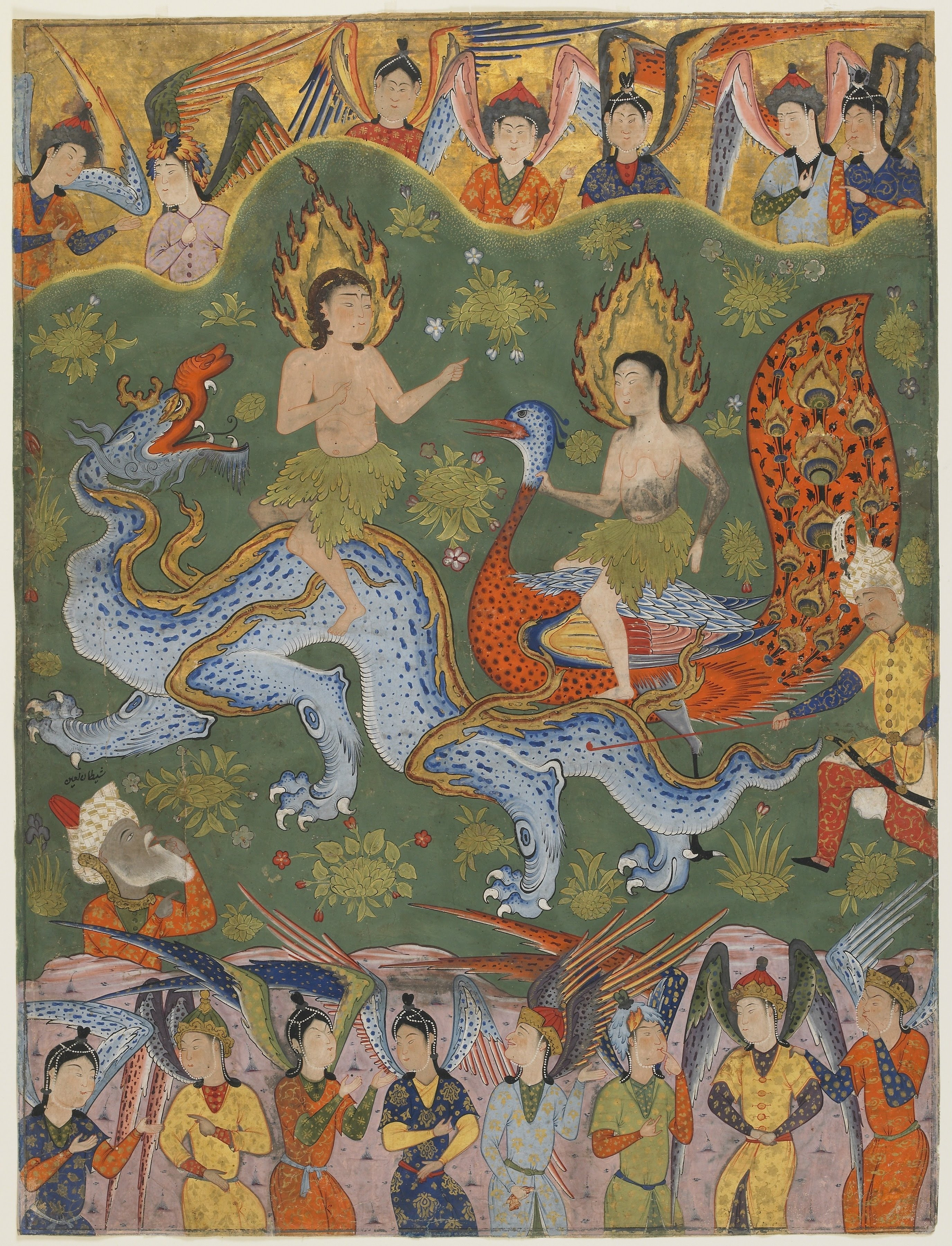
Persian miniature from a manuscript Sādiq's Falname depicting Adam and Eve, the serpent, the peacock, and Iblis, after their expulsion from Eden. Iblis (bottom-left) is depicted archetypally dark.

Qiṣaṣ is a form of exegesis by Muslim scholars focusing on establishing a coherent story from material of Islamic scripture (Quran, ḥadīṯhs). According to many of them, before Adam was created, the jinn, offspring of al-Jānn (الجان), lived on earth. First they were obedient, but over time immorality increased and, when they became infidels, God sent an army of angels, headed by Iblis, called "al-Jinn" (named after paradise, not the genus) to defeat them. These angels were created from nār as-samūm, while the rest of the angels from light, and the genus of jinn from mārijin min nār (smokeless fire).

In reference to the interpretation of the events in Surah 2:30–34, when the angels complain about mankind's potential to shed blood and cause injustice, Islamic hagiographic narratives relate this to the story about angels' battle with the jinn. Tabari and al-Thaʿlabi explain that the angels feared that humanity will become as corrupt as the jinn.

Some later traditions place Iblis among the genus of the jinn instead. In one narration of the Tarikh Khamis, among the masses of infidel jinn only Iblis dedicated his life to worship of God, withdrawing to a high mountain. The angels soon notice him and elevate him to the heavens, where he becomes one like them in worship.

With reference to Surah 76:1, Islamic narrative tradition considers Adam to have been created step-by-step, beginning as an inanimate body. The story is mentioned by various scholars of the Sunni tradition, including Muqatil, Tabari, Mas'udi, Kisa'i, and Tha'labi. According to the story, the angels passing by Adam were scared and Iblis was most afraid among them. To overcome his anxiety, he enters Adam and moves through the body. He concludes that "this is hollow clay", whereas Iblis is "fire". Since fire overcomes clay, he vows to destroy Adam like fire destroys clay:

You are nothing – because of his ringing – and you were made for nothing! If I am to rule over you, I will kill you, and if you are to rule over me, I will rebel against you.

Some scholars (among them Thala'bi, Tabarsi, Diyarbakri) explain, with slight variations, Iblis's entry to the Garden of Eden by the aid of a serpent and a peacock. Some traditions have the Garden of Eden being warded by an angelic guardian. Thus, Iblis persuades a peacock to get help, by promising him that, if he enters the Garden, the beauty of the peacock will never decay thanks to the fruit of immortality. The peacock, unable to carry Iblis, persuades the serpent, who decides to slip Iblis by carrying him in his mouth. From the mouth of the serpent, Iblis speaks to Adam and Ḥawwāʾ.

== In culture ==
=== In arts ===
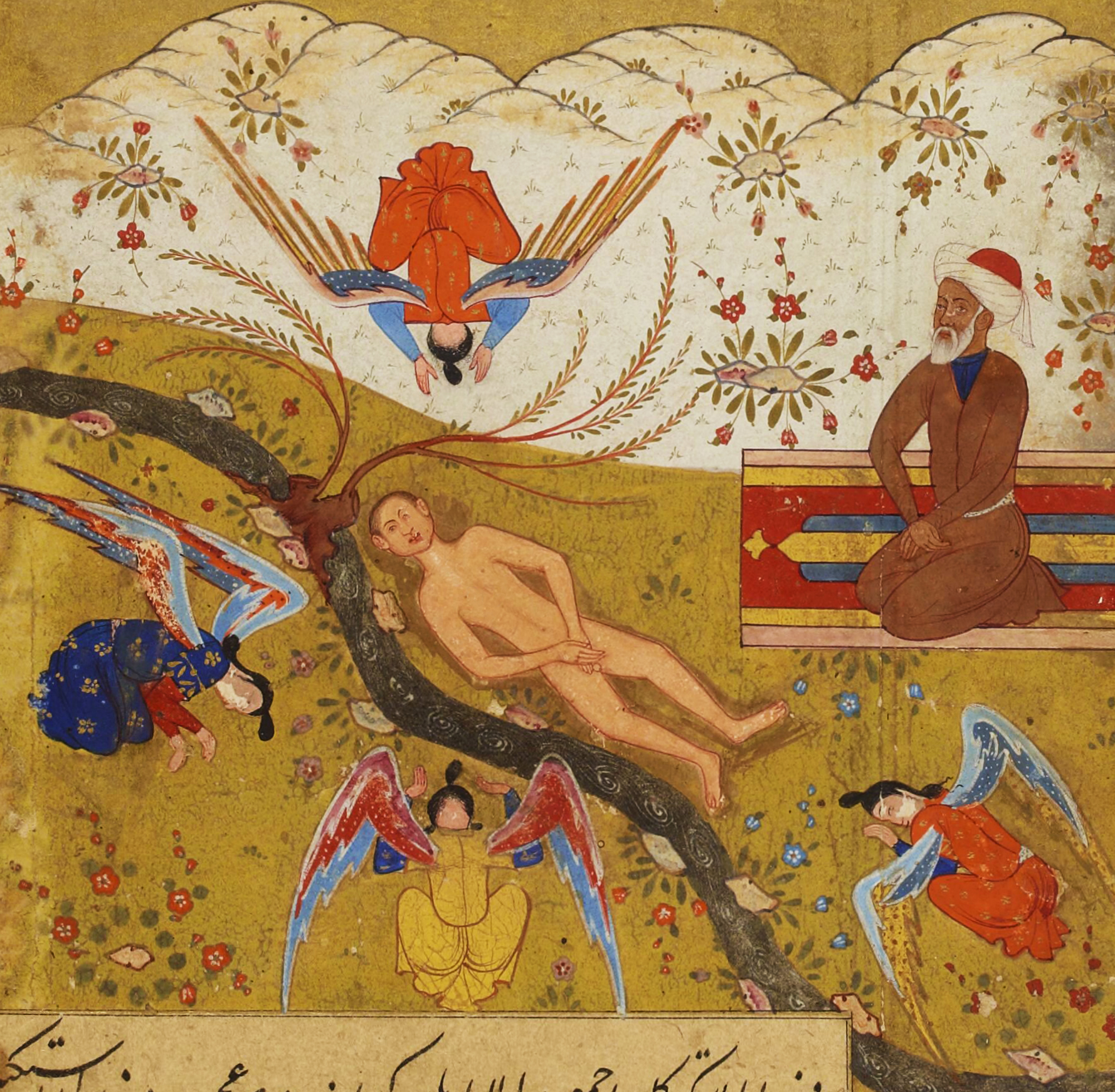
Another miniature of angels prostrating before Adam with Iblis refusing, here depicted with a head cover

Iblis is perhaps one of the most well-known individual supernatural entities in Islamic tradition and was depicted in multiple visual representations like the Quran and Manuscripts of Bal‘ami's ‘Tarjamah-i Tarikh-i Tabari. Iblis was a unique individual, described as both a pious jinni and an angel before he fell from God's grace when he refused to bow before the prophet Adam. After this incident, Iblis turned into a shaytan. In visual appearance, Iblis's depiction was described in On the Monstrous in the Islamic Visual Tradition by Francesca Leoni as a being with a human-like body with flaming eyes, a tail, claws, and large horns on a grossly disproportionate large head. Illustrations of Iblis in Islamic paintings often depict him black-faced, a feature which would later symbolize any satanic figure or heretic, and with a black body, to symbolize his corrupted nature. Another common depiction of Iblis shows him in human form wearing a special head covering, clearly different from the traditional Islamic turban and long sleeves, signifying long lasting devotion to God. Only in one, he wears traditional Islamic head covering.

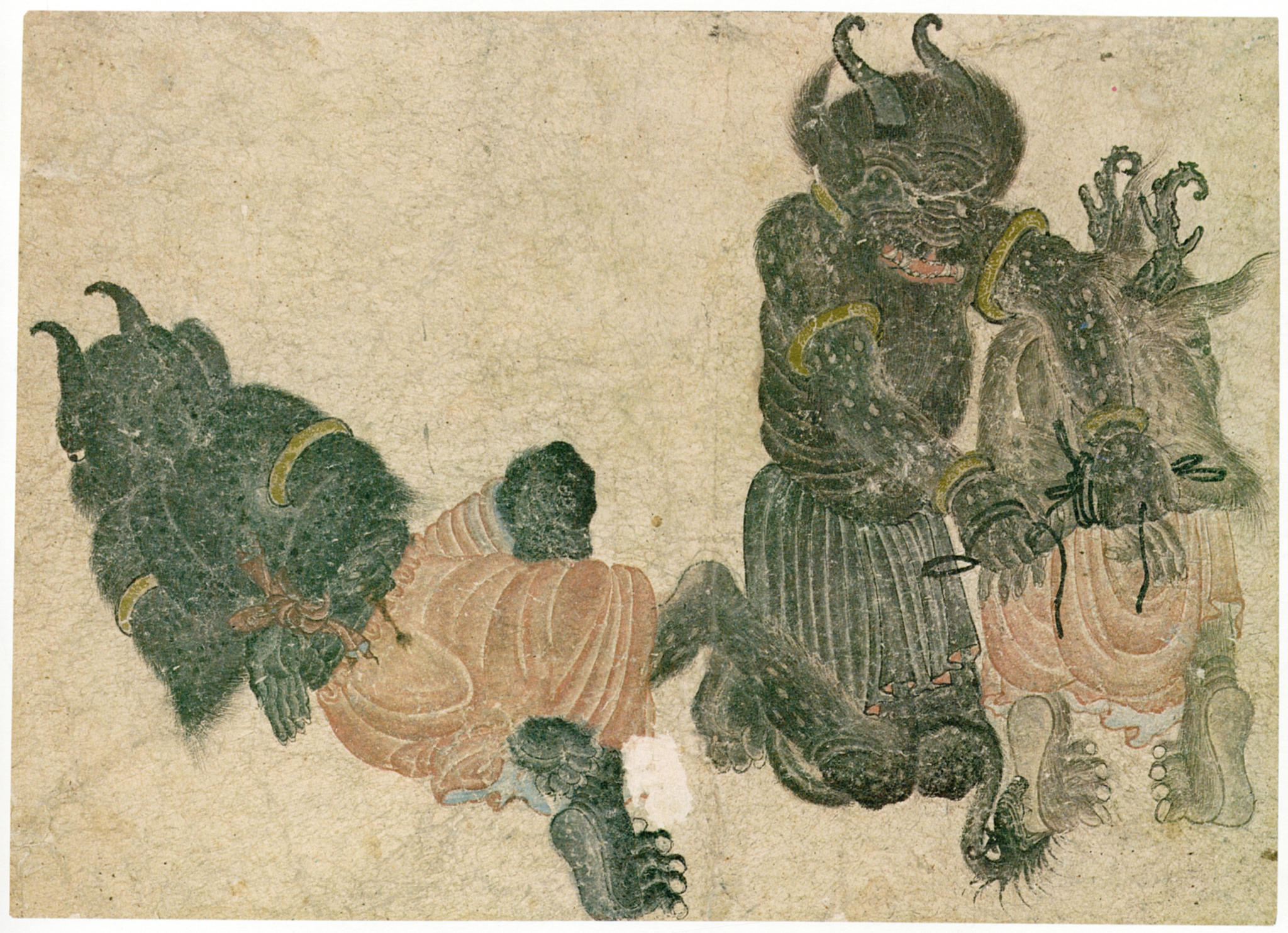
Portrayal of Islamic devils in the form of wild monsters. Siyah Qalem - Hazine 2153, s.31b

Most pictures show and describe Iblis at the moment, when the angels prostrate themselves before Adam. In the manuscripts of Bal‘ami's ‘Tarjamah-i Tarikh-i Tabari he is usually seen beyond the outcrop, his face transformed with his wings burned, to the envious countenance of a devil. In his demonic form, Iblis is portrayed similar to his cohorts (shayāṭīn) in Turko-Persian art as Asian demons (Dīv). They are bangled creatures with flaming eyes, only covered by a short skirt. Similar to European arts depicting devils by traits of pagan deities, Islamic arts portray the devils with features often similar to that of Hindu deities.

=== In literature and film ===
The complexity of Iblis's character from the Quranic story had lasting influence on Islamic literature. It elaborates on the necessity of evil and Iblis's disobedience in creative retelling of the exegetical tradition.

Iblis and the angels feature in Hafez's poetry (1325–1390), collected in The Divān of Hafez. Hafez iterates that angels are incapable of love. They can merely praise the creator but without the passion of a human-being. When Iblis protests, either because he considers Adam's offspring unworthy or himself devoted to God alone, he is described as an imposter (mudda'ī). He claims to act for the sake of God's love, but is actually envious of mankind's exalted position. Hafez advises his audience not to reveal the secrets of love towards God to the imposter.

Muhammad Iqbal's Javid Nama deal in length with the question of Good and Evil. As such, it is little surprising that Iblis plays a significant role in his works. Similar to Goethe's Mephistopheles, Iblis is a necessary obstacle for man to overcome. Only when man eventually resists and overcomes Iblis, he can finally prostrate himself and find salvation.

Egyptian novelist Tawfiq al-Hakim's ash-Shahid (1953) describes the necessity of Iblis's evil for the world. One day, Iblis regrets his rebellion and consults religious authorities (the Pope, a Rabbi, and the head of the al-Azhar) in order to seek forgiveness. After Iblis's requests were rejected by all of them, he turns to the angel Gabriel, but is rejected again. Then Iblis realizes the necessity of his nature in order for good to exist and exclaims: "I am a martyr!".

A demon called "Semum", from the eponymous 2008 Turkish horror movie Semum, embodies qualities attributed to both Iblis and his offspring. Alluding to the Quran, Semum blames God for abandoning demon-kind after creating humanity and vows to destroy God's newest creatures. Referring to the Quranic cycle of God creating and then destroying his creatures, the "Semum" argues that humanity will be eventually abandoned by God, and should worship Iblis instead.

Iblis himself does not appear, but his presence is implied throughout the movie. Described by his devilish followers, he is the master of the "World of Fire". On the other hand, the exorcist (representing God) describes Iblis imprisoned in the lowest pit of hell. The movie implies Sufistic metaphysics by asserting that "God is everywhere". The demon denies God's omnipresence by asserting that hell belongs to Iblis. His dualistic beliefs are disproven when God intervenes on behalf of the exorcist in hell. Iblis creates merely the illusion of God's absence.

The fifth season of the American TV show Supernatural features Lucifer as the main antagonist. Pavel Nosachev, argues that, despite its Christian roots, the antagonist of the season bears resemblance to the Quranic Iblis. Lucifer reveals his backstory in the fourth episode, declaring:

You know why God cast me down? Because I loved Him, more than anything, and then God created you, the little hairless apes; and then He asked all of us to bow down before you, to love you more than Him. And I said: ‘Father, I can’t.’

== See also ==
- Azazil
- Dante's Satan
- Elbis
- Harut and Marut
- Layla and Majnun
- Prince of Darkness (Manichaeism)
- Questions of Bartholomew
- Samael
