= Ashdown =

Ashdown may refer to:

== People ==
- Ashdown (surname)

== Places ==
United Kingdom

- Ashdown, a historical name for an unspecified region of the Berkshire Downs
  - Battle of Ashdown, 871 A.D.
- Ashdown Forest in East Sussex

United States

- Ashdown, Arkansas
- Ashdown House (disambiguation), several in the UK and the U.S.

== Other uses ==
- Ashdown Engineering, British manufacturer of instrument amplifiers
