= Ashdown (surname) =

Ashdown is an English surname. Notable people with the surname include:

- Bill Ashdown (1898–1979), English cricketer
- David Ashdown (1950–2021), Canadian clergyman and politician
- Doug Ashdown (born 1942), Australian singer-songwriter
- George Ashdown (1851–1939), Canadian politician
- Hugh Ashdown (1904–1977), Bishop of Newcastle
- Isabel Ashdown (born 1970), British author
- James Henry Ashdown (1844–1924), Canadian merchant
- Jamie Ashdown (born 1980), English footballer
- Joe Ashdown (1922–1982), Australian rules footballer
- John Ashdown-Hill (1949–2018), British historian
- Paddy Ashdown (1941–2018), British politician
- Pete Ashdown (born 1967), US businessman and politician
- Peter Ashdown (born 1934), English racing driver
- Richard Ashdown (born 1978), English darts master of ceremonies
- Simon Ashdown, British television writer

== See also ==
- William Ashdowne (1723–1810), English Unitarian preacher
