= Devil in Christianity =

Concept of the personification of evil in Christianity

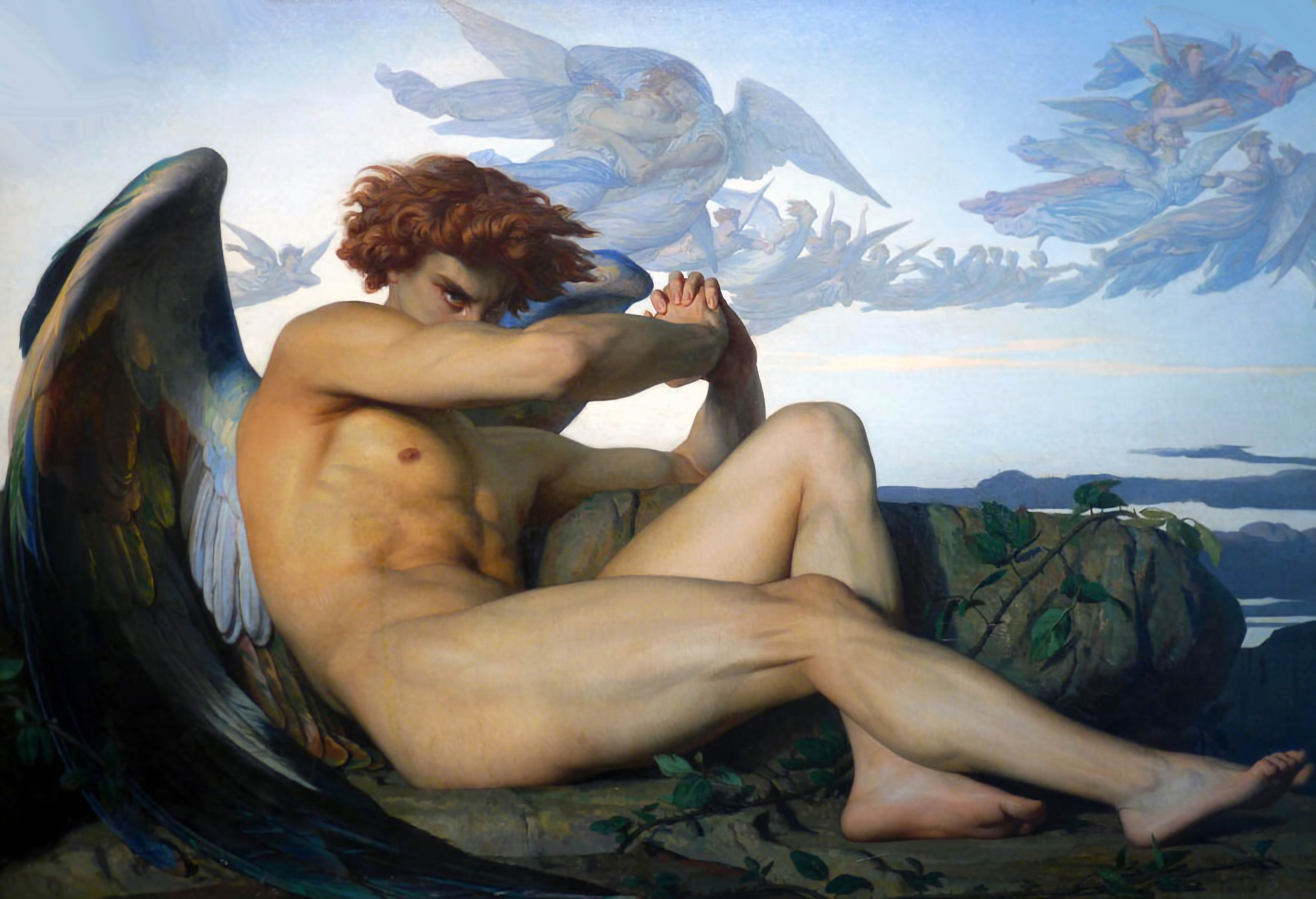
The Fallen Angel (1847) by Alexandre Cabanel

In Christianity, the Devil, also known as Satan, is a malevolent entity that deceives and tempts humans. Frequently viewed as the personification of evil, he is traditionally held to have rebelled against God in an attempt to become equal to God himself. (Note: "By desiring to be equal to God in his arrogance, Lucifer abolishes the difference between God and the angels created by him and thus calls the entire system of order into question (if he were instead to replace God, the system itself would only be preserved with reversed positions)".) He is said to be a fallen angel, who was expelled from Heaven at the beginning of time, before God created the material world, and is in constant opposition to God. In Christian tradition, the Devil has been identified with several biblical figures and motifs, including Lucifer, Satan, the serpent in the Garden of Eden, the tempter of the Gospels, Leviathan, Beelzebub, and the dragon in the Book of Revelation.

Early scholars discussed the role of the Devil. Scholars influenced by neoplatonic cosmology, like Origen and Pseudo-Dionysius, portrayed the Devil as representing deficiency and emptiness, the entity most remote from the divine. According to Augustine of Hippo, the realm of the Devil is not nothingness, but an inferior realm standing in opposition to God. The standard medieval depiction of the Devil goes back to Gregory the Great. He integrated the Devil, as the first creation of God, into the Christian angelic hierarchy as the highest of the angels (either a cherub or a seraph) who fell far, into the depths of hell, and became the leader of demons.

Since the early Reformation period, the Devil has been imagined as an increasingly powerful entity, with not only a lack of goodness but also a conscious will against God, his word, and his creation. Simultaneously, some reformists have interpreted the Devil as a mere metaphor for humans' inclination to sin, thereby downgrading his importance. While the Devil has played no significant role for most scholars in the modern era, he has become important again in contemporary Christianity.

At various times in history, certain Gnostic sects such as the Cathars and the Bogomils, as well as theologians like Marcion and Valentinus, have believed that the Devil was involved in creation. Today these views are not part of mainstream Christianity.

== Old Testament ==
=== Satan in the Old Testament ===
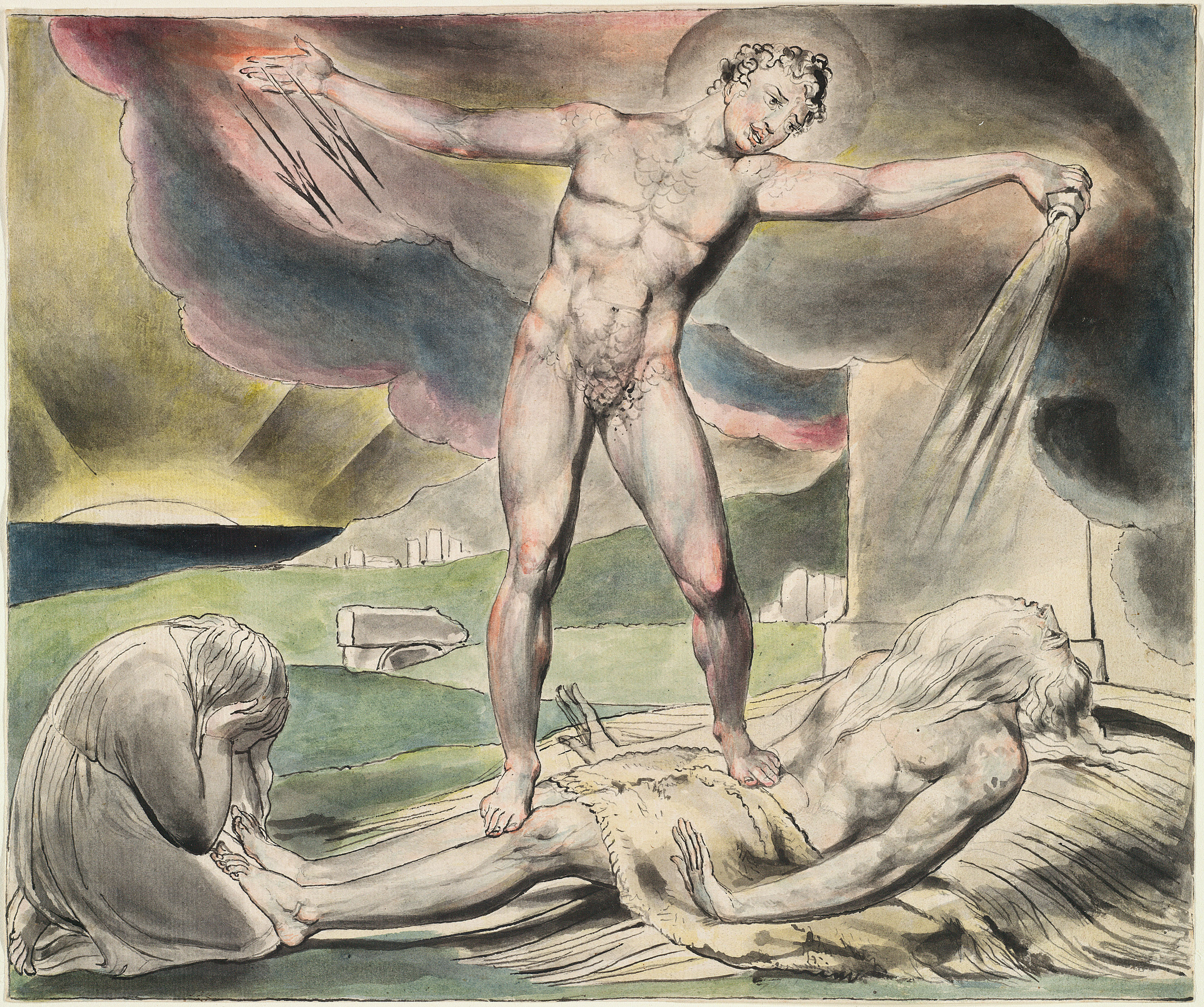
The Examination of Job (c. 1821) by William Blake

The Hebrew term śāṭān (Hebrew: שָּׂטָן) was originally a common noun meaning "accuser" or "adversary" that was applicable to both human and heavenly adversaries. The term is derived from a verb meaning primarily "to obstruct, oppose". Throughout the Hebrew Bible, it refers most frequently to ordinary human adversaries. Such verses include 1 Samuel 29:4; 2 Samuel 19:22; 1 Kings 5:4; 1 Kings 11:14, 23, 25; and Psalms 109:6. However, Numbers 22:22 and 32 use the same term to refer to the angel of the Lord. This concept of a heavenly being as an adversary to humans evolved into the personified evil of "a being with agency" called the Satan 18 times in Job 1–2 and Zechariah 3.

Both Hebrew and Greek have definite articles that are used to differentiate between common and proper nouns, but they are used in opposite ways: in Hebrew, the article designates a common noun, whereas in Greek, the article signals an individual's name (a proper noun). For example, in the Hebrew book of Job, the figure is referred to with the definite article as ha-satan, "the adversary" or "the accuser". In the Greek Septuagint, used by early Christians, ha-satan in Job and Zechariah is rendered as ho diabolos, "the slanderer" or "the accuser", a term that later contributed to Christian usage of "the Devil". In some cases it is unclear which is intended.

Henry A. Kelly says that "almost all modern translators and interpreters" of 1 Chronicles 21:1 (in which satan occurs without the definite article) agree the verse contains "the proper name of a specific being appointed to the office of adversary". Thomas Farrar writes that "In all three cases, satan was translated in the Septuagint as diabolos, and in the case of Job and Zechariah, with ho diabolos (the accuser; the slanderer). In all three of these passages there is general agreement among Old Testament scholars that the referent of the word satan is an angelic being".

In the early rabbinic literature, Satan is never referred to as "the Evil one, the Enemy, belial, Mastema or Beelzebul". No Talmudic source depicts Satan as a rebel against God or as a fallen angel or predicts his end. Ancient Jewish text depicts Satan as an agent of God, a spy, a stool-pigeon, a prosecutor of mankind and even a hangman. He descends to earth to test men's virtue and lead them astray, then rises to Heaven to accuse them.

In the Book of Job, Job is a righteous man favored by God. Job 1:6–8 describes the "sons of God" (bənê hā'ĕlōhîm) presenting themselves before God:

"Sons of God" is a description of 'angels' as supernatural heavenly beings, "ministers of Yahweh, able under His direction to intervene in the affairs of men, enjoying a closer union with Yahweh than is the lot of men. They appear in the earliest books of the Old Testament as well as in the later... They appear in prophetical and sapiential literature as well as in the historical books; they appear in the primitive history and in the most recent history... they usually appear in the Old Testament in the capacity of God's agents to men; otherwise they appear as the heavenly court of Yahweh. They are sent to men to communicate God's message, to destroy, to save, to help, to punish. ...The angels are in complete submission to the will of God... Whenever they appear among men, it is to execute the will of Yahweh."

God asks one of them where he has been. Satan replies that he has been roaming around the earth. God asks, "Have you considered My servant Job?" Satan thinks Job only loves God because he has been blessed, so he requests that God test the sincerity of Job's love for God through suffering, expecting Job to abandon his faith. God consents; Satan destroys Job's family, health, servants and flocks, yet Job refuses to condemn God. At the end, God returned to Job twice what he had lost. This is one of the two Old Testament passages, along with Zechariah 3, where the Hebrew ha-Satan (the Adversary) becomes the Greek ho diabolos (the Slanderer) in the Greek Septuagint used by the early Christian church.

A satan is involved in King David's census and Christian teachings about this satan varies, just as the pre-exilic account of 2 Samuel and the later account of 1 Chronicles present differing perspectives:

And again the anger of the LORD was kindled against Israel, and He moved David against them, saying: 'Go, number Israel and Judah.'

— 2 Samuel 24:1

However, Satan rose up against Israel, and moved David to number Israel.

— 1 Chronicles 21:1

According to some teachings, this term refers to a human being, who bears the title satan while others argue that it indeed refers to a heavenly supernatural agent, an angel. Since the satan is sent by the will of God, his function resembles less the devilish enemy of God. Even if it is accepted that this satan refers to a supernatural agent, it is not necessarily implied this is the Satan. However, since the role of the figure is identical to that of the Devil, viz. leading David into sin, most commentators and translators agree that David's satan is to be identified with Satan and the Devil.

Zechariah's vision of recently deceased Joshua the High Priest depicts a dispute in the heavenly throne room between Satan and the Angel of the Lord (Zechariah 3:1–2). The scene describes Joshua the High Priest dressed in filthy rags, representing the nation of Judah and its sins, on trial with God as the judge and Satan standing as the prosecutor. Yahweh rebukes Satan and orders that Joshua be given clean clothes, representing God's forgiveness of Judah's sins. Goulder (1998) views the vision as related to opposition from Sanballat the Horonite. Again, Satan acts in accordance with God's will. The text implies he functions both as God's accuser and as his executioner.

=== Identified with the Devil ===
Some biblical passages that do not originally refer to Satan or the Devil have been retroactively interpreted in Christian tradition as references to the Devil.

==== The serpent ====
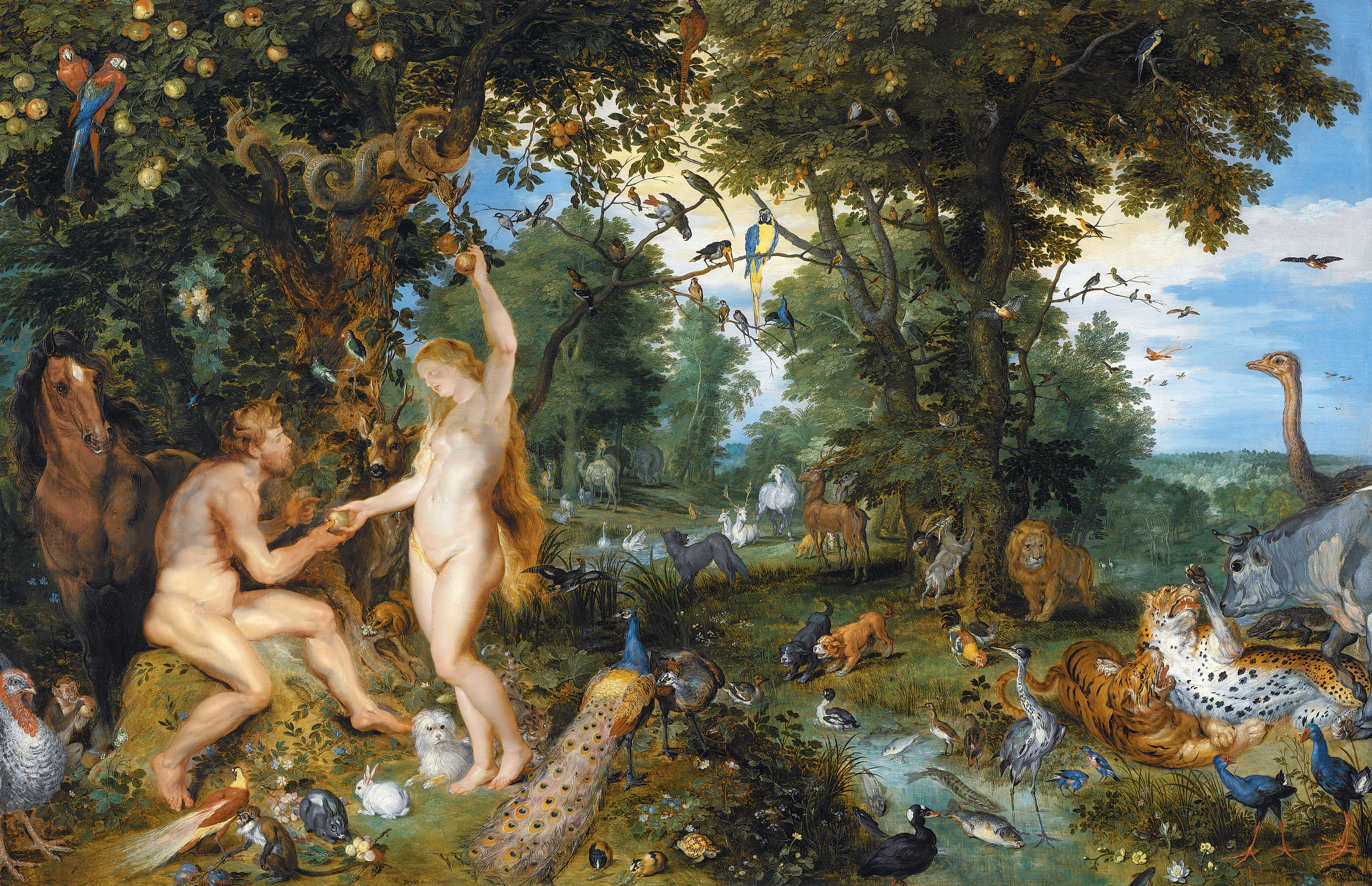
The Garden of Eden with the Fall of Man by Jan Brueghel the Elder and Pieter Paul Rubens, c. 1615, depicting Eve reaching for the forbidden fruit beside the Devil portrayed as a serpent

Genesis 3 mentions the serpent in the Garden of Eden, which tempts Adam and Eve into eating the forbidden fruit from the tree of the knowledge of good and evil, thus causing their expulsion from the Garden. God rebukes the serpent, stating: "I will put enmity between you and the woman, and between your offspring and hers; he will strike your head, and you will strike his heel" (Genesis 3:14–15). Although the Book of Genesis never mentions Satan, Christians have traditionally interpreted the serpent in the Garden of Eden as the Devil due to Revelation 12:9, which describes the Devil as "that ancient serpent called the Devil, or Satan, the one deceiving the whole world; was thrown down to the earth with all his angels." This identification is therefore a later Christian interpretation of Genesis rather than an identification made within the Genesis narrative itself. This chapter is used not only to explain the fall of mankind but also to remind the reader of the enmity between Satan and humanity. It is further interpreted as a prophecy regarding Jesus' victory over the Devil, with reference to the child of a woman, striking the head of the serpent.

==== Lucifer ====
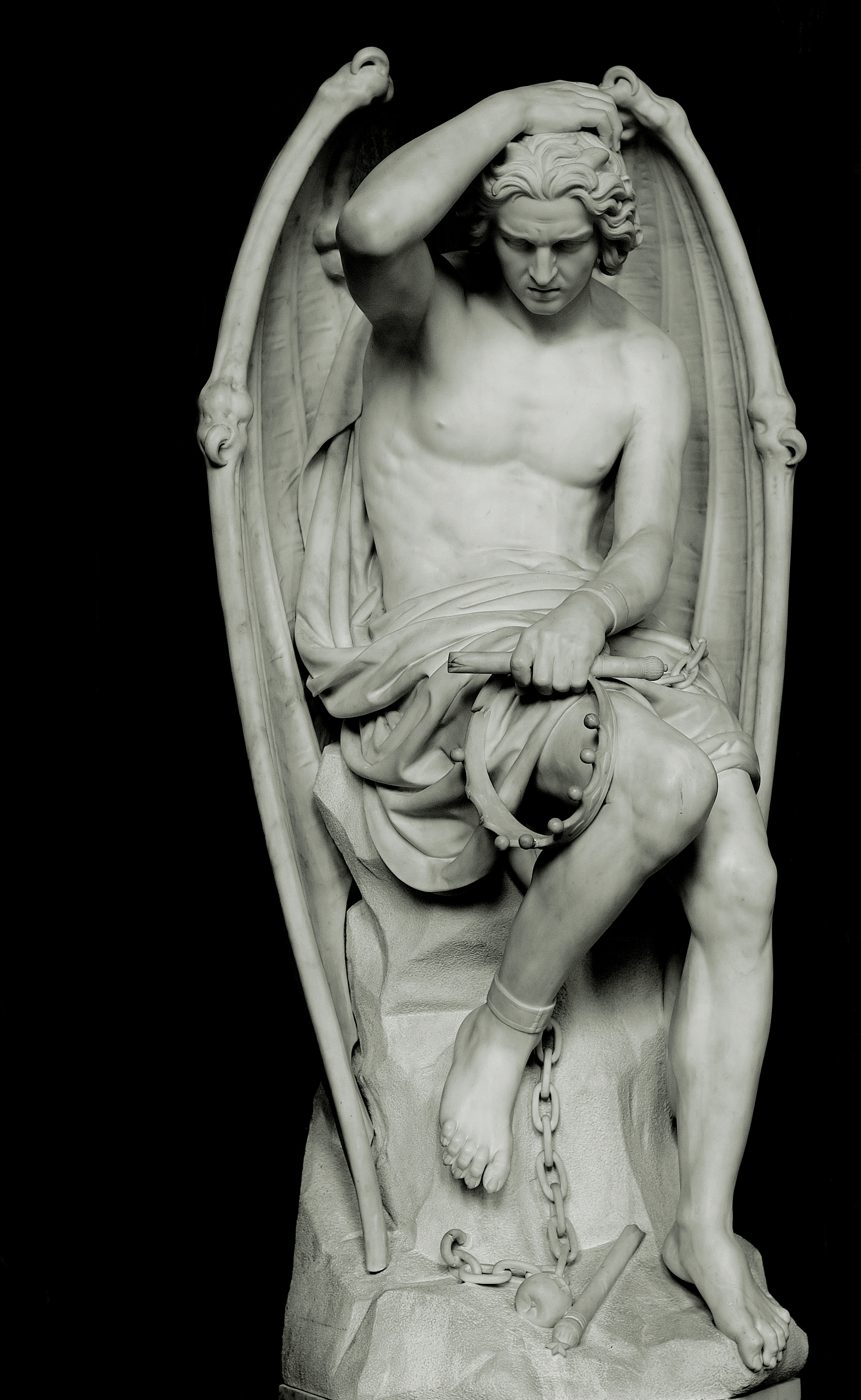
Lucifer (Le génie du mal) by Guillaume Geefs (Cathedral of St. Paul, Liège, Belgium)

The idea of fallen angels was familiar in pre-Christian Hebrew thought from the Book of the Watchers, according to which angels who impregnated human women were cast out of heaven. The Babylonian/Hebrew myth of a rising star, as the embodiment of a heavenly being who is thrown down for his attempt to ascend into the higher planes of the gods, is also found in the Bible (Isaiah 14:12–15), was accepted by early Christians and interpreted as a fallen angel.

Aquila of Sinope derives the word hêlêl, the Hebrew name for the morning star, from the verb yalal 'to lament'. This derivation was adopted as a proper name for an angel who laments the loss of his former beauty. The Christian church fathers—for example Saint Jerome, in his Vulgate—translated this as Lucifer. The equation of Lucifer with the fallen angel probably occurred in 1st-century Palestinian Judaism. The church fathers brought the fallen lightbringer Lucifer into connection with the Devil on the basis of a saying of Jesus in the Gospel of Luke (10.18 EU): "I saw Satan fall from heaven like lightning."

In his work De principiis Proemium and in a homily on Book XII, the Christian scholar Origen compared the morning star Eosphorus-Lucifer with the Devil. According to Origen, Helal-Eosphorus-Lucifer fell into the abyss as a heavenly spirit after he tried to equate himself with God. Cyprian (c. 400), Jerome (c. 345–420), Ambrosius (c. 340–397), and a few other church fathers essentially subscribed to this view. They viewed this earthly overthrow of a pagan king of Babylon as a clear indication of the heavenly overthrow of Satan. In contrast, the church fathers Hieronymus, Cyrillus of Alexandria (412–444), and Eusebius (c. 260–340) saw in Isaiah's prophecy only the mystifying end of a Babylonian king.

==== Cherub in Eden ====
Some scholars use Ezekiel's cherub in Eden to support the Christian doctrine of the Devil:

You were in Eden, the garden of God; every precious stone adorned you: ruby, topaz, emerald, chrysolite, onyx, jasper, sapphire, turquoise, and beryl. Gold work of tambourines and of pipes was in you. In the day that you were created they were prepared. You were the anointed cherub who covers: and I set you, so that you were on the holy mountain of God; you have walked up and down in the midst of the stones of fire. You were perfect in your ways from the day that you were created, until unrighteousness was found in you.

— Ezekiel 28:13–15

This description is used to establish major characteristics of the Devil: that he was created good as a high ranking angel, that he lived in Eden, and that he turned evil on his own accord. The Church Fathers argued that, therefore, God is not to be blamed for evil but rather the Devil's abuse of free will.

==== Belial ====
In the Old Testament, the term belial (בְלִיַּעַל, bĕli-yaal), with the broader meaning of 'worthlessness', denotes those who work against God or at least against God's order. In Deuteronomy 13:14 those who tempt people into worshiping something other than Yahweh are related to belial. In 1 Samuel 2:12, the sons of Eli are called belial for not recognizing Yahweh and violating sacrifice rituals. In Psalm 18:4 and Psalm 41:8, belial appears in the context of death and disease. In the Old Testament, both Satan and belial make it difficult for men to live in harmony with God's will. Belial is thus another template for the later conception of the devil. On the one hand, both Satan and belial cause hardship for humans, but while belial opposes God, represents chaos and death, and stands outside of God's cosmos, Satan, on the other hand, accuses what opposes God. Satan punishes what belial stands for. Unlike Satan, belial is not an independent entity, but an abstraction.

== Intertestamental texts ==
Although not part of the canonical Bible, intertestamental writings shaped the early Christian worldview and influenced the interpretation of the Biblical texts. Until the third century, Christians still referred to these stories to explain the origin of evil in the world. Accordingly, evil entered the world by apostate angels, who lusted after women and taught sin to mankind. The Book of Enoch and the Book of Jubilees are still accepted as canonical by the Ethiopian Church. Many Church Fathers accepted their views about fallen angels, though they excluded Satan from these angels. Satan instead, fell after tempting Eve in the Garden of Eden. Satan was being used as a proper name in the apocryphal Jewish writings such as the Book of Jubilees 10:11; 23:29; 50:5, the Testament of Job, and The Assumption of Moses which are contemporary to the writing of the New Testament.

=== Book of Enoch ===
The Book of Enoch, estimated to date from about 300–200 BC, to 100 BC, tells of a group of angels called the Watchers. The Watchers fell in love with human women and descended to earth to have intercourse with them, resulting in giant offspring. On earth, these fallen angels further teach the secrets of heaven like warcraft, blacksmithing, and sorcery. There is no specific devilish leader, as the fallen angels act independently after they descend to earth, but eminent among these angels are Shemyaza and Azazel. Only Azazel is rebuked by the prophet Enoch himself for instructing illicit arts, as stated in 1 Enoch 13:1. According to 1 Enoch 10:6, God sent the archangel Raphael to chain Azazel in the desert Dudael as punishment.

Satan, on the other hand, appears as a leader of a class of angels. Satan is not among the fallen angels but rather a tormentor for both sinful men and sinful angels. The fallen angels are described as "having followed the way of Satan", implying that Satan led them into their sinful ways, but Satan and his angels are clearly in the service of God, akin to Satan in the Book of Job. Satan and his lesser satans act as God's executioners: they tempt into sin, accuse sinners for their misdeeds, and finally execute divine judgment as angels of punishment.

=== Book of Jubilees ===
The Book of Jubilees also identifies the Bene Elohim ("sons of God") in Genesis 6 with the offspring of fallen angels, adhering to the Watcher myth known from the Book of Enoch. Throughout the book, another wicked angel called Mastema is prominent. Mastema asks God to spare a tenth of the demons and assign them under his domain so that he might prove humanity to be sinful and unworthy. Mastema is the first figure who unites the concept Satan and Belial. Morally questionable actions ascribed to God in the Old Testament, like environmental disasters and tempting Abraham, are ascribed to Mastema instead, establishing a satanic character distant from the will of God in contrast to early Judaism. Still, the text implies that Mastema is a creature of God, although contravening his will. In the end times, he will be extinguished.

== New Testament ==
=== Gospels ===
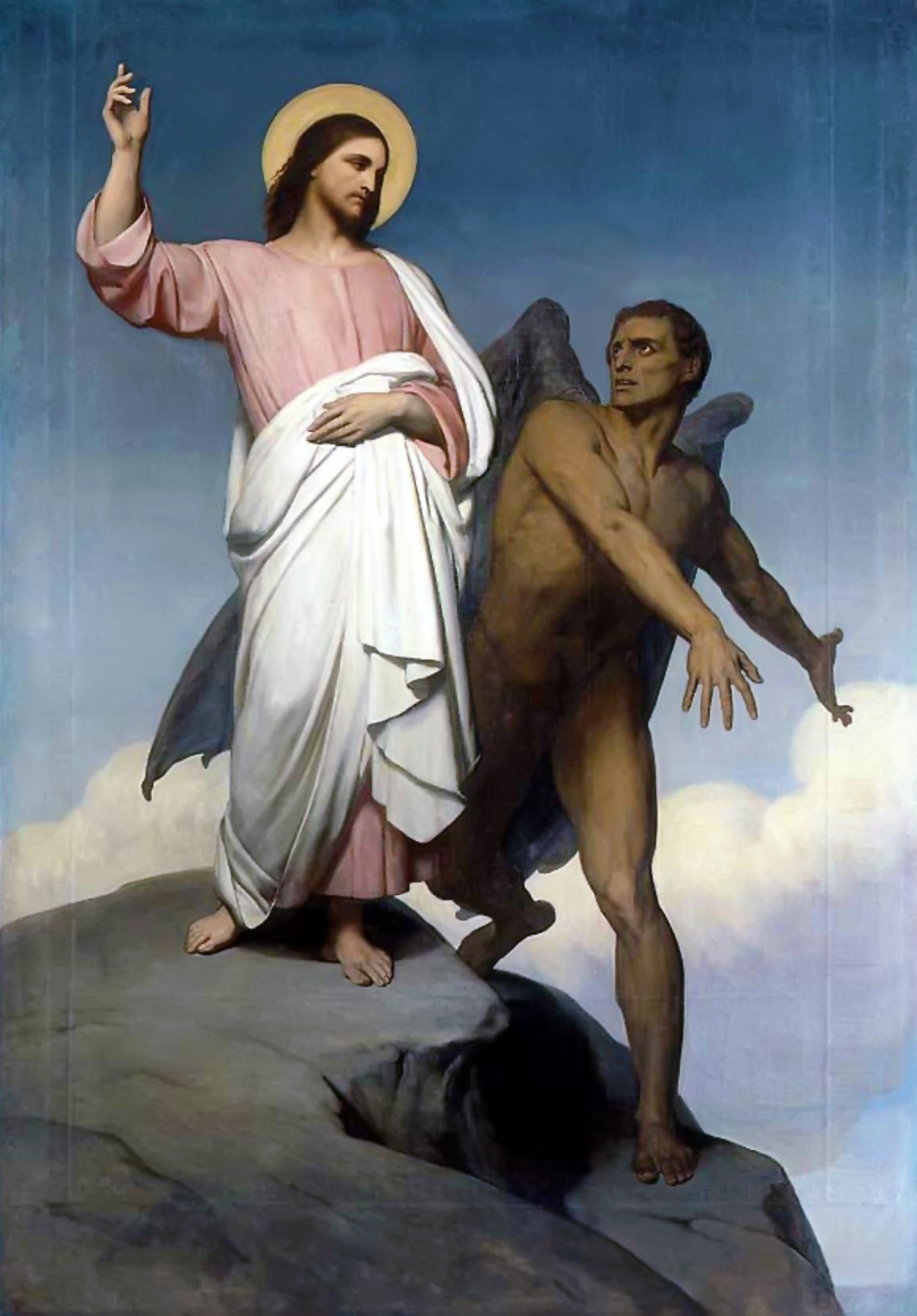
The Devil depicted in The Temptation of Christ, by Ary Scheffer, 1854.

The Devil figures much more prominently in the New Testament and in Christian theology than in the Old Testament and Judaism. Religion scholar William Caldwell writes that "In the Old Testament we have seen that the figure of Satan is vague. ... In reaching the New Testament we are struck by the unitariness, clearness, and definiteness of the outline of Satan." The New Testament Greek word for the Devil, satanas, which occurs 38 times in 36 verses, is not actually a Greek word: it is transliterated from Aramaic, but is ultimately derived from Hebrew. Scholars agree that "Satan" is always a proper name in the New Testament. In Mark 1:13 ho Satanas is a proper name that identifies a particular being with a distinct personality:

The figure whom Mark designates as the perpetrator of Jesus' Wilderness temptation, whether called Satan or one of a host of other names, was not an 'unknown quantity'. On the contrary, in Mark's time and in the thought world which Mark and his audience shared, Satan's identity and the activities characteristic of him were both well-defined and widely known.

Although in later Christian theology, the Devil and his fellow fallen angels are often merged into one category of demonic spirits, the Devil is a unique entity throughout the New Testament. The Devil is not only a tempter but perhaps rules over the kingdoms of earth. In the temptation of Christ (Matthew 4:8–9 and Luke 4:6–7), the Devil offers all kingdoms of the earth to Jesus, implying they belong to him. Since Jesus does not dispute this offer, it may indicate that the authors of those gospels believed this to be true. This interpretation is, however, not shared by all, as Irenaeus argued that, since the Devil was a liar since the beginning, he also lied here and that all kingdoms in fact belong to God, referring to Proverbs 21. This event is described in all three synoptic gospels, (Matthew 4:1–11, Mark 1:12–13 and Luke 4:1–13).

Other adversaries of Jesus are ordinary humans although influence by the Devil is suggested. John 8:40 speaks about the Pharisees as the "offspring of the devil". John 13:2 states that the Devil entered Judas Iscariot before Judas' betrayal (Luke 22:3). In all three synoptic gospels (Matthew 9:22–29, Mark 3:22–30 and Luke 11:14–20), Jesus' critics accuse him of gaining his power to cast out demons from Beelzebub, the Devil. In response, Jesus says that a house divided against itself will fall, and that there would be no reason for the Devil to allow one to defeat the Devil's works with his own power.

=== Acts and epistles ===
The Epistle of Jude makes reference to an incident where the Archangel Michael argued with the Devil over the body of Moses (Jude 1:9). According to the First Epistle of Peter, "Like a roaring lion your adversary the devil prowls around, looking for someone to devour" (1 Peter 5:8). The authors of the Second Epistle of Peter and the Epistle of Jude believe that God prepares judgment for the Devil and his fellow fallen angels, who are bound in darkness until the Divine retribution.

In the Epistle to the Romans, the inspirer of sin is also implied to be the author of death. The Epistle to the Hebrews speaks of the Devil as the one who has the power of death but is defeated through the death of Jesus (Hebrews 2:14). In the Second Epistle to the Corinthians, Paul the Apostle warns that Satan is often disguised as an angel of light.

=== Revelation ===
St. Michael Vanquishing Satan (1518) by Raphael, depicting Satan being cast out of heaven by Michael the Archangel, as described in Revelation 12:7–10

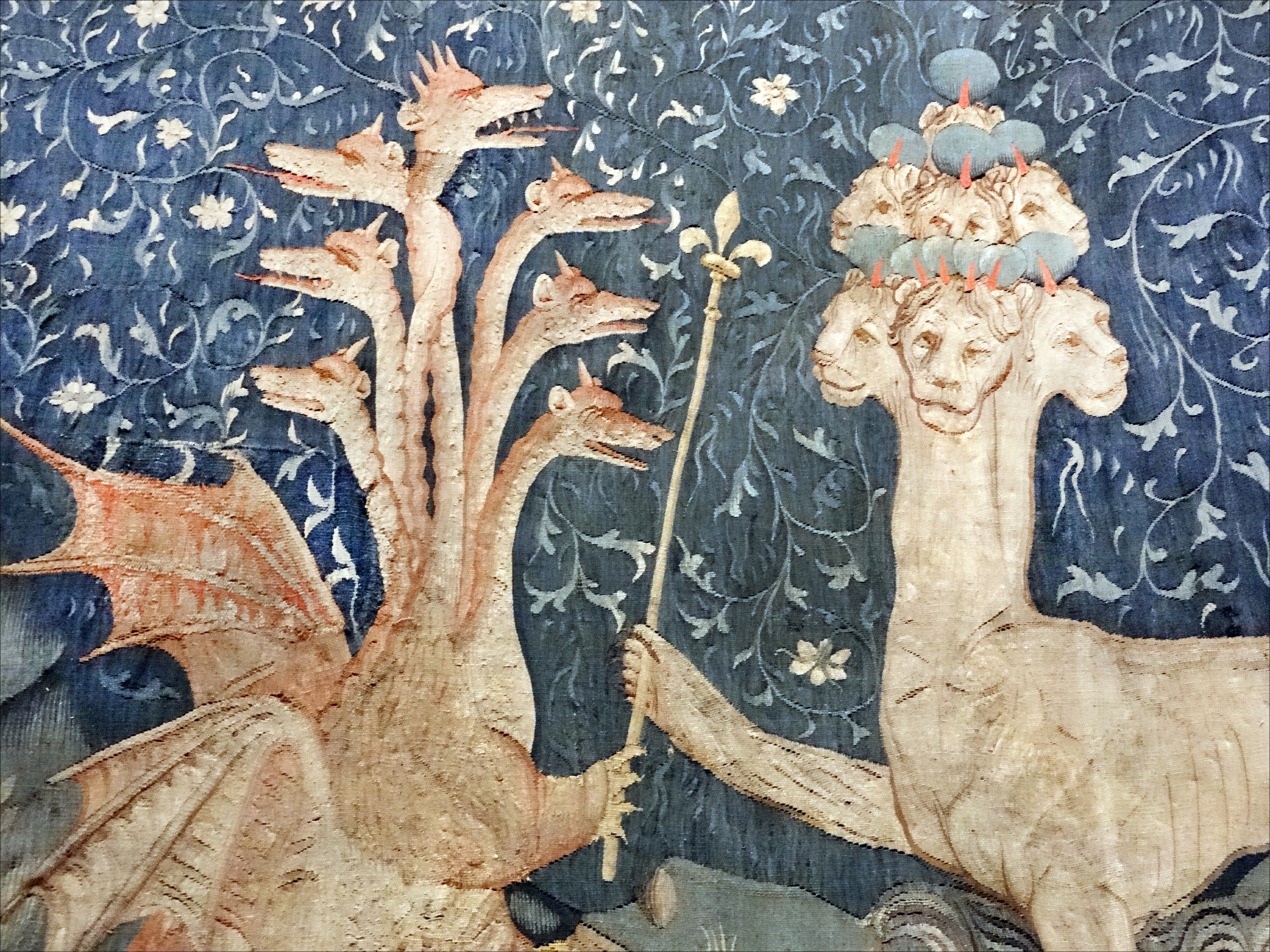
La Bête de la Mer (from the Tapisserie de l'Apocalypse in Angers, France). A medieval tapestry, depicting the devil as a dragon with 7 heads in the Book of Revelation.

The Book of Revelation describes a battle in heaven (Revelation 12:7–10) between a dragon/serpent "called the devil, or Satan" and the archangel Michael resulting in the dragon's fall. Here, the Devil is described with features similar to primordial chaos monsters, like the Leviathan in the Old Testament. The identification of this serpent as Satan supports identification of the serpent in Genesis with the Devil. Revelation 12:9 is one of the clearest New Testament texts linking the dragon, the ancient serpent, the Devil, and Satan into a single apocalyptic figure. This identification became an important basis for later Christian readings of the serpent in Genesis as the Devil. Thomas Aquinas, Rupert of Deutz and Gregory the Great (among others) interpreted this battle as occurring after the Devil sinned by aspiring to be independent of God. In consequence, Satan and the evil angels are hurled down from heaven by the good angels under leadership of Michael.

Before Satan was cast down from heaven, he was accusing humans for their sins (Revelation 12:10). After 1,000 years, the Devil would rise again, just to be defeated and cast into the Lake of Fire (Revelation 20:10). An angel of the abyss called Abaddon, mentioned in Revelation 9:11, is described as its ruler and is often thought of as the originator of sin and an instrument of punishment. For these reasons, Abaddon is also identified with the Devil.

== Christian teachings ==
The concept of fallen angels is of pre-Christian origin. Fallen angels appear in writings such as the Book of Enoch, the Book of Jubilees and arguably in Genesis 6:1–4. Christian tradition and theology interpreted the myth about a rising star, thrown into the underworld, originally told about a Babylonian king (Isaiah 14:12) as also referring to a fallen angel. The Devil is generally identified with Satan, the accuser in the Book of Job. Only rarely are Satan and the Devil depicted as separate entities.

Much of the lore of the Devil is not biblical. It stems from post-medieval Christian expansions on the scriptures influenced by medieval and pre-medieval popular mythology. In the Middle Ages there was a great deal of adaptation of biblical material, in the vernacular languages, that often employed additional literary forms like drama to convey important ideas to an audience unable to read the Latin for themselves. They sometimes expanded the biblical text with additions, explanatory developments or omissions. The Bible has silences: questions it does not address. For example, in the Bible, the fruit Adam and Eve ate is not defined; the apple is part of folklore. In addition to the use of world history and the expansion of Biblical books, additional vehicles for the adornment of Biblical tales were popular sagas, legends, and fairy tales. These provided elaborate views of a dualistic creation where the Devil vies with God, and creates disagreeable imitations of God's creatures like lice, apes, and women. The Devil in certain Russian tales had to intrigue his way on board the Ark in order to keep from drowning. The ability of the Devil, in folk-tale, to appear in any animal form, to change form, or to become invisible, all such powers while nowhere mentioned in the Bible itself, have been assigned to the Devil by medieval ecclesiasticism without dispute.

Maximus the Confessor argued that the purpose of the Devil is to teach humans how to distinguish between virtue and sin. Since, according to Christian teachings, the Devil was cast out of the heavenly presence (unlike the Jewish Satan, who still functions as an accuser angel at service of God), Maximus explained how the Devil could still talk to God, as told in the Book of Job, despite being banished. He argues that, as God is omnipresent within the cosmos, Satan was in God's presence when he uttered his accusation towards Job without being in the heavens. Only after the Day of Judgement, when the rest of the cosmos reunites with God, the Devil, his demons, and all whose who cling to evil and unreality will exclude themselves eternally from God and suffer from this separation.

Christians have understood the Devil as the personification of evil, the author of lies and the promoter of evil, and as a metaphor of human evil. However, the Devil can go no further than God, or human freedom, allows, resulting in the problem of evil. Christian scholars have offered three main theodicies of why a good God might need to allow evil in the world. These are based on the free will of humankind, a self-limiting God, and the observation that suffering has "soul-making" value. Christian theologians do not blame evil solely on the Devil, as this creates a kind of Manichean dualism that, nevertheless, still has popular support.

=== Origen ===
Origen was probably the first author to use Lucifer as a proper name for the Devil. In his work De principiis Proemium and in a homily on Book XII, he compared the morning star Eosphorus-Lucifer—probably based on the Life of Adam and Eve—with the Devil or Satan. Origen took the view that Helal-Eosphorus-Lucifer, originally mistaken for Phaeton, fell into the abyss as a heavenly spirit after he tried to equate himself with God. Cyprian (around 400), Ambrosius (around 340–397) and a few other church fathers essentially subscribed to this view which was borrowed from a Hellenistic myth.

According to Origen, God created rational creatures first then the material world. The rational creatures are divided into angels and humans, both endowed with free will, and the material world is a result of their choices. The world, also inhabited by the Devil and his angels, manifests all kinds of destruction and suffering too. Origen opposed the Valentinian view that suffering in the world is beyond God's grasp and the Devil is an independent actor. Therefore, the Devil is only able to pursue evil as long as God allows. In Origen's cosmology, evil has no ontological reality but is defined by deficits or a lack of existence. Therefore, the Devil is considered most remote from the presence of God, and those who adhere to the Devil's will follow the Devil's removal from God's presence.

Origen has been accused by Christians of teaching salvation for the Devil. However, in defense of Origen, scholars have argued apocatastasis for the Devil is based on a misinterpretation of his universalism. Accordingly, it is not the Devil, as the principle of evil, the personification of death and sin, but the angel, who introduced them in the first place, who will be restored after this angel abandons his evil will.

=== Augustine ===
Augustine of Hippo's work, Civitas Dei (5th century), and his subsequent work On Free Will became major influences in Western demonology into the Middle Ages and even into the Reformation era, influencing notable Reformation theologians such as John Calvin and Martin Luther. For Augustine, the rebellion of Satan was the first and final cause of evil; thus, he rejected earlier teachings about Satan having fallen when the world was already created. In his Civitas Dei, he describes two cities (Civitates) distinct from and opposed to each other like light and darkness. The earthly city is influenced by the sin of the Devil and is inhabited by wicked men and demons (fallen angels) who are led by the Devil. On the other hand, the heavenly city is inhabited by righteous men and the angels led by God. Although his ontological division into two different kingdoms shows a resemblance to Manichean dualism, Augustine differs in regard to the origin and power of evil. He argues that evil came first into existence by the free will of the Devil and has no independent ontological existence. Augustine always emphasized the sovereignty of God over the Devil who can only operate within his God-given framework.

Augustine wrote that angels sinned under differing circumstances than humans did, resulting in different consequences for their actions. Human sins are the result of circumstances an individual may or may not be responsible for, such as original sin. The person is responsible for their decisions, but not the environment or conditions in which their decisions are made. The angels who became demons had lived in Heaven; their environment was grounded and surrounded by the divine; they should have loved God more than themselves, but they delighted in their own power, and loved themselves more, sinning "spontaneously". Because they sinned "through their own initiative, without being tempted or persuaded by anyone else, they cannot repent and be saved through the intervention of another. Hence they are eternally fixed in their self-love (De lib. arb. 3.10.29–31)". Since the sin of the Devil is intrinsic to his nature, Augustine argues that the Devil must have turned evil immediately after his creation. Thus the Devil's attempt to take God's throne is not an assault on the gates of heaven, but a turn to solipsism in which the Devil becomes God in his world.

Further, Augustine rejects the idea that envy could have been the first sin (as some early Christians believed, evident from sources like Cave of Treasures in which Satan has fallen because he envies humans and refused to prostrate himself before Adam), since pride ("loving yourself more than others and God") must precede envy ("hatred for the happiness of others"). Such sins are described as removal from God's presence. The Devil's sin does not give evil a positive value, since evil is, according to Augustinian theodicy, merely a byproduct of creation. The spirits have all been created in the love of God, but the Devil valued himself more, thereby abandoning his position for a lower good. Less clear is Augustine about the reason for the Devil's choosing to abandon God's love. In some works, he argued that it is God's grace that gives the angels a deeper understanding of God's nature and the order of the cosmos. Illuminated by God-given grace, they became incapable of feeling any desire for sin. The other angels, however, are not blessed with grace and act sinfully.

=== Anselm of Canterbury ===
Anselm of Canterbury describes the reason for the Devil's fall in his De Casu Diaboli ("On the Devil's Fall"). Breaking with Augustine's diabology, he absolved God from pre-determinism and causing the Devil to sin. Like earlier theologians, Anselm explained evil as nothingness, or something people can merely ascribe to something to negate its existence that has no substance in itself. God gave the Devil free will, but has not caused the Devil to sin by creating the condition to abuse this gift. Anselm invokes the idea of grace, bestowed upon the angels. According to Anselm, grace was also offered to Lucifer, but the Devil willingly refused to receive the gift from God. Anselm argues further that all rational creatures strive for good, since it is the definition of good to be desired by rational creatures, so Lucifer's wish to become equal to God is actually in accordance with God's plan. (Note: "The striving of the rational creatures for equality with God corresponds entirely to the divine will to create if it is pursued because it corresponds to the will of God. This is exactly where the 'disorder' of the will of Lucifer lies: He equates himself with God because he does it of his own Will (propria voluntas), which was not subordinate to anyone, wanted.") The Devil deviates from God's plans when he wishes to become equal to God by his own efforts without relying on God's grace.

Anselm also played an important role in shifting Christian theology further away from the ransom theory of atonement, the belief that Jesus' crucifixion was a ransom paid to Satan, in favor of the satisfaction theory. According to this view, humanity sinned by violating the cosmic harmony God created. To restore this harmony, humanity needed to pay something they did not owe to God. But since humans could not pay the price, God had to send Jesus, who is both God and human, to sacrifice himself. The Devil does not play an important role in this theory of atonement any longer. In Anselm's theology, the Devil features more as an example of the abuse of free will than as a significant actor in the cosmos. He is not necessary to explain either the fall or the salvation of humanity.

== History ==
=== Early Christianity ===
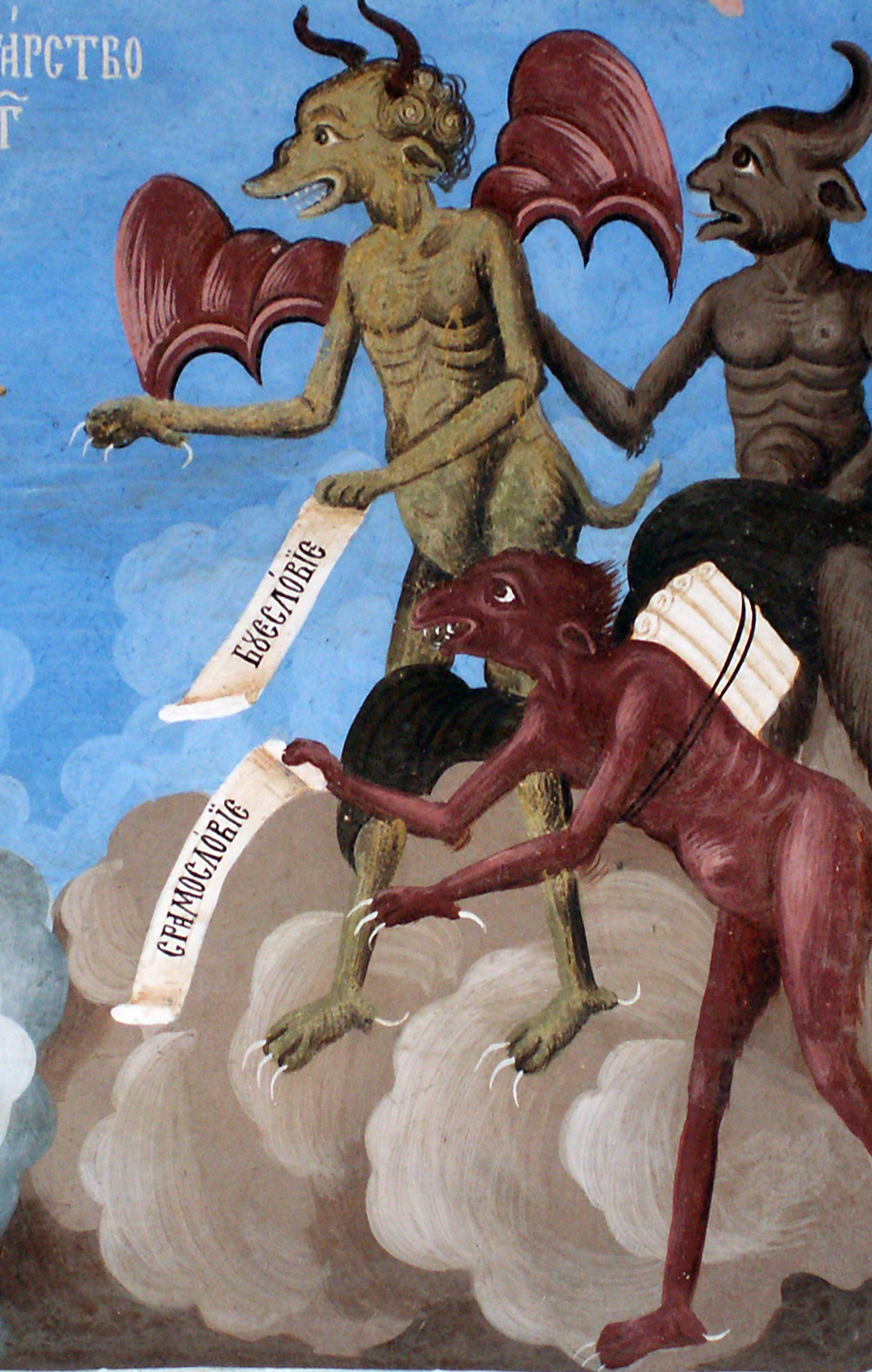
Devils - a fresco detail from the Rila Monastery, Bulgaria

The notion of fallen angels already existed, but had no unified narrative in Pre-Christian times. In 1 Enoch, Azazel and his host of angels came to earth in human shape and taught forbidden arts resulting in sin. In the Apocalypse of Abraham, Azazel is described with his own Kavod (Magnificence), a term usually used for the Divine in apocalyptic literature, already indicating the Devil as the anti-thesis of God, with the Devil's kingdom on earth and God's kingdom in heaven. In the Life of Adam and Eve, Satan was cast out of heaven for his refusal to prostrate himself before man, likely the most common explanation for Satan's fall in Proto-orthodox Christianity.

Christianity, however, depicted the fall of angels as an event prior to the creation of humans. The Devil becomes considered a rebel against God, by claiming divinity for himself; he is allowed to have temporary power over the world. Thus, in prior depictions of the fallen angels, the evil angel's misdemeanor is directed downwards (to man on earth) while, with Christianity, the Devil's sin is directed upwards (to God). Although the Devil is considered to be inherently evil, influential Christian scholars, like Augustine and Anselm of Canterbury, agree that the Devil had been created good but, at some point, had freely chosen evil, resulting in his fall.

In early Christianity, some movements postulated a distinction between the God of Law, creator of the world and the God of Jesus Christ. Such positions were held by Marcion, Valentinus, Basilides and Ophites, who denied the Old Testamental deity to be the true God, arguing that the descriptions of the Jewish deity are blasphemous for God. They were opposed by those like Irenaeus, Tertullian and Origen who argued that the deity presented by Jesus and the God of Jews are the same, and who, in turn, accused such movements as blaspheming against God by asserting a power higher than the Creator. As evident from Origen's On the First Principles, those who denied the Old Testamental deity to be the true God argued that God can only be good and cannot be subject to inferior emotions like anger and jealousy. Instead, they accused him of self-deification, thus identifying him with Lucifer (Hêlêl), the opponent of Jesus and ruler of the world.

However, not all dualistic movements equated the Creator with the Devil. In Valentinianism, the Creator is merely ignorant, but not evil, trying to fashion the world as good as he can, but lacking the proper power to maintain its goodness. Irenaeus writes in Against Heresies that, according to the Valentinian cosmological system, Satan was the left-hand ruler, but actually superior to the Creator, because he would consist of spirit, while the Creator of inferior matter.

=== Byzantium ===
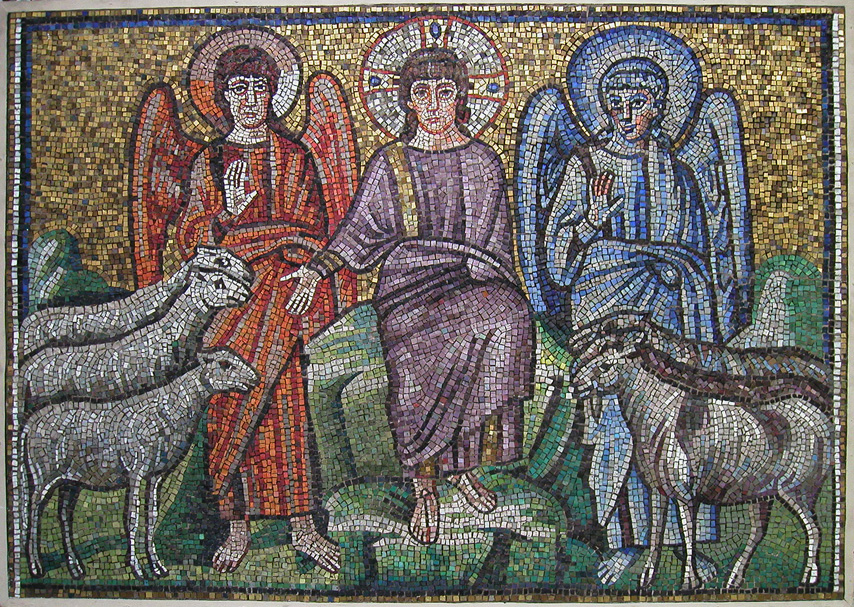
Copy of an early 6th-century mosaic in Sant'Apollinare Nuovo, Ravenna, depicting Christ separating the sheep from the goats. The blue angel is arguably the oldest Christian depiction of Satan, who gathers the sinners symbolized by goats. Here, he is not the fiendish monster known from later iconography, but is granted equal presence in the heavenly court. However, the identification of this figure with Satan is disputed.

Byzantine understanding of the Devil derived mostly from the church fathers of the first five centuries. Due to the focus on monasticism, mysticism and negative theology, which were more unifying than Western traditions, the Devil played only a marginal role in Byzantine theology. Within such monistic cosmology, evil was considered as a deficiency having no real ontological existence. Thus the Devil became the entity most remote from God, as described by Pseudo-Dionysius the Areopagite.

John Climacus detailed the traps of the Devil in his monastic treatise The Ladder of Paradise. The first trap of the Devil and his demons is to prevent people from performing good actions. In the second, one performs good but not in accordance with God's will. In the third, one becomes proud of one's good actions. Only by recognizing that all the good that one can perform comes from God can the last and most dangerous trap be avoided.

John of Damascus, whose works also affected Western scholastic traditions, provided a rebuttal to Dualistic cosmology. Against dualistic religions like Manichaeism, he argued that, if the Devil was a principle independent from God and there are two principles, they must be in complete opposition. But if they exist, according to John, they both share the trait of existence, resulting in only one principle (of existence) again. Influenced by John the Evangelist, he further emphasized the metaphors of light for good and darkness for evil. Like darkness, deprivation of good results in one's becoming non-existent and darker.

Byzantine theology does not consider the Devil as redeemable. Since the Devil is a spirit, the Devil and his angels cannot have a change in their will, just as humans turned into spirits after death are not able to change their attitude either.

=== Early Middle Ages ===
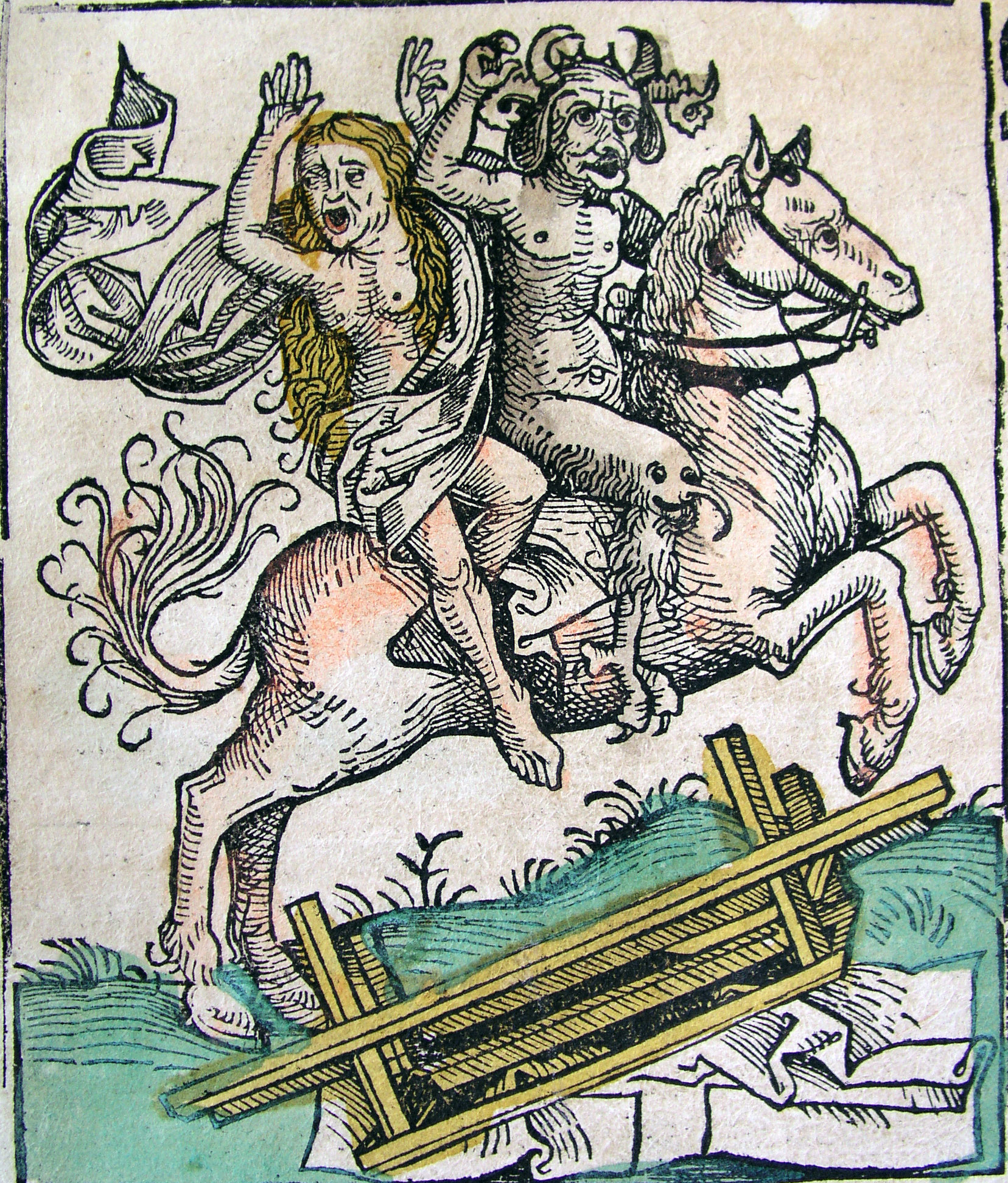
The Devil on horseback. Nuremberg Chronicle (1493).

Although the teachings of Augustine, who rejected the Enochian writings and associated the Devil with pride instead of envy, are usually considered to be the most fundamental depictions of the Devil in medieval Christianity, some concepts like regarding evil as the mere absence of good, were far too subtle to be embraced by most theologians during the Early Middle Ages. They sought a more concrete image of evil to represent spiritual struggle and pain, so the Devil became more of a concrete entity. From the 4th through the 12th centuries, Christian ideas combined with European pagan beliefs, creating a vivid folklore about the devil and introducing new elements. Although theologians usually conflated demons, satans and the Devil, medieval demonology fairly consistently distinguished between Lucifer, the fallen angel fixed in hell, and the mobile Satan executing his will.

Teutonic gods were often considered demons or even the Devil. In the Flateyjarbók, Odin is explicitly described as another form of the Devil, whom the pagans worshiped and to whom they sacrificed. Everything sacred to pagans or the foreign deities was usually perceived as sacred for the Devil and feared by Christians. Many pagan nature spirits like dwarfs and elves became seen as demons, although a difference remained between monsters and demons. The monsters, regarded as distorted humans, probably without souls, were created so that people might be grateful to God that they did not suffer in such a state; they ranked above demons in existence and still claimed a small degree of beauty and goodness as they had not turned away from God.

It was widely accepted that people could make a deal with the Devil by which the Devil would attempt to catch the soul of a human. Often, the human would have to renounce faith in Christ. But the Devil could easily be tricked by courage and common sense and therefore often remained as a comic relief character in folkloric stories. In many German folktales, the Devil replaces the role of a deceived giant, known from pagan tales. For example, the Devil builds a bridge in exchange for the first passing being's soul, then people let a dog pass the bridge first and the Devil is cheated.

Pope Gregory the Great's doctrines about the Devil became widely accepted during the medieval period and, combined with Augustine's view, became the standard account of the Devil. Gregory described the Devil as the first creation of God. He was a cherub and leader of the angels (contrary to the Byzantine writer Pseudo-Dionysius, who did not place the Devil among the angelic hierarchy). Gregory and Augustine agreed with the idea that the Devil fell because of his own will; nevertheless, God held ultimate control over the cosmos. To support his argument, Gregory paraphrases parts of the Old Testament according to which God sends an evil spirit. However, the Devil's will is indeed unjust; God merely diverts the evil deeds to justice. For Gregory, the Devil is thus also the tempter. The tempter incites, but it is the human will that consents to sin. The Devil is only responsible for the first stage of sinning.

=== Cathars and Bogomiles ===
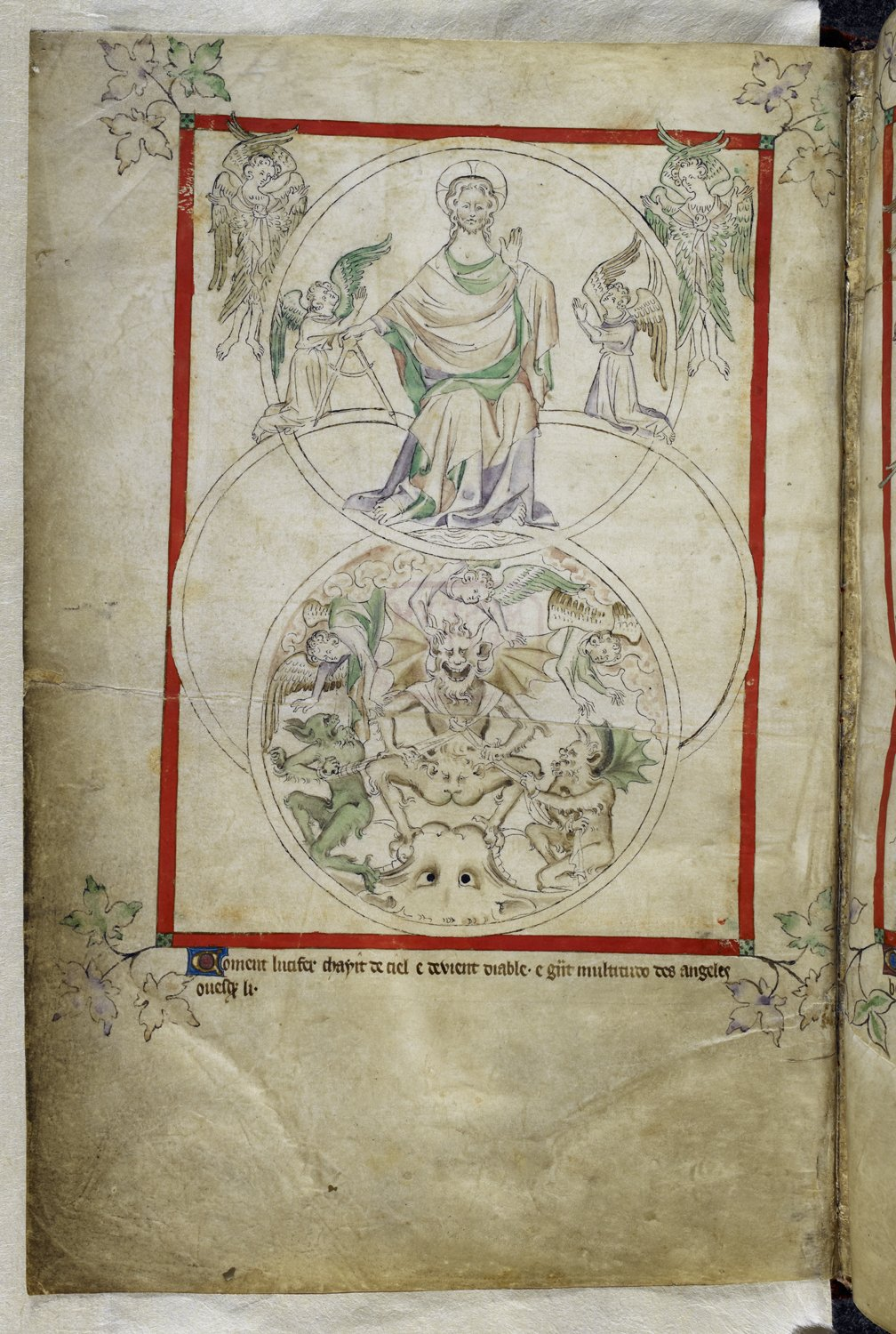
God and Lucifer – The Queen Mary Psalter (1310–1320), f.1v – BL Royal MS 2 B VII

The revival of dualism in the 12th century by Catharism deeply influenced Christian perceptions on the Devil. What is known of the Cathars largely comes in what is preserved by the critics in the Catholic Church which later destroyed them in the Albigensian Crusade. Alain de Lille, c. 1195, accused the Cathars of believing in two gods, one of light and one of darkness. Durand de Huesca, responding to a Cathar tract c. 1220 indicates that they regarded the physical world as the creation of Satan. A former Italian Cathar turned Dominican, Sacchoni in 1250 testified to the Inquisition that his former co-religionists believed that the Devil made the world and everything in it.

Catharism probably roots in Bogomilism, founded by Theophilos in the 10th century, who in turn owed many ideas to the earlier Paulicians in Armenia and the Near East and had strong impact on the history of the Balkans. Their true origin probably lies within earlier sects such as Nestorianism, Marcionism and Borboritism, who all share the notion of a docetic Jesus. Like these earlier movements, Bogomilites agree upon a dualism between body and soul, matter and spirit, and a struggle between good and evil. Rejecting most of the Old Testament, they opposed the established Catholic Church whose deity they considered to be the Devil. Among the Cathars, there have been both an absolute dualism (shared with Bogomilites and early Christian Gnosticism) and mitigated dualism as part of their own interpretation.

Mitigated dualists are closer to Christianity, regarding Lucifer as an angel created (through emanation, since by rejecting the Old Testament, they rejected creation ex nihilo) by God, with Lucifer falling because of his own will. On the other hand, absolute dualists regard Lucifer as the eternal principle of evil, not part of God's creation. Lucifer forced the good souls into bodily shape, and imprisoned them in his kingdom. Following the absolute dualism, neither the souls of the heavenly realm nor the Devil and his demons have free will but merely follow their nature, thus rejecting the Christian notion of sin.

The Catholic church reacted to spreading dualism in the Fourth Council of the Lateran (1215), by affirming that God created everything from nothing; that the Devil and his demons were created good, but turned evil by their own will; that humans yielded to the Devil's temptations, thus falling into sin; and that, after Resurrection, the damned will suffer along with the Devil, while the saved enjoy eternity with Christ. Only a few theologians from the University of Paris, in 1241, proposed the contrary assertion, that God created the Devil evil and without his own decision.

After the collapse of the Ottoman Empire, parts of Bogomil Dualism remained in Balkan folklore concerning creation: before God created the world, he meets a goose on the eternal ocean. The name of the Goose is reportedly Satanael and it claims to be a god. When God asks Satanael who he is, the Devil answers "the god of gods". God requests that the Devil then dive to the bottom of the sea to carry some mud, and from this mud, they fashioned the world. God created his angels, and the Devil created his demons. Later, the Devil tries to assault god but is thrown into the abyss. He remains lurking on the creation of God and planning another attack on heaven. This myth shares some resemblance with Pre-Islamic Turkic creation myths as well as Bogomilite thoughts.

=== The Reformation ===
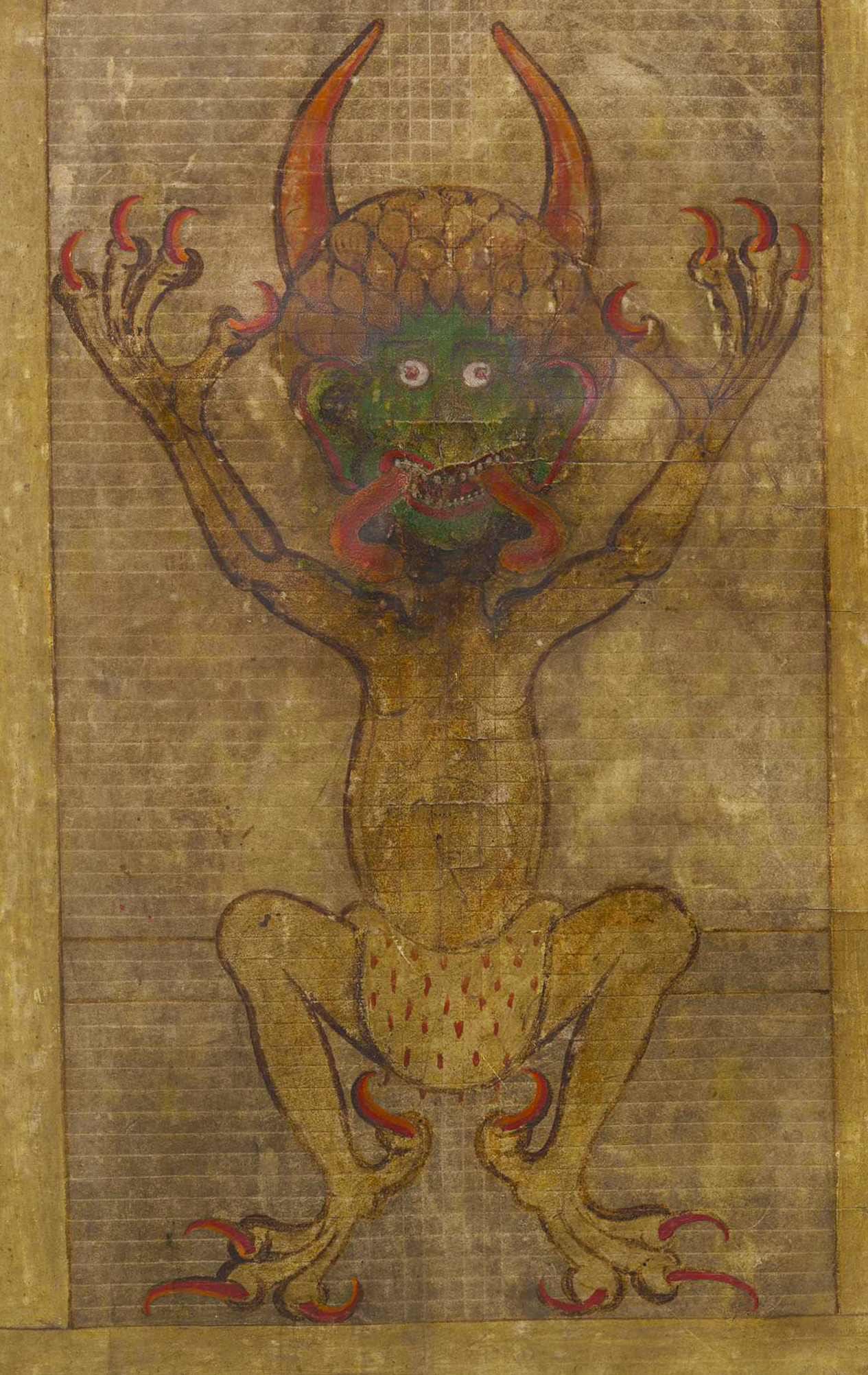
Depiction of the Devil in the Codex Gigas.

From the beginning of the early modern period (around the 1400s), Christians started to imagine the Devil as an increasingly powerful entity, constantly leading people into falsehood. Jews, witches, heretics and people affected by leprosy were often associated with the Devil. The Malleus Maleficarum, a popular and extensive work on witch-hunting, was written in 1486. Protestants and the Catholic Church began to accuse each other of teaching false doctrines and unwittingly falling for the traps of the Devil. Both Catholics and Protestants reformed Christian society by shifting their major ethical concerns from avoiding the seven deadly sins to observing the Ten Commandments. Thus disloyalty to God, which was seen as disloyalty to the church, and idolatry became the greatest sins, making the Devil increasingly dangerous. Some reform movements and early humanists often rejected the concept of a personal Devil. For example, Voltaire dismissed belief in the Devil as superstition.

==== Early Protestant thought ====
Martin Luther taught that the Devil was real, personal and powerful. Evil was not a deficit of good, but the presumptuous will against God, his word and his creation. He also affirmed the reality of witchcraft caused by the Devil. However, he denied the reality of witches' flight and metamorphoses, regarded as imagination instead. (Note: "However, the reformer rejects the reality of witches' flight or the transformation and metamorphosis of people into other forms and ascribed such ideas not to the devil, but to human imagination.") The Devil could also possess someone. He opined that the possessed might feel the Devil in himself, as a believer feels the Holy Spirit in his body. (Note: "The reformer thinks of the possession of the devil as a possibility and he feels how he fills the human body, similar to how he feels the divine spirit for himself and thus regards himself as an instrument of God.") In his Theatrum Diabolorum, Luther lists several hosts of greater and lesser devils. Greater devils would incite to greater sins, like unbelief and heresy, while lesser devils to minor sins like greed and fornication. Among these devils also appears Asmodeus known from the Book of Tobit. (Note: "The reformer interprets the book of Tobit as a drama in which Asmodeus is up to mischief as a house devil.") These anthropomorphic devils are used as stylistic devices for his audience, although Luther regards them as different manifestations of one spirit (i.e. the devil). (Note: "Thus Luther's use of individual specific devils is explained by the need to present his thoughts in a manner that is reasonable and understandable for the masses of his contemporaries.")

John Calvin taught the traditional view of the Devil as a fallen angel. Calvin repeats the simile of Saint Augustine: "Man is like a horse, with either God or the Devil as rider." In interrogation of Servetus who had said that all creation was part of God, Calvin asked: "what of the Devil?" Servetus responded that "all things are a part and portion of God".

Protestants regarded the teachings of the Catholic Church as undermined by Satan's agency, since they were seen as having replaced the teachings of the Bible with invented customs. Unlike heretics and witches, Protestants saw Catholics as following Satan unconsciously. By abandoning the ceremonial rituals and intercession upheld by the Catholic Church, reformers emphasized individual resistance against the temptations of the Devil. Among Luther's teachings to ward off the Devil was a recommendation of music since "the Devil cannot stand gaiety."

==== Anabaptists and Dissenters ====
David Joris was the first of the Anabaptists to suggest the Devil was only an allegory (c. 1540); this view found a small but persistent following in the Netherlands. The Devil as a fallen angel symbolized Adam's fall from God's grace and Satan represented a power within man.

Thomas Hobbes (1588–1679) used the Devil as a metaphor. The Devil, Satan and similar figures mentioned throughout the Bible, refer in his work Leviathan to offices or qualities but not individual beings.

However, these views remained very much a minority view at this time. Daniel Defoe in his The Political History of the Devil (1726) describes such views as a form of "practical atheism". Defoe wrote "those who believe there is a God, [...] acknowledge the debt of homage which mankind owes [...] to nature, and to believe the existence of the Devil is a like debt to reason".

=== In the Modern Era ===
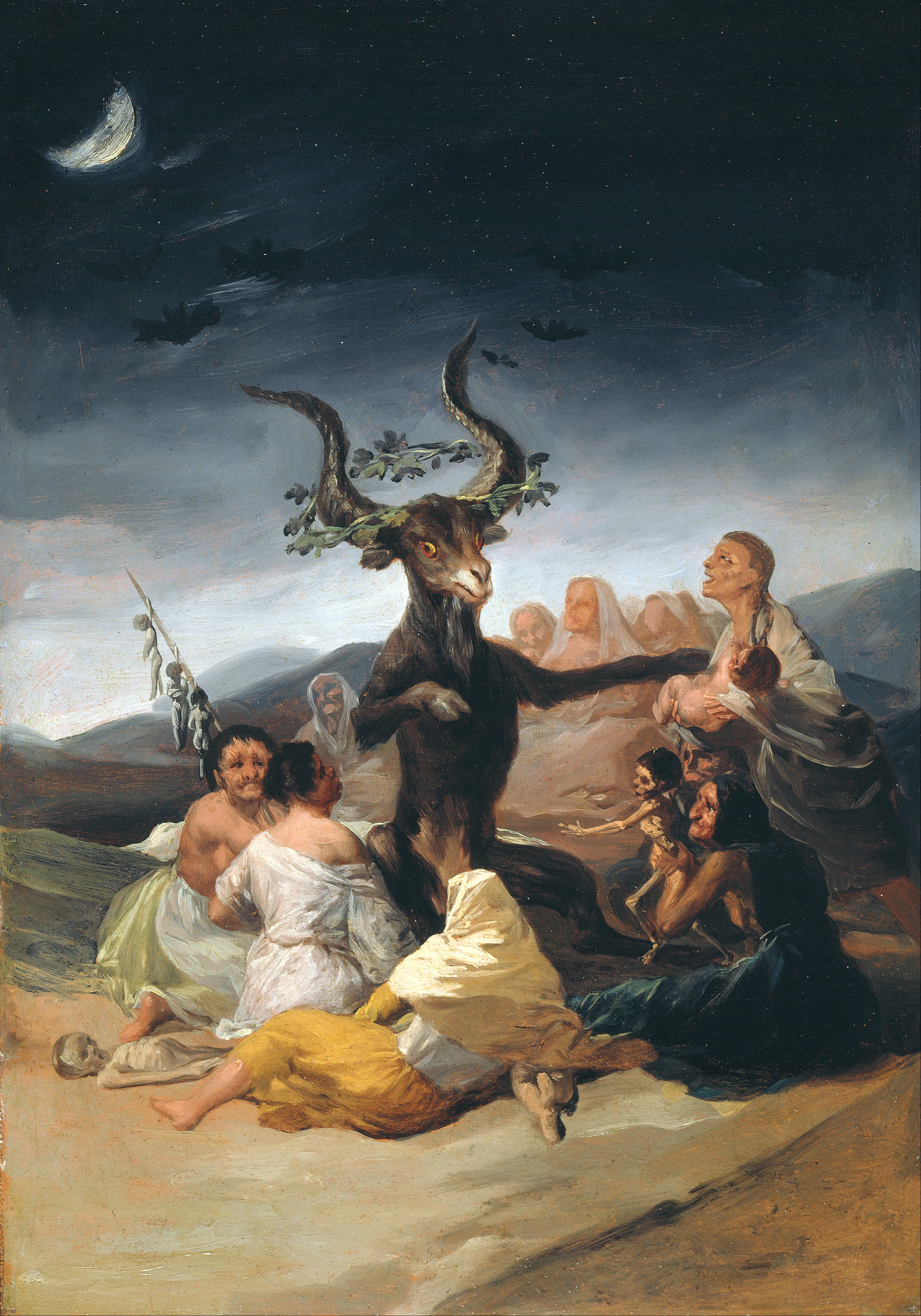
Witches' Sabbath (1798) by Francisco Goya, depicting the devil in the form of a garlanded goat.

With the increasing influence of positivism, scientism and nihilism in the modern era, both the concept of God and the Devil have become less relevant for many. However, Gallup has reported that "Regardless of political belief, religious inclination, education, or region, most Americans believe that the devil exists."

Many Christian theologians have interpreted the Devil as being within its original cultural context a symbol of psychological forces. Many dropped the concept of the Devil as an unnecessary assumption: they say that the Devil does not add much to solving the problem of evil since, whether or not the angels sinned before men, the question remains how evil entered the world in the first place.

Rudolf Bultmann taught that Christians need to reject belief in a literal Devil as part of formulating an authentic faith in today's world.

In contrast, the works of writers like Jeffrey Burton Russell retain the belief in a literal personal fallen being of some kind. Russell argues that theologians who reject a literal Devil (like Bultmann) overlook the fact that the Devil is part and parcel of the New Testament from its origins.

More recently, scholars such as Richard Raiswell, Michelle Brock and David Winter have argued that far from being vanquished by the forces of rationalism unleashed by the Enlightenment, the west has been undergoing something of a Satanic Renaissance. Led by American evangelicals and Christian nationalists, they see the devil as remerging as a powerful explanation for many of the social and cultural changes that have sparked outrage in conservative circles since the 1960s. Whitney Phillips and Mark Brockway have gone so far as to identify an “anti-liberal demonology” underlying much of the political right’s rhetoric. To these scholars, this renaissance is not just rhetorical. The Public Religion Research Institute reported in a 2025 survey that 22% Americans agreed or mostly agreed with the statement that “The government, media, and financial worlds in the U.S. are controlled by a group of Satan-worshipping paedophiles who run a global child sex trafficking operation.”

Christian theologian Karl Barth describes the Devil neither as a person nor as a merely psychological force but as nature opposing good. He includes the Devil in his threefold cosmology: there is God, God's creation, and nothingness. Nothingness is not absence of existence, but a plane of existence in which God withdraws his creative power. It is depicted as chaos opposing real being, distorting the structure of the cosmos and gaining influence over humanity. In contrast to dualism, Barth argued that opposition to reality entails reality, so that the existence of the Devil depends on the existence of God and is not an independent principle.

=== Contemporary views ===
==== Catholic Church ====
While the Catholic Church has not paid much attention to the Devil in the modern period, some contemporary Catholic teachings have begun to re-emphasize the Devil. (Note: "The success of fundamentalist groups on the fringes of the Catholic Church is just as much a part of the success story of the "resurrected" evil, as is its position in non-Catholic sects and free churches.")

Pope Paul VI expressed concern about the influence of the Devil in 1972, stating that: "Satan's smoke has made its way into the Temple of God through some crack". However, John Paul II viewed the defeat of Satan as inevitable.

Pope Francis brought renewed focus on the Devil in the early 2010s, stating, among many other pronouncements, that "The devil is intelligent, he knows more theology than all the theologians together." Journalist Cindy Wooden commented on the pervasiveness of the Devil in Pope Francis' teachings, noting that Francis believes that the Devil is real. During a morning homily in the chapel of the Domus Sanctae Marthae, in 2013, the pontiff said:

The Devil is not a myth, but a real person. One must react to the Devil, as did Jesus, who replied with the word of God. With the prince of this world one cannot dialogue. Dialogue is necessary among us, it is necessary for peace [...] Dialogue is born from charity, from love. But with that prince one cannot dialogue; one can only respond with the word of God that defends us.

In 2019, Arturo Sosa, superior general of the Society of Jesus, said that Satan is a symbol, the personification of evil, but not a person and not a "personal reality"; four months later, he said that the Devil is real, and his power is a malevolent force.

==== Unitarians and Christadelphians ====
Liberal Christianity often views the Devil metaphorically and figuratively. The Devil is seen as representing human sin and temptation, and any human system in opposition to God. Early Unitarians and Dissenters like Nathaniel Lardner, Richard Mead, Hugh Farmer, William Ashdowne and John Simpson, and John Epps taught that the miraculous healings of the Bible were real, but that the Devil was an allegory, and demons just the medical language of the day. Such views are taught today by Christadelphians and the Church of the Blessed Hope. Unitarians and Christadelphians who reject the Trinity, immortality of the soul and the divinity of Christ, also reject belief in a personified evil.

==== Charismatic movements ====
Charismatic movements regard the Devil as a personal and real character, rejecting the increasingly metaphorical and historical reinterpretation of the Devil in the modern period as unbiblical and contrary to the life of Jesus. People who surrender to the kingdom of the Devil are in danger of becoming possessed by his demons.

== By denomination ==
=== Catholicism ===
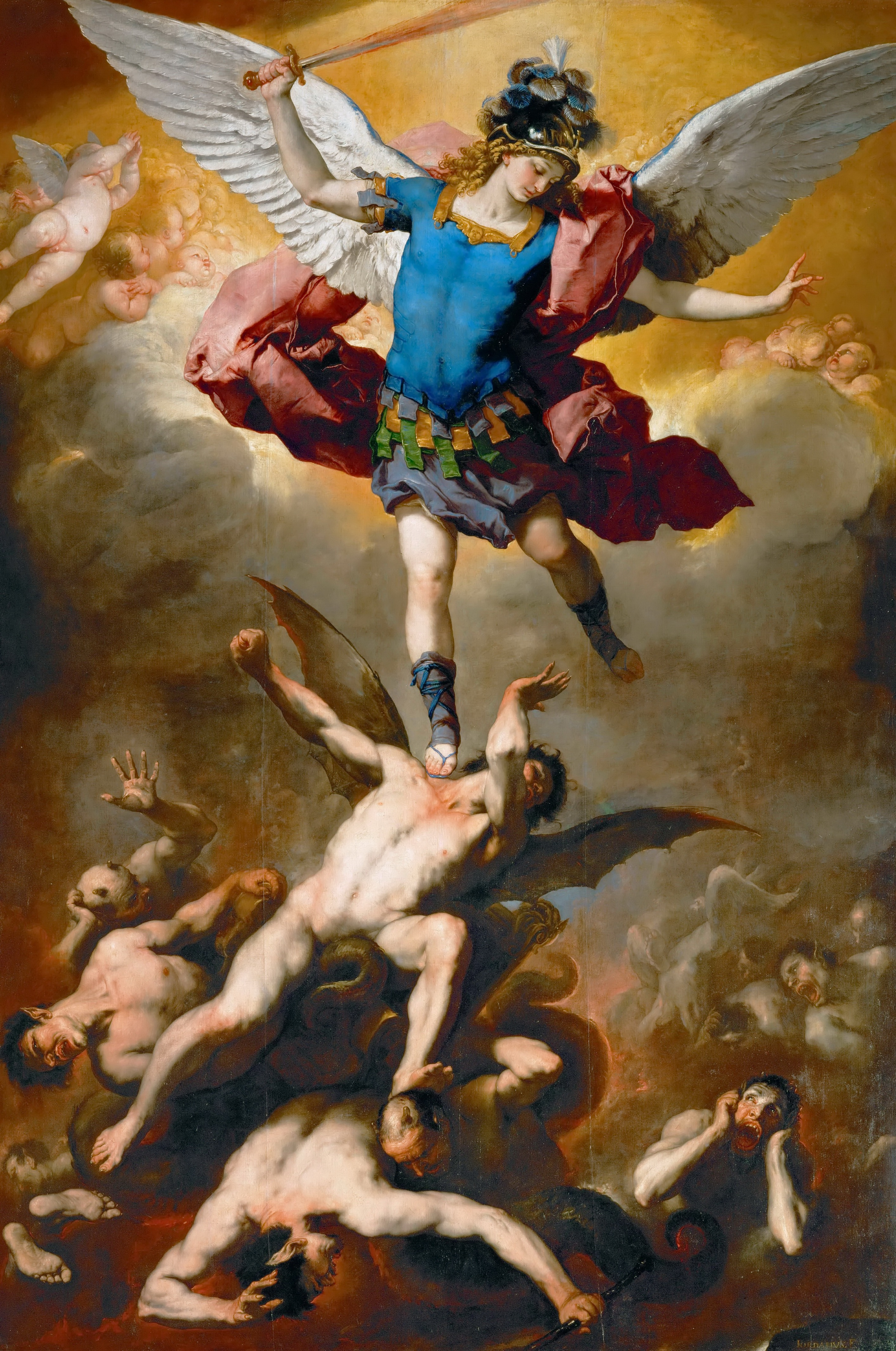
Luca Giordano's painting of Archangel Michael and Fallen Angels, Vienna, 1666

The Catechism of the Catholic Church states that the Church regards the Devil as being created as a good angel by God, and by his and his fellow fallen angels' free will, fell out of God's grace. Satan is not an infinitely powerful being. Although he is an angel, and thus pure spirit, he is considered a creature nonetheless. Satan's actions are permitted by divine providence. Catholicism rejects apocatastasis, the reconciliation with God suggested by the Church Father Origen.

A number of prayers and practices against the Devil exist within Catholic Church tradition. The Lord's Prayer includes a petition for being delivered "from the evil one", but a number of other specific prayers also exist.

The Prayer to Saint Michael specifically asks for Catholics to be defended "against the wickedness and snares of the Devil." Given that some of the messages from Our Lady of Fatima have been linked by the Holy See to the "end times", some Catholic authors have concluded that the angel referred to within the Fatima messages is Michael the Archangel, who defeats the Devil in the War in Heaven. Timothy Tindal-Robertson takes the position that the Consecration of Russia was a step in the eventual defeat of Satan by the Archangel Michael.

The process of exorcism is used within the Catholic Church against the Devil and demonic possession. According to the Catechism of the Catholic Church, "Jesus performed exorcisms and from him the Church has received the power and office of exorcising". Gabriele Amorth, who was until his death in 2016 the chief exorcist of the Diocese of Rome, warned against ignoring Satan, saying, "Whoever denies Satan also denies sin and no longer understands the actions of Christ".

The Catholic Church views the battle against the Devil as ongoing. During a 24 May 1987 visit to the Sanctuary of Saint Michael the Archangel, Pope John Paul II said:

The battle against the Devil, which is the principal task of Saint Michael the archangel, is still being fought today, because the Devil is still alive and active in the world. The evil that surrounds us today, the disorders that plague our society, man's inconsistency and brokenness, are not only the results of original sin, but also the result of Satan's pervasive and dark action.

=== Eastern Orthodox views ===
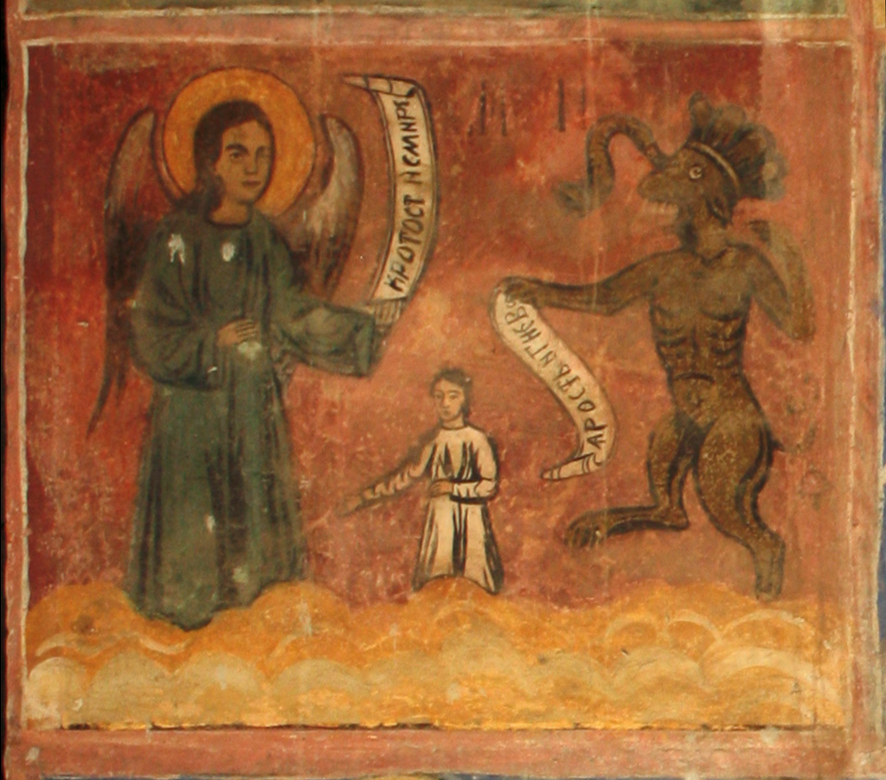
An angel with the virtues of temperance and humility and the Devil with the sins of rage and anger. A fresco from the 18th century in Saint Nicholas church in Cukovets, Pernik Province, Bulgaria

In Eastern Orthodoxy, the Devil is an integral part of Christian cosmology. The existence of the Devil is taken seriously and is not subject to question. According to Eastern Orthodox Christian tradition, there are three enemies of humanity: Death, sin and Satan. In contrast to Western Christianity, sin is not viewed as a deliberate choice but as a universal and inescapable weakness. Sin is turning from God towards oneself, a form of egoism and ungratefulness, leading away from God towards death and nothingness. Lucifer invented sin, resulting in death, and introduced it first to the angels, who have been created before the material world, and then to humanity. Lucifer, considered a former radiant archangel, lost his light after his fall and became the dark Satan (the enemy).

Eastern Orthodoxy maintains that God did not create death, but that it was forged by the Devil through deviance from the righteous way (a love of God and gratitude). In a sense, it was a place where God was not, for he could not die, yet it was an inescapable prison for all humanity until the Christ. Before Christ's resurrection, it could be said that humanity had a reason to fear the Devil, as he was a creature that could separate mankind from God and source of life — for God could not enter hell, and humanity could not escape it.

Once in Hades, the Orthodox hold that Christ — being good and just — granted life and resurrection to all who wanted to follow him. As a result, the Devil has been overthrown and is no longer able to hold humanity. With the prison despoiled, the Devil only has power over those who freely choose him and sin.

=== Evangelical Protestants ===
Evangelical Protestants agree that Satan is a real, created being entirely given over to evil and that evil is whatever opposes God or is not willed by God. Evangelicals emphasize the power and involvement of Satan in history in varying degrees; some virtually ignore Satan and others revel in speculation about spiritual warfare against that personal power of darkness. According to Soergel, Martin Luther avoided "an extensive treatment of the angels' place in heavenly hierarchy or in Christian theology." Modern Protestants continue in a similar way, since it is thought as neither useful nor necessary to know.

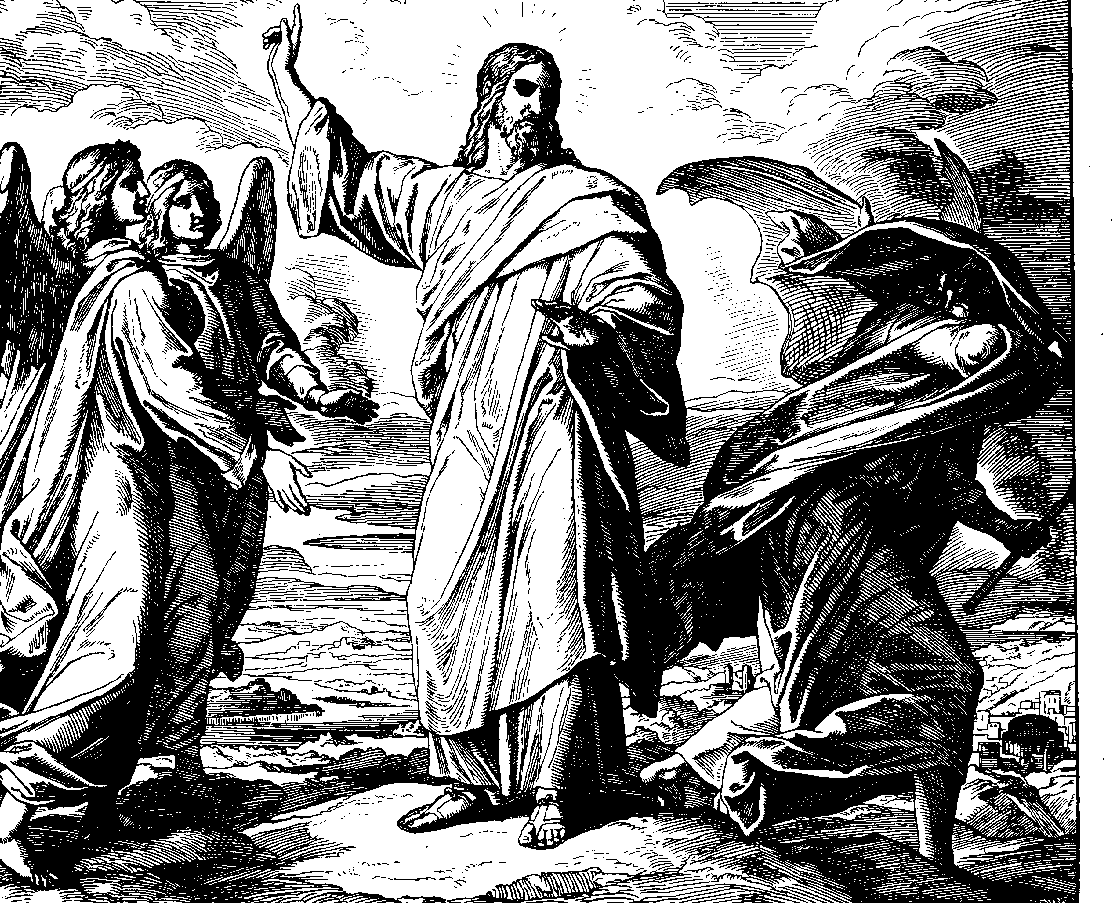
Jesus commands Satan to go away; 1860 woodcut by Julius Schnorr von Karolsfeld depicting the Temptation of Christ.

=== Jehovah's Witnesses ===
Jehovah's Witnesses believe that Satan was originally a perfect angel who developed feelings of self-importance and craved worship that belonged to God. Satan persuaded Adam and Eve to obey him rather than God, raising the issue—often referred to as a "controversy"—of whether people, having been granted free will, would obey God under both temptation and persecution. The issue is said to be whether God can rightfully claim to be sovereign of the universe. Instead of destroying Satan, God decided to test the loyalty of the rest of humankind and to prove to the rest of creation that Satan was a liar. Jehovah's Witnesses believe that Satan is God's chief adversary and the invisible ruler of the world. They believe that demons were originally angels who rebelled against God and took Satan's side in the controversy.

Jehovah's Witnesses do not believe that Satan lives in Hell or that he has been given responsibility to punish the wicked. Satan and his demons are said to have been cast down from Heaven to Earth in 1914, marking the beginning of the "last days". Witnesses believe that Satan and his demons influence individuals, organizations and nations, and that they are the cause of human suffering. At Armageddon, Satan is to be bound for 1,000 years, and then given a brief opportunity to mislead perfect humanity before being destroyed.

=== Latter Day Saints ===
In Mormonism, the Devil is a real being, a literal spirit son of God who once had angelic authority, but rebelled and fell prior to the creation of the Earth in a pre-mortal life. At that time, he persuaded a third part of the spirit children of God to rebel with him. This was in opposition to the plan of salvation championed by Jehovah (Jesus Christ). Now the Devil tries to persuade mankind into doing evil (Doctrine and Covenants 76:24–29). Mankind can overcome this through faith in Jesus Christ and obedience to the Gospel.

Latter-Day Saints traditionally regard Lucifer as the pre-mortal name of the Devil. Mormon theology teaches that in a heavenly council, Lucifer rebelled against the plan of God the Father and was subsequently cast out. Mormon scripture reads:

And this we saw also, and bear record, that an angel of God who was in authority in the presence of God, who rebelled against the Only Begotten Son whom the Father loved and who was in the bosom of the Father, was thrust down from the presence of God and the Son, and was called Perdition, for the heavens wept over him—he was Lucifer, a son of the morning. And we beheld, and lo, he is fallen! is fallen, even a son of the morning! And while we were yet in the Spirit, the Lord commanded us that we should write the vision; for we beheld Satan, that Old Serpent, even the devil, who rebelled against God, and sought to take the kingdom of our God and his Christ—Wherefore, he maketh war with the saints of God, and encompasseth them round about (Doctrine and Covenants 76:25–29)

After becoming Satan by his fall, Lucifer "goeth up and down, to and fro in the earth, seeking to destroy the souls of men" (Doctrine and Covenants 10:27). Mormons consider Isaiah 14:12 to be referring to both the king of the Babylonians and the Devil.

== Theological disputes ==
=== Angelic hierarchy ===
The Devil might either be a cherub or a seraph. Christian writers were often undecided from which order of the angels the Devil fell. While the Devil is identified with the cherub in Ezekiel 28:13–15, this conflicts with the view that the Devil was among the highest angels, who are, according to Pseudo-Dionysius, the seraphim. Thomas Aquinas quotes Gregory the Great who stated that Satan "surpassed [the angels] all in glory". Arguing that the higher an angel stood the more likely he was to become guilty of pride, the Devil would be a seraph. But Aquinas held sin incompatible with the fiery love characteristic of a seraph, but possible for a cherub, whose primary characteristic is fallible knowledge. He concludes, in line with Ezekiel, that the Devil was the most knowledgeable of the angels, a cherub.

=== Hell ===
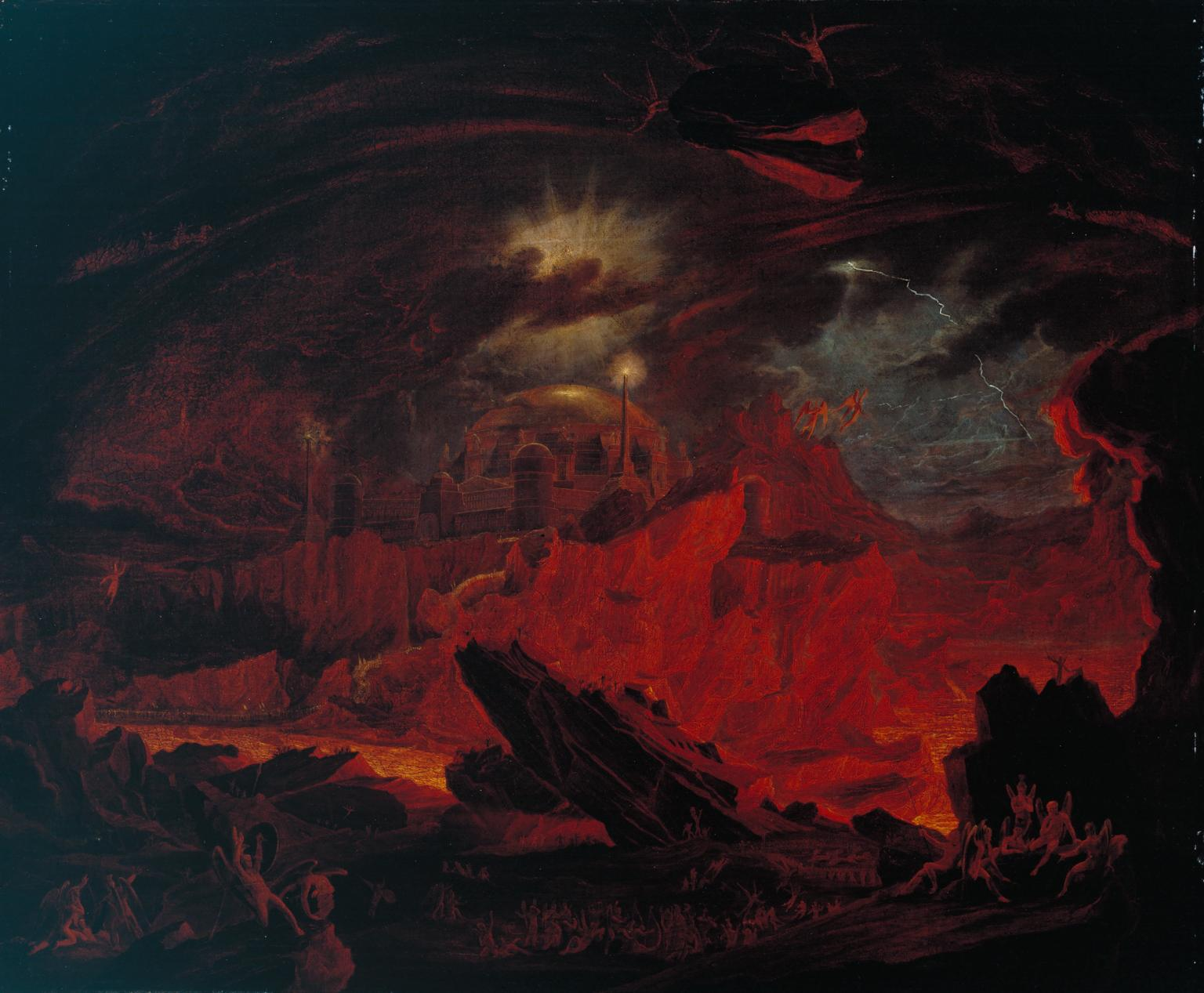
"Fallen Angels in Hell", painting by John Martin

Christianity is undecided whether the Devil fell immediately into hell or if he is given respite until the Day of Judgment. Several Christian authors, among them Dante Alighieri and John Milton, have depicted the Devil as resident in Hell. This is in contrast to parts of the Bible that describe the Devil as traveling about the earth, like Job 1:6–7 and 1 Peter 5:8, discussed above. On the other hand, 2 Peter 2:4 speaks of sinning angels chained in hell. At least according to Revelation 20:10, the Devil is thrown into the Lake of Fire and Sulfur. Theologians disagree whether the Devil roams the air of the earth or fell underground into hell, yet both views agree that the Devil will be in hell after Judgment Day.

If the Devil is bound in hell, the question arises how he can still appear to people on earth. In some literature, the Devil only sends his lesser demons or Satan to execute his will, while he remains chained in hell. Others assert that the Devil is chained but takes his chains with him when he rises to the surface of the earth. Gregory the Great tried to resolve this conflict by stating that, no matter where the Devil dwells spatially, separation from God itself is a state of hell. Bede states in his Commentary on the Epistle of James (3.6), no matter where the Devil and his angels move, they carry the tormenting flames of hell with them, like a person with fever.

=== Sinfulness of angels ===
Some theologians believe that angels cannot sin because sin brings death and angels cannot die.

Supporting the idea that an angel may sin, Thomas Aquinas, in his Summa Theologiae Question 63 article 1, wrote:

An angel or any other rational creature considered in his own nature, can sin; and to whatever creature it belongs not to sin, such creature has it as a gift of grace, and not from the condition of nature. The reason of this is, because sinning is nothing else than a deviation from that rectitude which an act ought to have; whether we speak of sin in nature, art, or morals. That act alone, the rule of which is the very virtue of the agent, can never fall short of rectitude. Were the craftsman's hand the rule itself engraving, he could not engrave the wood otherwise than rightly; but if the rightness of engraving be judged by another rule, then the engraving may be right or faulty.

He further divides angelic orders, as distinguished by Pseudo-Dionysius, into fallible and infallible based whether the Bible mentions them in relation to the demonic or not. He concludes that because seraphim (the highest order) and thrones (the third-highest) are never mentioned as devils, they are unable to sin. On the contrary, the Bible speaks about cherubim (the second-highest order) and powers (the sixth-highest) in relation to the Devil. He concludes that attributes represented by the infallible angels, like charity, can only be good, while attributes represented by cherubim and powers can be both good and bad.

Aquinas concludes that while angels cannot succumb to bodily desires, as intellectual creatures they can sin as result of their mind-based will. The sins attributed to the Devil include pride, envy, and even lust, for Lucifer loved himself more than everything else. Initially, after the angels realized their existence, they decided for or against dependence on God, and the good and evil angels were separated from each other after a short delay following their creation. Similarly, Peter Lombard writes in his Sentences, angels were all created as good spirits, had a short interval of free-decision and some choose love and have thus been rewarded with grace by God, while others choose sin (pride or envy) and became demons.

== Iconography and literature ==
=== Images ===
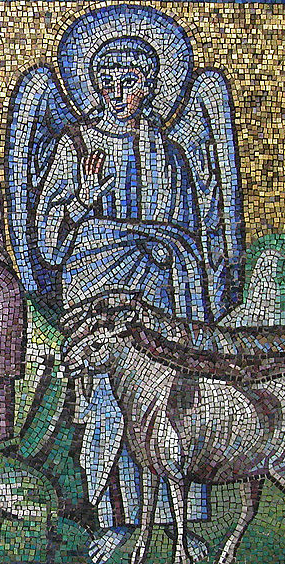
Excerpt of a Byzantine-Mosaic-Image. A blue angel, probably representing the Devil, standing before goats. Early 6th century.

The earliest representation of the Devil might be a mosaic in Basilica of Sant'Apollinare Nuovo in Ravenna from the 6th century, in the form of a blue angel. Blue and violet were common colors for the Devil in the early Middle Ages, reflecting his body composed of the air below the heavens, considered to consist of thicker material than the ethereal fire of heavens the good angels are made from and thus colored red. The Devil's first appearance as black rather than blue was in the 9th century. Only later did the Devil became associated with the color red to reflect blood or the fires of hell.

Before the 11th century, the Devil was often shown in art as either a human or a black imp. The humanoid Devil often wore white robes and feathered bird-like wings or appeared as an old man in a tunic. The imps were depicted as tiny misshapen creatures. When humanoid features were combined with monstrous ones during the 11th century, the imp's monstrosity gradually developed into the grotesque. Horns became a common motif starting in the 11th century. The Devil was often depicted as naked wearing only loincloths, symbolizing sexuality and wildness.

Particularly in the medieval period, the Devil was often shown as having horns and a goat's hindquarters and with a tail. He was also depicted as carrying a pitchfork, the implement used in Hell to torment the damned, which derives in part from the trident of Poseidon. Goat-like images resemble the Ancient Greek Deity Pan. Pan in particular looks very much like the European Devil in the late Middle Ages. It is unknown if these features are directly taken from Pan or whether Christians coincidentally devised an image similar to Pan. Depiction of the Devil as a satyr-like creature is attested since the 11th century.

=== Dante's Inferno ===
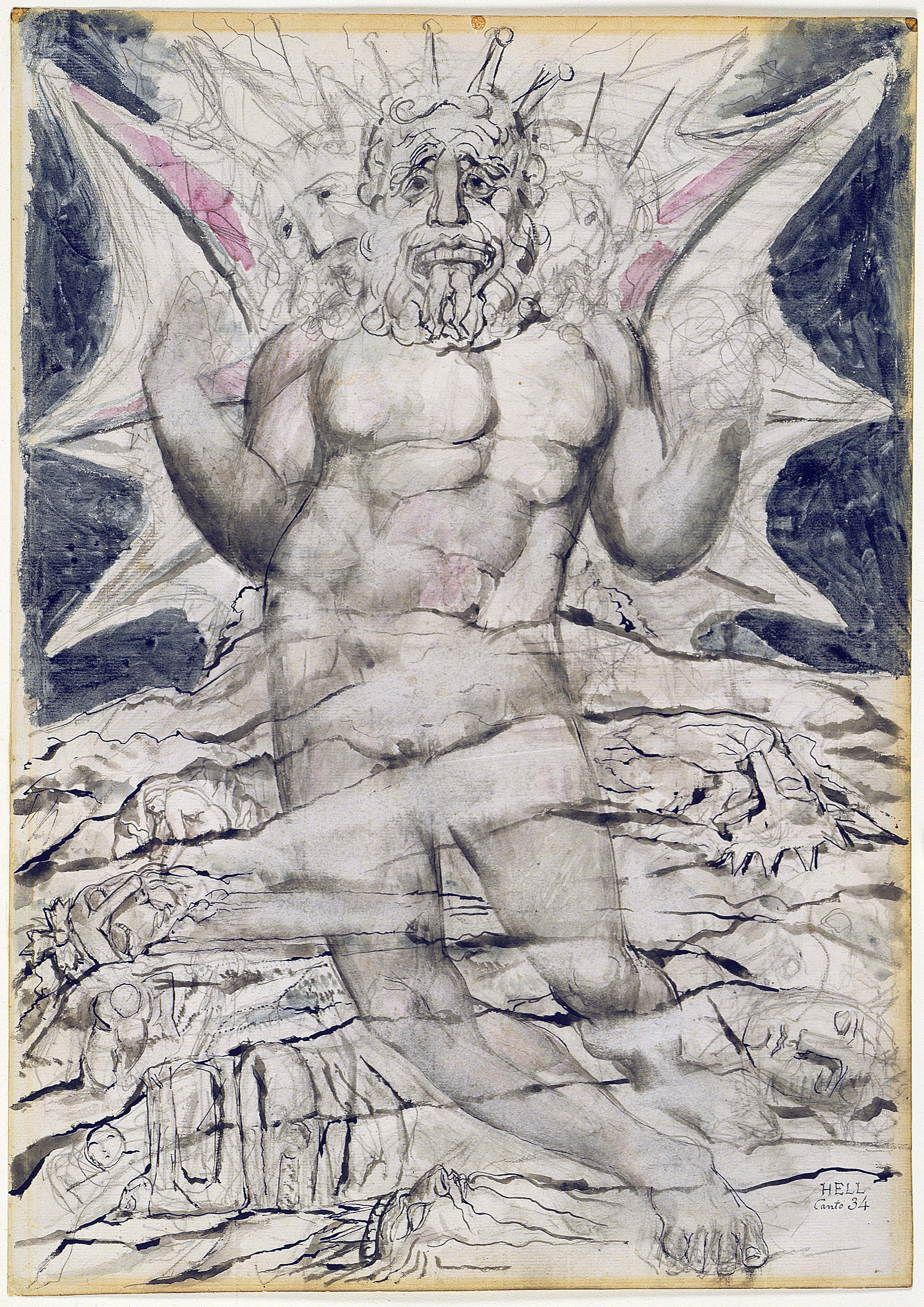
Illustrations to Dante's Divine Comedy, object 72 Butlin 812–69 recto Lucifer

The portrayal of the Devil in Dante Alighieri's Inferno reflects early Christian Neo-Platonic thought. Dante structures his cosmology morally; God is beyond heaven and the Devil at the bottom of hell beneath the earth. Imprisoned in the middle of the earth, the Devil becomes the center of the material and sinful world to which all sinfulness is drawn. In opposition to God, who is portrayed by Dante as a love and light, Lucifer is frozen and isolated in the last circle of hell. Almost motionless, more pathetic, foolish, and repulsive than terrifying, the Devil represents evil in the sense of lacking substance. In accordance with Platonic/Christian tradition, his gigantic appearance indicates a lack of power, as pure matter was considered the farthest from God and closest to non-being.

The Devil is described as a huge fiend, whose buttocks are frozen in ice. He has three faces, chewing on the three traitors Judas, Cassius and Brutus. Lucifer himself is also accused of treason for turning against his Creator. Below each of his faces, Lucifer has a pair of bat-wings, another symbol of darkness.

=== John Milton in Paradise Lost ===
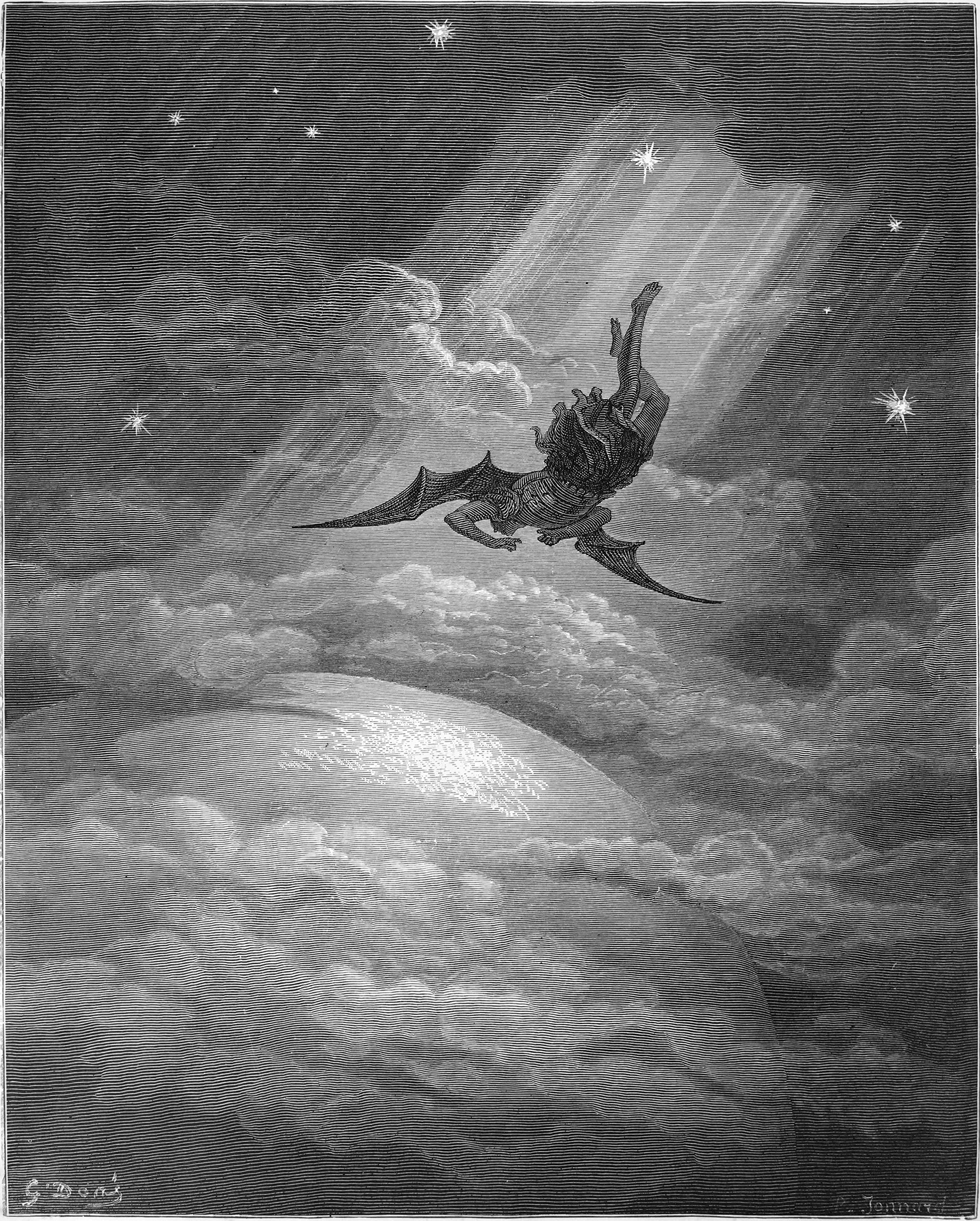
Illustration for John Milton's "Paradise Lost", depicting the "Fall of Lucifer"

In John Milton's Renaissance epic poem Paradise Lost, Satan is one of the main characters, perhaps an anti-hero. In line with Christian theology, Satan rebelled against God and was subsequently banished from heaven along with his fellow angels. Milton breaks with previous authors who portray Satan as a grotesque figure; instead, he becomes a persuasive and charismatic leader who, even in hell, convinced the other fallen angels to establish their own kingdom. It is unclear whether Satan is a hero turning against an unjust ruler (God) or a fool who leads himself and his followers into damnation in a futile attempt to become equal to God. Milton uses several pagan images to depict the demons, and Satan himself arguably resembles the ancient legendary hero Aeneas. Satan is less the Devil as known from Christian theology than a morally ambivalent character with strengths and weaknesses, inspired by the Christian Devil.

== See also ==
- Devil in popular culture
- Angra Mainyu
- Chernobog and Belobog
- Dystheism
- Evil demon
- Exorcism in Christianity
- Iblis
- Misotheism
- Mara (demon)
- Prayer to Saint Michael
- Spirit world
- The Devil's Farmhouse

== Sources ==
- Bainton, Roland H. (2013). Here I Stand: A Life of Martin Luther. Abingdon Press. ISBN 978-1-4267-7596-3.
- Barnstone, Willis; Meyer, Marvin (2009). The Gnostic Bible: Revised and Expanded Edition. Shambhala Publications. ISBN 978-0-8348-2414-0.
- Bonnetain, Yvonne S (2015). Loki: Beweger der Geschichten [Loki: Movers of the stories] (in German). Roter Drache. ISBN 978-3-939459-68-2. OCLC 935942344.
- Boureau, Alain (2006). Satan the Heretic: The Birth of Demonology in the Medieval West. University of Chicago Press. ISBN 978-0-226-06748-3.
- Boustan, Ra'anan S.; Reed, Annette Yoshiko (2004). Heavenly Realms and Earthly Realities in Late Antique Religions. Cambridge University Press. ISBN 978-1-139-45398-1.
- Bradnick, David L. (2017). Evil, Spirits, and Possession: An Emergentist Theology of the Demonic. BRILL. ISBN 978-90-04-35061-8.
- Brüggemann, Romy (2010). Die Angst vor dem Bösen: Codierungen des malum in der spätmittelalterlichen und frühneuzeitlichen Narren-, Teufel- und Teufelsbündnerliteratur [The fear of evil: Coding of the malum in the late medieval and early modern literature of fools, devils and allies of the devil] (in German). Königshausen & Neumann. ISBN 978-3-8260-4245-4.
- Bryson, Michael (2004). The Tyranny of Heaven: Milton's Rejection of God as King. University of Delaware Press. ISBN 978-0-87413-859-7.
- Bultmann, Rudolf Karl (1955). Theology of the New Testament. Vol. 2. SCM Press. ISBN 978-0-334-01622-9.
- Campo, Juan Eduardo (2009). Encyclopedia of Islam. Facts On File. ISBN 978-1-438-12696-8.
- Carus, Paul (1899). The History of the Devil and the Idea of Evil: From the Earliest Times to the Present Day. Open Court Publishing Company. ISBN 978-0-524-04637-1.
- Coogan, Michael David (2009). A Brief Introduction to the Old Testament: The Hebrew Bible in Its Context. Oxford University Press. ISBN 978-0-19-533272-8.
- Costen, M. D. (1997). The Cathars and the Albigensian Crusade. Manchester University Press. ISBN 978-0-7190-4332-1.
- Cottret, Bernard (2003). Calvin, A Biography. A&C Black. ISBN 978-0-567-53035-6.
- Cuneo, Michael W. (1999). The Smoke of Satan: Conservative and Traditionalist Dissent in Contemporary American Catholicism. JHU Press. ISBN 978-0-8018-6265-6.
- Davidson, Clifford; Seiler, Thomas H. (1992). The Iconography of Hell. Medieval Institute Publications, Western Michigan University. ISBN 978-1-879288-01-0.
- Defoe, Daniel (2016). The Political History of the Devil. Courier Dover Publications. ISBN 978-0-486-80237-4.
- Dendle, Peter (2001). Satan Unbound: The Devil in Old English Narrative Literature. University of Toronto Press. ISBN 978-0-8020-8369-2.
- Elm, Eva; Hartmann, Nicole (2020). Demons in Late Antiquity: Their Perception and Transformation in Different Literary Genres. Walter de Gruyter GmbH & Co KG. ISBN 978-3-11-063062-6.
- Farrar, Thomas J. (2014). "Satan in early Gentile Christian communities: An exegetical study in Mark and 2 Corinthians" (PDF). dianoigo.
- Farrar, Thomas J. (2019). "New Testament Satanology and Leading Suprahuman Opponents in Second Temple Jewish Literature: A Religio-Historical Analysis". The Journal of Theological Studies. 70 (1): 21–68. doi:10.1093/jts/fly165.
- Esler, Philip Francis (2000). The Early Christian World. Taylor & Francis. ISBN 978-0-415-16497-9.
- Flinn, Frank K. (2007). Encyclopedia of Catholicism. Infobase Publishing. ISBN 978-0-8160-7565-2.
- Forsyth, Neil (1989). The Old Enemy: Satan and the Combat Myth. Princeton University Press. ISBN 978-0-691-01474-6.
- Frick, Karl R. H. (2006). Satan und die Satanisten: Satanismus und Freimaurerei - ihre Geschichte bis zur Gegenwart: Das Reich Satans [Satan and the Satanists: Satanism and Freemasonry - Their History to the Present: The Kingdom of Satan] (in German). Vol. 1. Marixverl. ISBN 978-3-86539-069-1.
- Geddes, Gordon; Griffiths, Jane (2002). Christian Belief and Practice: The Roman Catholic Tradition. Heinemann. ISBN 978-0-435-30691-5.
- Geisenhanslüke, Achim; Mein, Georg; Overthun, Rasmus (2015) [2009]. Geisenhanslüke, Achim; Mein, Georg (eds.). Monströse Ordnungen: Zur Typologie und Ästhetik des Anormalen [Monstrous Orders: On the Typology and Aesthetics of the Abnormal]. Literalität und Liminalität (in German). Vol. 12. Bielefeld: Transcript Verlag. doi:10.1515/9783839412572. ISBN 978-3-8394-1257-2.
- Gibson, Jeffrey (2004). Temptations of Jesus in Early Christianity (reprint ed.). A&C Black. ISBN 978-0-567-08336-4.
- Grant, Robert M. (2006). Irenaeus of Lyons. Routledge. ISBN 978-1-134-81518-0.
- Goetz, Hans-Werner (2016). Gott und die Welt. Religiöse Vorstellungen des frühen und hohen Mittelalters. Teil I, Band 3: IV. Die Geschöpfe: Engel, Teufel, Menschen [God and the world. Religious Concepts of the Early and High Middle Ages. Part I, Volume 3: IV. The Creatures: Angels, Devils, Humans] (in German). Vandenhoeck & Ruprecht. ISBN 978-3-8470-0581-0.
- Goulder, Michael D. (1998). The Psalms of the Return (Book V, Psalms 107-150): Studies in the Psalter, IV. A&C Black. ISBN 978-0-567-38896-4.
- Holden, Andrew (2012). Jehovah's Witnesses Portrait of a Contemporary Religious Movement. Taylor & Francis. ISBN 978-1-134-50151-9.
- Hoffmann, Tobias (2020). Free Will and the Rebel Angels in Medieval Philosophy. Cambridge University Press. ISBN 978-1-108-91632-5.
- Holsinger-Friesen, Thomas (2009). Irenaeus and Genesis: A Study of Competition in Early Christian Hermeneutics. Penn State Press. ISBN 978-1-57506-630-1.
- Hooks, Stephen M. (2006). Job. College Press. ISBN 978-0-89900-886-8.
- Horn, Christoph (2010). Augustinus, De civitate dei [Augustine, On the City of God] (in German). Oldenbourg Verlag. ISBN 978-3-05-005040-9.
- Houtman, Alberdina; Kadari, Tamar; Poorthuis, Marcel; Tohar, Vered (2016). Religious Stories in Transformation: Conflict, Revision and Reception. BRILL. ISBN 978-90-04-33481-6.
- Lambert, Malcolm D. (1998). The Cathars. Wiley. ISBN 978-0-631-20959-1.
- Kelly, Henry Ansgar (2004). The Devil, demonology, and witchcraft: the development of Christian beliefs in evil spirits. Wipf and Stock Publishers. ISBN 978-1-59244-531-8. OCLC 56727898.
- Kelly, Henry Ansgar (2006). Satan: A Biography. Cambridge University Press. ISBN 978-0-521-84339-3.
- Kolb, Robert; Dingel, Irene; Batka, Lubomir, eds. (2014). The Oxford Handbook of Martin Luther's Theology. Oxford University Press. ISBN 978-0-19-960470-8.
- Koskenniemi, Erkki; Fröhlich, Ida (2013). Evil and the Devil. A&C Black. ISBN 978-0-567-60738-6.
- Leimgruber, Ute (2004). Kein Abschied vom Teufel: Eine Untersuchung zur gegenwärtigen Rede vom Teufel im Volk Gottes [No Farewell to the Devil: An Inquiry into the Present Discussion of the Devil in God's People] (in German). Münster: LIT Verlag. ISBN 978-3-8258-7197-0. OCLC 723386359.
- Litwa, M. David (2016). Desiring Divinity: Self-deification in Early Jewish and Christian Mythmaking. Oxford University Press. ISBN 978-0-19-046717-3.
- Logan, A. H. B. (1996). Gnostic Truth and Christian Heresy: A Study in the History of Gnosticism. A&C Black. ISBN 978-0-567-09733-0.
- Miller, Stephen (2019). The Book of Angels: Seen and Unseen. Cambridge Scholars Publishing. ISBN 978-1-5275-3543-5.
- Müller, Jörn (2009). Willensschwäche in Antike und Mittelalter: Eine Problemgeschichte von Sokrates bis Johannes Duns Scotus [Weak wills in Antiquity and the Middle Ages: A Problem Story from Socrates to Johannes Duns Scotus] (in German). Leuven University Press. ISBN 978-94-6166-026-8.
- Murdoch, Brian (2003). The Medieval Popular Bible: Expansions of Genesis in the Middle Ages. DS Brewer. ISBN 978-0-85991-776-6.
- Nash, John F. (2008). Christianity: the One, the Many: What Christianity Might Have Been and Could Still Become Volume 1. Xlibris Corporation. ISBN 978-1-4628-2571-4.
- Oberman, Heiko Augustinus (2006). Luther: Man Between God and the Devil. Yale University Press. ISBN 978-0-300-10313-7.
- Parker, Thomas Henry Louis (1995). Calvin: An Introduction to His Thought. Westminster John Knox Press. ISBN 978-0-664-25602-9.
- Patmore, Hector M. (2012). Adam, Satan, and the King of Tyre: The Interpretation of Ezekiel 28:11-19 in Late Antiquity. BRILL. ISBN 978-90-04-20722-6.
- Phillips, Whitney and Mark Brockway (2025),The Shadow Gospel: How Anti-Liberal Demonology Possessed U.S. Religion, Media and Politics. Cambrdige Mass: MIT Press.
- Raymond, Joad (2010). Milton's Angels: The Early-Modern Imagination. OUP Oxford. ISBN 978-0-19-956050-9.
- Orlov, Andrei A. (2011). Dark Mirrors: Azazel and Satanael in Early Jewish Demonology. SUNY Press. ISBN 978-1-4384-3953-2.
- Orlov, Andrei A. (2013). Heavenly Priesthood in the Apocalypse of Abraham. Cambridge University Press. ISBN 978-1-107-47099-6.
- Peters, F. E. (2009). The Monotheists: Jews, Christians, and Muslims in Conflict and Competition, Volume I: The Peoples of God. Princeton University Press. ISBN 978-1-4008-2570-7.
- Petrisko, Thomas W. (1998). The Fatima Prophecies: At the Doorstep of the World. St. Andrews Productions. ISBN 978-1-891903-30-4.
- Petrisko, Thomas W. (2001). Fatima's Third Secret Explained. St. Andrews Productions. ISBN 978-1-891903-26-7.
- Raiswell, Richard, Michelle Brock and David Winter (2025), The Routledge History of the Devil in the Western Tradition. London: Routledge. ISBN 978-0-367-56142-0.
- Rudwin, Maximilian Josef (1970). The devil in legend and literature. Open Court Pub Co. ISBN 978-0-87548-248-4.
- Russell, Jeffrey Burton (1986). Lucifer: The Devil in the Middle Ages. Cornell University Press. ISBN 978-0-8014-9429-1.
- Russell, Jeffrey Burton (1987). Satan: The Early Christian Tradition. Cornell University Press. ISBN 978-0-8014-9413-0.
- Russell, Jeffrey Burton (1990). Mephistopheles: The Devil in the Modern World. Cornell University Press. ISBN 978-0-8014-9718-6.
- Russell, Jeffrey Burton (2000). Biographie des Teufels: das radikal Böse und die Macht des Guten in der Welt [Biography of the devil: the radical evil and the power of good in the world] (in German). Böhlau Verlag Wien. ISBN 978-3-205-99131-1.
- Schreckenberg, Heinz; Schubert, Kurt (1992). Jewish Historiography and Iconography in Early and Medieval Christianity. Augsburg Fortress, Publishers. ISBN 978-0-8006-2519-1.
- Stuckenbruck, Loren T.; Boccaccini, Gabriele (2016). Enoch and the Synoptic Gospels: Reminiscences, Allusions, Intertextuality. SBL Press. ISBN 978-0-88414-118-1.
- Theißen, Gerd (2009). Erleben und Verhalten der ersten Christen: Eine Psychologie des Urchristentums [Experience and Behavior of the First Christians: A Psychology of Early Christianity] (in German). Gütersloher Verlagshaus. ISBN 978-3-641-02817-6.
- Theobald, Florian (2015). Teufel, Tod und Trauer: Der Satan im Johannesevangelium und seine Vorgeschichte [Devil, death and mourning: Satan in the Gospel of John and his prehistory] (in German). Vandenhoeck & Ruprecht. ISBN 978-3-647-59367-8.
- Tindal-Robertson, Timothy (1998). Fatima, Russia and Pope John Paul II: How Mary Intervened to Deliver Russia from Marxist Atheism May 13, 1981 – December 25, 1991. Gracewing Publishing. ISBN 978-0-85244-384-2.
- Tyneh, Carl S. (2003). Orthodox Christianity: Overview and Bibliography. Nova Publishers. ISBN 978-1-59033-466-9.
- Tzamalikos, Panayiotis (2007). Origen: Philosophy of History & Eschatology. BRILL. ISBN 978-90-474-2869-5.
- Utley, Francis Lee (1945). "The Bible of the Folk". California Folklore Quarterly. 4 (1): 1–17. doi:10.2307/1495452. JSTOR 1495452.
- Wink, Walter (1984). Naming the Powers: The Language of Power in the New Testament. Fortress Press. ISBN 978-1-4514-1997-9.
