= Joe Ashdown =

Australian rules footballer

Personal information
- Full name: Joseph Charles Ashdown
- Born: 30 December 1922; Toorak, Victoria
- Died: 29 August 1982 (aged 59); Cranbourne, Victoria
- Original team: Glen Iris
- Height: 180 cm (5 ft 11 in)
- Weight: 80 kg (176 lb)

Playing career^{1}
Years	Club	Games (Goals)
1946	St Kilda	1 (0)
- ^{1} Playing statistics correct to the end of 1946.

Joseph Charles Ashdown (30 December 1922 – 29 August 1982) was an Australian rules footballer who played with St Kilda in the Victorian Football League (VFL).

== Family ==
The son of Joseph Henry Ashdown (1891-1969), and Rebecca Ashdown (1886-1966), née Wakeling, Joseph Charles Ashdown was born at Toorak, Victoria on 30 December 1922.

He married Noreen Alice Kennedy in 1945. Together they had two children, a son Wayne Joseph Ashdown born 31 January 1951 and Janus Ashdown.

== Military service ==
Ashdown served as a leading aircraftman in the Royal Australian Air Force during the Second World War from December 1941 until April 1946.

== Death ==
He died at Amstel golf course Cranbourne, Victoria on 29 August 1982.
