= Ashdown House =

Ashdown House may refer to:

- Ashdown House, East Sussex, an 18th-century country house in Forest Row, England, now a school
- Ashdown House, Oxfordshire, a 17th-century country house in Ashbury, England, belonging to the National Trust
- Ashdown House, a graduate residential house at the Massachusetts Institute of Technology in Cambridge, Massachusetts, United States
