= William Ashdowne =

William Ashdowne (1723–1810) was an English Unitarian preacher.

== Life ==
As a probationer for the ministry, William Ashdowne went to Dover, then following the death of his father-in-law became minister in the (Unitarian) General Baptist denomination at Mount Ephraim, Tunbridge Wells, Kent. He was an active contributor to several magazines, but not always accepted for publication, as in 1786, an article on baptism by the editor of the Repository.

He was a friend and correspondent of Joseph Priestley.

== Works ==
He wrote several religious booklets including one arguing for an allegorical reading of the New Testament devil passages: An attempt to shew that the opinion concerning the devil or satan, as a fallen angel, and that he tempts men to sin, hath no real foundation in scripture. Ashdowne acknowledged continuity with

'The Notions concerning Dæmons, about our Saviour’s time, have been collected, from the best authorities, by Dr Lardner, in his Tracts; by Dr Newton, in his Dissertations on Prophecy; and lately by Mr Farmer, in his Dissertations on Miracles: It only remains, that we should search the Scriptures, and point out some Errors in the application of known Truths.'.

Ashdowne's view forms part of a wider stream of similar arguments in the writings of Thomas Hobbes (1651); Arthur Ashley Sykes (1737); Richard Mead (1755) and others, and his 1794 work was cited in general reference works such as the Penny Cyclopedia of 1837.

Among his other works were several focussing on the subject of baptism, including: A dissertation on St. John, iii. 5. In which, from arguments intirely new, is fully made appear from the New Testament, that by the word Spirit, is meant the word of God; ... Likewise that baptism, ... is the only initiating right [sic] into the Kingdom of God, (1798)
