= Fallen angel =

Angel expelled from heaven in Abrahamic religions

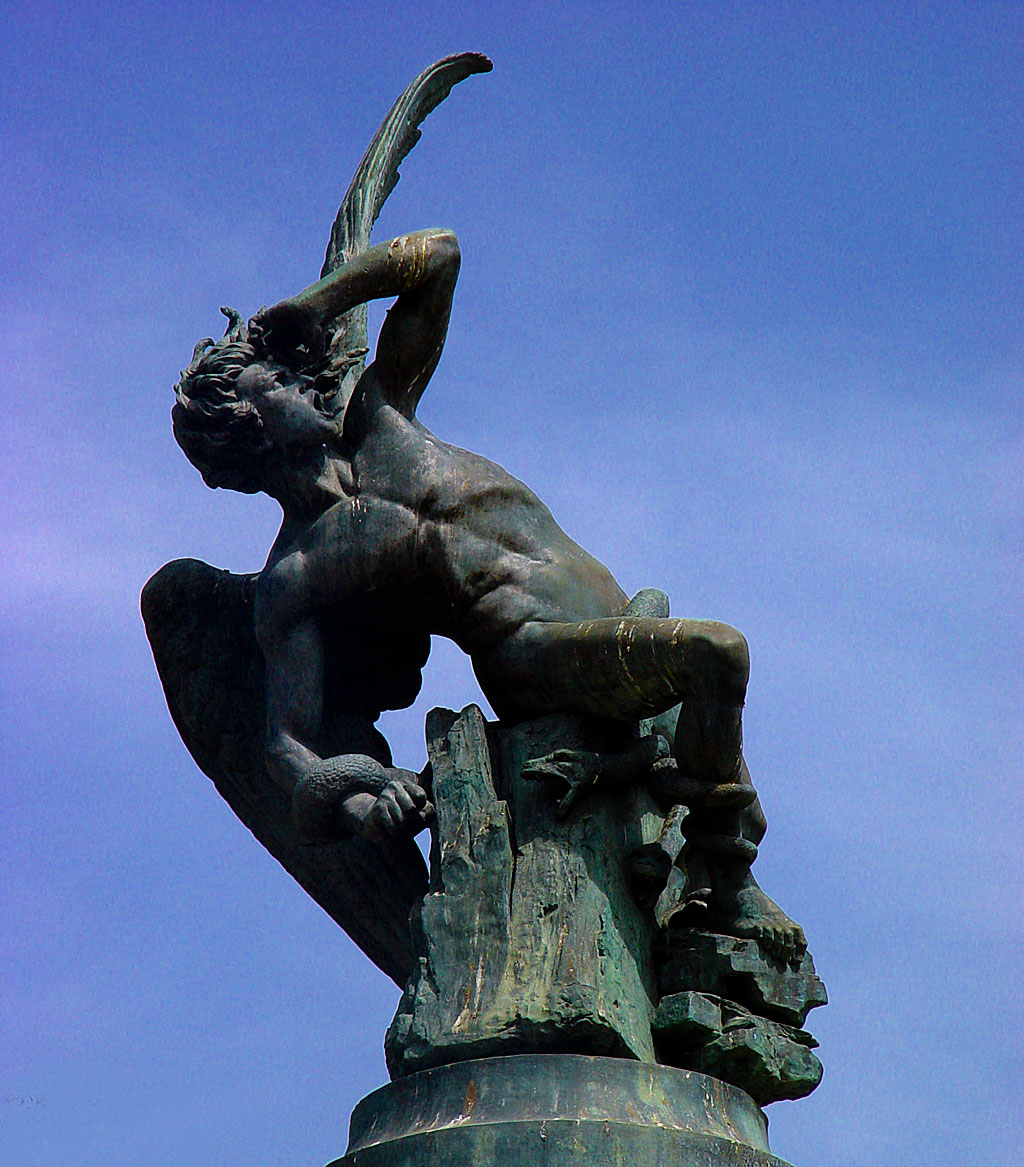
Fountain of the Fallen Angel (1877), by Ricardo Bellver. Retiro Park, Madrid.

Fallen angels are angels who were expelled from Heaven. The literal term "fallen angel" does not appear in any Abrahamic religious texts, but is used to describe angels cast out of heaven. Such angels are often described as corrupting humanity by teaching forbidden knowledge or by tempting them into sin. Common motifs for their expulsion are lust, pride, envy, or an attempt to usurp divinity.

The earliest appearance of the concept of fallen angels may be found in Canaanite beliefs about the bənē hāʾĔlōhīm ('sons of God'), expelled from the divine court. Hêlêl ben Šāḥar is thrown down from heaven for claiming equality with ʻElyōn. Such stories were later collected in the Hebrew Bible (Christian Old Testament) and appear in pseudepigraphic Jewish apocalyptic literature. The concept of fallen angels derives from the position that the "sons of God" (בני האלוהים) mentioned in Genesis 6:1–4 or the Book of Enoch are angels. In the period immediately preceding the composition of the New Testament, some groups of Second Temple Judaism identified these "sons of God" as fallen angels.

During the late Second Temple period the Nephilim were considered to be the monstrous offspring of fallen angels and human women. In such accounts, God sends the Great Deluge to purge the world of these creatures; their bodies are destroyed, yet their souls survive, thereafter roaming the earth as demons. Rabbinic Judaism and early Christian authorities after the third century rejected the Enochian writings and the notion of an illicit union between angels and women.

Christian theology teaches that the sins of fallen angels occur before the beginning of human history. Accordingly, fallen angels became identified with those led by Lucifer in rebellion against God, also equated with demons. The angelic origin of demons was important for Christianity insofar as Christian monotheism holds that evil is a corruption of goodness rather than an independent ontological principle. Conceptualizing fallen angels as purely spiritual beings, both good and evil angels were envisioned as rational beings without bodily limitations. Thus, Western Christian philosophy also implemented the fall of angels as a thought experiment about how evil could occur from within the mind without external influences and explores questions regarding morality.

The Quran refers to motifs reminiscent of fallen angels in earlier Abrahamic writings. However, the interpretation of these beings is disputed. Some Muslim exegetes regard Satan (Iblīs) to be an angel, while others do not. According to the viewpoint of Ibn Abbas (619–687), Iblis was an angel created from fire (nār as-samūm), while according to Hasan of Basra (642–728), he was the progenitor of the jinn. Harut and Marut are a pair of angels mentioned in the Quran who are often said to have fallen to earth due to their negative remarks on humanity.

Fallen angels further appear throughout both Christian and Islamic popular culture, as in Dante Alighieri's Divine Comedy (1308–1320) and John Milton's Paradise Lost (1667).

== Canaanite origin ==
The Elohist sources speak of bənē hāʾĔlōhīm ("sons of God"), manifestations of the Divine (ʾēl) and part of the heavenly court in the Canaanite pantheon. According to Genesis 6:1–4 the bənē hāʾĔlōhīm descended to earth and mated with human women and begat the Nephilim, followed by God sending down a flood to clean the world from humans.

A passage from the Book of Psalms, although at least five hundred years apart from the passage in Genesis, speaks about a similar heavenly court. According to the text, God delivers judgement upon the gods by turning them into mortals. Although the text does not imply that the gods fell from heaven, it parallels their descent from immortality to mortality. Unlike Genesis, the text is silent about the sins of the gods.

As evident from the Hebrew Bible, in later Hebrew tradition, angels became identified with stars. As such, the Book of Isaiah, narrating the fall of a deity in the form of a celestial object, serves as a template for the later belief in fallen angels. According to the Book of Isaiah, Hêlêl ben Šāḥar, son of Šāḥar, known from the Ugaritic poem of Shachar (dawn) and Shalim (dusk), claims equality with ʻElyōn and is then thrown down into the abyss as means of punishment.

== Second Temple period ==
Fallen angels frequently appear in pseudepigraphic Jewish apocalyptic religious texts dated to the Second Temple period between 530 BC and 70 AD: in the Book of Enoch, the Book of Jubilees, and the Qumran Book of Giants. Genesis 6:1–4 serves as the template for the story, but it is unclear if the same myth has existed in the Canaanite period.

Some scholars consider it most likely that the Jewish tradition of fallen angels predates, even in written form, the composition of Gen 6:1–4. (Note: Lester L. Grabbe calls the story of the sexual intercourse between angels and women "an old myth in Judaism". Further, he states: "the question of whether the myth is an interpretation of Genesis or whether Genesis represents a brief reflection of the myth is debated.") In the Book of Enoch, these Watchers "fell" after they became "enamored" with human women. The Second Book of Enoch (Slavonic Enoch) refers to the same beings of the (First) Book of Enoch, as Grigori in the Greek transcription. Compared to the other Books of Enoch, fallen angels play a less significant role in 3 Enoch. 3 Enoch mentions only three fallen angels called Azael, Azza and Uzza. Similar to The first Book of Enoch, they taught sorcery on earth, causing corruption. Unlike the first Book of Enoch, there is no mention of the reason for their fall and, according to 3 Enoch 4.6, they also later appear in heaven objecting to the presence of Enoch.

=== 1 Enoch ===
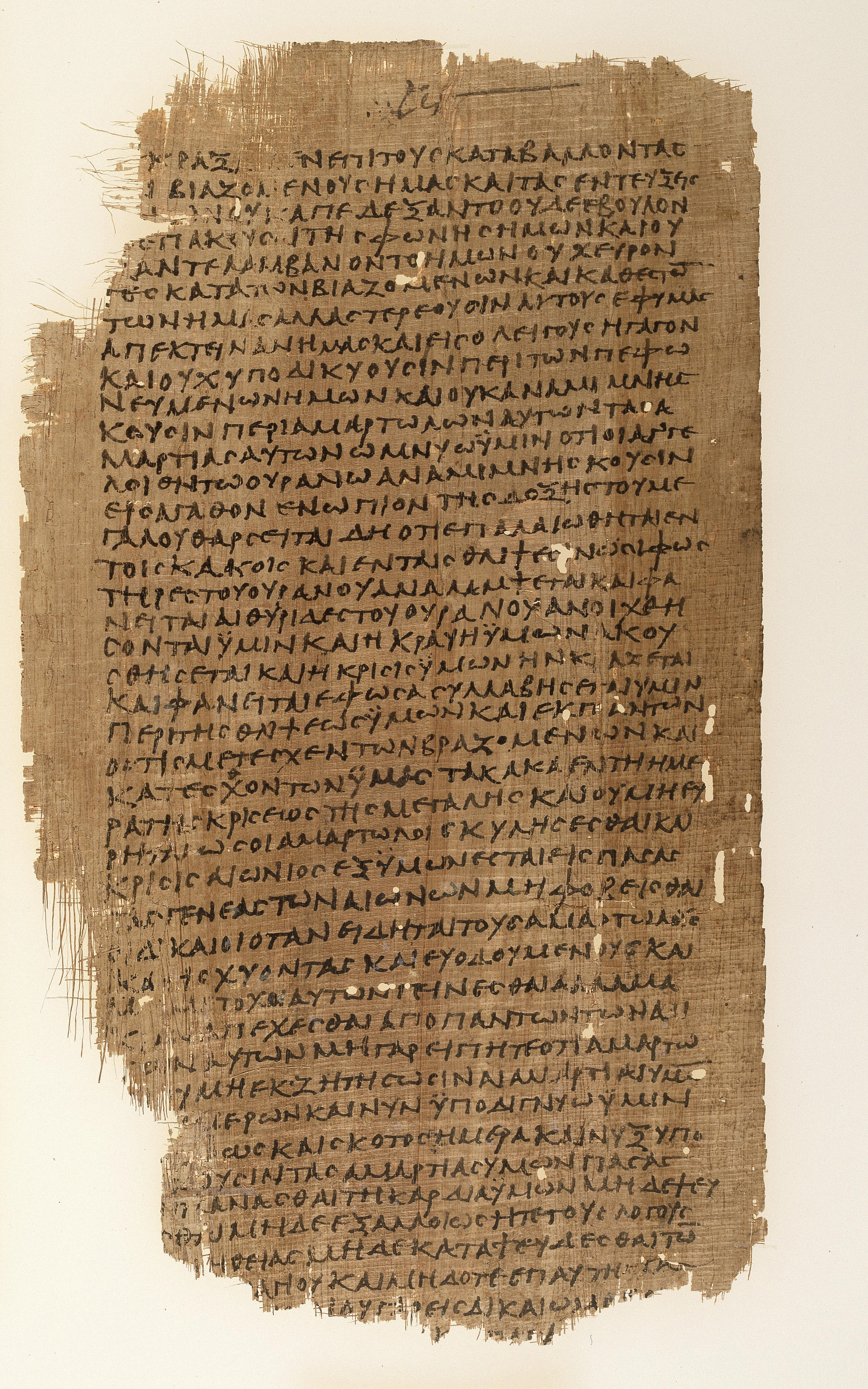
Chester Beatty XII, Greek manuscript of the Book of Enoch, 4th century

According to 1 Enoch 7.2, the Watchers become "enamoured" with human women and have intercourse with them. The offspring of these unions, and the knowledge they were giving, corrupt human beings and the earth (1 Enoch 10.11–12). Eminent among these angels are Samyaza and Azazel. Like many other fallen angels mentioned in 1 Enoch 8.1–9, Azazel introduces men to "forbidden arts", and it is Azazel who is rebuked by Enoch himself for illicit instruction, as stated in 1 Enoch 13.1. According to 1 Enoch 10.6, God sends the archangel Raphael to chain Azazel in the desert Dudael as punishment. Further, Azazel is blamed for the corruption of earth:

1 Enoch 10:12: "All the earth has been corrupted by the effects of the teaching of Azazyel. To him therefore ascribe the whole crime."

An etiological interpretation of 1 Enoch deals with the origin of evil. By shifting the origin of mankind's sin and their misdeeds to illicit angel instruction, evil is attributed to something supernatural from without. This motif, in 1 Enoch, differs from that of later Jewish and Christian theology; in the latter evil is something from within. According to a paradigmatic interpretation, 1 Enoch might deal with illicit marriages between priests and women. As evident from Leviticus 21:1–15, priests were prohibited to marry impure women. Accordingly, the fallen angels in 1 Enoch are the priests counterpart, who defile themselves by marriage. Just like the angels are expelled from heaven, the priests are excluded from their service at the altar. Unlike most other apocalyptic writings, 1 Enoch reflects a growing dissatisfaction with the priestly establishments in Jerusalem in the 3rd century BC. The paradigmatic interpretation parallels the Adamic myth in regard of the origin of evil: In both cases, transcending one's own limitations inherent in their own nature causes their fall. This contrasts the etiological interpretation, which implies another power besides God, in heaven. The latter solution therefore poorly fits into monotheistic thought. Otherwise, the introduction to illicit knowledge might reflect a rejection of foreign Hellenistic culture. Accordingly, the fallen angels represent creatures of Greek mythology, which introduced forbidden arts, used by Hellenistic kings and generals, resulting in oppression of Jews.

=== 2 Enoch ===
The concept of fallen angels is also in the Second Book of Enoch. It tells about Enoch's ascent through the layers of heaven. During his journey, he encounters fallen angels imprisoned in the 2nd heaven. At first, he decides to pray for them, but refuses to do so, since he himself as merely human, would not be worthy to pray for angels. In the 5th heaven however, he meets other rebellious angels, here called Grigori, remaining in grief, not joining the heavenly hosts in song. Enoch tries to cheer them up by telling about his prayers for their fellow angels and thereupon they join the heavenly liturgy.

Strikingly, the text refers to the leader of the Grigori as Satanail and not as Azael or Shemyaza, as in the other Books of Enoch. But the Grigori are identified with the Watchers of 1 Enoch.

The narration of the Grigori in 2 Enoch 18:1–7, who went down on to earth, married women and "befouled the earth with their deeds", resulting in their confinement under the earth, shows that the author of 2 Enoch knew about the stories in 1 Enoch. The longer recension of 2 Enoch, chapter 29 refers to angels who were "thrown out from the height" when their leader tried to become equal in rank with the Lord's power (2 Enoch 29:1–4), an idea probably taken from Ancient Canaanite religion about Attar, trying to rule the throne of Baal.

=== Jubilees ===
The Book of Jubilees, an ancient Jewish religious work, accepted as canonical by the Ethiopian Orthodox Church and Beta Israel, refers to the Watchers, who are among the angels created on the first day. However, unlike the (first) Book of Enoch, the Watchers are commanded by God to descend to earth and to instruct humanity. It is only after they copulate with human women that they transgress the laws of God. These illicit unions result in demonic offspring, who battle each other until they die, while the Watchers are bound in the depths of the earth as punishment. In Jubilees 10:1, another angel called Mastema appears as the leader of the evil spirits. He asks God to spare some of the demons, so he might use their aid to lead humankind into sin. Afterwards, he becomes their leader:

Lord, Creator, let some of them remain before me, and let them harken to my voice, and do all that I shall say unto them; for if some of them are not left to me, I shall not be able to execute the power of my will on the sons of men; for these are for corruption and leading astray before my judgment, for great is the wickedness of the sons of men. (10:8)

Both the (first) Book of Enoch and the Book of Jubilees include the motif of angels introducing evil to humans. However, unlike the Book of Enoch, the Book of Jubilees does not hold that evil was caused by the fall of angels in the first place, although their introduction to sin is affirmed. Further, while the fallen angels in the Book of Enoch are acting against God's will, the fallen angels and demons in the Book of Jubilees seem to have no power independent from God but only act within his power.

== Rabbinic Judaism ==
=== Early Rabbinic literature ===
Although the concept of fallen angels developed from Jewish texts written during the Second Temple period, rabbis from the second century onward turned against the Enochian writings, probably in order to prevent fellow Jews from worship and veneration of angels. Thus, while many angels were individualized and sometimes venerated during the Second Temple period, the status of angels was degraded to a class of creatures on the same level of humans, thereby emphasizing the omnipresence of God. The 2nd-century rabbi Shimon bar Yochai cursed everyone who explained the term "sons of God" as angels. He stated sons of God were actually sons of judges or sons of nobles. Evil was no longer attributed to heavenly forces, now it was dealt as an "evil inclination" (yetzer hara) within humans. In some Midrashic works, the "evil inclination" is attributed to Samael, who is in charge of several satans in order to test humanity. Nevertheless, these angels are still subordinate to God; the reacceptance of rebel angels in Midrashic discourse was posterior and probably influenced by the role of fallen angels in Islamic and Christian lore.

=== Post-Talmudic works ===
The idea of rebel angels in Judaism reappears in the Aggadic-Midrashic work Pirke De-Rabbi Eliezer, which shows not one, but two falls of angels. The first one is attributed to Samael, who refuses to worship Adam and objects to God favoring Adam over the angels, ultimately descending onto Adam and Eve to tempt them into sin. This seems rooted in the motif of the fall of Iblis in the Quran and the fall of Satan in the Cave of Treasures. The second fall echoes the Enochian narratives. Again, the "sons of God" mentioned in Gen 6:1–4 are depicted as angels. During their fall, their "strength and stature became like the sons of man" and again, they give existence to the giants by intercourse with human women.

=== Kabbalah ===
Although not strictly speaking fallen, evil angels reappear in Kabbalah. Some of them are named after angels taken from the Enochian writings, such as Samael. According to the Zohar, just as angels can be created by virtue, evil angels are an incarnation of human vices, which derive from the qlippoth, the representation of impure forces.

However, the Zohar also recalls a narration of two angels in a fallen state, called Aza and Azael. These angels are cast down from the heaven after mistrusting Adam for his inclination towards sin. Once on Earth, they complete the Enochian narrative by teaching magic to humans and producing offspring with them, as well as consorting with Lilith (hailed as "the sinner"). In the narrative, the Zohar affirms but simultaneously prohibits magical practices. As a punishment, God puts the angels in chains, but they still copulate with the demoness Naamah, who gives birth to demons, evil spirits and witches.

== Christianity ==
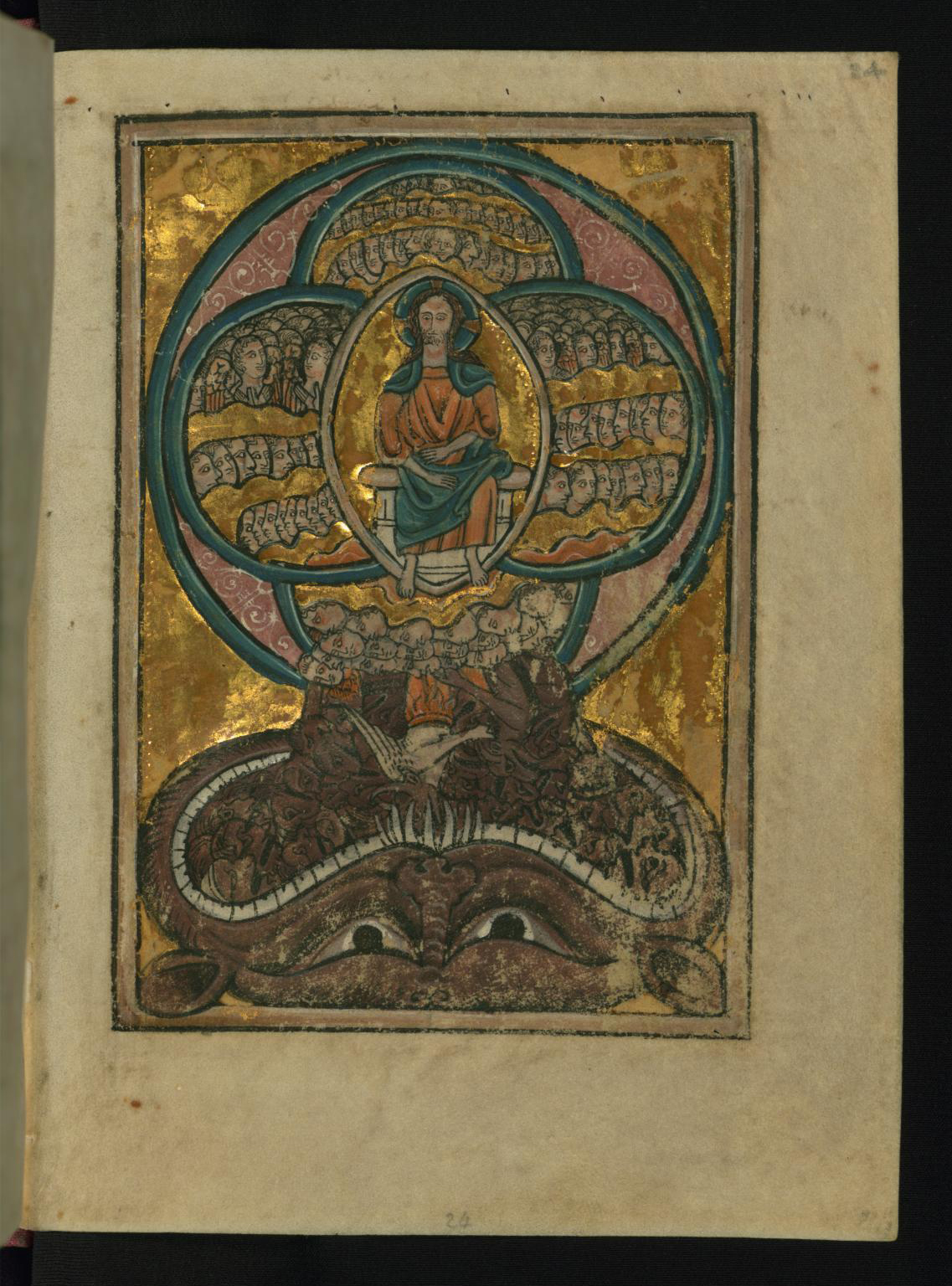
The Fall of the Rebel Angels (Apocryphal) (c. 1250), by William de Brailes. God sits on a throne within a mandorla. The rebelling angels are depicted as falling out of heaven and into a hell, in the shape of a mouth. As they fall, the angels become demons.

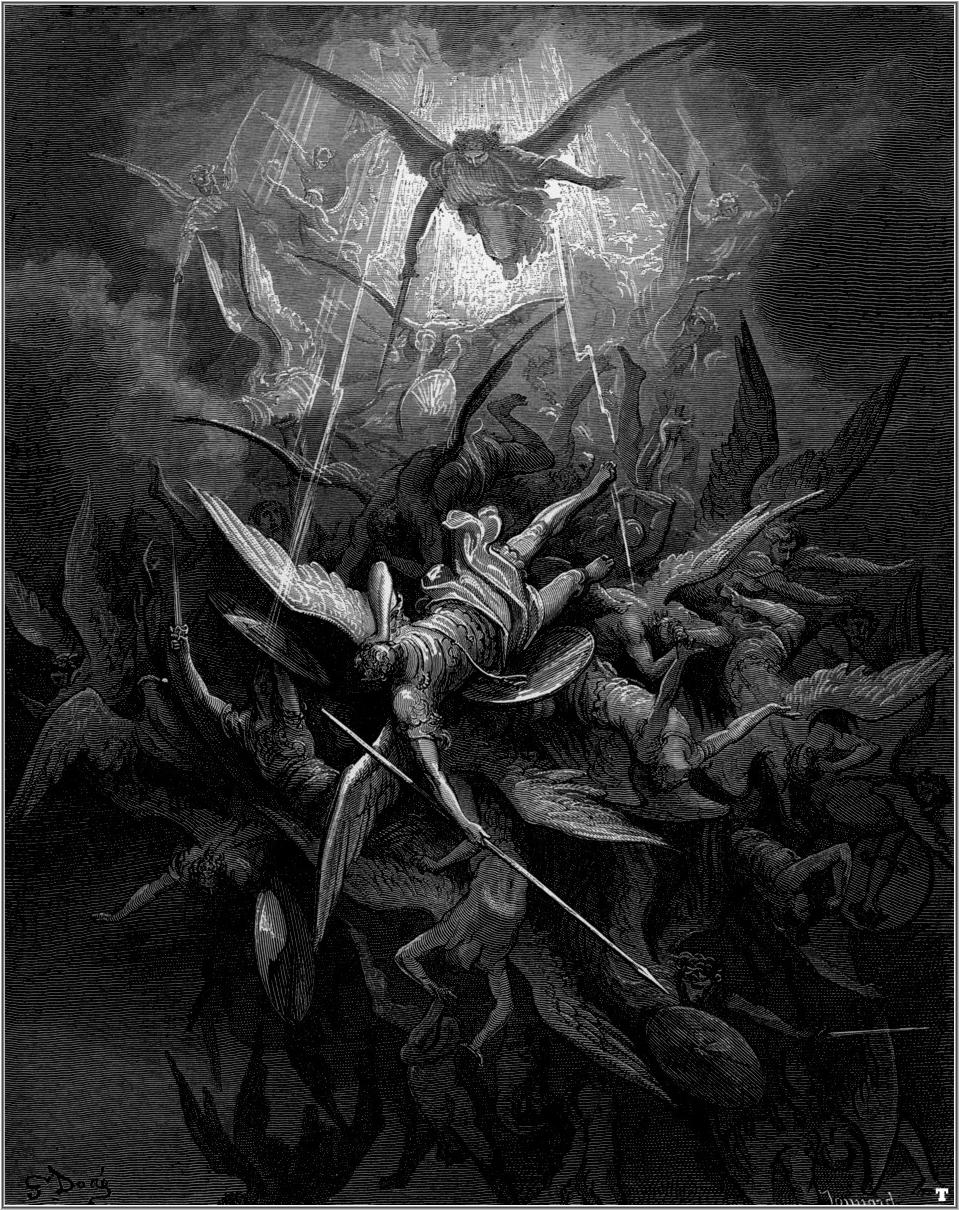
Michael casts out rebel angels. Illustration by Gustave Doré for John Milton's Paradise Lost (1866)

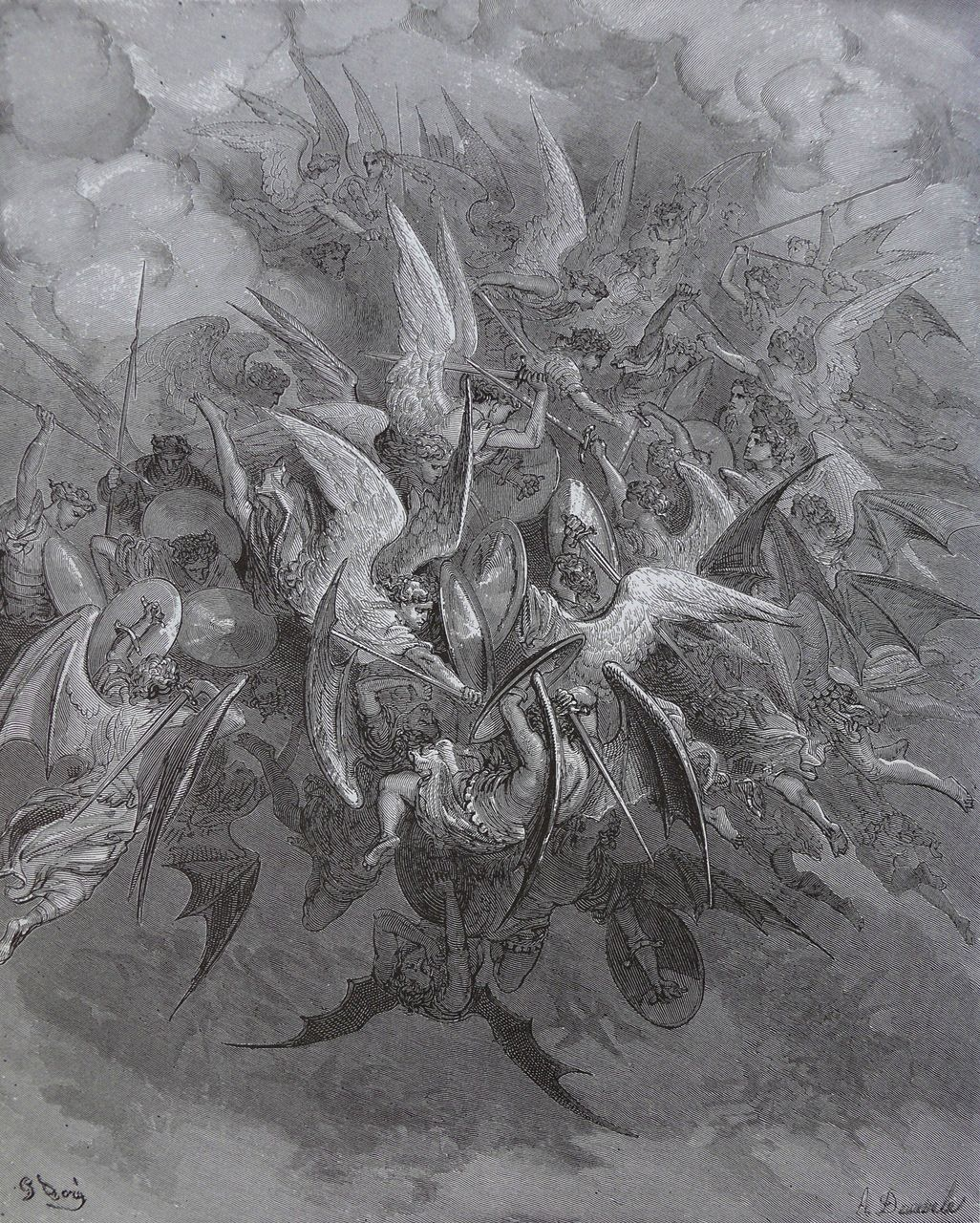
Angels fighting against fallen angels during the War in Heaven. Illustration by Gustave Doré for John Milton's Paradise Lost (1866)

=== Bible ===
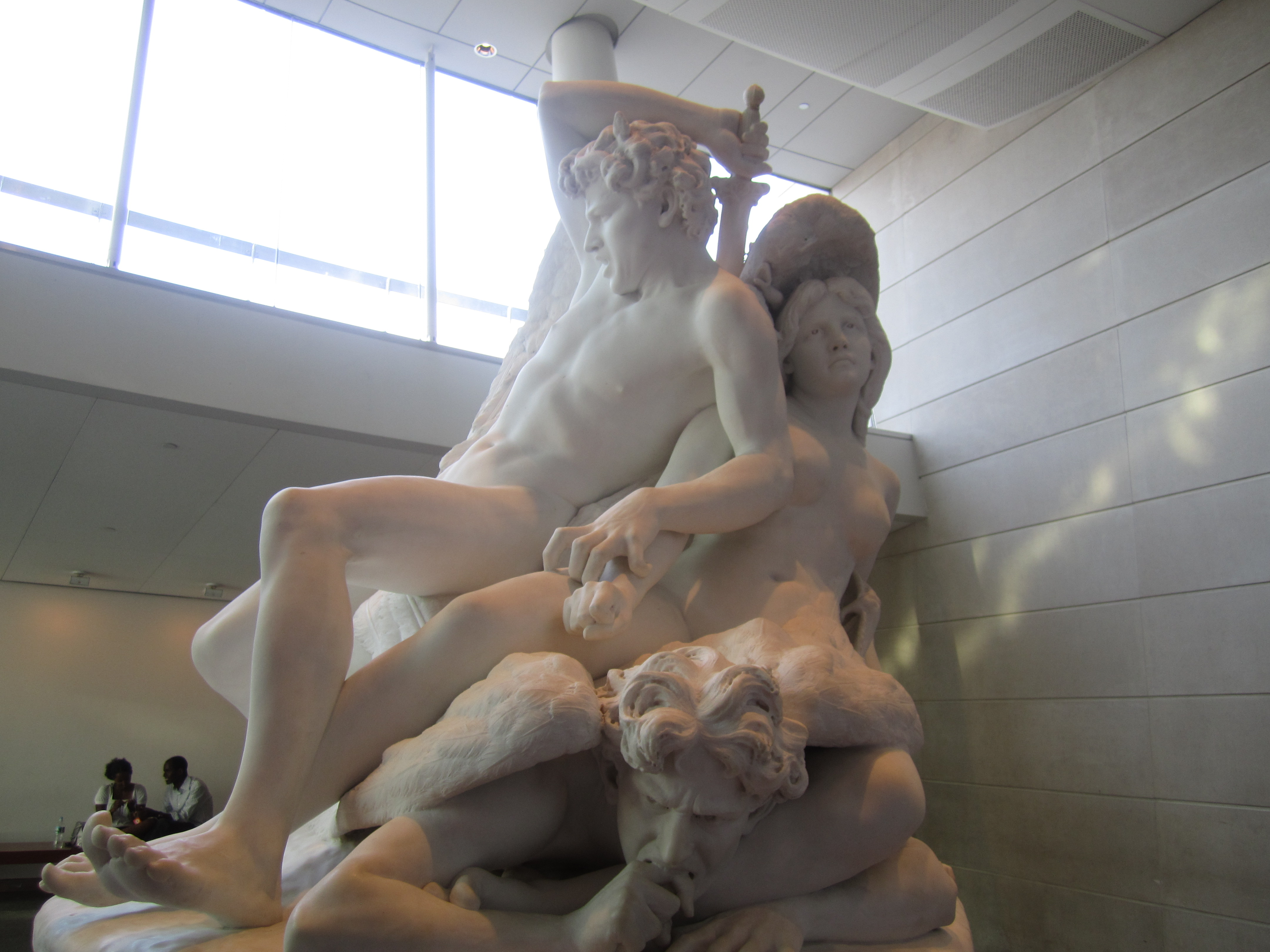
The Fallen Angels (1893), by Salvatore Albano. Brooklyn Museum, New York City

Luke 10:18 refers to "Satan falling from heaven" and Matthew 25:41 mentions "the Devil and his angels", who will be thrown into Hell. All Synoptic Gospels identify Satan as the leader of demons. Paul the Apostle (c. 5 – c. 64 or 67) states in 1 Corinthians 6:3 that there are angels who will be judged, implying the existence of wicked angels. 2 Peter 2:4 and Jude 1:6 refer paraenetically to angels who have sinned against God and await punishment on Judgement Day. The Book of Revelation, chapter 12, speaks of Satan as the "Great Red Dragon" whose "tail swept a third part of the stars of heaven and cast them to the earth". In verses 7–9, Satan is defeated in the War in Heaven against Michael and his angels: "the great dragon was thrown down, that ancient serpent who is called the Devil and Satan, the deceiver of the whole world—he was thrown down to the earth and his angels were thrown down with him". Nowhere within the New Testament are fallen angels identified with demons, but by combining the references to Satan, demons, and angels, early Christian exegetes equated fallen angels with demons, for which Satan was regarded as the leader.

The First Epistle to the Corinthians in 11:10, according to the early Church Father Tertullian, references fallen angels; Tertullian taught that protection from the lust of the fallen angels was the reason for the Apostle Paul's directive to Christian women to wear a headcovering (veil). Tertullian referenced a woman who was touched on the neck by a fallen angel "who found her to be a temptation".

Origen and other early Christian writers linked the fallen morning star of Isaiah 14:12 of the Old Testament to Jesus' statement in Luke 10:18 that he "saw Satan fall like lightning from heaven", as well as a passage about the fall of Satan in Revelation 12:8–9. The Latin word lucifer, as introduced in the late 4th-century AD Vulgate, gave rise to the name for a fallen angel.

Christian tradition has associated Satan not only with the image of the fallen "morning star" in Isaiah 14:12, but also with the denouncing in Ezekiel 28:11–19 of the King of Tyre, who is spoken of as having been a "cherub". The Church Fathers saw these two passages as in some ways parallel, an interpretation also testified in apocryphal and pseudepigraphic works. However, "no modern evangelical commentary on Isaiah or Ezekiel sees Isaiah 14 or Ezekiel 28 as providing information about the fall of Satan".

=== Early Christianity ===
During the period immediately before the rise of Christianity, the intercourse between the Watchers and human women was often seen as the first fall of the angels. Christianity stuck to the Enochian writings at least until the third century. Many Church Fathers such as Irenaeus, Justin Martyr, Clement of Alexandria, and Lactantius accepted the association of the angelic descent to the sons of God passage in Genesis 6:1–4. However, some Christian ascetics, such as Origen (c. 184 – c. 253 AD), rejected this interpretation. According to the Church Fathers who rejected the doctrine by Origen, these angels were guilty of having transgressed the limits of their nature and of desiring to leave their heavenly abode to experience sensual experiences. Irenaeus referred to fallen angels as apostates, who will be punished by an everlasting fire. Justin Martyr (c. 100 – c. 165) identified pagan deities as fallen angels or their demonic offspring in disguise. Justin also held them responsible for Christian persecution during the first centuries. Tertullian and Origen also referred to fallen angels as teachers of astrology.

The Babylonian king, who is described as a fallen "morning star" in Isaiah 14:1–17, was probably the first time identified with a fallen angel by Origen. This description was interpreted typologically both as an angel and a human king. The image of the fallen morning star or angel was thereby applied to Satan by early Christian writers, following the equation of Lucifer to Satan in the pre-Christian century.

=== Roman Catholicism ===
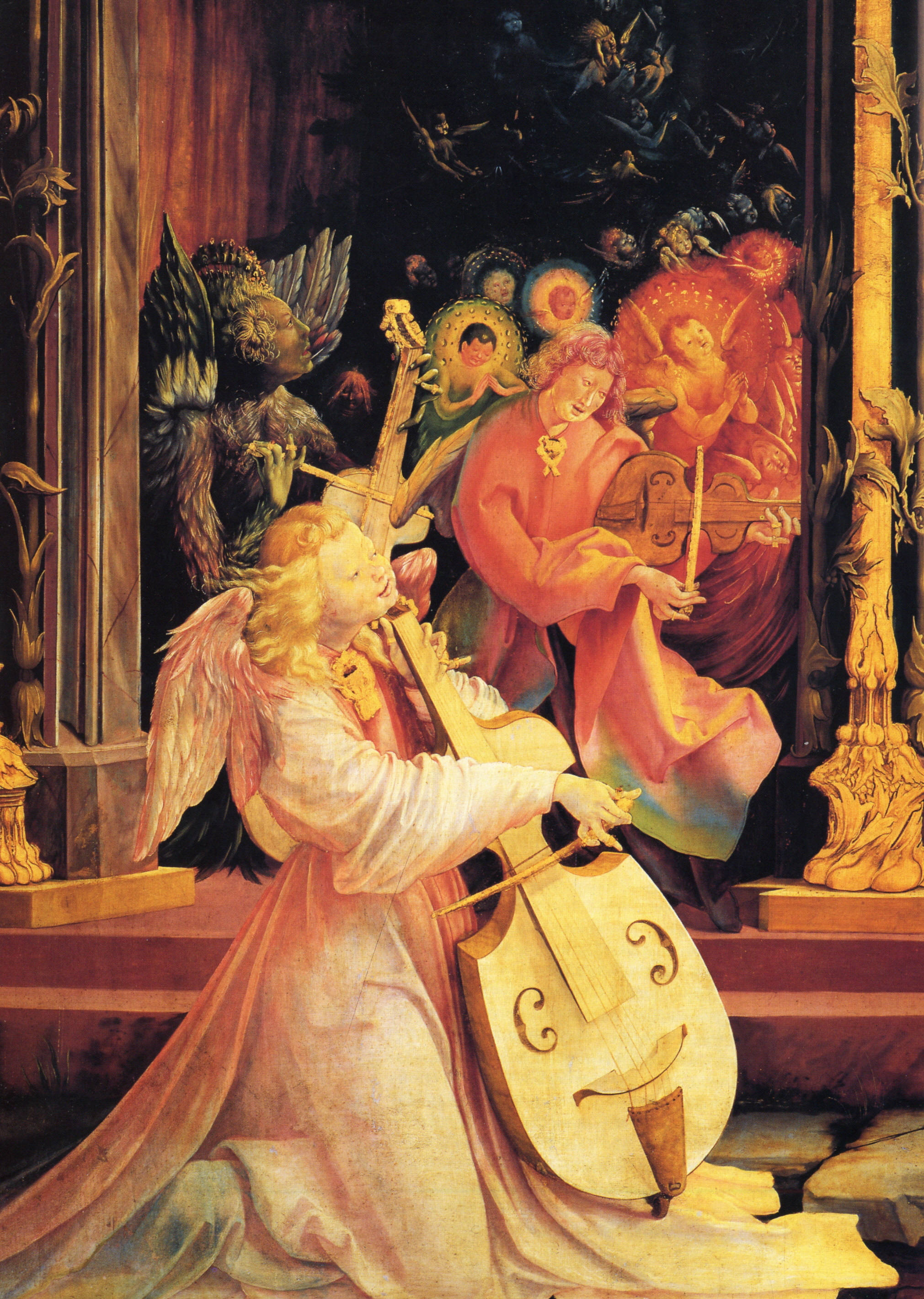
Isenheim Altarpiece (c. 1512-1616), by Matthias Grünewald. Concert of Angels (detail), with Lucifer in feather costume and fallen angels in the background.

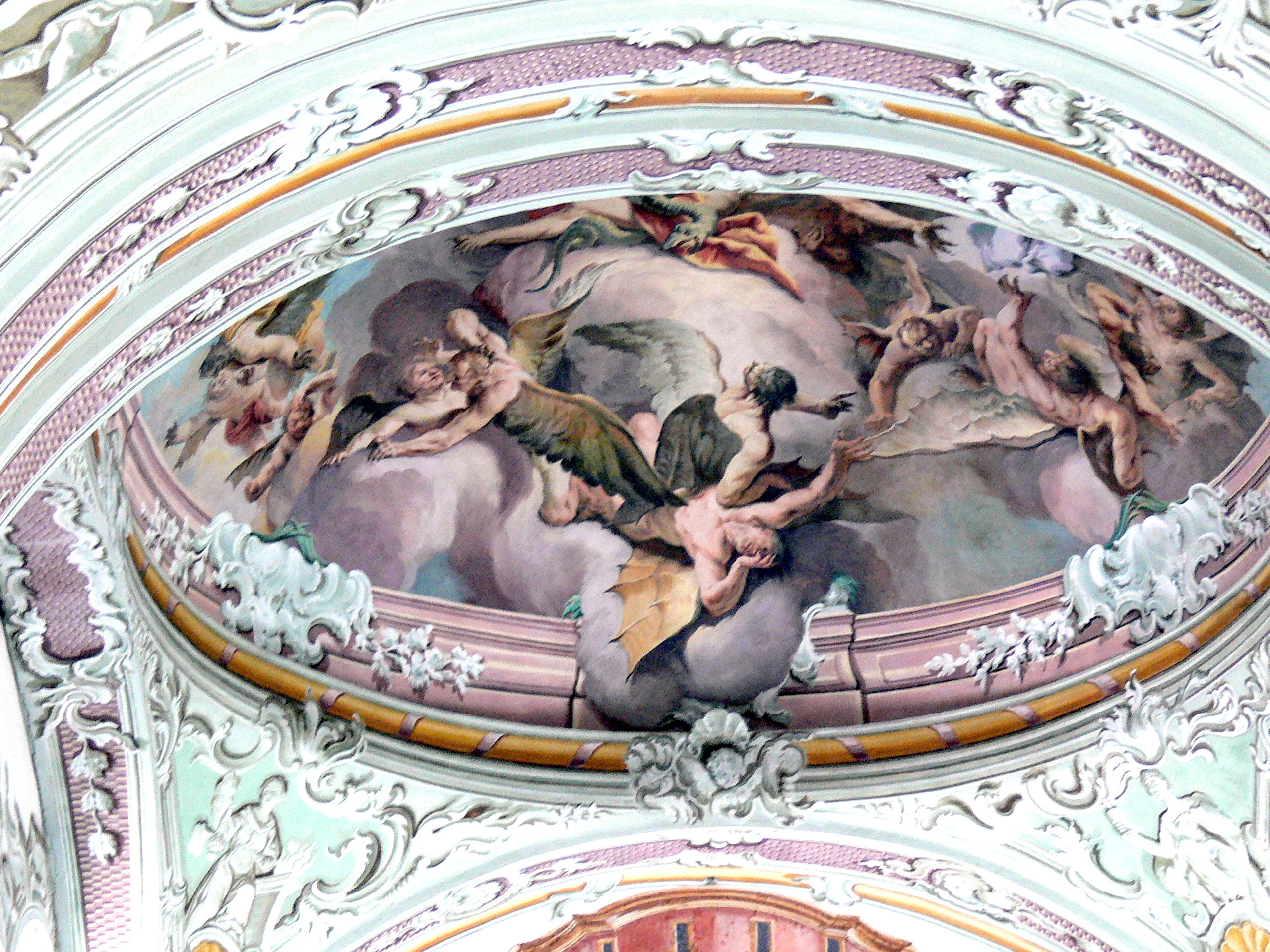
Frescos depicting the fall of the rebelling angels (1760), by Christoph Anton Mayr. Saint Michael Parish Church, Innichen, South Tyrol.

The subject of fallen angels is covered in a number of catechisms of the Roman Catholic Church, including Rev. George Hay's in which he answers the question What was the sin by which they fell?: "It was pride, arising from the great beauty and sublime graces which God had bestowed upon them. For, seeing themselves such glorious beings, they fell in love with themselves, and, forgetting the God that made them, wished to be on an equality with their Creator." The consequence of this fall being that, "they were immediately deprived of all their supernatural graces and heavenly beauty: they were changed from glorious angels into hideous devils; they were banished out of heaven, and condemned to the torments of hell, which was prepared to receive them."

In terms of the history of fallen angel theology it is thought to be rooted in Enochian literature, which Christians began to reject by the 3rd century. The sons of God came to be identified merely with righteous men, more precisely with descendants of Seth who had been seduced by women descended from Cain. The cause of evil was shifted from the superior powers of angels, to humans themselves, and to the very beginning of history; the expulsion of Satan and his angels on the one hand and the original sin of humans on the other hand. However, the Book of Watchers, which identified the sons of God with fallen angels, was not rejected by Syriac Christians or the Ethiopian Orthodox Tewahedo Church. Augustine of Hippo's work Civitas Dei (5th century) became the major opinion of Western demonology and for the Catholic Church. He rejected the Enochian writings and stated that the sole origin of fallen angels was the rebellion of Satan. As a result, fallen angels came to be equated with demons and depicted as non-sexual spiritual entities. The exact nature of their spiritual bodies became another topic of dispute during the Middle Ages. Augustine based his descriptions of demons on his perception of the Greek daimon. The Daimon was thought to be a spiritual being, composed of ethereal matter, a notion also used for fallen angels by Augustine. However, these angels received their ethereal body only after their fall. Later scholars tried to explain the details of their spiritual nature, asserting that the ethereal body is a mixture of fire and air, but that they are still composed of material elements. Others denied any physical relation to material elements, depicting the fallen angels as purely spiritual entities. But even those who believed the fallen angels had ethereal bodies did not believe that they could produce any offspring.

Augustine, in his Civitas Dei describes two cities (Civitates) distinct from each other and opposed to each other like light and darkness. The earthly city is caused by the act of rebellion of the fallen angels and is inhabited by wicked men and demons (fallen angels) led by Satan. On the other hand, the heavenly city is inhabited by righteous men and the angels led by God. Although, his ontological division into two different kingdoms shows resemblance of Manichean dualism, Augustine differs in regard of the origin and power of evil. In Augustine works, evil originates from free will. Augustine always emphasized the sovereignty of God over the fallen angels. Accordingly, the inhabitants of the earthly city can only operate within their God-given framework. The rebellion of angels is also a result of the God-given freedom of choice. The obedient angels are endowed with grace, giving them a deeper understanding of God's nature and the order of the cosmos. Illuminated by God-given grace, they became incapable of feeling any desire for sin. The other angels, however, are not blessed with grace, thus they remain capable of sin. After these angels decide to sin, they fall from heaven and become demons. In Augustine's view of angels, they cannot be guilty of carnal desires since they lack flesh, but they can be guilty of sins that are rooted in spirit and intellect such as pride and envy. However, after they have made their decision to rebel against God, they cannot turn back. The Catechism of the Catholic Church understands the fall of angels as radical and irrevocable rejection of God and his reign by some angels who, though created as good beings, freely chose evil, their sin being unforgivable because of the irrevocable character of their choice, not because of any defect in infinite divine mercy. Present-day Catholicism rejects Apocatastasis, the reconciliation with God suggested by the Church Father Origen.

=== Orthodox Christianity ===
==== Eastern Orthodox Christianity ====
Like Roman Catholicism, Eastern Orthodox Christianity shares the basic belief in fallen angels as spiritual beings who rebel against God. Unlike Roman Catholicism, however, there is no established doctrine about the exact nature of fallen angels, but Eastern Orthodox Christianity unanimously agrees that the power of fallen angels is always inferior to God. Therefore, belief in fallen angels can always be assimilated with local lore, as long it does not break basic principles and is in line with the Bible. Historically, some Eastern Orthodox theologians even tend to suggest that fallen angels could be rehabilitated in the world to come. Fallen angels, just like angels, play a significant role in the spiritual life of believers. As in Roman Catholicism, fallen angels are believed to tempt and incite people into sin, but mental illness is also linked to the influence of fallen angels. Those who have reached an advanced degree of spirituality are even thought to be able to envision them. Rituals and sacraments performed by Eastern Orthodox priests are thought to weaken such demonic influences.

==== Ethiopian Orthodox Tewahedo Church ====
Unlike most other Christian churches, the Ethiopian Orthodox Tewahedo Church accepts 1 Enoch and the Book of Jubilees as canonical. As a result, the Church believes that human sin does not originate in Adam's transgression alone, but also from Satan and other fallen angels. Together with demons, they continue to cause sin and corruption on earth.

=== Protestantism ===
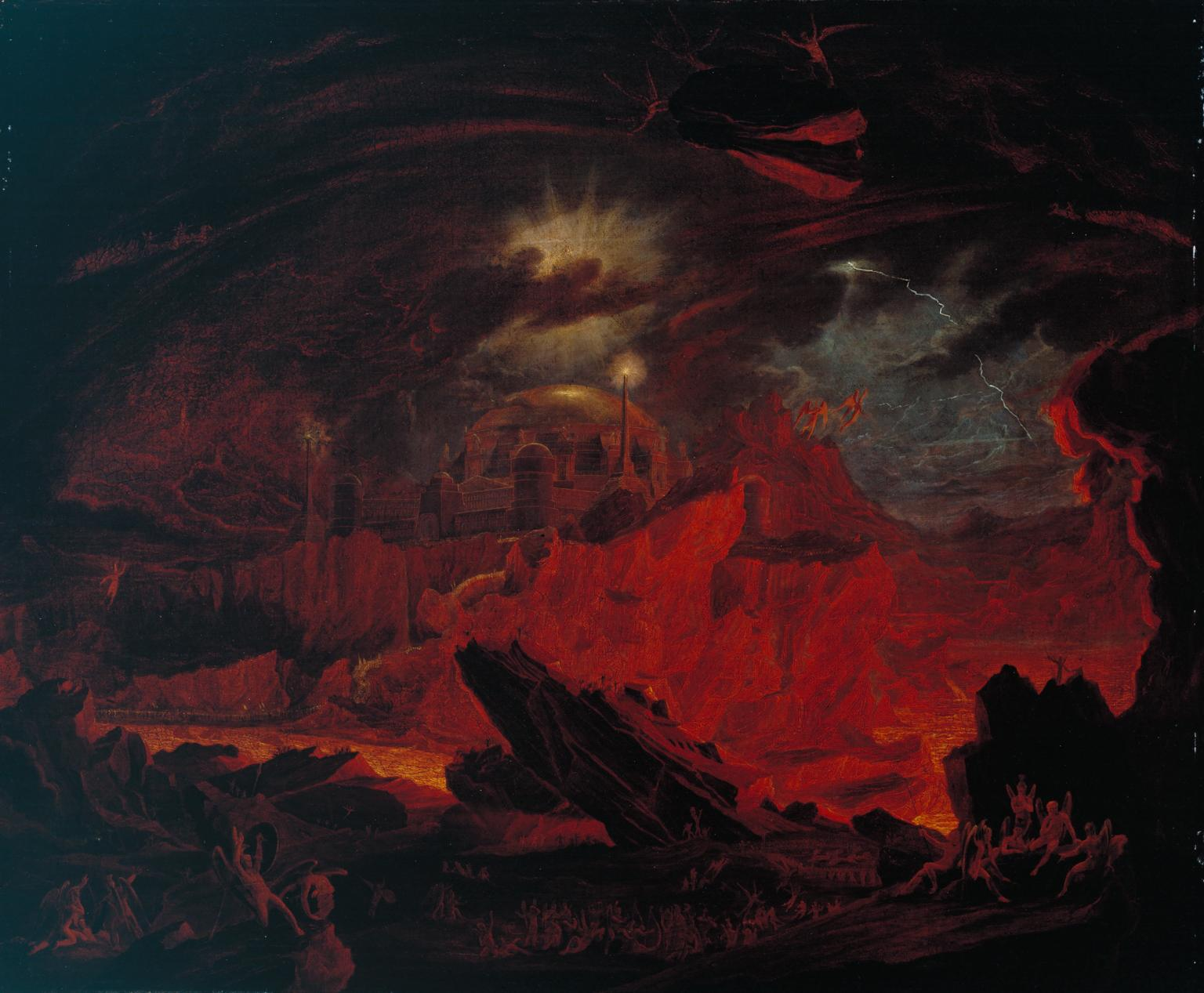
Fallen angels in Hell (c. 1841), by John Martin

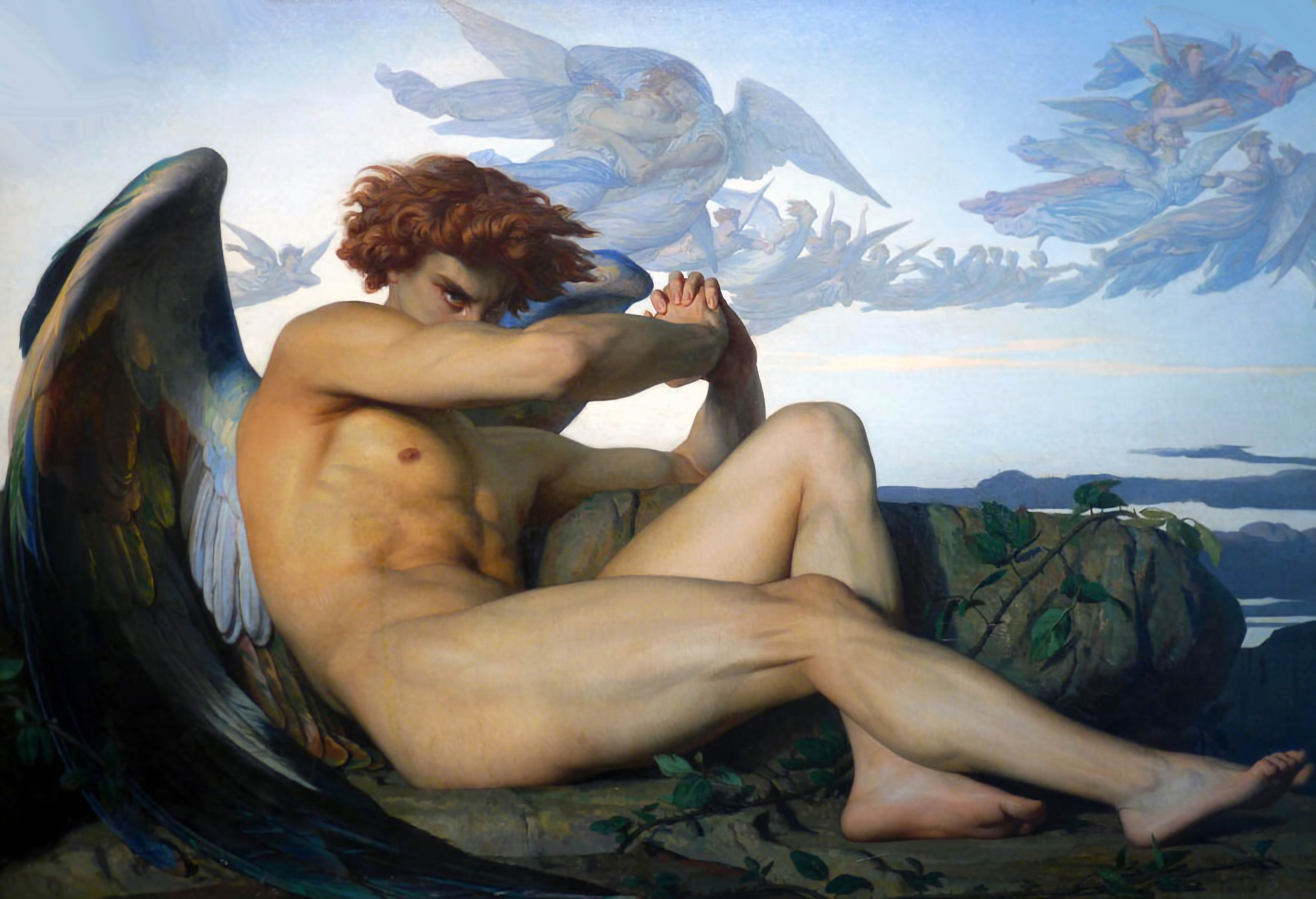
The Fallen Angel (1847), by Alexandre Cabanel, depicting Lucifer.

Like Roman Catholicism, Protestantism continues with the concept of fallen angels as spiritual entities unrelated to flesh, but it rejects the angelology and demonology established by the Roman Catholic Church. Martin Luther's (1483–1546) Sermons of the Angels merely recount the exploits of the fallen angels, and does not deal with an angelic hierarchy. Satan and his fallen angels are believed to be responsible for some misfortune in the world, but Luther always believed that the power of the good angels exceeds those of the fallen ones. The Italian Protestant theologian Girolamo Zanchi (1516–1590) offered further explanations for the reason behind the fall of the angels. According to Zanchi, the angels rebelled when the incarnation of Jesus Christ as the Son of God was revealed to them in incomplete form. While Mainline Protestants are much less concerned with the cause of angelic fall, arguing that it is neither useful nor necessary to know, other Protestant churches do have fallen angels as more of a focus.

=== Philosophy ===
Monotheism parted from cosmological dualism by insisting on the good origin of all things. This contrasts with alternative views, such as Manichaeism, proposing absolute evil as an entirely separate ontological principle. With the proposition that there is only one ultimate principle, Christian philosophy threatened the hypothesis that God can only cause good and needed to explain the origins of moral evil.

Thus, in Western Christian philosophy the fall of angels served as a thought experiment on how moral evil originates. Angels, as purely spiritual beings, were an example on how someone chooses evil despite optimal psychological and cognitive conditions. While according to many theories of Ancient Greek philosophy hold an intellectualist account of morality (i.e. that evil derives from an impeded intellectual cognition) the sin of angels, who are purely spiritual beings, needed an alternative explanation.

The voluntarist account asserts that angels sinned by their own volition. While the intellectualists need to explain how a spiritual being can suffer from cognitive deficiencies, voluntarists need to explain how beings under the same psychological conditions make different moral choices.

Thomas Aquinas (c. 1225 – 7 March 1274), following an intellectualist approach, argued that the mind cannot comprehend all thoughts at once. As such, angels only consider on whatever they focus on, but if they do not focus on the highest good, they commit evil actions. Henry of Ghent (c. 1217 – 29 June 1293) asserts that evil volition must precede mistaken consideration. Defective reasoning is described as the result of evil will.

In the discussion concerning theodicy, the question of how evil can exist simultaneously with the existence of an all-powerful and all-good God, fallen angels are also proposed as an explanation for natural evil. The theory proposes that fallen angels can influence nature and cause suffering through natural disasters. Combined with the free-will of angels, natural disasters too may result from evil volition.

=== Folklore ===
In Christian folklore tales about encounters between men and spirits, the spirits were often explained as fallen angels. They would have been cast out of heaven, damned to roam the world as demons, but were not so evil that they were sentenced to hell, like Lucifer and his devils. Yet they were still not as good to remain in heaven.

Caesarius of Heisterbach's (c. 1180 – c. 1240) asserted that not all fallen angels are equally bad. Some fallen angels would be banished for not actively defending God against Lucifer, but since they did not side with the devils, they would not be sentenced to hell. They remain loyal to God on earth, do good deeds, and bearing some resemblances to saints, as seen in the Dialogus Miraculorum, in which a knight is guided by a fallen angel to lead him back on the path of piety. In another tale, a neutral fallen angel became an assistant of a noble knight. However, when the knight learned that his best assistant was actually a demon, he dismissed him. When the knight wants to pay the demon for his service, the demon asserted that the knight should spend the money on a new bell for the church, instead.

According to The Brendan Voyage, during the Medieval Age, Brendan meets a group of angels referred to as "wandering spirits". On holy days, they were embodied as white birds, symbols usually used for purity and the holy spirit. In later versions, such as the 15th Century Dutch and German variant, the fallen angels are much more depicted as akin to grotesque demons. Although they would not have supported Lucifer in his evil schemes, they would have been passive and not fighting for good, thus turned into animal-like creatures cast out of heaven.

Such earthly fallen angels were used as a possible origin of fairies in Irish and Scandinavian folk-tales. Depending on the place they fell, they will remain as spirits of the specific element, but are usually benevolent and harmless. If such fairies were identified with the Biblical fallen angels, their salvation after Judgement Day was usually denied, since the fallen angels could not return to heaven. Later Protestant thinkers increasingly dismissed belief in fairies and neutral angels as part of either fairy-tales or a delusion cast by Satan.

== Islam ==
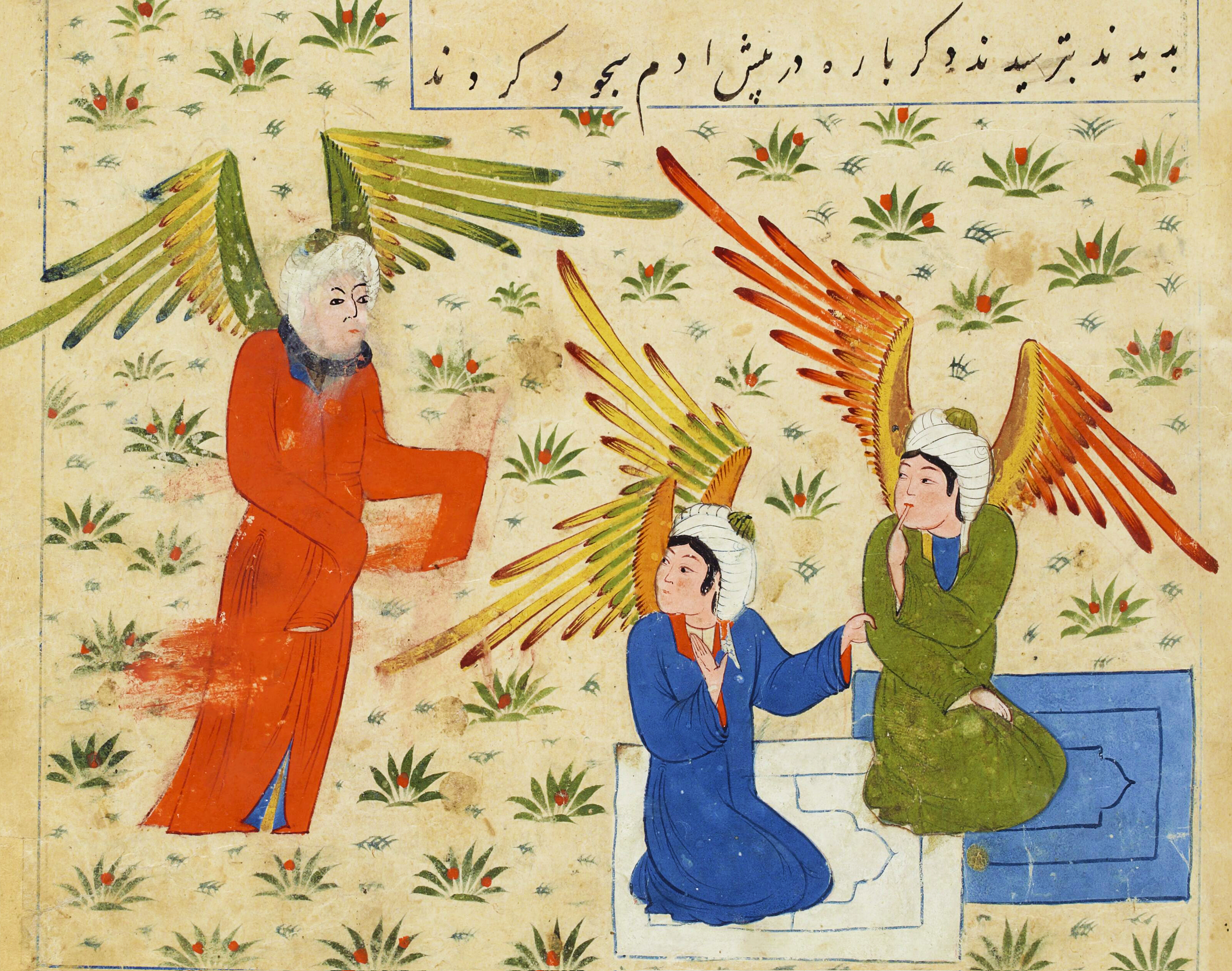
Two angels turn back and see with alarm that Iblīs will not bow down before ʾĀdam. 1388 Persian miniature from a manuscript of ʿAjāʾib al-Makhlūqāt ("Wonders of Creation") by al-Ṭūsī Salmānī, century.

Although sometimes denied, fallen angels were widely accepted in Classical Islam. (Note: "Iblis was one of the angels according to the vast majority of scholars – including Ibn 'Abbas, Ibn Mas'ud, Ibn Jurayj, Ibn al-Musayyab, Qatada, and others; and it is the preferred position of the Shaykh Abu al-Hasan [al-Ashari], Al-Tabari considered it the preponderant one, and it is the apparent meaning of the verse [And when We said unto the angels: Prostrate yourselves before Adam, they fell prostrate, all save [Iblis]. Ibn Abbas said: "His name was 'Azazil and he was among the nobility of the angels; he possessed four wings. Then after that he despaired (ablasa).") (Note: "Although it is sometimes denied that Iblis was a fallen-angel, this is fully accepted by the classical commentators, e.g., Baydawi, I:51; see also Tabari, 1961 I:83.)) The three most famous in Islam being mentioned in the Quran: Iblis, Harut and Marut. Objection towards the concept of fallen angels, however, is attested as early as to the influential Islamic ascetic Hasan of Basra (642–728), who denied the possibility of angels sinning. (Note: "There is no unanimity among scholars when it comes to the sinlessness of angels. The majority, of course, take the view that they are sinless. They start from the Quran and refer to individual verses that speak for it, such as (66: 6 and (21:20). Hasan is counted among as one of the first representatives of this doctrine, but he obviously appears to be one step further than his contemporaries: he did not settle for the verses that speak for it, but tried to reinterpret the verses that speak against it differently." "In der Frage nach der Sündlosigkeit der Engel herrscht keine Einstimmigkeit unter den Gelehrten. Die Mehrheit vertritt freilich, die Ansicht, dass sie sündlos sind. Sie geht vom Koran aus und beruft sich auf einzelne Verse, die dafür sprechen, wie zum Beispiel (66:6 und (21:20). Zu ihnen wird Hasan als einer der ersten Vertreter dieser Lehre gezählt. Er scheint aber offentsichtlich noch einen Schritt weiter mit dieser Frage gekommen zu sein als seine Zeitgenossen. Er begnüngte sich nicht mit den Versen, die dafür sprechen, sondern versuchte, auch die Verse, die gerade dagegen sprechen, anders zu interpretieren.") Interpretations deriving from the companions of Muhammad, such as Ibn Abbas (619–687) and Abd Allah ibn Mas'ud (594–653) on the other hand legitimized the concept of fallible angels. Many classical Sunni scholars had interpretations in which these figures can be described as ‘fallen’, and adhered to this opinion. However, modern Sunni scholars are of the opinion that fallen angels are not part of Islamic belief and origin.

Opposition to the concept of the fallen angel is mostly found among the Qadariyah and most Mu'tazilites. Many Salafis also agree with this view. Those who oppose angelic fallibility refer to Surah at-Tahrim (66:6) in favor of their position:

O believers! Protect yourselves and your families from a Fire whose fuel is people and stones, overseen by formidable and severe angels, who never disobey whatever Allah orders—always doing as commanded.

Those who are in support of the concept of fallen angels (including Tabari, Suyuti, al-Nasafi, and al-Māturīdī) refer to al-Anbiya (21:29) stating that angels would be punished for sins and arguing that, if angels could not sin, they would not be warned to refrain from committing them:

Whoever of them were to say, "I am a god besides Him", they would be rewarded with Hell by Us [...]

It has been argued, even if fallen angels are considered, they are conceptually different from the fallen angels in Christianity, since they remain at the service of God and do not become God's enemies. It has been stated that "(...) according to Christianity, the devils are fallen angels who renounced their loyalty to God, in Islam it is God who dismissed the fallen angels". Unlike Christian tradition, fallen angels may return to their former state in the angelic hierarchy, if forgiven.

Besides the Quran, other Islamic works allude to fallen angels. According to the Isma'ilism work Umm al-Kitāb, ʿAzāzīl, is the first creation of God. Because God gifted him the ability of creation, he claims divinity and is thrown into lower celestial spheres until he ends up on earth. In a Shia narrative attributued to Ja'far al-Sadiq (700 or 702–765), Idris (Enoch) meets an angel, which the wrath of God falls upon, and his wings and hair are cut off; after Idris prays for him to God, his wings and hair are restored. In a similar story, a cherub called Fuṭrus (فطرس) was cast out from heaven and fell to the earth, but is restored after he touches al-Husayn's cradle. The idea that fallen angels can be forgiven through means of intercession also appears in the legendary tales of Muslim saints.

Some recent non-Islamic scholars suggest Uzair, who is according to Surah 9:30 called a son of God by Jews, originally referred to a fallen angel. While exegetes almost unanimously identified Uzair as Ezra, (Note: Nevertheless, a narrative attributed to Ibn Hazm states that the angel Sandalphon blamed the Jews for venerating Metatron as "son of God" "10 days each year".) there is no historical evidence that the Jews called him son of God. Thus, the Quran may refer not to the earthly Ezra, but to the heavenly Ezra, identifying him with the heavenly Enoch, who in turn became identified with the angel Metatron (also called lesser YHWH) in Merkabah mysticism.

=== Iblis ===
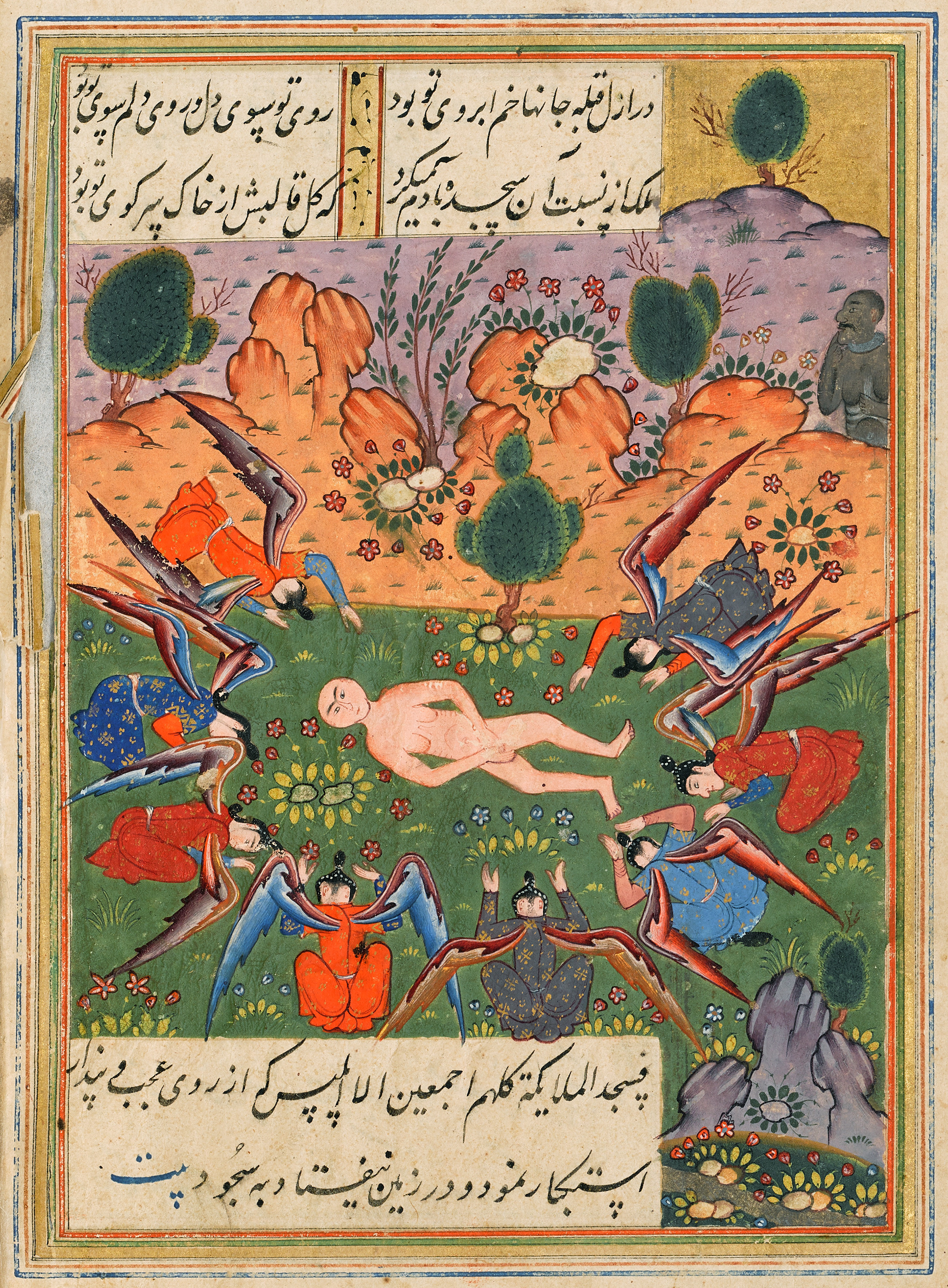
Depiction of Iblis, black-faced and without hair (top-right of the picture). He refuses to prostrate himself with the other angels

The Quran repeatedly tells about the fall of Iblīs, whose story is referred to throughout the Quran. Iblīs refuses to bow before Adam, whereupon he is banished from heaven. In Surah 15:36, Iblīs requests God to tempt humans into sin to prove their unworthiness, and God complies. Surah 38:82 reiterates that Iblīs' intrigues to lead humans astray are permitted by God's power. However, as mentioned in Surah 17:65, Iblīs' attempts to mislead God's servants are destined to fail.

The Quranic episode of Iblīs parallels the wicked angel in the earlier Books of Jubilees: Like Iblīs, Mastema requests God's permission to tempt humanity, and both are limited in their power, that is, not able to deceive God's servants. However, the motif of Iblīs' disobedience derives not from the Watcher mythology, but can be traced back to the Cave of Treasures, a work that probably holds the standard explanation in Proto-orthodox Christianity for the angelic fall of Satan: Satan refuses to prostrate himself before Adam, because he is "fire and spirit" and thereupon Satan is banished from heaven. Unlike the majority opinion in later Christianity, the idea that Iblīs attempts to usurp the throne of God is alien to Islam and due to its strict monotheism unthinkable.

According to a narration (Qaṣaṣ) by Ibn Abbas (619–687), before the creation of Adam, angels (malāʾikah) battled with the jinn. After the jinn were defeated and God (Allah) announces to create humans as a successor, the angels protest, arguing they cause corruptions as the jinn did before. Iblīs, their leader, views humans as inferior beings, which leads to his refusal mentioned in the Quran. Those angels who joined Iblīs became the opponents of mankind. (Note: translation: (in English) "The devils are the fallen angels who, along with Iblis, refused to worship Adam by prostrating themselves before him at God's command. They are called shayāṭīn in multiple numbers, and shayṭān Satan in single numbers, to which word a curse or the word redschim, i.e., the one to be stoned, is always added, (...)" original: (in German) "Die Teufel sind die gefallenen Engel, welche sich mit Iblis weigerten auf Befehl Gottes den Adam, sich vor ihm niederwerfend, zu verehren, sie heissen in der vielfachen Zahl Schejathin, in der einfachen Zahl Scheitan Satan, welchem Wort immer ein Fluch oder das Wort redschim, d.i. der zu Steinigende, beigesetzt wird, (...).") The story is used to complement the events in Surah 2:30-34.

The command to bow down before Adam is often seen as God testing the angels. Maqdisi (965/966CE) writes:

The meaning is that Allah knows that there are those among the angels who would cause rebellion and corruption and bloodshed, but the angels do not know this. Allah said to the angels: "See, I am going to create mankind from clay; so when I have formed him and breathed into him some of My spirit, fall down to him in obeisance." (Q, 28:72-72) The angels listened to His words and obeyed His voice and complied, all of theme except Iblīs, the enemy of Allah. . . . When Allah had created Adam and breated His spirit into him, He ordered the angels to bow down to him in order to test them, and especially so as to test Iblīs. This bowing was a greeting (tahiyya) and not an expression of worship ('‘ibādah) to him. Others say that they were ordered to bow to Adam as the Muslim bows to the qibla, and they all bowed down, as the Qurʾān tells us, except Iblīs.

=== Harut and Marut ===
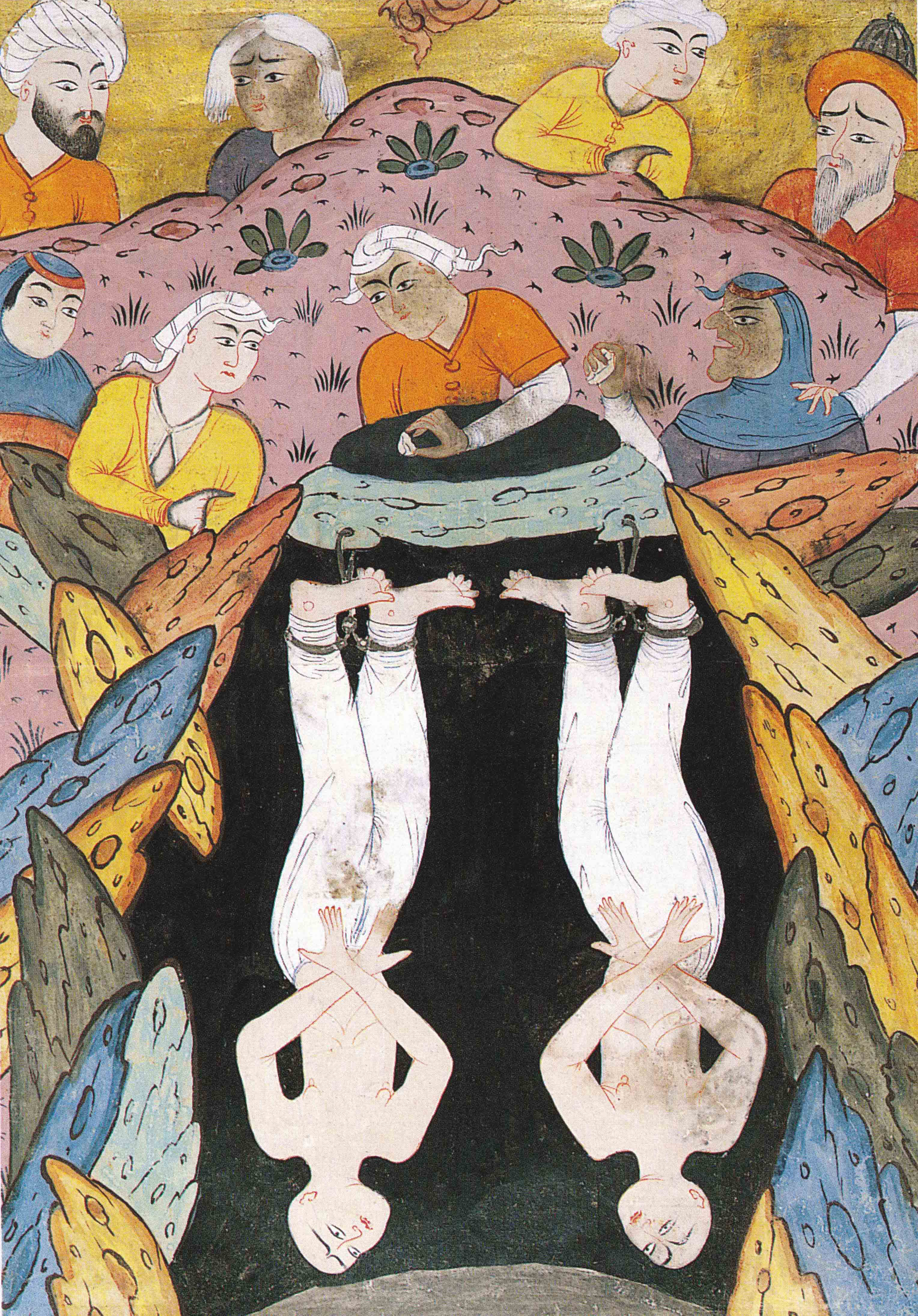
The angels Harut and Marut punished by hanging over the well, without wings and hair (c. 1703)

Harut and Marut are a pair of angels mentioned in Surah 2:102 teaching magic. The names Harut and Marut are of Zoroastrian origin and derived from two Amesha Spentas called Haurvatat and Ameretat. Although the Quran gave these fallen angels Iranian names, mufassirs recognized them as from the Book of Watchers. In accordance with 3 Enoch, al-Kalbi (737 AD – 819 AD) named three angels descending to earth, and he even gave them their Enochian names. He explained that one of them returned to heaven and the other two changed their names to Harut and Marut.

Although the Quran does not call this pair of angels fallen explicitly, the context assumes this to be true. The story bears resemblance to the Watchers, mentioned in Second Temple traditions and reflects an early Christian belief. Unlike in the Book of Watchers and Christian tradition, the story is not about angelic revolt or original sin, but the struggle of human beings. Unlike the Watchers, Harut and Marut instruct humans to witchcraft by God's command, just as Iblīs tempts humans only by God's permission. According to Muslim belief, the pair of angels expressed anger over the sinful nature of humans. Whereupon God challenged them to descend to earth and to do better. On earth, they committed various sins and were not allowed to return to heaven.

Those who deny fallen angels argue that Harut and Marut were merely two men, but credited with an angelic status due to their righteousness. This position found influential support among modern scholars, including al-Nibrawi (d. 1842), Muhammad Taqi ad-Din al-Hilali (d. 1987), and Muhammad Nasib al-Rifa (1915–1992) in his abridged commentary of Ibn Kathir.

== Esotericism ==
In Blavatsky's work "Secret Doctrine" the author combines many systems of thought such as parts of gnosticism, modern occultism and Eastern religions to create her own view of angels. In her system the Devil is the dark side of Jehovah and without this dark side Jehovah could not exist and shine so brightly. Jehovah created the earth through the angels, which are separated into three groups: the Self-created, the Self-existent, and the Fire-angels. The first two groups followed Jehovah's command but the third group, the Fire-angels rebelled and gave humans knowledge which in turn provided them with freedom. Mankind owes their freedom in Blavatsky's view to the Devil, who provided them with their wills and intellect.

== Literature and popular culture ==
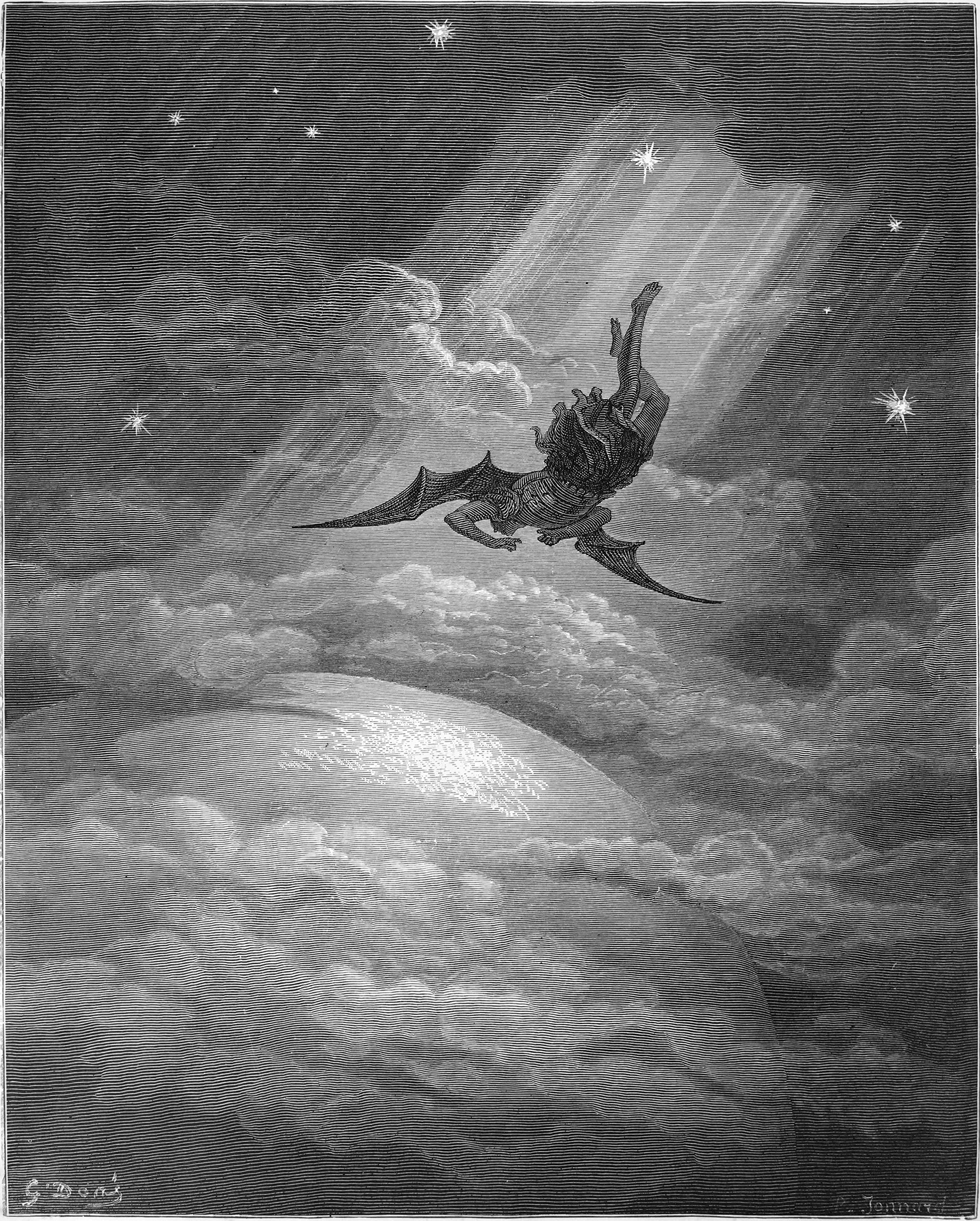
Lucifer being expelled from Heaven, depicting the "Fall of Lucifer". Illustration by Gustave Doré for John Milton's Paradise Lost (1866)

In the Divine Comedy (1308–1320) by Dante Alighieri, fallen angels guard the City of Dis surrounding the lower circles of hell. They mark a transition: while in previous circles, the sinners are condemned for sins they just could not resist, later on, the circles of hell are filled with sinners who deliberately rebel against God, such as fallen angels or Christian heretics.

In John Milton's 17th-century epic poem Paradise Lost, both obedient and fallen angels play an important role. They appear as rational individuals: their personality is similar to that of humans. The fallen angels are named after entities from both Christian and Pagan mythology, such as Moloch, Chemosh, Dagon, Belial, Beelzebub and Satan himself. Following the canonical Christian narrative, Satan convinces other angels to live free from the laws of God, thereupon they are cast out of heaven. The epic poem starts with the fallen angels in hell. The first portrayal of God in the book is given by fallen angels, who describe him as a questionable tyrant and blame him for their fall. Outcast from heaven, the fallen angels establish their own kingdom in the depths of hell, with a capital called Pandæmonium. Unlike most earlier Christian representations of hell, it is not the primary place for God to torture the sinners, but the fallen angels' own kingdom. The fallen angels even build a palace, play music and freely debate. Nevertheless, without divine guidance, the fallen angels themselves turn hell into a place of suffering.

The idea of fallen angels plays a significant role in the various poems of Alfred de Vigny. In Le Déluge (1823), the son of an angel and a mortal woman learns from the stars about the great deluge. He seeks refuge with his beloved on Mount Ararat, hoping that his angelic father will save them. But since he does not appear, they are caught by the flood. Éloa (1824) is about a female angel created by the tears of Jesus. She hears about a male angel, expelled from heaven, whereupon she seeks to comfort him, but goes to perdition as a consequence.

The Turkish horror film Semum (2008), produced and directed by Hasan Karacadağ, is about a shayṭān who has been summoned from hell to torment a woman named Canan. The movie is based on the Ibn Abbas interpretation of the Quran and depicts the devil as a fallen angel who seeks revenge on humans for being abandoned by God (Allah). The devil accepts ʿAzāzīl as his new deity, who is praised as the ruler of hell and supporting his minions against God's new creation (humans). However, at the end, the movie affirms in accordance with Islamic teachings, that ʿAzāzīl has no real power but only to seduce people to follow him. When the shayṭān battles a human priest (Hoca) in hell, it is God who intervenes on behalf of humanity while ʿAzāzīl has forsaken his servant. By that, the movie further rejects dualism in favor of Islamic tawḥīd, emphasizing that even hell is under God's control.

== See also ==
- Archon
- Devata
- List of angels in theology
- Meta-historical fall
- İye
- Nephilim
