= Azazel =

Biblical figure identified with fallen angel

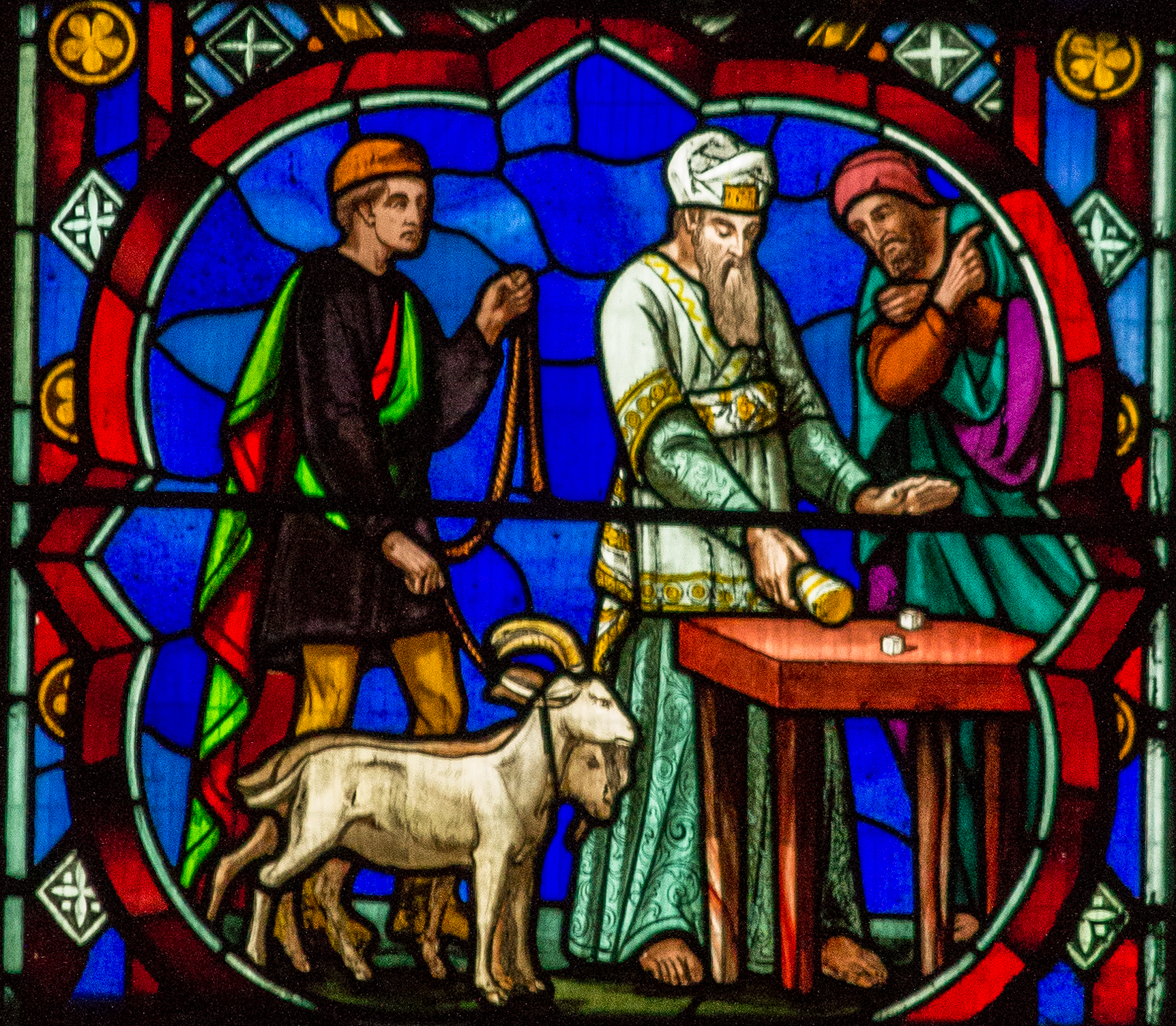
"And Aaron shall cast lots over the two goats, one lot for the LORD and the other lot for Azazel." Lincoln Cathedral

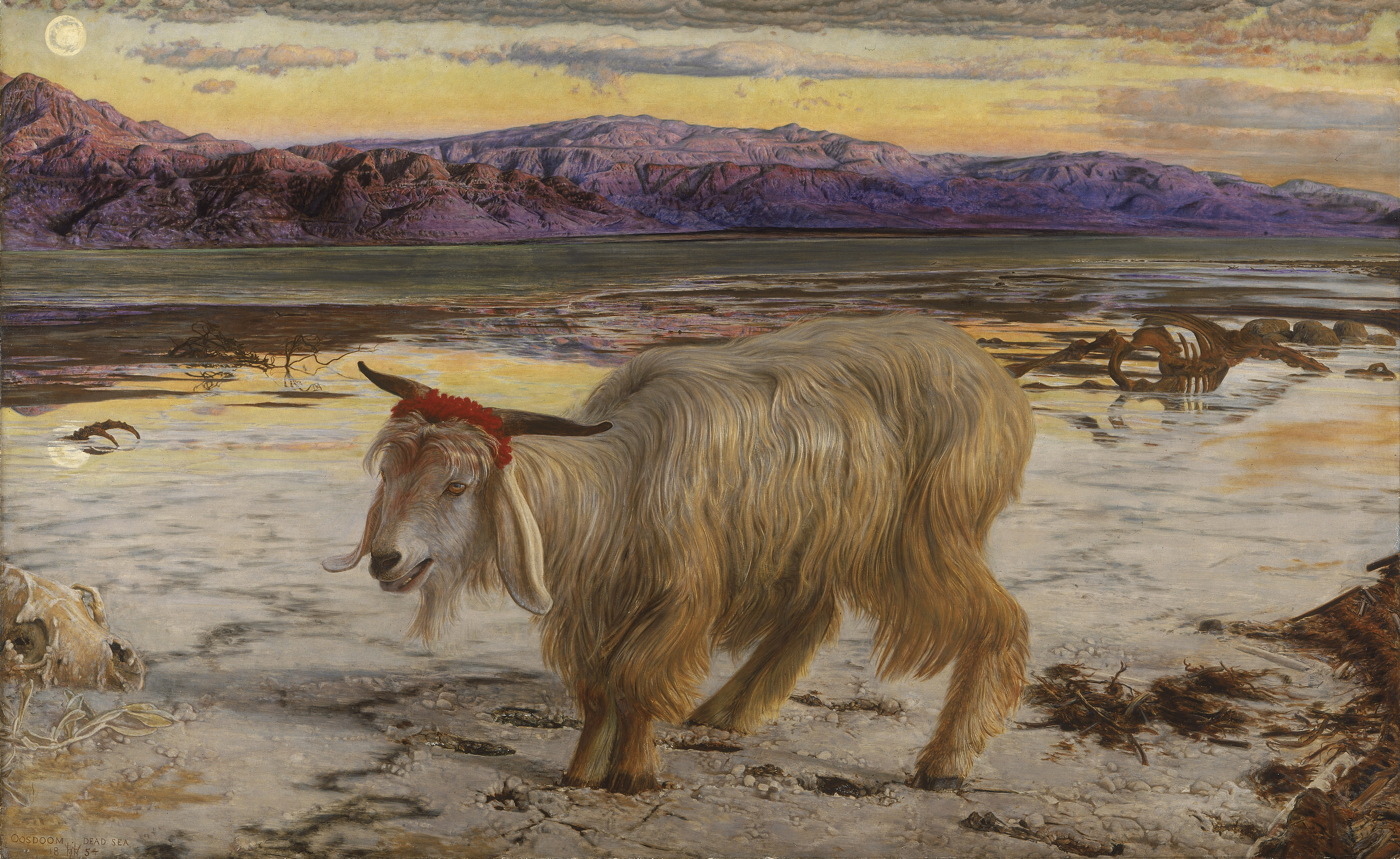
The Scapegoat, by William Holman Hunt, 1854

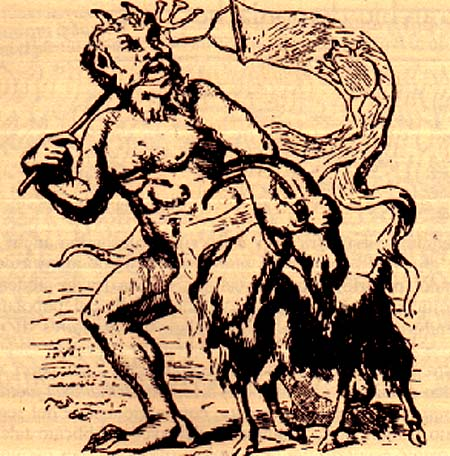
Illustration of Azazel in Dictionnaire infernal by Collin de Plancy (1863)

In the Hebrew Bible, the name Azazel (/əˈzeɪzəl, ˈæzəˌzɛl/; Hebrew: עֲזָאזֵל ʿĂzāʾzēl) represents a desolate place where a scapegoat bearing the sins of the Jews was sent during Yom Kippur. During the late Second Temple period (after the closure of the Hebrew Bible canon), Azazel came to be viewed as a fallen angel responsible for introducing humans to forbidden knowledge, as described in the Book of Enoch. His role as a fallen angel partly remains in Christian and Islamic traditions.

== Bible ==
=== Torah ===
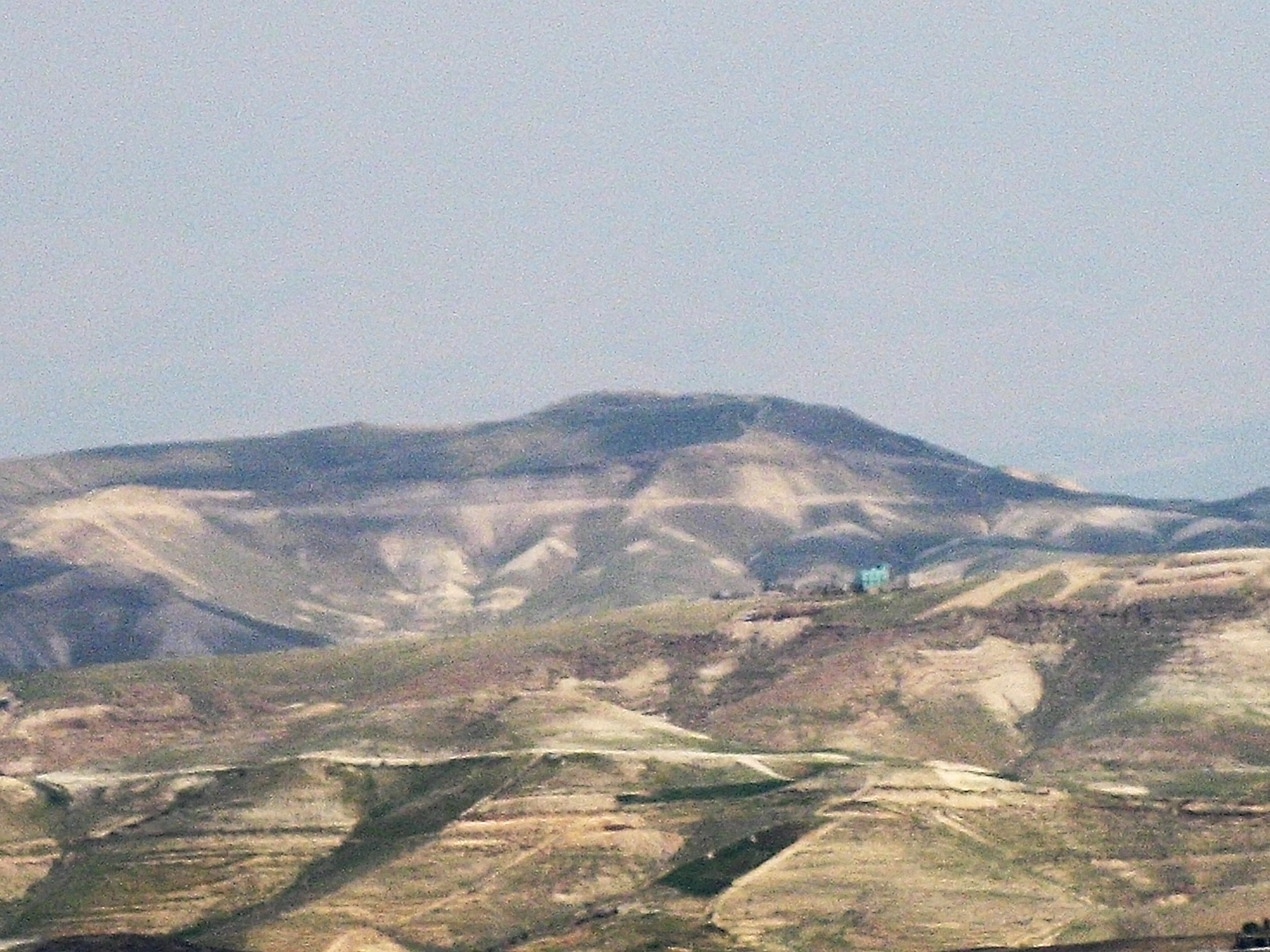
Mount Azazel (Jabel Munttar) in the Judean Desert

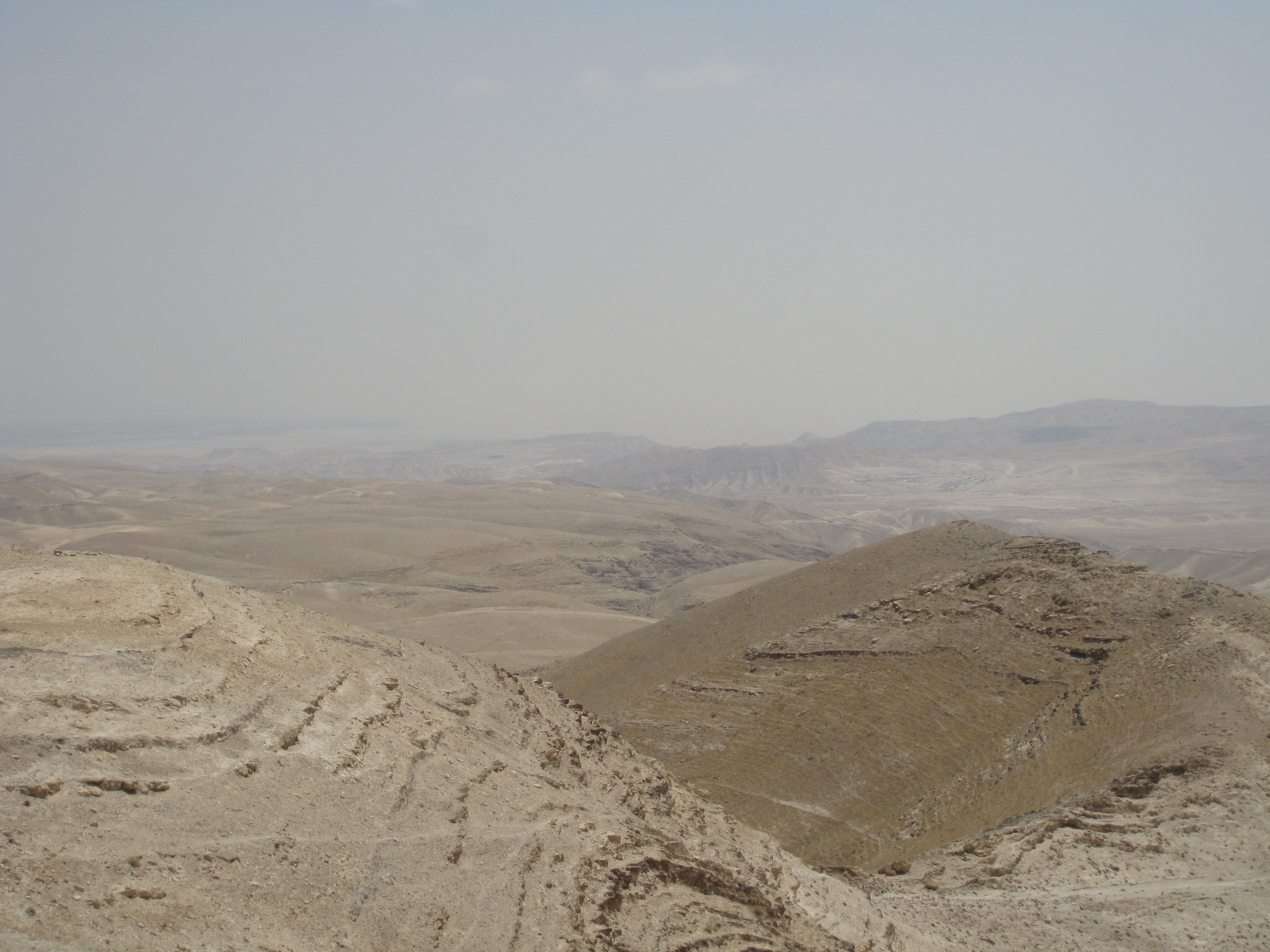
Cliffs of Mount Azazel (Jabel Munttar)

In the Hebrew Bible, the term is used three times in Chapter 16 of the Book of Leviticus, where two male goats were to be sacrificed to Yahweh and one of the two was selected by lot, for Yahweh is seen as speaking through the lots. One goat is selected by lot and sent into the wilderness לַעֲזָאזֵל, "for Azazel". This goat was then cast out in the desert as part of Yom Kippur. The scapegoat ritual can be traced back to 2400 BC Ebla, whence it spread throughout the ancient Near East.

The Tyndale Bible, a translation written c. 1530 by William Tyndale as the first English language translation of the Bible, he interpreted the verse regarding the goat sent to Azazel in Leviticus 16 as the "escapegoat", whose first letter was later omitted. In older English versions, such as the King James Version, the phrase la-azazel is translated "as a scapegoat"; however, in most modern English Bible translations, it is represented as a name in the text:

Aaron shall offer the bull as a sin offering for himself, and shall make atonement for himself and for his house. He shall take the two goats and set them before the Lord at the entrance of the tent of meeting; and Aaron shall cast lots on the two goats, one lot for the Lord and the other lot for Azazel. Aaron shall present the goat on which the lot fell for the Lord, and offer it as a sin offering; but the goat on which the lot fell for Azazel shall be presented alive before the Lord to make atonement over it, that it may be sent away into the wilderness to Azazel.

— Leviticus 16:6–10, New Revised Standard Version

A baraita, apparently interpreting ʿazazel as ʿaz (rugged) + El (God), understands it to refer to the rugged and rough mountain cliff from which the goat was cast down.

Wilhelm Gesenius translated the name עזלזל (note the extra lamed which leads to the transliteration ʿazalzel) as something akin to "the averter", which he supposed to have first referred to an idol, before being lent to a demon in the Enochian texts. However, neither this demon nor the root עזל are attested.

=== In the Septuagint and later translations ===
The translators of the Greek Septuagint understood the Hebrew term as meaning "the sent away" (apparently reading either עז אזל "goat that leaves" or "the mighty sent" or עזלזל v.s.), and rendered Leviticus 16:8-10 in the following terms:

^{8}and Aaron shall cast lots upon the two goats, one lot for the Lord and the other lot for the scapegoat (Greek τῷ ἀποπομπαίῳ tō̂i apopompaíōi dat.). ^{9}And Aaron shall present the goat on which the lot fell for the Lord, and offer it as a sin offering; ^{10}but the goat on which the lot of the sent away one fell shall be presented alive before the Lord to make atonement over it, that it may be sent away (Greek εἰς τὴν ἀποπομπήν eis tḕn apopompḗn acc.) into the wilderness.

Following the Septuagint, the Vulgate, Martin Luther and the King James Version also give readings such as Young's Literal Translation: "And Aaron hath given lots over the two goats, one lot for Jehovah, and one lot for a goat of departure'".

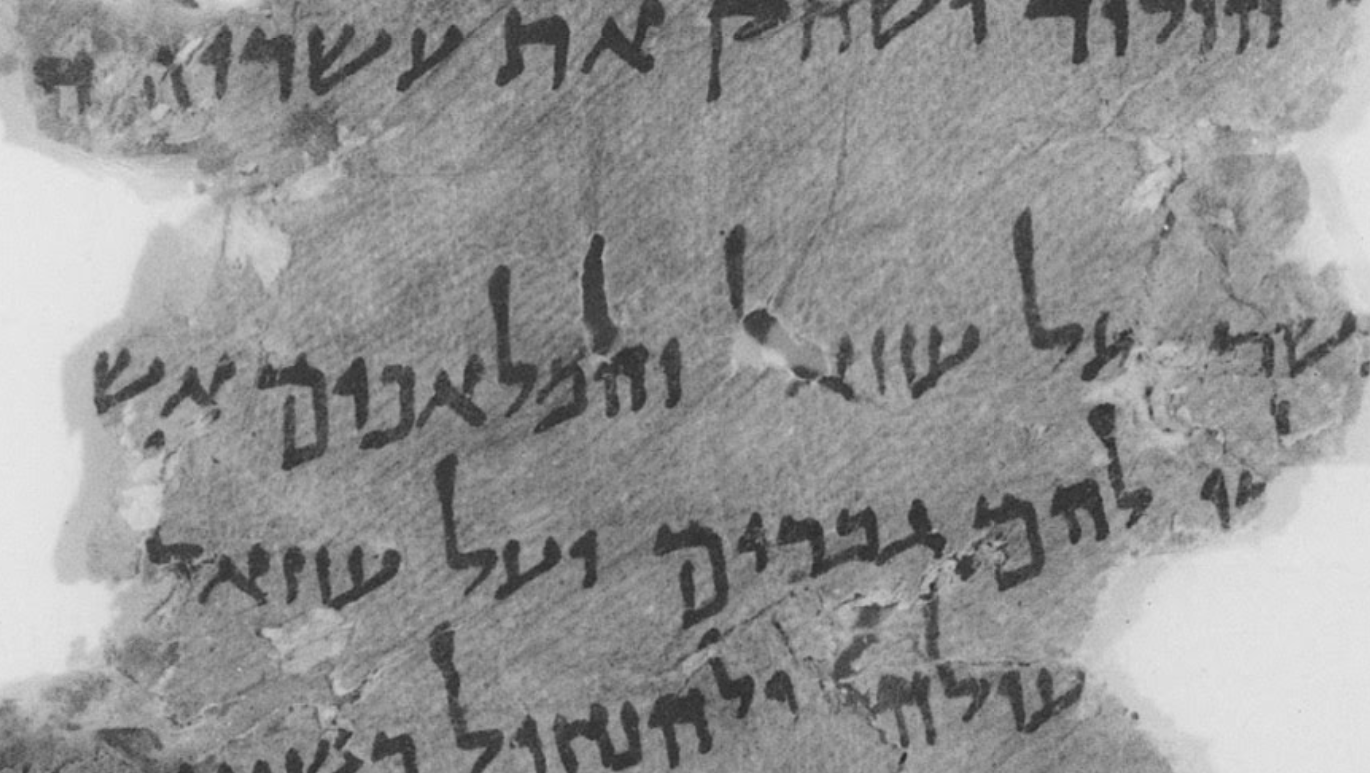
The Pesher on the Periods A (4Q180) possibly mentions Azazel

According to the Peshitta, Azazel is rendered Za-za-e'il "strong one against/of God" in Syriac. The Pesher on the Periods A (4Q180) reads, "on Azazel (some read Uzael) and the angels". If the name is in fact Azazel's, it is spelled עזזאל, equivalent to the Peshitta's version. The Targum Neofiti reads עזזל, without the aleph.

== In Judaism ==
=== Rabbinical Judaism ===
The Mishnah (Yoma 39a) follows the Hebrew Bible text; two goats were procured, similar in respect of appearance, height, cost, and time of selection. Having one of these on his right and the other on his left, the high priest, who was assisted in this rite by two subordinates, put both his hands into a wooden case, and took out two labels, one inscribed "for Yahweh" and the other "for Azazel". The high priest then laid his hands with the labels upon the two goats and said, "A sin-offering to Yahweh" (thus speaking the Tetragrammaton); and the two men accompanying him replied, "Blessed be the name of His glorious kingdom for ever and ever." He then fastened a scarlet woolen thread to the head of the goat "for Azazel"; and laying his hands upon it again, recited the following confession of sin and prayer for forgiveness: "O Lord, they have acted iniquitously, trespassed, sinned before Thee: Your people, the house of Israel. O Lord by Thy name, forgive the iniquities, transgressions, and sins that Thy people the house of Israel committed before Thee, as is written in the law of Moses, Thy servant, 'for on this day He will forgive you, to cleanse you from all your sins before the Lord; ye shall be clean.'"

This prayer was responded to by the congregation present. A man was selected, preferably a priest, to take the goat to the precipice in the wilderness; and he was accompanied part of the way by the most eminent men of Jerusalem. Ten booths had been constructed at intervals along the road leading from Jerusalem to the steep mountain. At each one of these the man leading the goat was formally offered food and drink, which he, however, refused. When he reached the tenth booth those who accompanied him proceeded no further, but watched the ceremony from a distance. When he came to the precipice he divided the scarlet thread into two parts, one of which he tied to the rock and the other to the goat's horns, and then pushed the goat down (Yoma 6:1–8). The cliff was so high and rugged that before the goat had traversed half the distance to the plain below, its limbs were utterly shattered. Men were stationed at intervals along the way, and as soon as the goat was thrown down the precipice, they signaled to one another by means of kerchiefs or flags, until the information reached the high priest, whereat he proceeded with the other parts of the ritual.

Isaiah 1.18 makes a symbolic allusion to the scarlet thread, and the Talmud states (ib. 39a) that during the forty years that Simeon the Just was High Priest of Israel the thread actually turned white as soon as the goat was thrown over the precipice. This was construed as a sign that the sins of the people were forgiven. In later times the change to white was not invariable: the absence of an observed change in color was taken as proof of the people's moral and spiritual deterioration, which gradually increased until forty years before the destruction of the Second Temple (l.c. 39b).

==== Medieval Jewish commentators ====
The medieval scholar Nachmanides (1194–1270) identified the Hebrew text as also referring to a demon, and identified this "Azazel" with Samael. However, he did not see the sending of the goat as honoring Azazel as a deity, but as a symbolic expression of the idea that the people's sins and their evil consequences were to be sent back to the spirit of desolation and ruin, the source of all impurity. The very fact that the two goats were presented before God, before the one was sacrificed and the other sent into the wilderness, was proof that Azazel was not ranked alongside God, but regarded simply as the personification of wickedness in contrast with the righteous government of God.

Maimonides (1134–1204) in his Guide for the Perplexed says that as sins cannot be taken off one's head and transferred elsewhere, the ritual is symbolic, enabling the penitent to discard his sins: "These ceremonies are of a symbolic character and serve to impress man with a certain idea and to lead him to repent, as if to say, 'We have freed ourselves of our previous deeds, cast them behind our backs and removed them from us as far as possible'."

The rite, resembling, on one hand, the sending off of the basket with the woman embodying wickedness to the land of Shinar in the vision of Zechariah (5:6–11), and, on the other, the letting loose of the living bird into the open field in the case of the leper healed from the plague (Lev 14:7), was, indeed, viewed by the people of Jerusalem as a means of ridding themselves of the sins of the year. So would the crowd, called Babylonians or Alexandrians, pull the goat's hair to make it hasten forth, carrying the burden of sins away with it (Yoma vi. 4, 66b; "Epistle of Barnabas", vii), and the arrival of the shattered animal at the bottom of the valley of the rock of Bet Ḥadudo, twelve miles away from the city, was signalized by the waving of shawls to the people of Jerusalem, who celebrated the event with boisterous hilarity and amid dancing on the hills (Yoma vi. 6, 8; Ta'an. iv. 8). Evidently the figure of Azazel was an object of general fear and awe rather than, as has been conjectured, a foreign product or the invention of a late lawgiver. More as a demon of the desert, it seems to have been closely interwoven with the mountainous region of Jerusalem.

== In Christianity ==
=== Latin Bible ===
The Vulgate contains no mention of "Azazel" but only of caper emissarius, or "emissary goat", apparently reading עז אזל goat which leaves:

8 mittens super utrumque sortem unam Domino et alteram capro emissario 9 cuius sors exierit Domino offeret illum pro peccato 10 cuius autem in caprum emissarium statuet eum vivum coram Domino ut fundat preces super eo et emittat illum in solitudinem

— Latin Vulgate, Leviticus 16:8–10

English versions, such as the King James Version, followed the Septuagint and Vulgate in understanding the term as relating to a goat. The modern English Standard Version provides the footnote "16:8 The meaning of Azazel is uncertain; possibly the name of a place or a demon, traditionally a scapegoat; also verses 10, 26". Most scholars accept the indication of some kind of demon or deity, however Judit M. Blair notes that this is an argument without supporting contemporary text evidence.

Ida Zatelli (1998) has suggested that the Hebrew ritual parallels pagan practice of sending a scapegoat into the desert on the occasion of a royal wedding found in two ritual texts in archives at Ebla (24th C. BC). A she-goat with a silver bracelet hung from her neck was driven forth into the wasteland of 'Alini' by the community. There is no mention of an "Azazel".

According to The Expositor's Bible Commentary, Azazel is the Hebrew word for scapegoat. This is the only place that the Hebrew word is found in the whole Hebrew Old Testament. It says that the Book of Enoch, (extra-biblical Jewish theological literature, dated around 200 B.C.) is full of demonology and reference to fallen angels. The EBC (Vol 2) says that this text uses late Aramaic forms for these names which indicates that The Book of Enoch most likely relies upon the Hebrew Leviticus text rather than the Leviticus text being reliant upon the Book of Enoch.

=== Christian commentators ===
Origen ("Contra Celsum", vi. 43) identifies Azazel with Satan.

== In Mandaeism ==
Azazel is occasionally mentioned as Azaziʿil in Mandaean texts. In the Right Ginza, Azaziʿil is the name of an uthra (celestial being or angel).

== In Islam ==
In Islam, Azazel appears in relation to the story of Harut and Marut, a pair of angels mentioned in the Quran. Although not explained by the Quran itself, Muslim exegetes such as Hisham ibn al-Kalbi and Abu Ishaq al-Tha'labi usually linked the reason of their abode to a narration related to the Watchers known from 3 Enoch. Just as in 3 Enoch, angels complained about humans iniquity, whereupon God offered a test, that the angels might choose three among them to descend to earth, endowed with bodily desires, and prove that they would do better than humans under the same conditions. Accordingly, they choose Aza, Azzaya and Azazel. However, Azazel repented his decision and God allowed him to turn back to heaven. The other two angels failed the test and their names were changed to Harut and Marut. They ended up on earth, introducing men to illicit magic.

== Biblical Apocrypha ==
In the first book of Enoch, Azazel is portrayed as one of the two hundred angels who, after descending to Earth in lust for human women, resided on Mount Hermon and fathered the giants, sometimes identified with Nephilim, prior to the Flood. Afterwards he corrupted humanity — by the reckoning of the author — by teaching men the art of crafting metal weapons and armour and women the means of beautifying themselves with hair dyes, face paints, and other cosmetics. His defeat came at the hand of Raphael who, on God's command, chained him to jagged rocks where he was to remain until the Day of Judgement. However, Jubilees 4:15 has an interpretation closer to Islam or Judaism.

=== Enochic literature ===
In the Dead Sea Scrolls, the name Azazel occurs in the line 6 of 4Q203, The Book of Giants, which is a part of the Enochic literature found at Qumran. Despite the expectation of Brandt (1889) to date no evidence has surfaced of Azazel as a demon or god prior to the earliest Jewish sources among the Dead Sea Scrolls.

The Book of Enoch brings Azazel into connection with the Biblical story of the fall of the angels, located on Mount Hermon, a gathering-place of the demons of old. Here, Azazel is one of the leaders of the rebellious Watchers in the time preceding the Flood; he taught men the art of warfare, of making swords, knives, shields, and coats of mail, and taught women the art of deception by ornamenting the body, dyeing the hair, and painting the face and the eyebrows, and also revealed to the people the secrets of witchcraft and corrupted their manners, leading them into wickedness and impurity until at last he was, at Yahweh's command, bound hand and foot by the archangel Raphael and chained to the rough and jagged rocks of [Ha] Dudael (= Beth Ḥadudo), where he is to abide in utter darkness until the great Day of Judgment, when he will be cast into the fire to be consumed forever.

The whole earth has been corrupted through the works that were taught by Azazel: to him ascribe all sin.

— Book of Enoch 10:8

According to the Book of Enoch, Azazel (here spelled ‘ăzā’zyēl) was one of the chief Grigori, a group of fallen angels who married women. Many believe that this same story (without any mention of Azazel) is told in the Book of Genesis 6:2–4:

And it came to pass [...] that the sons of God saw the daughters of men that they were fair; and they took them wives of all which they chose. [...] There were giants in the earth in those days; and also afterward, when the sons of God came in unto the daughters of men, and they bore children to them, the same became mighty men which were of old, men of renown.

These "sons of God" have often been thought of as fallen angels, and are sometimes equated with the Nephilim. (On the other hand, it has also been argued that the phrase refers only to pious men, or else that it should be translated "sons of the rulers".)

In the Book of Enoch, Azazel is responsible for teaching people to make weapons and cosmetics, for which he was cast out of heaven. The Book of Enoch 8:1–3a reads, "And Azazel taught men to make swords and knives and shields and breastplates; and made known to them the metals [of the earth] and the art of working them; and bracelets and ornaments; and the use of antimony and the beautifying of the eyelids; and all kinds of costly stones and all colouring tinctures. And there arose much godlessness, and they committed fornication, and they were led astray and became corrupt in all their ways." The corruption brought on by Azazel and the Grigori degrades the human race, and the four archangels (Michael, Gabriel, Raphael, and Uriel) "saw much blood being shed upon the earth and all lawlessness being wrought upon the earth [...] The souls of men [made] their suit, saying, 'Bring our cause before the Most High; [...] Thou seest what Azazel hath done, who hath taught all unrighteousness on earth and revealed the eternal secrets which were in heaven, which men were striving to learn.'" God sees the sin brought about by Azazel and has Raphael "bind Azazel hand and foot and cast him into the darkness: and make an opening in the desert – which is in Dudael – and cast him therein. And place upon him rough and jagged rocks, and cover him with darkness, and let him abide there forever, and cover his face that he may not see light." Azazel's fate is foretold near the end of Enoch 2:8, where God says, "On the day of the great judgement he shall be cast into the fire." He will be delivered to the angels of punishments (Satan).

Several scholars have previously discerned that some details of Azazel's punishment are reminiscent of the scapegoat rite. Thus, Lester Grabbe points to a number of parallels between the Azazel narrative in Enoch and the wording of Leviticus 16, including "the similarity of the names Asael and Azazel; the punishment in the desert; the placing of sin on Asael/Azazel; the resultant healing of the land". Daniel Stökl also observes that "the punishment of the demon resembles the treatment of the goat in aspects of geography, action, time and purpose." Thus, the place of Asael's punishment designated in Enoch as Dudael is reminiscent of the rabbinic terminology used for the designation of the ravine of the scapegoat in later rabbinic interpretations of the Yom Kippur ritual. Stökl remarks that "the name of place of judgment (Dudael) is conspicuously similar in both traditions and can likely be traced to a common origin."

Azazel in 1 Enoch has been compared to Greek Titan Prometheus. He might be a demonized counterpart of a heavenly creature, who provided knowledge for people to make weapons, thus causing bloodshed and injustice. The latter might be identified with Greek kings and generals, who suppressed the Jews with military forces, but learned how to make their weapons by this specific expelled creature.

In the fifth-century 3 Enoch, Azazel is one of the three angels (Azza [Shemhazai] and Uzza [Ouza] are the other two) who opposed Enoch's high rank when he became the angel Metatron. Whilst they were fallen at this time they were still in Heaven, but Metatron held a dislike for them, and had them cast out.

=== In the Apocalypse of Abraham ===
In the extra-canonical text the Apocalypse of Abraham (1st century CE), Azazel appears as an unclean bird who came down upon the sacrifice which Abraham prepared. (This is in reference to Genesis 15:11: "Birds of prey came down on the carcasses, but Abram drove them away" [NIV]).

And the unclean bird spoke to me and said, "What are you doing, Abraham, on the holy heights, where no one eats or drinks, nor is there upon them food for men? But these all will be consumed by fire and ascend to the heights, they will destroy you. Forsake the man who is with you and flee; for if you ascend to the heights they will make an end of you." And it came to pass when I saw the bird speaking I said this to the angel: "What is this, my lord?" And he said, "This is disgrace – this is Azazel!" And he said to him, "Shame on you, Azazel! For Abraham's portion is in heaven, and yours is on earth, for you have selected here, [and] become enamored of the dwelling place of your blemish. Therefore the Eternal Ruler, the Mighty One, has given you a dwelling on earth. Through you the all-evil spirit [was] a liar, and through you [come] wrath and trials on the generations of men who live impiously.

— Abraham 13:4–9

The text also associates Azazel with the serpent and hell. In Chapter 23, verse 7, it is described as having seven heads, fourteen faces, "hands and feet like a man's, [and] on his back six wings on the right and six on the left".

Abraham elsewhere says that the wicked will "putrefy in the belly of the crafty worm Azazel, and be burned by the fire of Azazel's tongue" (Abraham 31:5) and, to Azazel himself, "May you be the firebrand of the furnace of the earth! Go, Azazel, into the untrodden parts of the earth. For your heritage is over those who are with you" (Abraham 14:5–6).

The implicit notion is that God's heritage (the created world) is largely under the dominion of evil – i.e., it is "shared with Azazel" (Abraham 20:5), who is arguably identified with the devil (whom Jesus called "the prince of this world"). (John 12:31 NIV)

== See also ==
- Azazel in popular culture
- Baphomet
- Capricorn (astrology)
- Dudael
- Enki
- List of angels in theology
- Lucifer
- The Master and Margarita
- Samael
- Samyaza
- Scapegoating
- Watcher (angel)
- Zazel (spirit)
- Fallen (1998 film)
