= Futrus =

Fallen angel in Islamic legend

Fuṭrus (فطرس) is a fallen angel mentioned in legends concerning Ali ibn al-Husayn. It is said God's watch lies upon him, after he dawdled too long to fulfill an order by God. His wings were broken off and he was cast on an island for punishment.

According to legend, the Islamic prophet Muhammad and angel Gabriel met Fuṭrus on their way to the new born al-Husayn. Muhammad interceded for the fallen angel, and he accompanied Muhammad and Gabriel to al-Husayn. When he touches al-Husayn's cradle, forgiveness is accepted and his wings are restored. He then returns with Gabriel to heaven.

In the story of the Battle of Karbala, Husayn is offered an army of angels by the restored Fuṭrus. However, Husayn rejects the offer (just as he refused the aid of jinn by Zaʿfar), since he does not want to rely on supernatural help.
