= Dudael =

Underworld

Dudael (Heb. דּוּדָאֵל, compd. of dud דּוּד "kettle", "cauldron", "pot" + El אֵל "deity", "divinity" — lit. "cauldron of God") is the place of imprisonment for Azazel (one of the fallen angels), cohort of Samyaza. It is described in the Book of Enoch chapter 10 verses 4–7:

And again the Lord said to Raphael: 'Bind Azazel hand and foot, and cast him into the darkness: and make an opening in the desert, which is in Dudael, and cast him therein. And place upon him rough and jagged rocks, and cover him with darkness, and let him abide there for ever, and cover his face that he may not see light. And on the day of the great judgement, he shall be cast into the fire.

Dudael is also implied to be the prison of all the fallen angels, especially the evil Watchers, the entrance of which is located to the east of Jerusalem. The way this place is described, Dudael is sometimes considered as a region of the underworld, comparable to Tartarus or Gehenna.

== See also ==
- Christian views on Hades
- Hell
- Intermediate state
- Lake of fire
- Revelation 20
- Sheol

== Bibliography ==
- Bautch, K. C. (2003). A Study of the Geography of 1 Enoch 17-19: No One Has Seen What I Have Seen. Leiden: Brill.
