= Forbidden knowledge =

Knowledge secret societies use for membership

Forbidden knowledge is information, sometimes in the form of forbidden books, to which access is restricted or deprecated for political or religious reasons. It differs from secret knowledge in that forbidden knowledge is commonly not secret, rather a society or various institutions will use repressive mechanisms to either completely prevent the publication of information they find objectionable or dangerous (censorship), or failing that, to try to reduce the public's trust in such information (propaganda). Public repression can create paradoxical situations where the proscribed information is generally common knowledge but publicly citing it is disallowed.

== Background ==
A rich set of examples exist through history.

- The Roman Catholic church forbids publication of books to which it has not granted Imprimatur.
- Throughout the years of isolation in Japan and China all Western literature was forbidden.
- Certain 20th century governments (e.g. communist nations in Eastern Europe and China) placed strong restrictions on foreign publications.
- In the United States, conservative groups including Jerry Falwell's Moral Majority made several attempts to censor pro civil-rights and feminist works such as Our Bodies, Ourselves.

In many cases this resulted in people defending themselves by creating political jokes. Jokes throughout history have been a powerful instrument to undermine state authority and the public truth associated with it.

Scientific results can be ethically controversial because of their potential profound effect on society. Examples include laboratory-grown brain tissue that developed spontaneous brain waves, raising concerns about possible sentience. Controversy has also followed claims of a link between fluoride exposure and IQ scores in children. These cases illustrate how findings can shape public debate and activist causes. The question arises whether some scientific topics should be off-limits owing to ethical concerns, a problem described as "forbidden knowledge". Issues include both experimental methods, such as human experimentation, and the societal impact of dissemination of certain findings.

== Sociological and political relevance ==
Some form of public repression of facts or speculation not desirable to some people or even a majority of the population seems inevitable as societies need to create some common basis of facts to create a unified identity. Critical to political and personal freedom is the level to which this repression is organized through the state or powerful private organizations. Western secular societies have reached the consensus through the late 19th and early 20th centuries that private organizations should not be allowed to engage in compulsory censorship, forcing people to obey their dictates. For example, the separation of church and state in most Western societies mostly prevents religious organizations from repressing individuals based on their personal opinions and beliefs. As well, people are generally allowed to leave employment with a company which may regulate such personal expressions for whatever reason and find employment in less restrictive circumstances.

Studies on gender differences in mathematics have been criticized for reinforcing stereotypes and potentially discouraging women from science careers. Philosophers such as Helen Longino argue such research may affect social policy and priorities. Janet Kourany has argued scientists have moral responsibilities to conduct research according to egalitarian standards. She suggests avoiding biological explanations for group differences unless social explanations fail empirically. Otherwise, stereotypes may persist in society even as they are disproved within science.

Philosopher Philip Kitcher warns of "cognitive asymmetry", where stereotypes require little evidence to maintain but much to dispel. Banning certain research risks reinforcing prejudice by appearing to conceal uncomfortable truths. Opponents of such bans may present themselves as martyrs, likening restrictions to Galileo's persecution. Attempts to forbid research can increase attention to controversial topics and shift work to countries with looser ethics rules. Debates over forbidden knowledge highlight the tension between freedom of inquiry, ethical responsibility, and social harm.
