= Satan =

Figure in Abrahamic religions

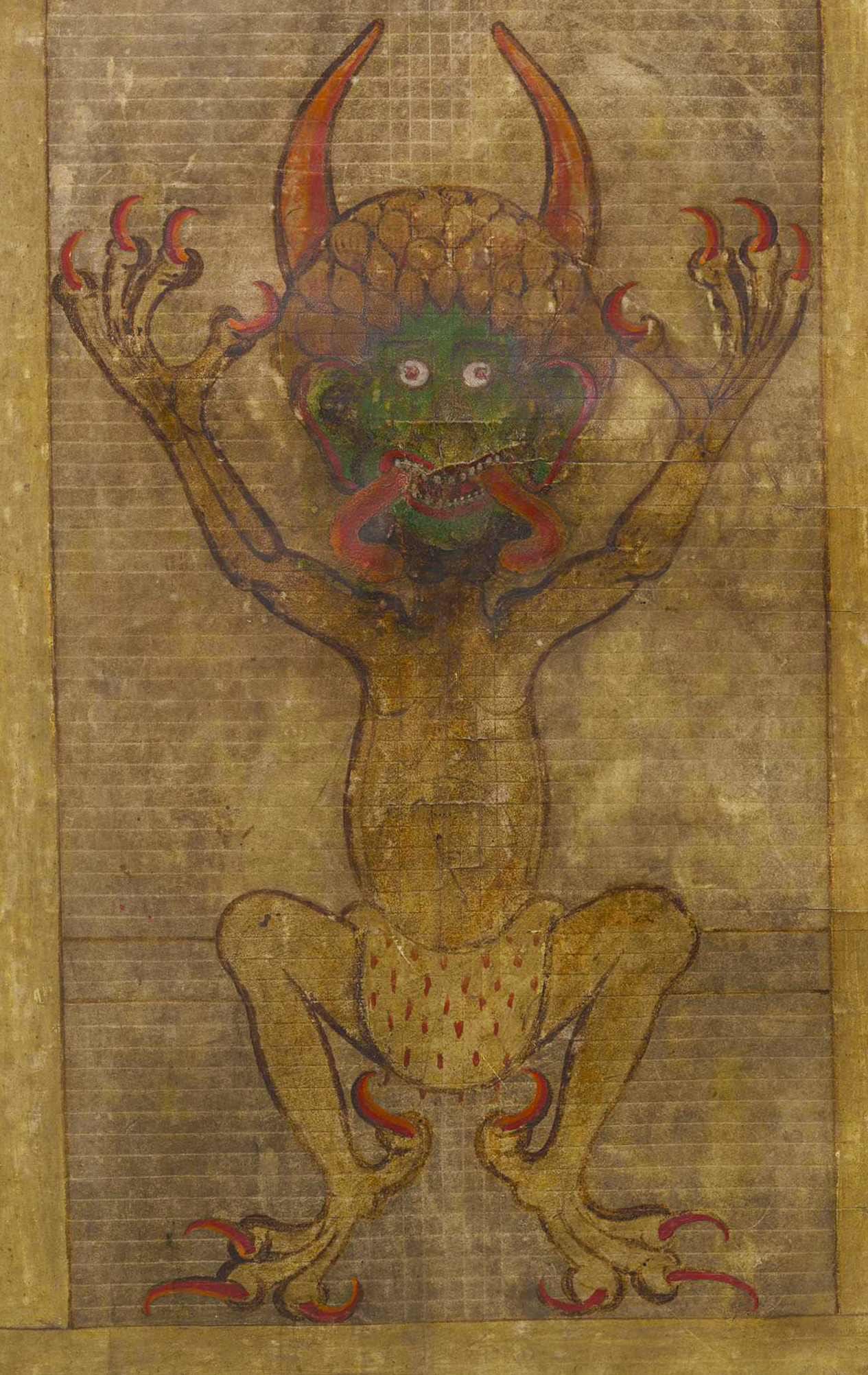
Illustration of the Devil on Codex Gigas, early thirteenth century

Satan, (Note: Hebrew: שָּׂטָן, romanized: sāṭān, lit. 'adversary'; Ancient Greek: ὁ σατανᾶς or σατάν, ho satanas/satan; Arabic: الشَّيطان ash-shayṭān, lit. 'astray', 'distant', or sometimes 'devil') also known as the Devil, (Note: In many cases, the translators of the Septuagint, the pre-Christian translation of the Hebrew Bible into ancient Greek, chose to render the Hebrew word sâtan as the Greek word διάβολος (diábolos), meaning "opponent" or "accuser". This is the root of the modern English word Devil. Both the words satanas and diábolos are used interchangeably in the New Testament and in later Christian writings. The Pauline epistles and the Gospel of Mark both use the word satanas more frequently than diábolos, but the Gospel of Matthew uses the word diábolos more frequently and so do the Church Fathers Justin Martyr, Irenaeus, and Origen.) is a malevolent entity in Abrahamic religions who entices humans into sin or falsehood. In Judaism, Satan is seen as an agent subservient to God, typically regarded as a metaphor for the yetzer hara, or 'evil inclination'. In Christianity and Islam, he is usually seen as a fallen angel or jinn who has rebelled against God, who nevertheless allows him temporary power over the fallen world and a host of demons.

A figure known as ha-satan ("the satan") first appears in the Hebrew Bible as a heavenly prosecutor, subordinate to Yahweh (God); he prosecutes the nation of Judah in the heavenly court and tests the loyalty of Yahweh's followers. During the intertestamental period, possibly due to influence from the Zoroastrian figure of Angra Mainyu, the satan developed into a malevolent entity with abhorrent qualities in dualistic opposition to God. In the apocryphal Book of Jubilees, Yahweh grants the satan (referred to as Mastema) authority over a group of fallen angels, or their offspring, to tempt humans to sin and punish them.

Although the Book of Genesis does not name him specifically, Christians often identify the serpent in the Garden of Eden as Satan. In the Synoptic Gospels, Satan tempts Jesus in the desert and is identified as the cause of illness and temptation. In the Book of Revelation, Satan appears as a Great Red Dragon, who is defeated by Michael the Archangel and cast down from Heaven. He is later bound for one thousand years, but is briefly set free before being ultimately defeated and cast into the Lake of Fire.

In the Quran, Iblis (Shaitan), the leader of the devils (shayāṭīn), is made of fire and was cast out of Heaven because he refused to bow before the newly created Adam. He incites humans to sin by infecting their minds with waswās ('evil suggestions').

In the Middle Ages, Satan played a minimal role in Christian theology and was used as a comic relief figure in mystery plays. During the early modern period, Satan's significance greatly increased as beliefs such as demonic possession and witchcraft became more prevalent. During the Age of Enlightenment, belief in the existence of Satan was harshly criticized by thinkers such as Voltaire. Nonetheless, belief in Satan has persisted, particularly in the Americas.

Although Satan is generally viewed as evil, some groups have very different beliefs. In theistic Satanism, Satan is considered a deity who is either worshipped or revered. In LaVeyan Satanism, Satan is a symbol of virtuous characteristics and liberty. Satan's appearance is never described in the Bible, but, since the ninth century, he has often been shown in Christian art with horns, cloven hooves, unusually hairy legs, and a tail, often naked and holding a pitchfork. These are an amalgam of traits derived from various pagan deities, including Pan, Poseidon, and Bes. Satan appears frequently in Christian literature, most notably in Dante Alighieri's Inferno, all variants of the classic Faust story, John Milton's Paradise Lost and Paradise Regained, and the poems of William Blake.

== Historical development ==
=== Hebrew Bible ===
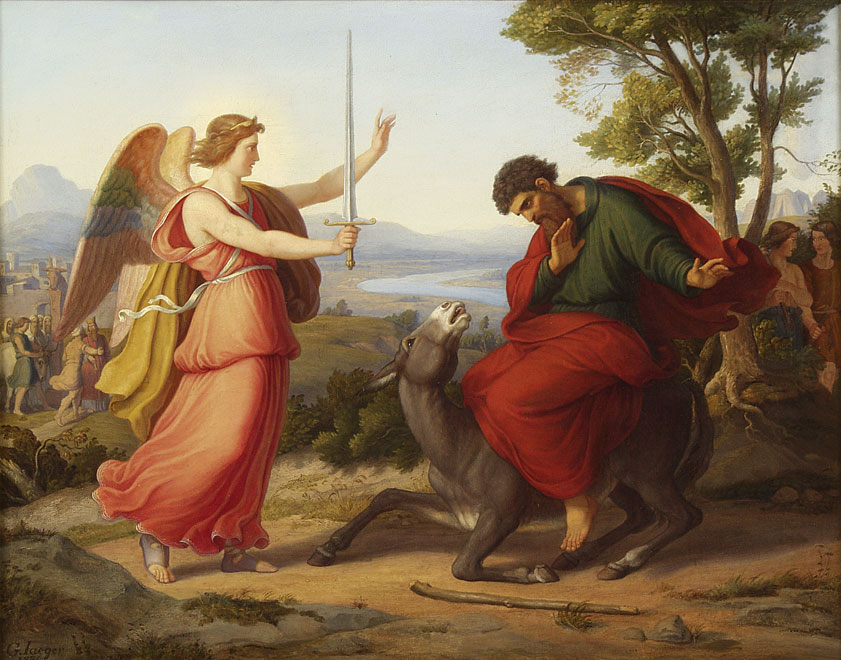
Balaam and the Angel (1836) by Gustav Jäger. The angel in this incident is referred to as a "satan".

The Hebrew term śāṭān (Hebrew: שָׂטָן) is a generic noun meaning "accuser" or "adversary", and is derived from a verb meaning primarily "to obstruct, oppose". In the earlier biblical books, e.g. 1 Samuel 29:4, the term refers to human adversaries, but in the later books, especially Job 1–2 and Zechariah 3, to a supernatural entity. When used without the definite article (simply satan), it can refer to any accuser, but when it is used with the definite article (ha-satan), it usually refers specifically to the heavenly accuser, literally, the satan.

The word with the definite article Ha-Satan (Hebrew: הַשָּׂטָן hasSāṭān) occurs 17 times in the Masoretic Text, in two books of the Hebrew Bible: Job ch. 1–2 (14×) and Zechariah 3:1–2 (3×). It is translated in English bibles mostly as 'Satan'.

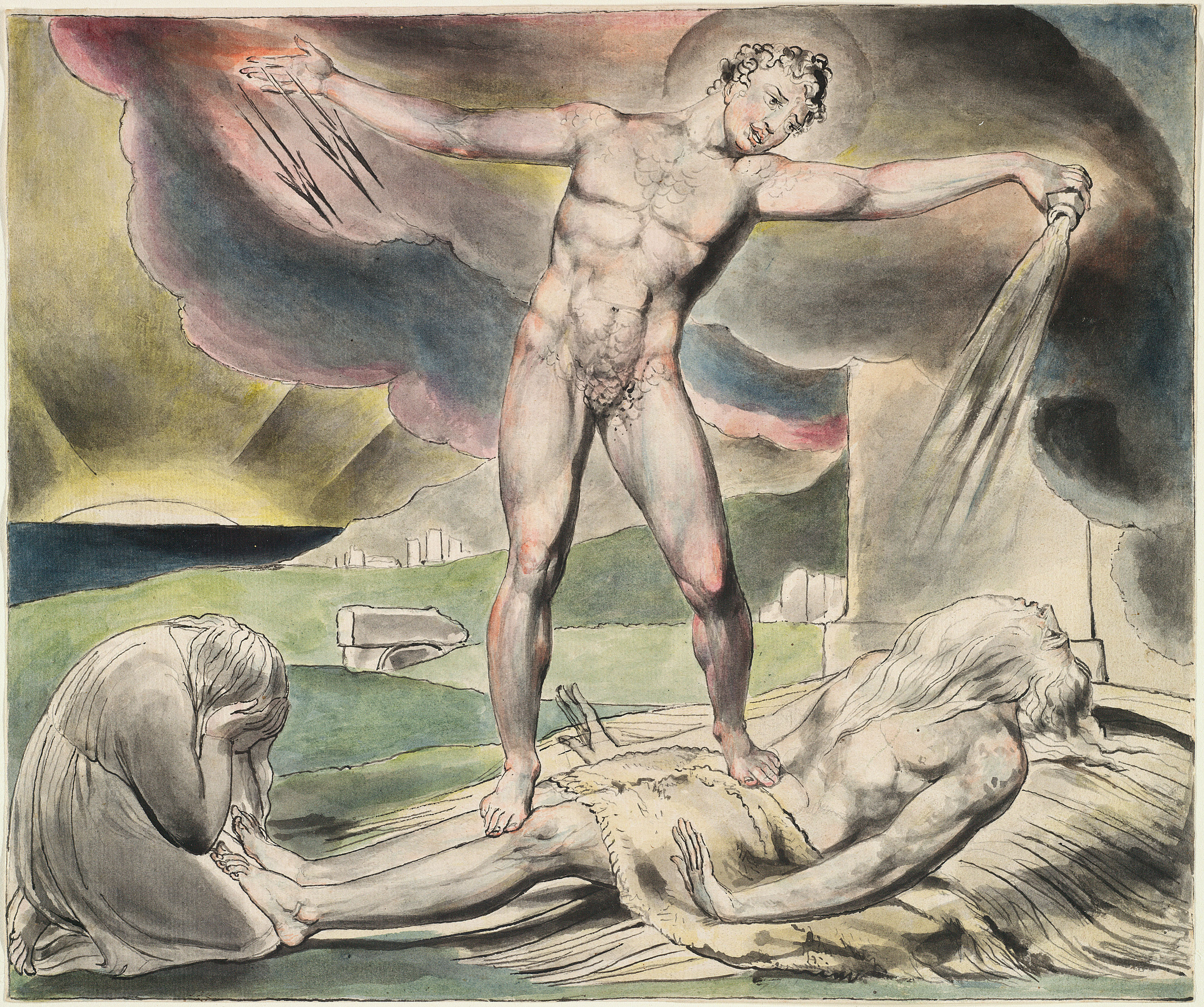
The Examination of Job (c. 1821) by William Blake

The word does not occur in the Book of Genesis, which mentions only a talking serpent and does not identify the serpent with any supernatural entity. The first occurrence of the word "satan" in the Hebrew Bible in reference to a supernatural figure comes from Numbers 22:22, which describes the Angel of Yahweh confronting Balaam on his donkey: "Balaam's departure aroused the wrath of Elohim, and the Angel of Yahweh stood in the road as a satan against him." In 2 Samuel 24 Yahweh sends the "Angel of Yahweh" to inflict a plague against Israel for three days, killing 70,000 people as punishment for David having taken a census without his approval. 1 Chronicles 21:1 repeats this story, but replaces the "Angel of Yahweh" with an entity referred to as "a satan".

Some passages may refer to the satan, without using the word itself. 1 Samuel 2:12 describes the sons of Eli as "sons of Belial"; the name "Belial" may be a synonym for "satan", although elsewhere in the Bible "belial" is a word meaning "worthlessness" and the phrase "sons of belial" is translated as "worthless fellows". In 1 Samuel 16:14–23 Yahweh sends a "troubling spirit" to torment King Saul as a mechanism to ingratiate David with the king. In 1 Kings 22:19–25 the prophet Micaiah describes to King Ahab a vision of Yahweh sitting on his throne surrounded by the Host of Heaven. Yahweh asks the Host which of them will lead Ahab astray. A "spirit", whose name is not specified, but who is analogous to the satan, volunteers to be "a Lying Spirit in the mouth of all his Prophets".

==== Book of Job ====
The satan appears in the Book of Job, a poetic dialogue set within a prose framework, which may have been written around the time of the Babylonian captivity. In the text, Job is a righteous man favored by Yahweh. Job 1:6–8 describes the "sons of God" (bənê hāʼĕlōhîm) presenting themselves before Yahweh. Yahweh asks one of them, "the satan", where he has been, to which he replies that he has been roaming around the earth. Yahweh asks, "Have you considered My servant Job?" The satan replies by urging Yahweh to let him torture Job, promising that Job will abandon his faith at the first tribulation. Yahweh consents: the satan destroys Job's servants and flocks, yet Job refuses to condemn Yahweh. The first scene repeats itself, with the satan presenting himself to Yahweh alongside the other "sons of God". Yahweh points out Job's continued faithfulness, to which the satan insists that more testing is necessary; Yahweh once again gives him permission to test Job. In the end, Job remains faithful and righteous, and it is implied that the satan is shamed in his defeat.

==== Book of Zechariah ====
Zechariah 3:1–7 contains a description of a vision dated to the middle of February of 519 BC, in which an angel shows Zechariah a scene of Joshua the High Priest dressed in filthy rags, representing the nation of Judah and its sins, on trial with Yahweh as the judge and the satan standing as the prosecutor. Yahweh rebukes the satan and orders for Joshua to be given clean clothes, representing Yahweh's forgiveness of Judah's sins.

=== Second Temple period ===
Map showing the expansion of the Achaemenid Empire, in which Jews lived during the early Second Temple Period, allowing Zoroastrian ideas about Angra Mainyu to influence the Jewish conception of Satan

For much of Second Temple Period Jews lived under the Achaemenid Empire, providing the opportunity for Jews to be influenced by Zoroastrianism, the religion of the Achaemenids. Jewish conceptions of Satan were impacted by Angra Mainyu, the Zoroastrian spirit of evil, darkness, and ignorance. In the Septuagint, the Hebrew ha-Satan in Job and Zechariah is translated by the Greek word diabolos (slanderer), the same word in the Greek New Testament from which the English word "devil" is derived. Where satan is used to refer to human enemies in the Hebrew Bible, such as Hadad the Edomite and Rezon the Syrian, the word is left untranslated but is instead transliterated in the Greek as satan, a neologism in Greek.

The idea of Satan as an opponent of God and a purely evil figure seems to have taken root in Jewish pseudepigrapha during the Second Temple Period, particularly in the apocalypses. The Book of Enoch, which the Dead Sea Scrolls have revealed to have been nearly as popular as the Torah, describes a group of 200 angels known as the "Watchers", who are assigned to supervise the earth but instead abandon their duties and have sexual intercourse with human women. The leader of the Watchers is Semjâzâ and another member of the group, known as Azazel, spreads sin and corruption among humankind. The Watchers are ultimately sequestered in isolated caves across the earth and are condemned to face judgement at the end of time. The Book of Jubilees, written around 150 BC, retells the story of the Watchers' defeat, but, in deviation from the Book of Enoch, Mastema, the "Chief of Spirits", intervenes before all of their demon offspring are sealed away, requesting for Yahweh to let him keep some of them to become his workers. Yahweh acquiesces to this request and Mastema uses them to tempt humans into committing more sins, so that he may punish them for their wickedness. Later, Mastema induces Yahweh to test Abraham by ordering him to sacrifice Isaac.

The Second Book of Enoch, also called the Slavonic Book of Enoch, contains references to a Watcher called Satanael. It is a pseudepigraphic text of an uncertain date and unknown authorship. The text describes Satanael as being the prince of the Grigori who was cast out of heaven and an evil spirit who knew the difference between what was "righteous" and "sinful". In the Book of Wisdom, the devil is taken to be the being who brought death into the world, but originally the culprit was recognized as Cain. The name Samael, which is used in reference to one of the fallen angels, later became a common name for Satan in Jewish Midrash and Kabbalah.

== Judaism ==
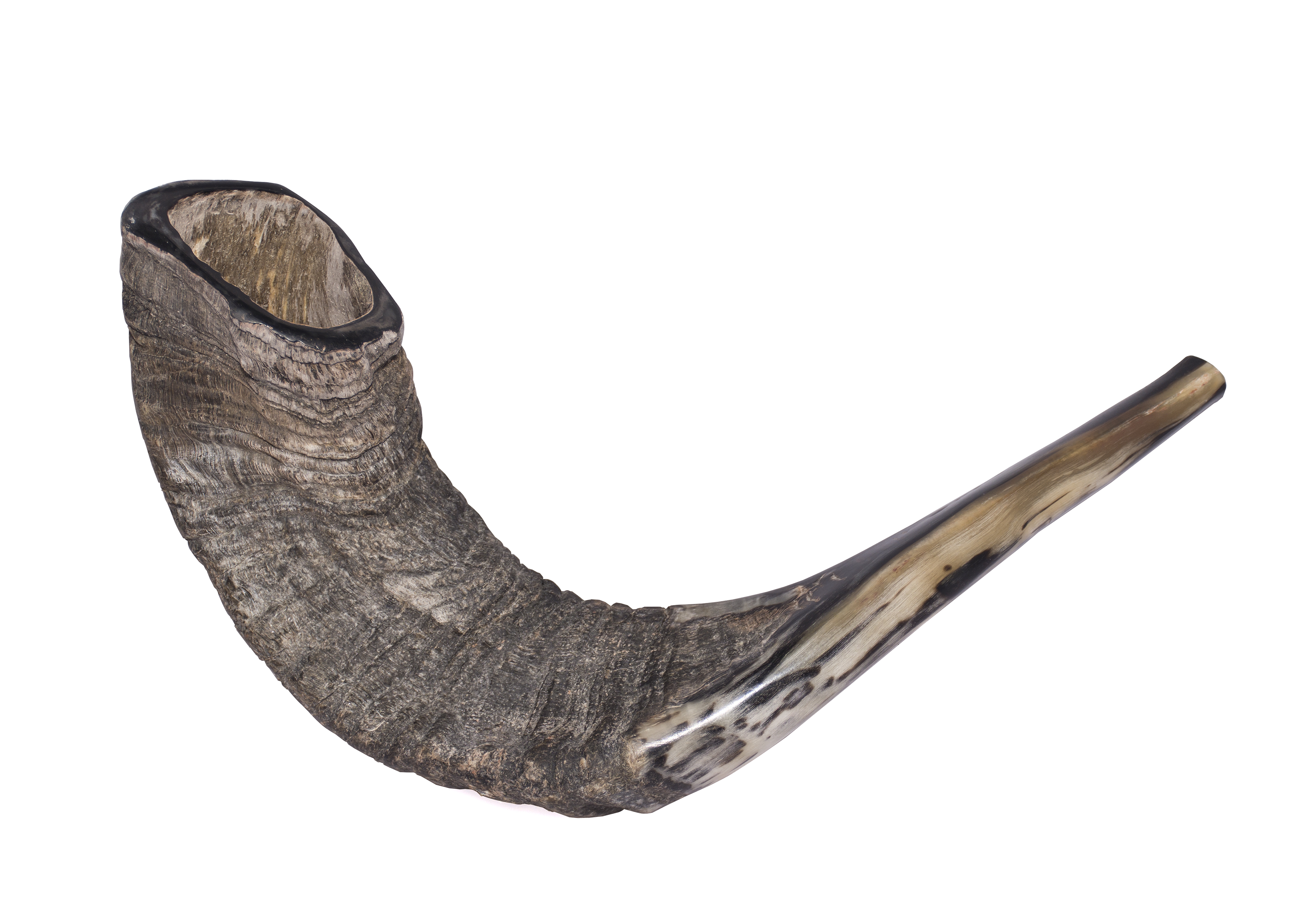
The sound of a shofar (pictured) is believed to symbolically confuse Satan.

Most Jews do not believe in the existence of a supernatural omnimalevolent figure. Traditionalists and philosophers in medieval Judaism adhered to rational theology, rejecting any belief in rebel or fallen angels, and viewing evil as abstract. The rabbis usually interpreted the word satan lacking the article ha-, as it is used in the Tanakh, as referring strictly to human adversaries. Nonetheless, the word satan has occasionally been metaphorically applied to evil influences, such as the Jewish exegesis of the yetzer hara ("evil inclination") mentioned in Genesis 6:5.

The Talmudic image of Satan is contradictory. While Satan's identification with the abstract yetzer hara remains uniform over the sages' teachings, he is generally identified as an entity with independent agency. For instance, one rabbi identified Satan both with the angel of death and with the yetzer hara. Satan's status as a personality is strengthened by numerous other rabbinical anecdotes: one tale describes incidents where Satan appeared as a woman in order to tempt Rabbi Meir and Rabbi Akiva into sin, while another describes Satan taking the form of an ill-mannered, diseased beggar in order to tempt the sage Peleimu into breaking the mitzvah of hospitality. Another passage relates that Satan once kissed the feet of Aha bar Jacob for having taught his students that his objectionable actions are done only to serve the intents of God.

Rabbinical scholarship on the Book of Job generally follows the Talmud and Maimonides in identifying "the satan" from the prologue as a metaphor for the yetzer hara and not an actual entity. Satan is rarely mentioned in Tannaitic literature, but is found in Babylonian aggadah. According to a narration, the sound of the shofar, which is primarily intended to remind Jews of the importance of teshuva, is also intended symbolically to "confuse the accuser" (Satan) and prevent him from rendering any litigation to God against the Jews. Kabbalah presents Satan as an agent of God whose function is to tempt humans into sinning so that he may accuse them in the heavenly court.

Modern denominations of Judaism have differing interpretations of Satan's identity. Orthodox Judaism accepts the diversity of Talmudic teachings on Satan, and Satan is mentioned in some standard prayers, such as the Shema blessings in Maariv. In Reform Judaism, Satan is generally seen in his Talmudic role as a metaphor for the yetzer hara and the symbolic representation of innate human qualities such as selfishness.

== Christianity ==
=== Names ===
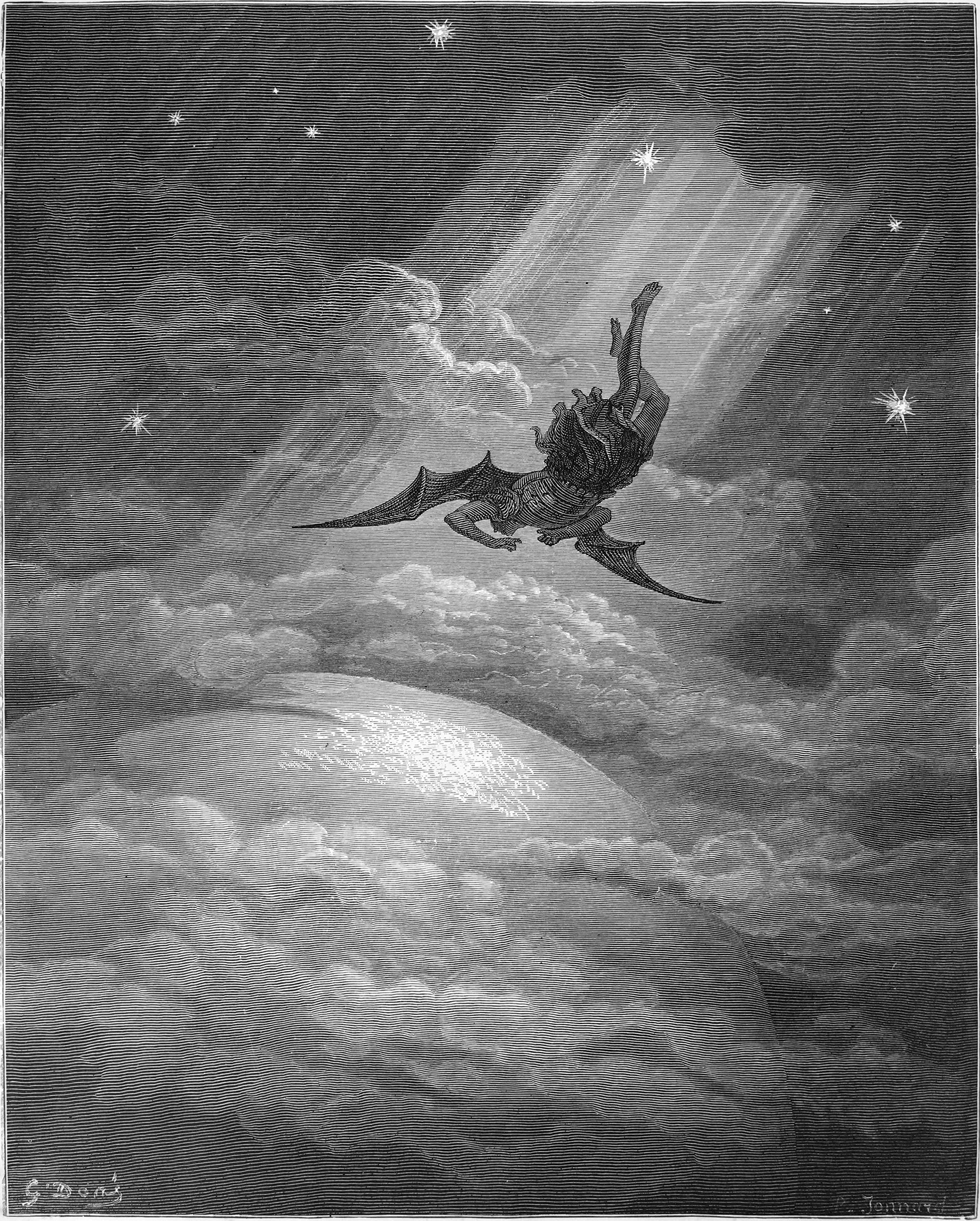
Illustration for John Milton's Paradise Lost, depicting the "Fall of Lucifer"

The most common English synonym for "Satan" is "devil", which descends from Middle English devel, from Old English dēofol, that in turn represents an early Germanic borrowing of Latin diabolus (also the source of "diabolical"). This in turn was borrowed from Greek diabolos "slanderer", from diaballein "to slander": dia- "across, through" + ballein "to hurl". In the New Testament, the words Satan and diabolos are used interchangeably as synonyms. Beelzebub, meaning "Lord of Flies", is the contemptuous name given in the Hebrew Bible and New Testament to a Philistine god whose original name has been reconstructed as most probably "Ba'al Zabul", meaning "Baal the Prince". The Synoptic Gospels identify Satan and Beelzebub as the same. The name Abaddon (meaning "place of destruction") is used six times in the Old Testament, mainly as a name for one of the regions of Sheol. Revelation 9:11 describes Abaddon, whose name is translated into Greek as Apollyon, meaning "the destroyer", as an angel who rules the Abyss. In modern usage, Abaddon is sometimes equated with Satan.

=== New Testament ===
==== Gospels, Acts, and epistles ====
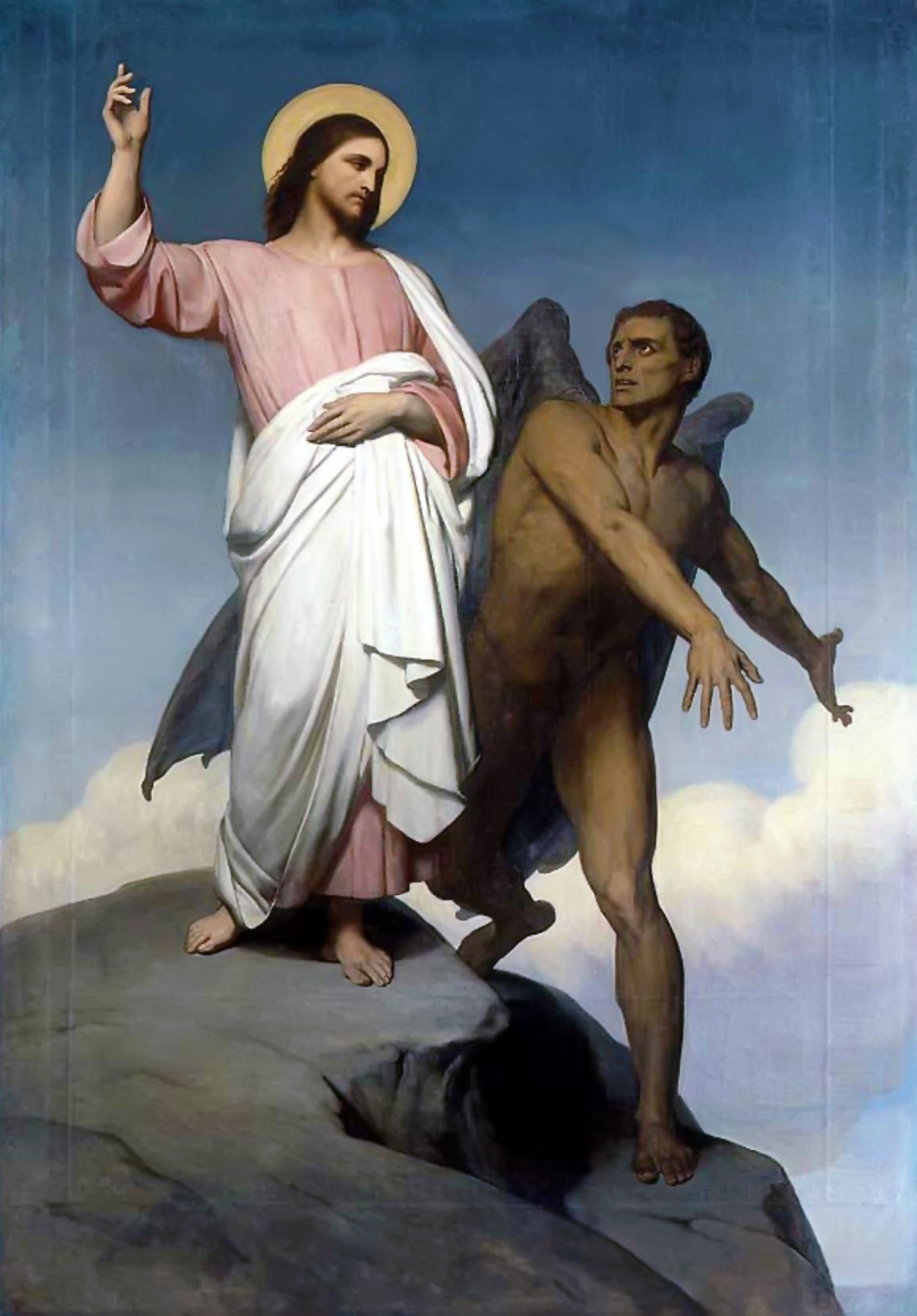
The Devil depicted in The Temptation of Christ, by Ary Scheffer, 1854

The three Synoptic Gospels all describe the temptation of Christ by Satan in the desert (Matthew 4:1–11, Mark 1:12–13, and Luke 4:1–13). Satan first shows Jesus a stone and tells him to turn it into bread. He also takes him to the pinnacle of the Temple in Jerusalem and commands Jesus to throw himself down so that the angels will catch him. Satan takes Jesus to the top of a tall mountain as well; there, he shows him the kingdoms of the earth and promises to give them all to him if he will bow down and worship him. Each time Jesus rebukes Satan and, after the third temptation, he is administered by the angels. Satan's promise in Matthew 4:8–9 and Luke 4:6–7 to give Jesus all the kingdoms of the earth implies that all those kingdoms belong to him. The fact that Jesus does not dispute Satan's promise indicates that the authors of those gospels believed this to be true.

Satan plays a role in some of the parables of Jesus, namely the Parable of the Sower, the Parable of the Weeds, Parable of the Sheep and the Goats, and the Parable of the Strong Man. According to the Parable of the Sower, Satan "profoundly influences" those who fail to understand the gospel. The latter two parables say that Satan's followers will be punished on Judgement Day, with the Parable of the Sheep and the Goats stating that the Devil, his angels, and the people who follow him will be consigned to "eternal fire". When the Pharisees accused Jesus of exorcising demons through the power of Beelzebub, Jesus responded by telling the Parable of the Strong Man, saying: "how can someone enter a strong man's house and plunder his goods, unless he first binds the strong man? Then indeed he may plunder his house" (Matthew 12:29). The strong man in this parable represents Satan.

The Synoptic Gospels identify Satan and his demons as the causes of illness, including fever (Luke 4:39), leprosy (Luke 5:13), and arthritis (Luke 13:11–16), while the Epistle to the Hebrews describes the Devil as "him who holds the power of death" (Hebrews 2:14). The author of Luke-Acts attributes more power to Satan than either Matthew and Mark. In Luke 22:31, Jesus grants Satan the authority to test Peter and the other apostles. Luke 22:3–6 states that Judas Iscariot betrayed Jesus because "Satan entered" him and, in Acts 5:3, Peter describes Satan as "filling" Ananias's heart and causing him to sin. The Gospel of John only uses the name Satan three times. In John 8:44, Jesus says that his Jewish or Judean enemies are the children of the Devil rather than the children of Abraham. The same verse describes the Devil as "a man-killer from the beginning" and "a liar and the father of lying." John 13:2 describes the Devil as inspiring Judas to betray Jesus and John 12:31–32 identifies Satan as "prince of this world", who is destined to be overthrown through Jesus's death and resurrection. John 16:7–8 promises that the Holy Spirit will "accuse the World concerning sin, justice, and judgement", a role resembling that of the Satan in the Old Testament.

Jude 9 refers to a dispute between Michael the Archangel and the Devil over the body of Moses. Some interpreters understand this reference to be an allusion to the events described in Zechariah 3:1–2. The classical theologian Origen attributes this reference to the non-canonical Assumption of Moses. According to James H. Charlesworth, there is no evidence the surviving book of this name ever contained any such content. Others believe it to be in the lost ending of the book. The second chapter of the pseudepigraphical Second Epistle of Peter copies much of the content of the Epistle of Jude, but omits the specifics of the example regarding Michael and Satan, with 2 Peter 2:10–11 instead mentioning only an ambiguous dispute between "Angels" and "Glories". Throughout the New Testament, Satan is referred to as a "tempter" (Matthew 4:3), "the ruler of the demons" (Matthew 12:24), "the God of this Age" (2 Corinthians 4:4), "the evil one" (1 John 5:18), and "a roaring lion" (1 Peter 5:8).

==== Book of Revelation ====
St. Michael Vanquishing Satan (1518) by Raphael, depicting Satan being cast out of heaven by Michael the Archangel, as described in Revelation 12:7–8

The Book of Revelation represents Satan as the supernatural ruler of the Roman Empire and the ultimate cause of all evil in the world. In Revelation 2:9–10, as part of the letter to the church at Smyrna, John of Patmos refers to the Jews of Smyrna as "a synagogue of Satan" and warns that "the Devil is about to cast some of you into prison as a test [peirasmos], and for ten days you will have affliction." In Revelation 2:13–14, in the letter to the church of Pergamum, John warns that Satan lives among the members of the congregation and declares that "Satan's throne" is in their midst. Pergamum was the capital of the Roman Province of Asia and "Satan's throne" may be referring to the monumental Pergamon Altar in the city, which was dedicated to the Greek god Zeus, or to a temple dedicated to the Roman emperor Augustus.

Revelation 12:3 describes a vision of a Great Red Dragon with seven heads, ten horns, seven crowns, and a massive tail, an image which is likely inspired by the vision of the four beasts from the sea in the Book of Daniel and the Leviathan described in various Old Testament passages. The Great Red Dragon knocks "a third of the sun... a third of the moon, and a third of the stars" out the sky and pursues the Woman of the Apocalypse. Revelation 12:7–9 declares: "And war broke out in Heaven. Michael and his angels fought against the Dragon. The Dragon and his angels fought back, but they were defeated, and there was no longer any place for them in Heaven. Dragon the Great was thrown down, that ancient serpent who is called Devil and Satan, the one deceiving the whole inhabited World – he was thrown down to earth, and his angels were thrown down with him." Then a voice booms down from Heaven heralding the defeat of "the Accuser" (ho Kantegor), identifying the Satan of Revelation with the satan of the Old Testament.

In Revelation 20:1–3, Satan is bound with a chain and hurled into the Abyss, where he is imprisoned for one thousand years. In Revelation 20:7–10, he is set free and gathers his armies along with Gog and Magog to wage war against the righteous, but is defeated with fire from Heaven, and cast into the lake of fire. Some Christians associate Satan with the number 666, which Revelation 13:18 describes as the Number of the Beast. However, the beast mentioned in Revelation 13 is not Satan, and the use of 666 in the Book of Revelation has been interpreted as a reference to the Roman Emperor Nero, as 666 is the numeric value of his name in Hebrew.

=== Patristic era ===
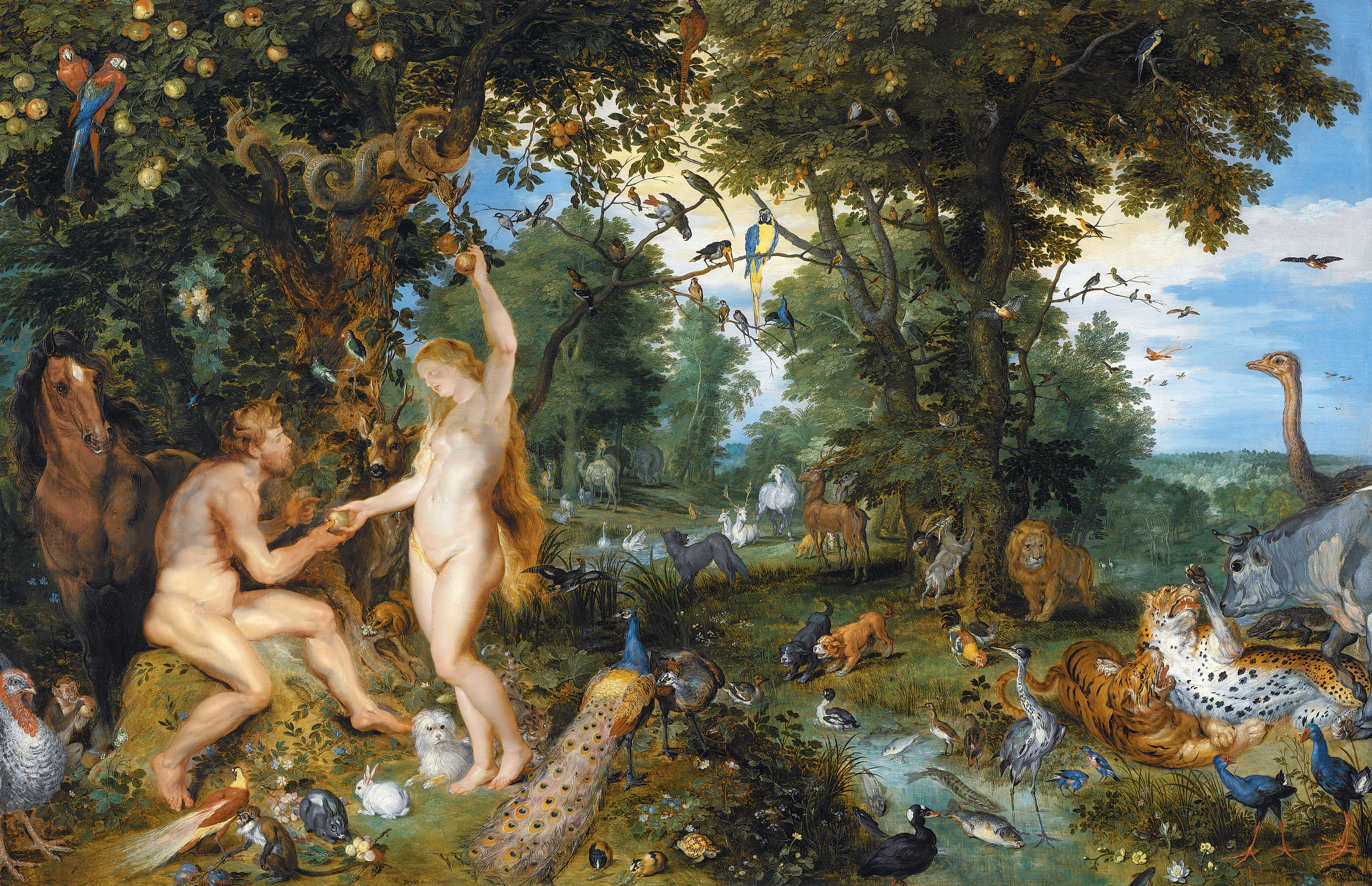
The Garden of Eden with the Fall of Man by Jan Brueghel the Elder and Pieter Paul Rubens, c. 1615, depicting Eve reaching for the forbidden fruit beside the Devil portrayed as a serpent

Christians have traditionally interpreted the unnamed serpent in the Garden of Eden as Satan due to Revelation 12:7, which calls Satan "that ancient serpent". This verse, however, is probably intended to identify Satan with the Leviathan, a monstrous sea-serpent whose destruction by Yahweh is prophesied in Isaiah 27:1. The first recorded individual to identify Satan with the serpent from the Garden of Eden was the second-century AD Christian apologist Justin Martyr, in chapters 45 and 79 of his Dialogue with Trypho. Other early Church Fathers to mention this identification include Theophilus and Tertullian. The early Christian Church, however, encountered opposition from pagans such as Celsus, who claimed in his treatise The True Word that "it is blasphemy... to say that the greatest God... has an adversary who constrains his capacity to do good" and said that Christians "impiously divide the kingdom of God, creating a rebellion in it, as if there were opposing factions within the divine, including one that is hostile to God".

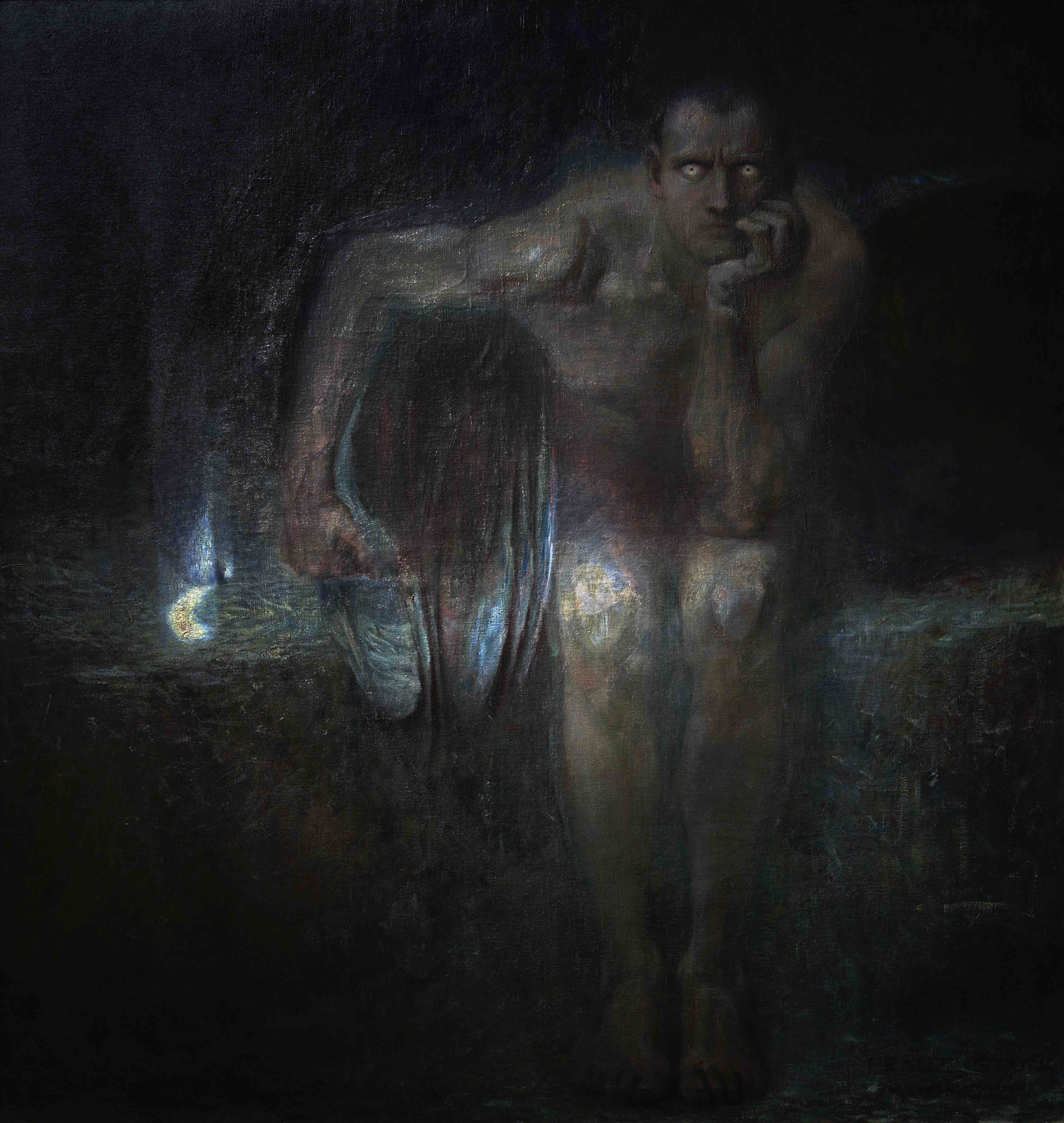
Lucifer (1890) by Franz Stuck. Because of Patristic interpretations of Isaiah 14:12 and Jerome's Latin Vulgate translation, the name "Lucifer" is sometimes used in reference to Satan.

The name Heylel, meaning "morning star" (or, in Latin, Lucifer), (Note: The Latin Vulgate translation of this passage renders Heylel as "Lucifer" and this name continues to be used by some Christians as an alternative name for Satan.) was a name for Attar, the god of the planet Venus in Canaanite mythology, who attempted to scale the walls of the heavenly city, but was vanquished by the god of the sun. The name is used in Isaiah 14:12 in metaphorical reference to the king of Babylon. Ezekiel 28:12–15 uses a description of a cherub in Eden as a polemic against Ithobaal II, the king of Tyre.

The Church Father Origen of Alexandria (c. 184 – c. 253), who was only aware of the actual text of these passages and not the original myths to which they refer, concluded in his treatise On the First Principles, which is preserved in a Latin translation by Tyrannius Rufinus, that neither of these verses could literally refer to a human being. He concluded that Isaiah 14:12 is an allegory for Satan and that Ezekiel 28:12–15 is an allusion to "a certain Angel who had received the office of governing the nation of the Tyrians", but was hurled down to Earth after he was found to be corrupt. In his apologetic treatise Contra Celsum, however, Origen interprets both Isaiah 14:12 and Ezekiel 28:12–15 as referring to Satan. According to Henry Ansgar Kelly, Origen seems to have adopted this new interpretation to refute unnamed persons who, perhaps under the influence of Zoroastrian radical dualism, believed "that Satan's original nature was Darkness." The later Church Father Jerome (c. 347 – 420), translator of the Latin Vulgate, accepted Origen's theory of Satan as a fallen angel and wrote about it in his commentary on the Book of Isaiah. In Christian tradition ever since, both Isaiah 14:12 and Ezekiel 28:12–15 have been understood as allegorically referring to Satan. For most Christians, Satan has been regarded as an angel who rebelled against God.

According to the ransom theory of atonement, which was popular among early Christian theologians, Satan gained power over humanity through Adam and Eve's sin, and Christ's death on the cross was a ransom to Satan in exchange for humanity's liberation. This theory holds that Satan was tricked by God because Christ was not only free of sin, but also the incarnate Deity, whom Satan lacked the ability to enslave. Irenaeus of Lyons described a prototypical form of the ransom theory, but Origen was the first to propose it in its fully developed form. The theory was later expanded by theologians such as Gregory of Nyssa and Rufinus of Aquileia. In the eleventh century, Anselm of Canterbury criticized the ransom theory, along with the associated Christus Victor theory, resulting in the theory's decline in western Europe. The theory has nonetheless retained some of its popularity in the Eastern Orthodox Church.

Most early Christians firmly believed that Satan and his demons had the power to possess humans, and exorcisms were widely practiced by Jews, Christians, and pagans alike. Belief in demonic possession continued through the Middle Ages into the early modern period. Exorcisms were seen as a display of God's power over Satan. The vast majority of people who thought they were possessed by the Devil did not suffer from hallucinations or other "spectacular symptoms", but "complained of anxiety, religious fears, and evil thoughts".

=== Middle Ages ===
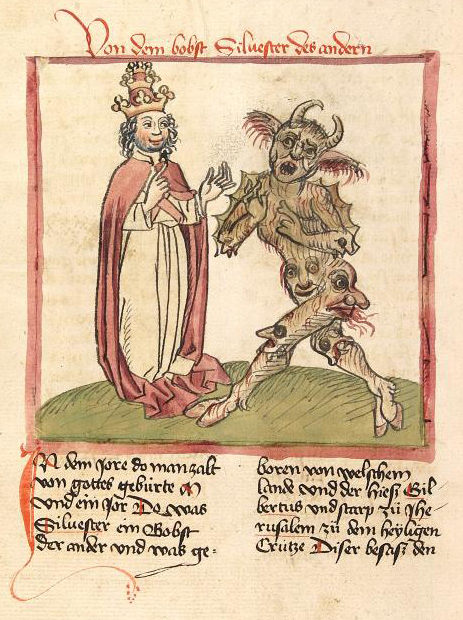
Medieval miniature depicting Pope Sylvester II consorting with Satan (c. 1460)

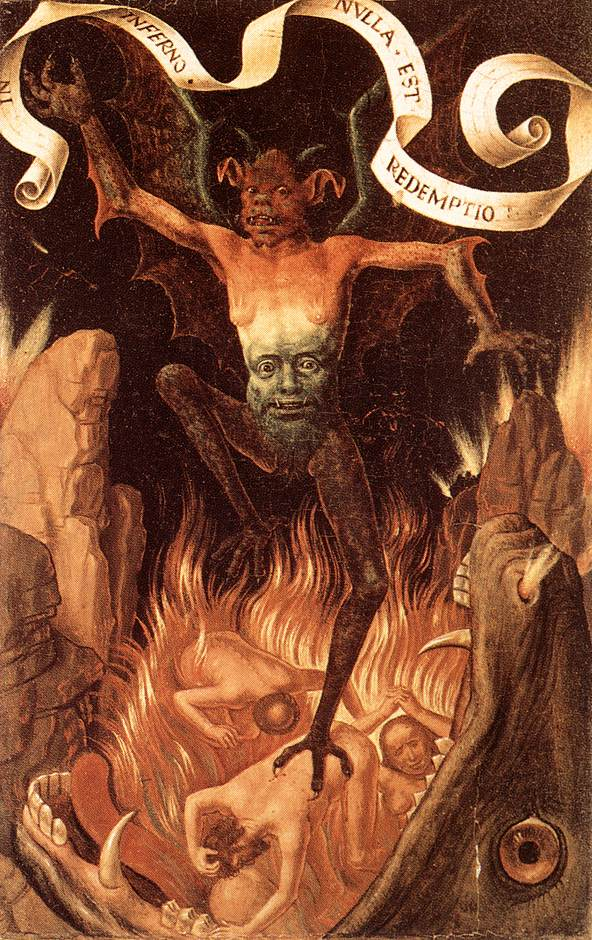
Detail of Satan from Hans Memling's Triptych of Earthly Vanity and Divine Salvation (c. 1485)

Satan had minimal role in medieval Christian theology, but he frequently appeared as a recurring comedic stock character in late medieval mystery plays, in which he was portrayed as a comic relief figure who "frolicked, fell, and farted in the background". Jeffrey Burton Russell describes the medieval conception of Satan as "more pathetic and repulsive than terrifying" and he was seen as little more than a nuisance to God's overarching plan. The Golden Legend, a collection of saints' lives compiled in around 1260 by the Dominican Friar Jacobus de Voragine, contains numerous stories about encounters between saints and Satan, in which Satan is constantly duped by the saints' cleverness and by the power of God. Henry Ansgar Kelly remarks that Satan "comes across as the opposite of fearsome". The Golden Legend was the most popular book during the High and Late Middle Ages and more manuscripts of it have survived from the period than of any other book, including even the Bible itself.

The Canon Episcopi, written in the eleventh century AD, condemns belief in witchcraft as heretical, but also documents that many people at the time apparently believed in it. Witches were believed to fly through the air on broomsticks, consort with demons, perform in "lurid sexual rituals" in the forests, murder human infants and eat them as part of Satanic rites, and engage in conjugal relations with demons. In 1326, Pope John XXII issued the papal bull Super illius Specula, which condemned folk divination practices as consultation with Satan. By the 1430s, the Catholic Church began to regard witchcraft as part of a vast conspiracy led by Satan himself.

=== Early modern period ===
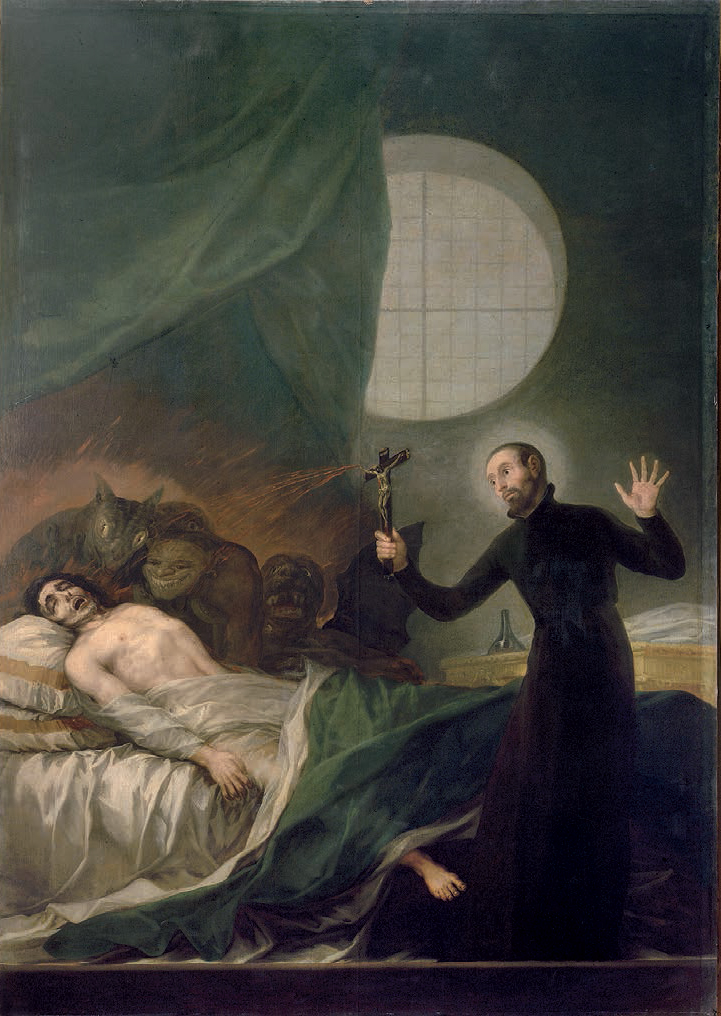
Painting from c. 1788 by Francisco Goya depicting Saint Francis Borgia performing an exorcism. During the early modern period, exorcisms were seen as displays of God's power over Satan.

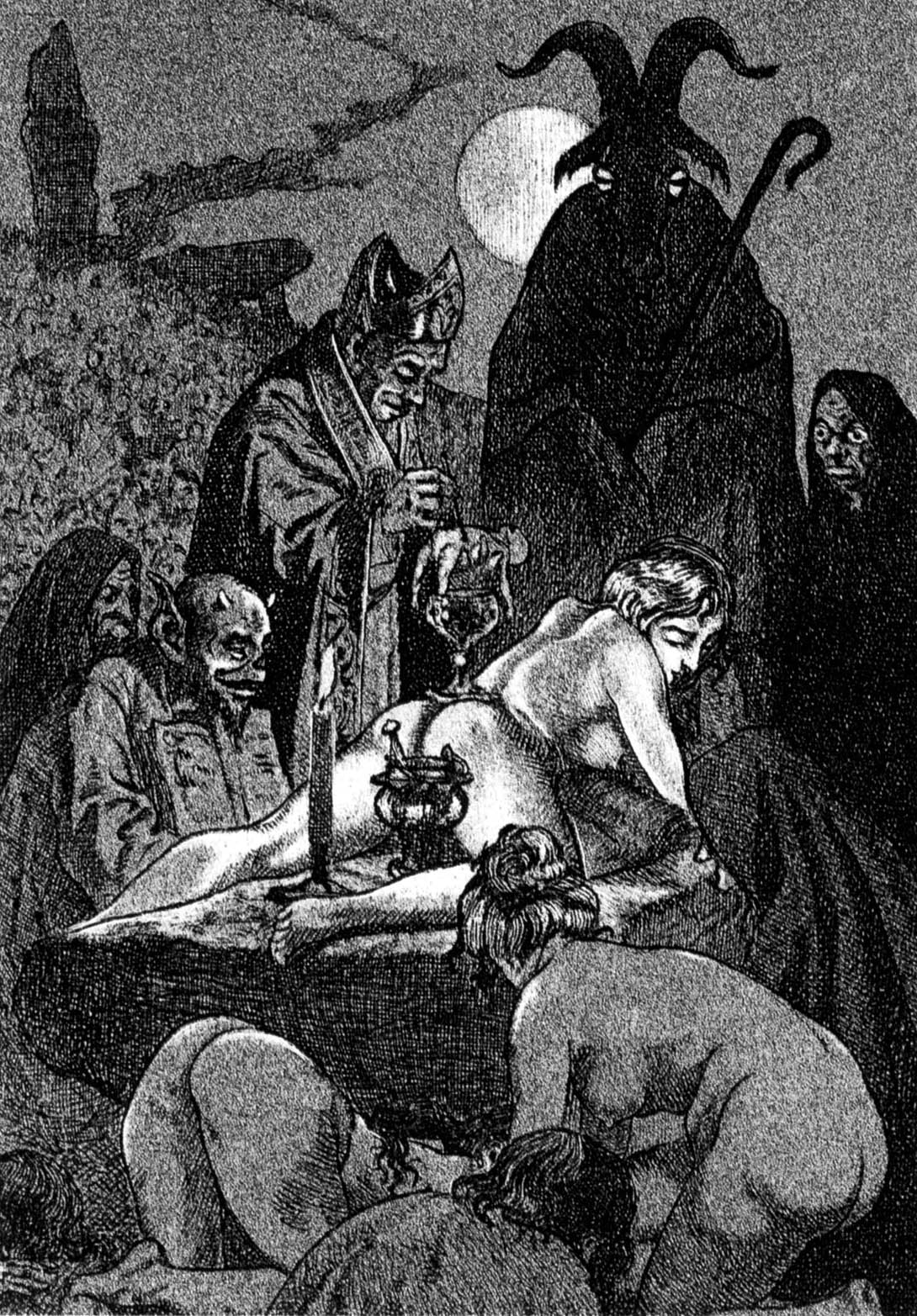
During the early modern period, witches were widely believed to engage in sexually explicit Satanic rituals with demons, such as the one shown in this illustration by Martin van Maële in the 1911 edition of Satanism and Witchcraft by Jules Michelet.

During the Early Modern Period, Christians gradually began to regard Satan as increasingly powerful and the fear of Satan's power became a dominant aspect of the worldview of Christians across Europe. During the Protestant Reformation, Martin Luther taught that, rather than trying to argue with Satan, Christians should avoid temptation altogether by seeking out pleasant company; Luther especially recommended music as a safeguard against temptation, since the Devil "cannot endure gaiety". John Calvin repeated a maxim from Saint Augustine that "Man is like a horse, with either God or the devil as rider."

In the late fifteenth century, a series of witchcraft panics erupted in France and Germany. The German Inquisitors Heinrich Kramer and Jacob Sprenger argued in their book Malleus Maleficarum, published in 1487, that all maleficia ("sorcery") was rooted in the work of Satan. In the mid-sixteenth century, the panic spread to England and Switzerland. Both Protestants and Catholics alike firmly believed in witchcraft as a real phenomenon and supported its prosecution. In the late 1500s, the Dutch demonologist Johann Weyer argued in his treatise De praestigiis daemonum that witchcraft did not exist, but that Satan promoted belief in it to lead Christians astray. The panic over witchcraft intensified in the 1620s and continued until the end of the 1600s. Brian Levack estimates that around 60,000 people were executed for witchcraft during the entire span of the witchcraft hysteria.

The early English settlers of North America, especially the Puritans of New England, believed that Satan "visibly and palpably" reigned in the New World. John Winthrop claimed that the Devil made rebellious Puritan women give birth to stillborn monsters with claws, sharp horns, and "on each foot three claws, like a young fowl". Cotton Mather wrote that devils swarmed around Puritan settlements "like the frogs of Egypt". The Puritans believed that the Native Americans were worshippers of Satan and described them as "children of the Devil". Some settlers claimed to have seen Satan himself appear in the flesh at native ceremonies. During the First Great Awakening, the "new light" preachers portrayed their "old light" critics as ministers of Satan. By the time of the Second Great Awakening, Satan's primary role in American evangelicalism was as the opponent of the evangelical movement itself, who spent most of his time trying to hinder the ministries of evangelical preachers, a role he has largely retained among present-day American fundamentalists.

By the early 1600s, skeptics in Europe, including the English author Reginald Scot and the Anglican bishop John Bancroft, had begun to criticize the belief that demons still had the power to possess people. This skepticism was bolstered by the belief that miracles only occurred during the Apostolic Age, which had long since ended. Later, Enlightenment thinkers, such as David Hume, Denis Diderot, and Voltaire, attacked the notion of Satan's existence altogether. Voltaire labelled John Milton's Paradise Lost a "disgusting fantasy" and declared that belief in Hell and Satan were among the many lies propagated by the Catholic Church to keep humanity enslaved. By the eighteenth century, trials for witchcraft had ceased in most western countries, with the notable exceptions of Poland and Hungary, where they continued. Belief in the power of Satan, however, remained strong among traditional Christians.

=== Modern era ===
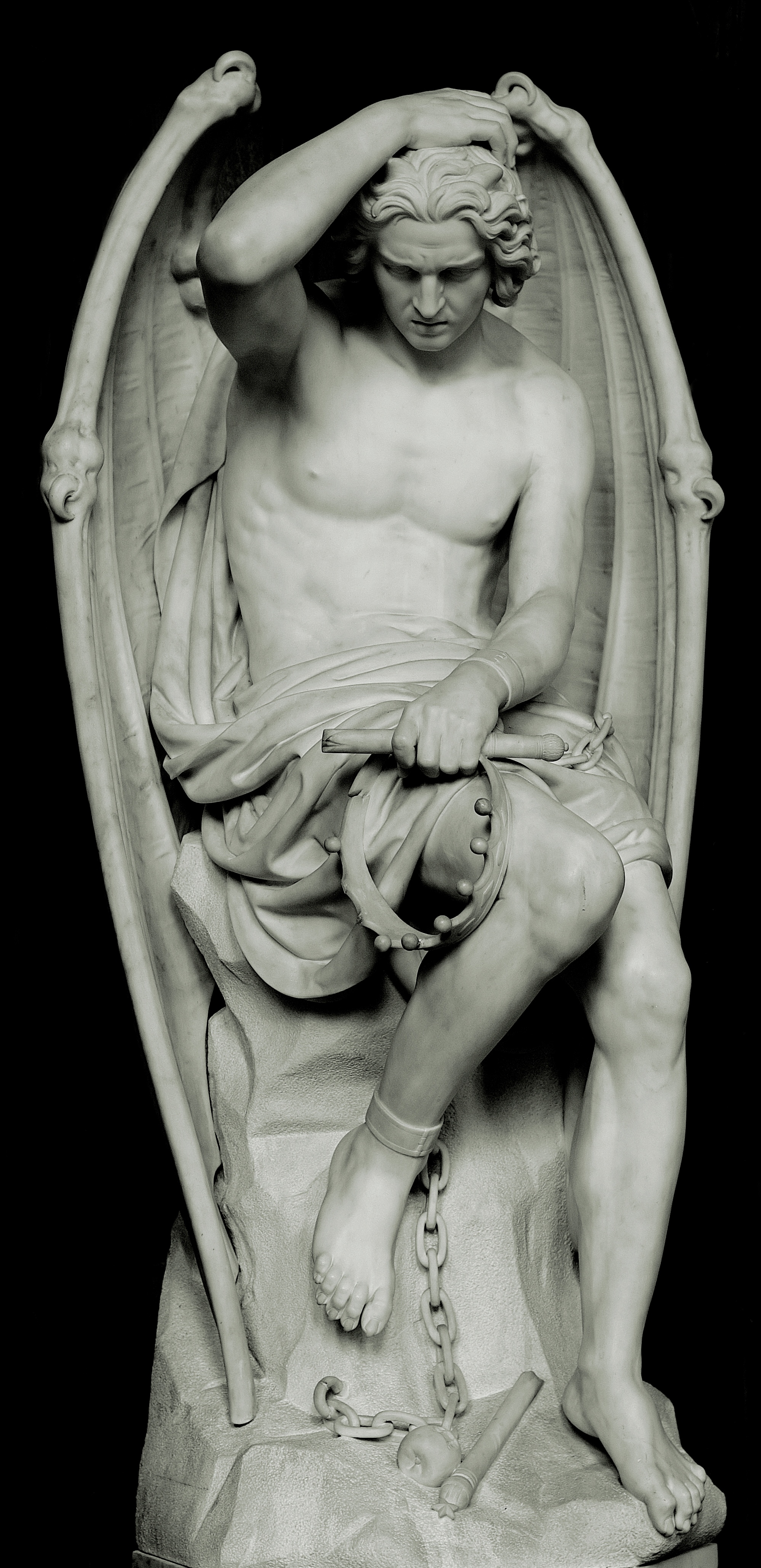
The Genius of Evil (1848) by Guillaume Geefs

Mormonism developed its own views on Satan. According to the Book of Moses, the Devil offered to be the redeemer of mankind for the sake of his own glory. Conversely, Jesus offered to be the redeemer of mankind so that his father's will would be done. After his offer was rejected, Satan became rebellious and was subsequently cast out of heaven. In the Book of Moses, Cain is said to have "loved Satan more than God" and conspired with Satan to kill Abel. It was through this pact that Cain became a Master Mahan. The Book of Moses also says that Moses was tempted by Satan before calling upon the name of the "Only Begotten", which caused Satan to depart. Douglas Davies asserts that this text "reflects" the temptation of Jesus in the Bible.

Belief in Satan and demonic possession remains strong among Christians in the United States and Latin America. According to a 2013 poll conducted by YouGov, fifty-seven percent of people in the United States believe in a literal Devil, compared to eighteen percent of people in Britain. Fifty-one percent of Americans believe that Satan has the power to possess people. W. Scott Poole, author of Satan in America: The Devil We Know, has opined that "In the United States over the last forty to fifty years, a composite image of Satan has emerged that borrows from both popular culture and theological sources" and that most American Christians do not "separate what they know [about Satan] from the movies from what they know from various ecclesiastical and theological traditions". The Catholic Church generally played down Satan and exorcism during late twentieth and early twenty-first centuries, but Pope Francis brought renewed focus on the Devil in the early 2010s, stating, among many other pronouncements, that "The devil is intelligent, he knows more theology than all the theologians together." According to the Encyclopædia Britannica, liberal Christianity tends to view Satan "as a [figurative] mythological attempt to express the reality and extent of evil in the universe, existing outside and apart from humanity but profoundly influencing the human sphere".

Bernard McGinn describes multiple traditions detailing the relationship between the Antichrist and Satan. In the dualist approach, Satan will become incarnate in the Antichrist, just as God became incarnate in Jesus. However, in Orthodox Christian thought, this view is problematic because it is too similar to Christ's incarnation. Instead, the "indwelling" view has become more accepted, which stipulates that the Antichrist is a human figure inhabited by Satan, since the latter's power is not to be seen as equivalent to God's.

== Islam ==
The Arabic equivalent of the word Satan is Shaitan (شيطان, from the triliteral root š-ṭ-n شط⁬ن). The word itself is an adjective (meaning "astray" or "distant", sometimes translated as "devil") that can be applied to both man ("al-ins", الإنس) and al-jinn (الجن), but it is also used in reference to Satan in particular. In the Quran, Satan's name is Iblis (Arabic pronunciation: [ˈibliːs]), probably a derivative of the Greek word diabolos. Muslims do not regard Satan as the cause of evil, but as a tempter, who takes advantage of humans' inclinations toward self-centeredness.

=== Quran ===
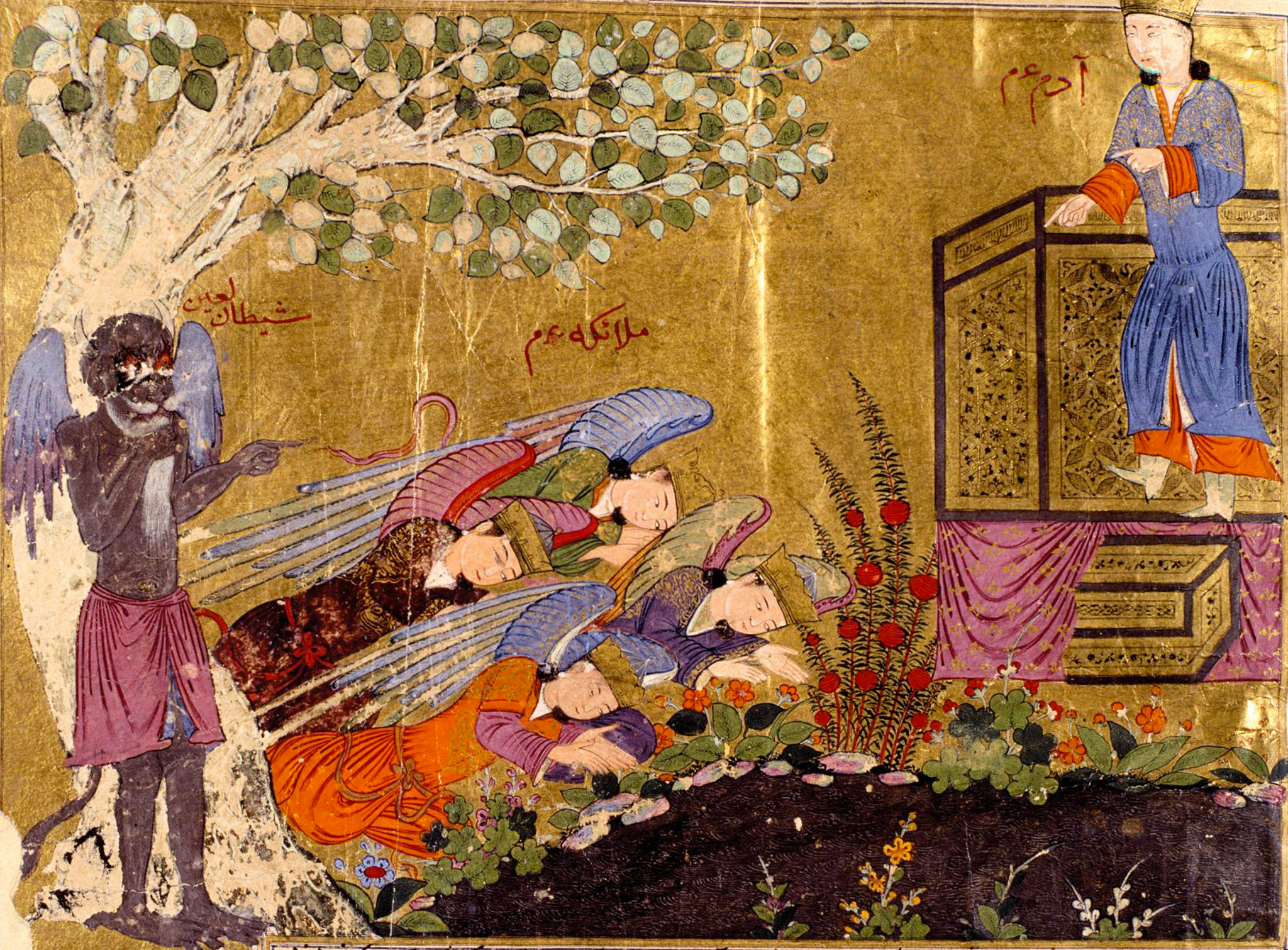
Illustration from a manuscript subsection of Bal'ami's Persian translation of the Annals, showing Satan (Iblis) refusing to prostrate before the newly created man (Adam)

Seven chapters in the Quran describe how God ordered all the angels and Iblis to bow before the newly created human, Adam. All the angels bowed, but Iblis refused, claiming to be superior to Adam because he was made from fire, whereas Adam was made from clay (7:12). Consequently, God expelled him from Paradise and condemned him to Jahannam. Iblis thereafter became a kafir, "an ungrateful disbeliever", whose sole mission is to lead humanity astray. (Q17:62) God allows Iblis to do this, because he knows that the righteous will be able to resist Iblis's attempts to misguide them. On Judgement Day, while the lot of Satan remains in question, those who followed him will be thrown into the fires of Jahannam. After his banishment from Paradise, Iblis, who thereafter became known as Al-Shaitan ("the Demon"), lured Adam and Eve into eating the forbidden fruit.

The primary characteristic of Satan, aside from his hubris and despair, is his ability to cast evil suggestions (waswās) into men and women. 15:45 states that Satan has no influence over the righteous, but that those who fall in error are under his power. 7:156 implies that those who obey God's laws are immune to the temptations of Satan. 56:79 warns that Satan tries to keep Muslims from reading the Quran and 16:98–100 recommends reciting the Quran as an antidote against Satan. 35:6 refers to Satan as the enemy of humanity and 36:60 forbids humans from worshipping him. In the Quranic retelling of the story of Job, Job knows that Satan is the one tormenting him.

=== Islamic tradition ===
==== Affiliation ====
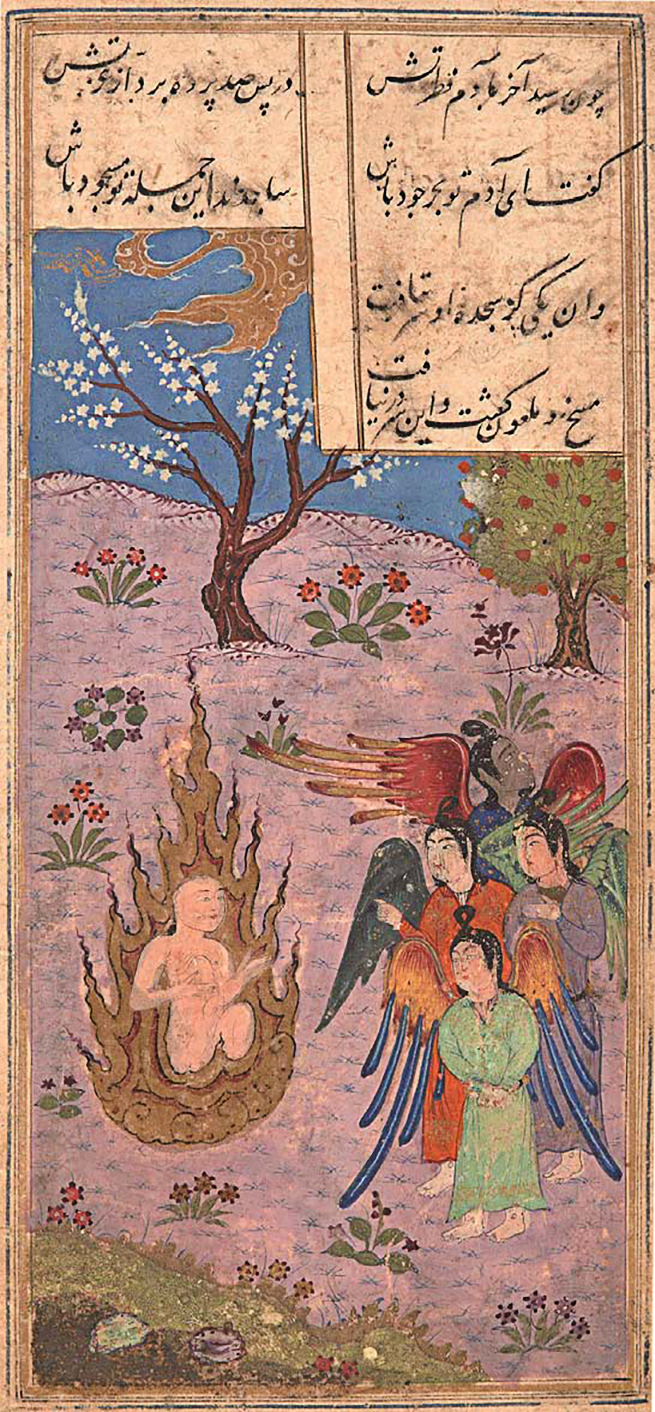
The angels meet Adam, and their body language reveals they share, albeit to a lesser degree, the defiant reaction of Iblīs, who stands at the back haughtily turning his head away. According to some traditions, God created Iblīs as a beautiful angel named ʿAzāzīl and he is depicted here as such. He is portrayed with his characteristic darker skin to denote his impending fall but has wings of an angel and wears the contemporary 'angelic hairstyle', a loop of hair tied on top of the head.

In the Quran, Satan is apparently an angel, while, in 18:50, he is described as "from the jinns". This, combined with the fact that he describes himself as having been made from fire, posed a major problem for Muslim exegetes of the Quran, who disagree on whether Satan is a fallen angel or the leader of a group of evil jinn. According to a hadith from Ibn Abbas, Iblis was actually an angel whom God created out of fire. Ibn Abbas asserts that the word jinn could be applied to earthly jinn, but also to "fiery angels" like Satan.

Hasan of Basra, an eminent Muslim theologian who lived in the seventh century AD, was quoted as saying: "Iblis was not an angel even for the time of an eye wink. He is the origin of Jinn as Adam is of Mankind." The medieval Persian scholar Abu al-Zamakhshari states that the words angels and jinn are synonyms. Another Persian scholar, al-Baydawi, instead argues that Satan was an angel in essence, but behaved like the jinn. Abu Mansur al-Maturidi who is revered as the founder of Māturīdiyya Sunni orthodoxy (kalam) argued that since angels can be blessed by God, they are also put to a test and can be punished. Accordingly, Satan became a devil (shaiṭān) or jinn after he refused to obey. The Tarikh Khamis narrates that Satan was a jinn who was admitted into Paradise as a reward for his righteousness and, unlike the angels, was given the choice to obey or disobey God. When he was expelled from Paradise, Satan blamed humanity for his punishment.

Concerning the fiery origin of Iblis, al-Baydawi asserts that fire and light are of the same substance but with different attributes and thus, there is no real difference. Similarly, the historian Zakariya al-Qazwini and also Muhammad ibn Ahmad Ibshihi state that there is no fundamental difference between light and fire, for all supernatural creatures were created from fire, but the angels from its light and the jinn from its blaze. Abd al-Ghani al-Maqdisi and Ibn Barrajan argued that only the angels of mercy are created from light, but angels of punishment have been created from fire.

The Muslim historian and theologian Al-Tabari, who died in around 923 AD, writes that, before Adam was created, earthly jinn made of smokeless fire roamed the earth and spread corruption. He further relates that Iblis was originally an angel named Azazil or Al-Harith, from a group of angels, created from the fires of simoom, sent by God to confront the earthly jinn. Azazil defeated the jinn in battle and drove them into the mountains, but he became convinced that he was superior to humans and all the other angels, leading to his downfall. In this account, Azazil's group of angels were called jinn because they guarded Jannah (Paradise). In another tradition recorded by Al-Tabari, Satan was one of the earthly jinn, who was taken captive by the angels and brought to Heaven as a prisoner. God appointed him as judge over the other jinn and he became known as Al-Hakam. He fulfilled his duty for a thousand years before growing negligent, but was rehabilitated again and resumed his position until his refusal to bow before Adam.

==== Other traditions ====
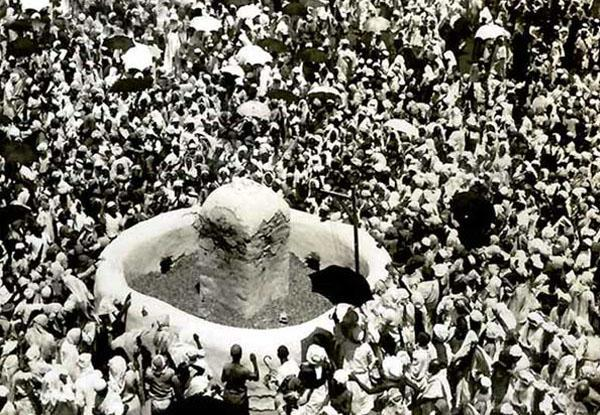
A stoning of the Devil from 1942

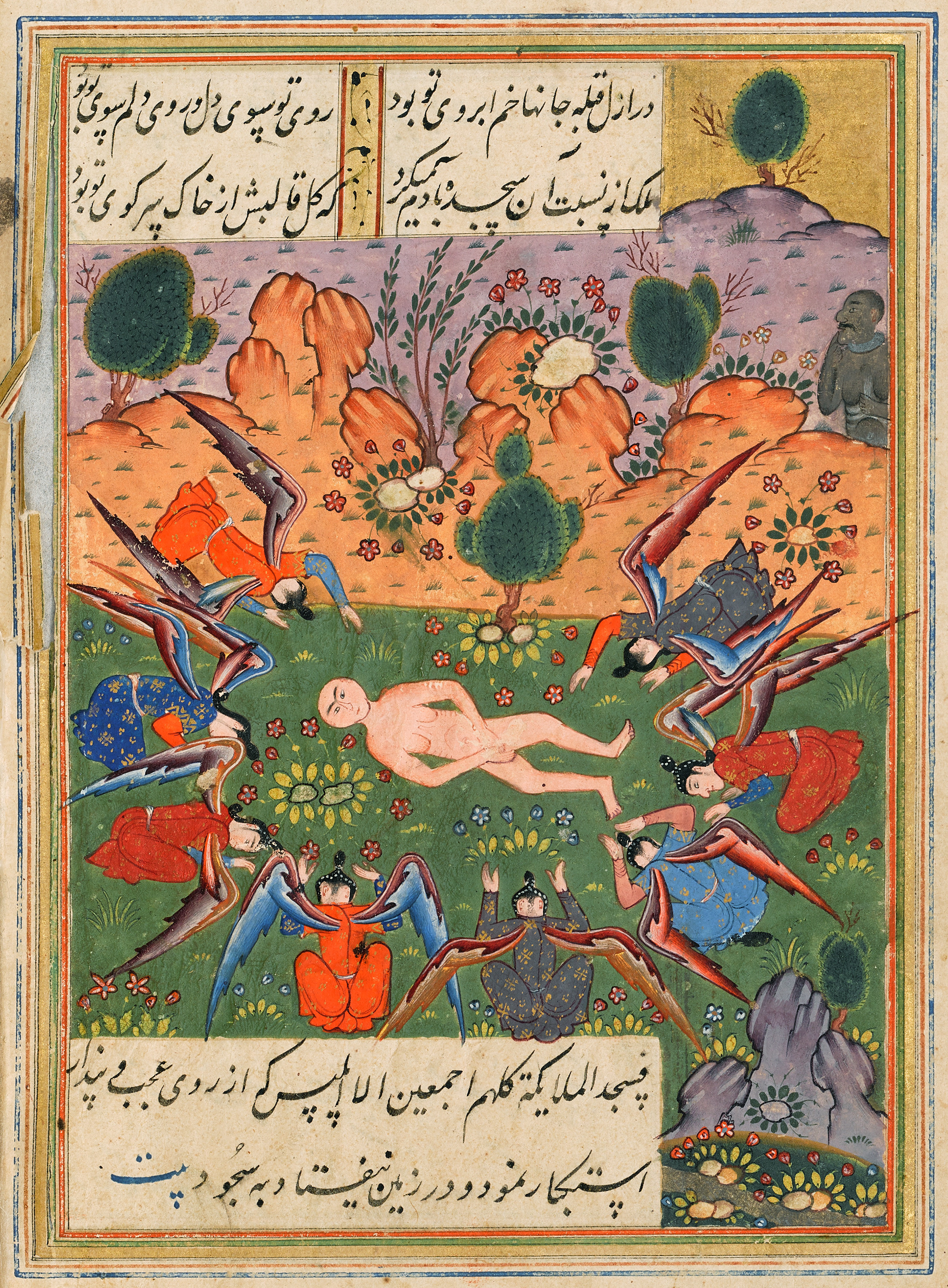
Angels bow before the newly created Adam, but Iblis (top right on the picture) refuses to prostrate.

During the first two centuries of Islam, Muslims almost unanimously accepted the traditional story known as the Satanic Verses as true. According to this narrative, Muhammad was told by Satan to add words to the Quran which would allow Muslims to pray for the intercession of pagan goddesses. He mistook the words of Satan for divine inspiration. Modern Muslims almost universally reject this story as heretical, as it calls the integrity of the Quran into question.

On the third day of the Hajj, Muslim pilgrims to Mecca throw seven stones at a pillar known as the Jamrah al-'Aqabah, symbolizing the stoning of the Devil. This ritual is based on the Islamic tradition that, when God ordered Abraham to sacrifice his son Ishmael, Satan tempted him three times not to do it, and, each time, Abraham responded by throwing seven stones at him.

The hadith teach that newborn babies cry because Satan touches them while they are being born, and that this touch causes people to have an aptitude for sin. This doctrine bears some similarities to the doctrine of original sin. Muslim tradition holds that only Jesus and Mary were not touched by Satan at birth. However, when he was a boy, Muhammad's heart was literally opened by an angel, who removed a black clot that symbolized sin.

Muslim tradition preserves a number of stories involving dialogues between Jesus and Iblis, all of which are intended to demonstrate Jesus's virtue and Satan's depravity. Ahmad ibn Hanbal records an Islamic retelling of Jesus's temptation by Satan in the desert from the Synoptic Gospels. Ahmad quotes Jesus as saying, "The greatest sin is love of the world. Women are the ropes of Satan. Wine is the key to every evil." Abu Uthman al-Jahiz credits Jesus with saying, "The world is Satan's farm, and its people are his plowmen." Al-Ghazali tells an anecdote about how Jesus went out one day and saw Satan carrying ashes and honey; when he asked what they were for, Satan replied, "The honey I put on the lips of backbiters so that they achieve their aim. The ashes I put on the faces of orphans, so that people come to dislike them." The thirteenth-century scholar Sibt ibn al-Jawzi states that, when Jesus asked him what truly broke his back, Satan replied, "The neighing of horses in the cause of Allah."

Muslims believe that Satan is also the cause of deceptions originating from the mind and desires for evil. He is regarded as a cosmic force for separation, despair and spiritual envelopment. Muslims do distinguish between the satanic temptations and the murmurings of the bodily lower self (nafs). The lower self commands the person to do a specific task or to fulfill a specific desire; whereas the inspirations of Satan tempt the person to do evil in general and, after a person successfully resists his first suggestion, Satan returns with new ones. If a Muslim feels that Satan is inciting him to sin, he is advised to seek refuge with God by reciting: "In the name of Allah, I seek refuge in you, from Satan the outcast." Muslims are also obliged to "seek refuge" before reciting the Quran.

=== Islamic mysticism ===
According to some adherents of Sufi mysticism, Iblis refused to bow to Adam because he was fully devoted to God alone and refused to bow to anyone else. For this reason, Sufi masters regard Satan and Muhammad as the two most perfect monotheists. Sufis reject the concept of dualism and instead believe in the unity of existence. In the same way that Muhammad was the instrument of God's mercy, Sufis regard Satan as the instrument of God's wrath. For the Muslim Sufi scholar Ahmad Ghazali, Iblis was the paragon of lovers in self-sacrifice for refusing to bow down to Adam out of pure devotion to God. Ahmad Ghazali's student Sheikh Adi ibn Musafir was among the Sunni Muslim mystics who defended Iblis and asserted that evil was also God's creation. Sheikh Adi argued that if evil existed without the will of God, then God would be powerless and powerlessness can't be attributed to God. Some Sufis assert that since Iblis was destined by God to become a devil, God will also restore him to his former angelic nature. Attar compares Iblis's damnation to the Biblical Benjamin: both were accused unjustly, but their punishment had a greater meaning. In the end, Iblis will be released from hell.

However, not all Muslim Sufi mystics are in agreement with a positive depiction of Iblis. Rumi's viewpoint on Iblis is much more in tune with Islamic orthodoxy. Rumi views Iblis as the manifestation of the great sins of haughtiness and envy. He states: "(Cunning) intelligence is from Iblis, and love from Adam."

== Baháʼí Faith ==
In the Baháʼí Faith, Satan is not regarded as an independent evil power as he is in some faiths, but signifies the lower nature of humans. `Abdu'l-Bahá explains: "This lower nature in man is symbolized as Satan—the evil ego within us, not an evil personality outside." All other evil spirits described in various faith traditions—such as fallen angels, demons, and jinns—are also metaphors for the base character traits a human being may acquire and manifest when he turns away from God. Actions that are described as "satanic" in some Baháʼí writings denote humans' deeds caused by selfish desires.

== Satanism ==
The inverted pentagram, along with Baphomet, is the most notable and widespread symbol of Satanism.

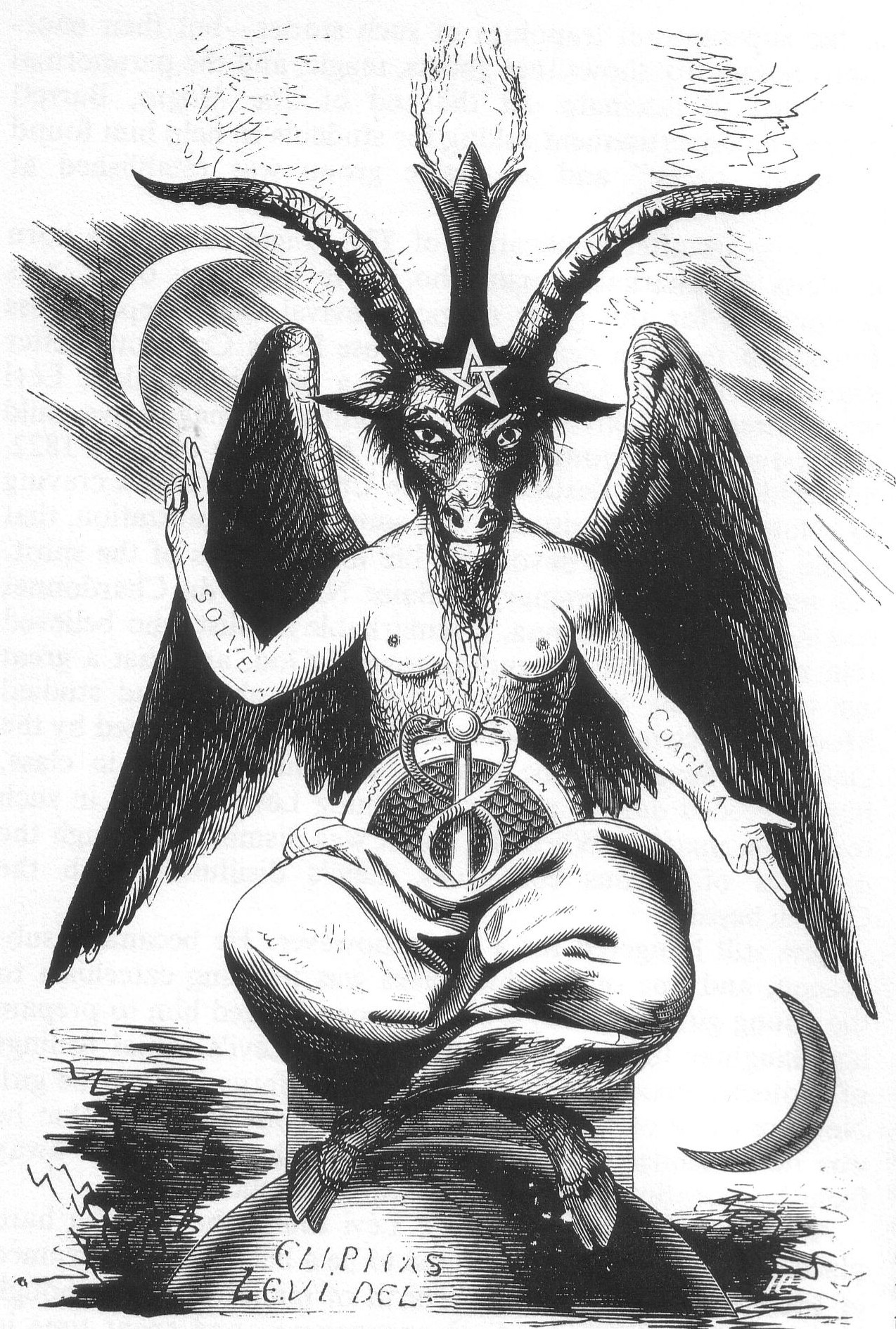
The Sabbatic Goat, also known as the Goat of Mendes or Baphomet, as illustrated by Éliphas Lévi, has become one of the most common symbols of Satanism.

=== Atheistic Satanism ===
Atheistic Satanism, as exemplified by LaVeyan Satanism (practiced by the Church of Satan and First Satanic Church) and The Satanic Temple, holds that Satan does not exist as a literal anthropomorphic entity, but rather as a symbol of a cosmos which Satanists perceive to be permeated and motivated by a force that has been given many names by humans over the course of time. In this religion, "Satan" is not viewed or depicted as a hubristic, irrational, and fraudulent creature, but rather is revered with Prometheus-like attributes, symbolizing liberty and individual empowerment. To adherents, he also serves as a conceptual framework and an external metaphorical projection of the Satanist's highest personal potential. In his essay "Satanism: The Feared Religion", the current High Priest of the Church of Satan, Peter H. Gilmore, further expounds that "...Satan is a symbol of Man living as his prideful, carnal nature dictates. The reality behind Satan is simply the dark evolutionary force of entropy that permeates all of nature and provides the drive for survival and propagation inherent in all living things. Satan is not a conscious entity to be worshiped, rather a reservoir of power inside each human to be tapped at will".

LaVeyan Satanists embrace the original etymological meaning of the word "Satan" (Hebrew: שָּׂטָן satan, meaning "adversary"). According to Gilmore, "The Church of Satan has chosen Satan as its primary symbol because in Hebrew it means adversary, opposer, one to accuse or question. We see ourselves as being these Satans; the adversaries, opposers and accusers of all spiritual belief systems that would try to hamper enjoyment of our life as a human being."

Post-LaVeyan Satanists, like the adherents of The Satanic Temple, argue that the human animal has a natural altruistic and communal tendency, and frame Satan as a figure of struggle against injustice and activism. They also believe in bodily autonomy, that personal beliefs should conform to science and inspire nobility, and that people should atone for their mistakes.

=== Theistic Satanism ===
Theistic Satanism, commonly referred to as "devil worship", views Satan as a deity, whom individuals may supplicate to. It consists of loosely affiliated or independent groups and cabals, which all agree that Satan is a real entity.

== Allegations of worship ==
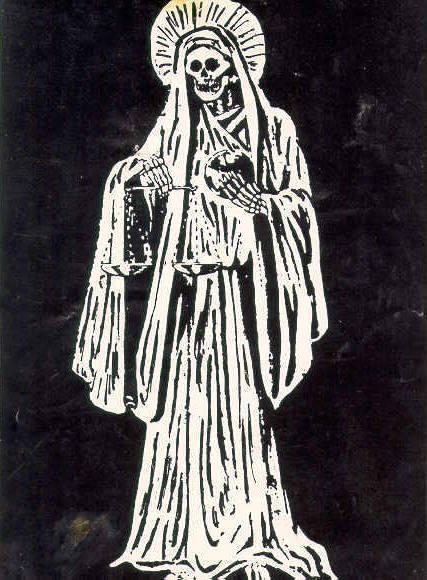
A depiction of Santa Muerte

The main deity in the tentatively Indo-European pantheon of the Yazidis, Melek Taus, is similar to the devil in Christian and Islamic traditions, as he refused to bow down before humanity. Therefore, Christians and Muslims often consider Melek Taus to be Satan. However, rather than being Satanic, Yazidism can be understood as a remnant of a pre-Islamic Middle Eastern Indo-European religion, and/or a ghulat Sufi movement founded by Shaykh Adi. In fact, there is no entity in Yazidism which represents evil in opposition to God; such dualism is rejected by Yazidis.

In the Middle Ages, the Cathars, practitioners of a dualistic religion, were accused of worshipping Satan by the Catholic Church. Pope Gregory IX stated in his work Vox in Rama that the Cathars believed that God had erred in casting Lucifer out of heaven and that Lucifer would return to reward his faithful. On the other hand, according to Catharism, the creator god of the material world worshipped by the Catholic Church is actually Satan.

Wicca is a modern, syncretic Neopagan religion whose practitioners many Christians have incorrectly assumed to worship Satan. In actuality, Wiccans do not believe in the existence of Satan or any analogous figure and have repeatedly and emphatically rejected the notion that they venerate such an entity.

The cult of the skeletal figure of Santa Muerte, which has grown exponentially in Mexico, has been denounced by the Catholic Church as Devil-worship. However, devotees of Santa Muerte view her as an angel of death created by God, and many of them identify as Catholic.

Much modern folklore about Satanism does not originate from the actual beliefs or practices of theistic or atheistic Satanists, but rather from a mixture of medieval Christian folk beliefs, political or sociological conspiracy theories, and contemporary urban legends. An example is the "Satanic ritual abuse" scare of the 1980s—beginning with the memoir Michelle Remembers—which depicted Satanism as a vast conspiracy of elites with a predilection for child abuse and human sacrifice. This genre frequently describes Satan as physically incarnating in order to receive worship.

== In culture ==
=== In visual art ===
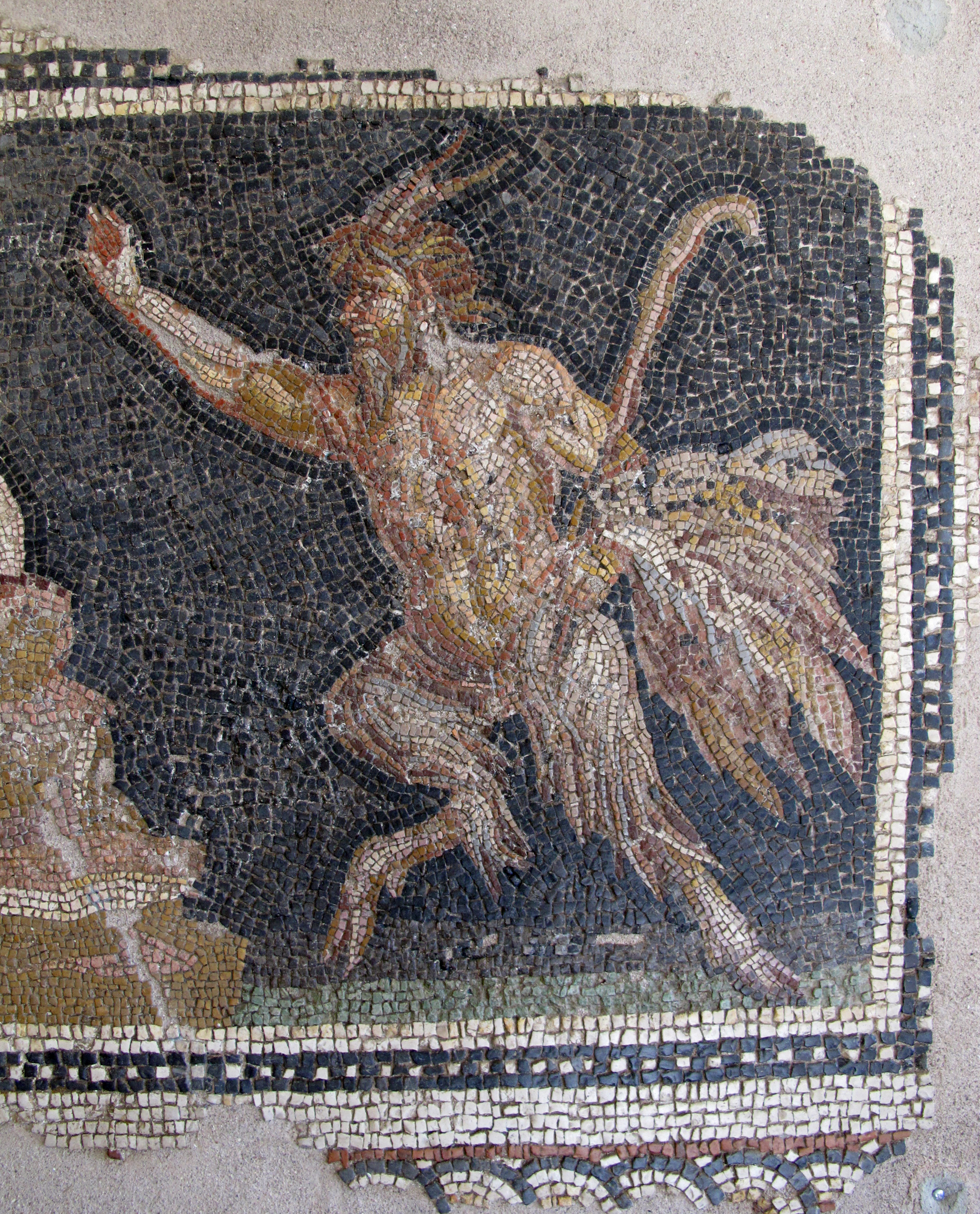
Ancient Roman mosaic showing a horned, goat-legged Pan holding a shepherd's crook. Much of Satan's traditional iconography is apparently derived from Pan.

Satan's appearance is not described in the Bible or in early Christian writings, though Paul the Apostle does write that "Satan disguises himself as an angel of light" (2 Corinthians 11:14). Satan was never shown in early Christian artwork and may have first appeared in the sixth century in one of the mosaics of the Basilica of Sant'Apollinare Nuovo. The mosaic "Christ the Good Sheppard" features a blue-violet angel at the left hand side of Christ behind three goats.

Depictions of Satan became more common in the ninth century, where he is shown with cloven hooves, hairy legs, the tail of a goat, pointed ears, a beard, a flat nose, and a set of horns. Satan may have first become associated with goats through the Parable of the Sheep and the Goats, recorded in Matthew 25:31–46, in which Jesus separates sheep (representing the saved) from goats (representing the damned); the damned are thrown into an "everlasting fire" along with Satan and his angels.

Medieval Christians were known to adapt previously existing pagan iconography to suit depictions of Christian figures. Much of Satan's traditional iconography in Christianity appears to be derived from Pan, a rustic, goat-legged fertility god in ancient Greek religion. Early Christian writers such as Saint Jerome equated the Greek satyrs and the Roman fauns, whom Pan resembled, with demons. Satan's pitchfork appears to have been adapted from the trident wielded by the Greek god Poseidon and Satan's flame-like hair seems to have originated from the Egyptian god Bes. By the High Middle Ages, Satan and devils appear in all works of Christian art: in paintings, sculptures, and on cathedrals. Satan is usually depicted naked, but his genitals are rarely shown and are often covered by animal furs. The goat-like portrayal of Satan was especially closely associated with him in his role as the object of worship by sorcerers and as the incubus, a demon believed to rape human women in their sleep.

Italian frescoes from the late Middle Ages onward frequently show Satan chained in Hell, feeding on the bodies of the perpetually damned. These frescoes are early enough to have inspired Dante's portrayal in his Inferno. As the serpent in the Garden of Eden, Satan is often shown as a snake with arms and legs as well as the head and full-breasted upper torso of a woman. Satan and his demons could take any form in medieval art, but, when appearing in their true form, they were often shown as short, hairy, black-skinned humanoids with clawed and bird feet and extra faces on their chests, bellies, genitals, buttocks, and tails. The modern popular culture image of Satan as a well-dressed gentleman with small horns and a tail originates from portrayals of Mephistopheles in the operas La damnation de Faust (1846) by Hector Berlioz, Mefistofele (1868) by Arrigo Boito, and Faust by Charles Gounod.

Illustrations of Satan in Islamic paintings often depict him black-faced, a feature which would later symbolize any satanic figure or heretic, and with a black body, to symbolize his corrupted nature. Another common depiction of Iblis shows him wearing a special head covering, clearly different from the traditional Islamic turban. In one painting, however, Iblis wears a traditional Islamic head covering. The turban probably refers to a narration of Iblis' fall: there he wore a turban, then he was sent down from heaven. Many other pictures show and describe Iblis at the moment when the angels prostrate themselves before Adam. Here, he is usually seen beyond the outcrop, his face transformed, with his wings burned, to the envious countenance of a devil. Iblis and his cohorts (div or shayatin) are often portrayed in Turko-Persian art as bangled creatures with flaming eyes, only covered by a short skirt. Similar to European artists, who took traits of pagan deities to depict devils, they depicted such demons often in a similar fashion to that of Hindu deities.

=== In literature ===
If he was once as handsome as he now is ugly and, despite that, raised his brows against his Maker, one can understand,
how every sorrow has its source in him!

— Dante in Inferno, Canto XXXIV (Verse translation by Allen Mandelbaum)

Here we may reign secure, and in my choice
to reign is worth ambition though in Hell:
Better to reign in Hell, than serve in Heaven.

— Satan in John Milton's Paradise Lost Book I, lines 261–263

In Dante Alighieri's Inferno, Satan appears as a giant demon, frozen mid-breast in ice at the center of the Ninth Circle of Hell. Satan has three faces and a pair of bat-like wings affixed under each chin. In his three mouths, Satan gnaws on Brutus, Judas Iscariot, and Cassius, whom Dante regarded as having betrayed the "two greatest heroes of the human race": Julius Caesar, the founder of the new order of government, and Jesus, the founder of the new order of religion. As Satan beats his wings, he creates a cold wind that continues to freeze the ice surrounding him and the other sinners in the Ninth Circle. Dante and Virgil climb up Satan's shaggy legs until gravity is reversed and they fall through the earth into the southern hemisphere.

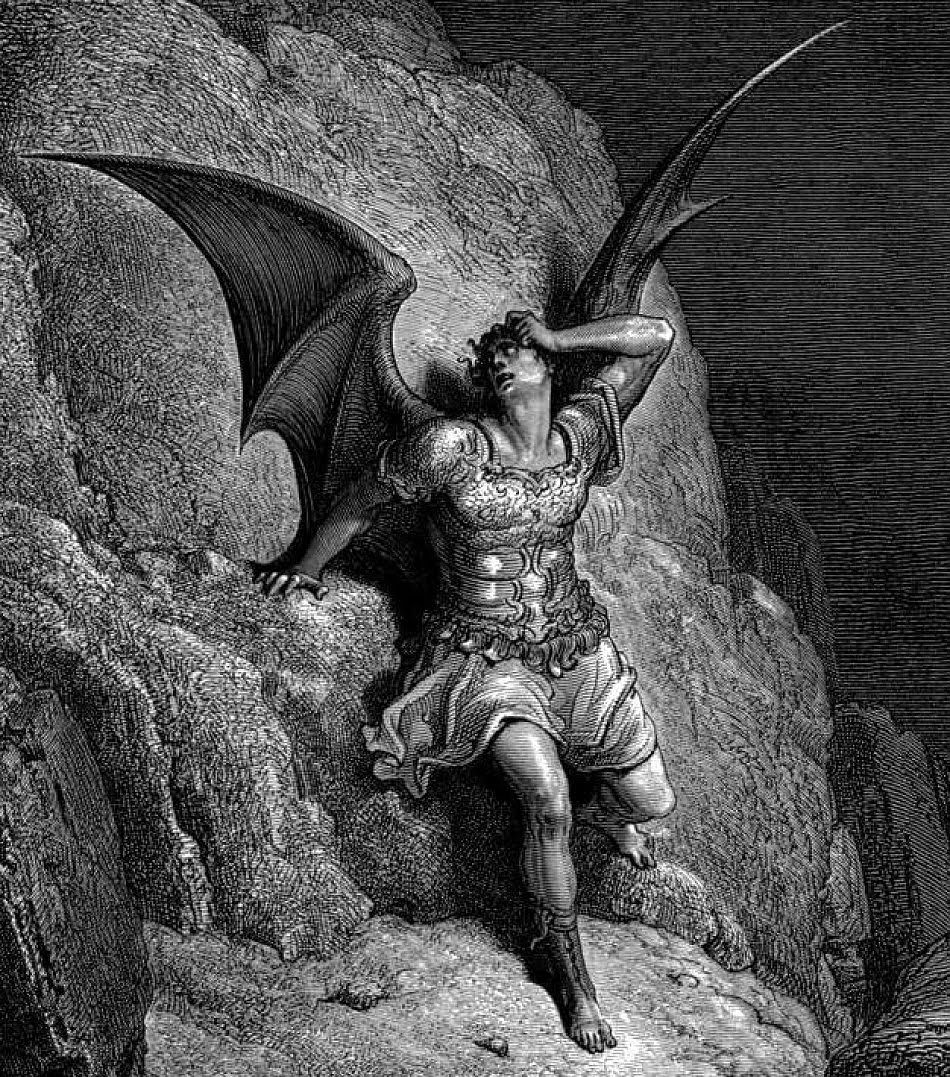
Satan in Paradise Lost, as illustrated by Gustave Doré

Satan appears in several stories from The Canterbury Tales by Geoffrey Chaucer, including "The Summoner's Prologue", in which a friar arrives in Hell and sees no other friars, but is told there are millions. Then Satan lifts his tail to reveal that all of the friars live inside his anus. Chaucer's description of Satan's appearance is clearly based on Dante's. The legend of Faust, recorded in the 1589 chapbook The History of the Damnable Life and the Deserved Death of Doctor John Faustus, concerns a pact allegedly made by the German scholar Johann Georg Faust with a demon named Mephistopheles, agreeing to sell his soul to Satan in exchange for twenty-four years of earthly pleasure. This chapbook became the source for Christopher Marlowe's The Tragical History of the Life and Death of Doctor Faustus.

John Milton's epic poem Paradise Lost features Satan as its main protagonist. Milton portrays Satan as a tragic antihero destroyed by his own hubris. The poem, which draws extensive inspiration from Greek tragedy, recreates Satan as a complex literary character, who dares to rebel against the "tyranny" of God in spite of God's own omnipotence. The English poet and painter William Blake famously quipped that "The reason Milton wrote in fetters when he wrote of Angels & God, and at liberty when of Devils & Hell, is because he was a true poet and of the Devils party without knowing it." Paradise Regained, the sequel to Paradise Lost, is a retelling of Satan's temptation of Jesus in the desert.

William Blake regarded Satan as a model of rebellion against unjust authority and featured him in many of his poems and illustrations, including his 1780 book The Marriage of Heaven and Hell, in which Satan is celebrated as the ultimate rebel, the incarnation of human emotion and the epitome of freedom from all forms of reason and orthodoxy. Based on the Biblical passages portraying Satan as the accuser of sin, Blake interpreted Satan as "a promulgator of moral laws".

=== In music ===
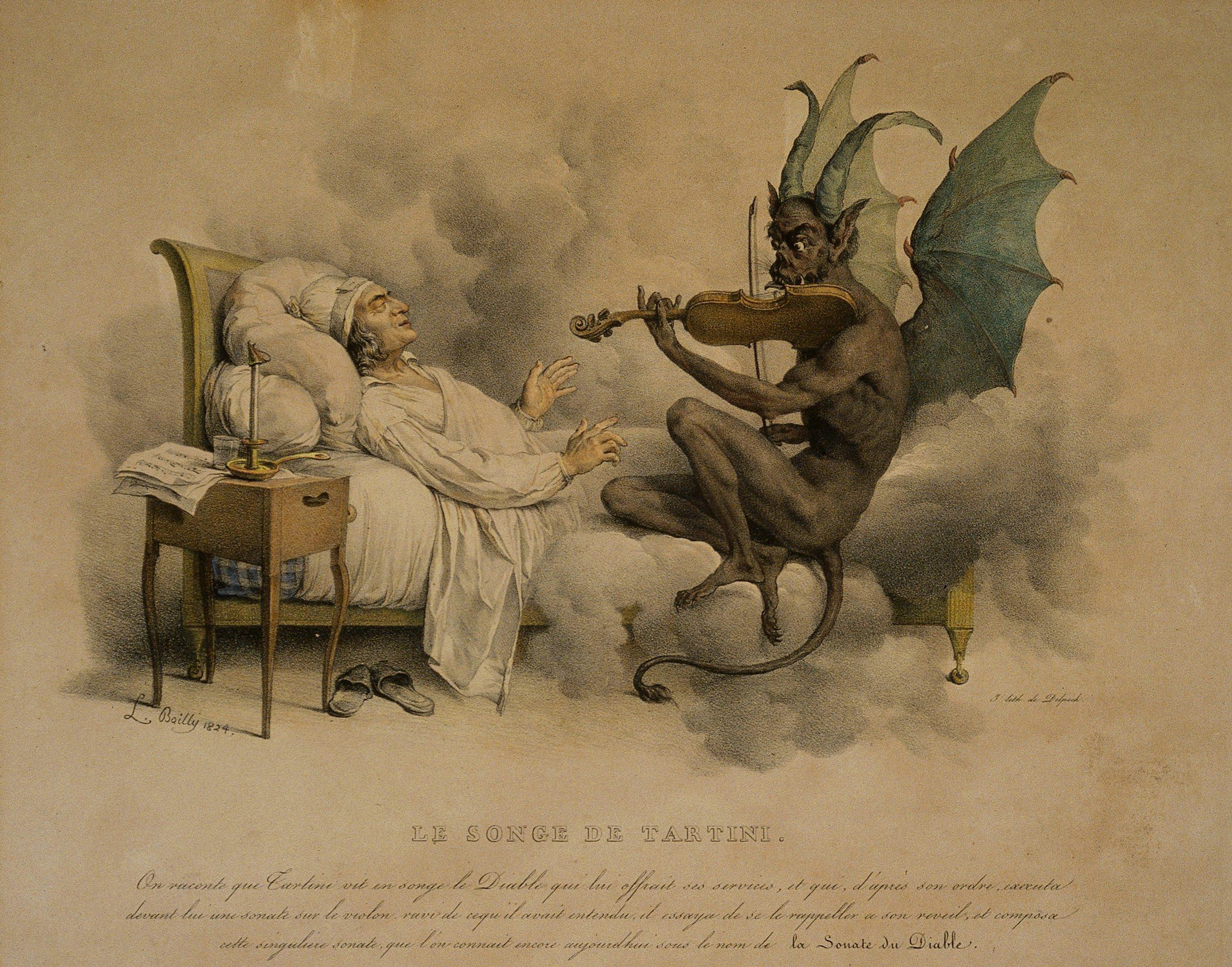
Tartini's Dream (1824) by Louis-Léopold Boilly

References to Satan in music can be dated back to the Middle Ages. Giuseppe Tartini was inspired to write his most famous work, the Violin Sonata in G minor, also known as "The Devil's Trill", after dreaming of the Devil playing the violin. Tartini claimed that the sonata was a lesser imitation of what the Devil had played in his dream. Niccolò Paganini was believed to have derived his musical talent from a deal with the Devil. Charles Gounod's Faust features a narrative that involves Satan.

In the early 1900s, jazz and blues became known as the "Devil's Music" as they were considered "dangerous and unholy". According to legend, blues musician Tommy Johnson was a terrible guitarist before exchanging his soul to the Devil for a guitar. Later, Robert Johnson claimed that he had sold his soul in return for becoming a great blues guitarist. Satanic symbolism appears in rock music from the 1960s. Mick Jagger assumes the role of Lucifer in the Rolling Stones' "Sympathy for the Devil" (1968), while Black Sabbath portrayed the Devil in numerous songs, including "War Pigs" (1970) and "N.I.B." (1970).

=== In film and television ===
The Haunted Castle (1896) (3:12)

The Devil is depicted as a vampire bat in Georges Méliès' The Haunted Castle (1896), which is often considered the first horror film. So-called "Black Masses" have been portrayed in sensationalist B-movies since the 1960s. One of the first films to portray such a ritual was the 1965 film Eye of the Devil, also known as 13. Alex Sanders, a former black magician, served as a consultant on the film to ensure that the rituals portrayed in it were depicted accurately. Over the next thirty years, the novels of Dennis Wheatley and the films of Hammer Film Productions both played a major role in shaping the popular image of Satanism.

The film version of Ira Levin's Rosemary's Baby made Satanic themes a staple of mainstream horror fiction. Later films such as The Exorcist (1973), The Omen (1976), Angel Heart (1987) and The Devil's Advocate (1997) feature Satan as an antagonist. The Turkish horror film Semum (2008) is based the representation of Satan in Islamic scriptures.

== See also ==
- Cernunnos
- Cythraul
- Hades
- Hel
- Man of sin
- Prince of Darkness (Satan)
- Prince of Darkness (Manichaeism)
- saṭani
- Set (deity)
