= Lucifer (Stuck) =

Painting by Franz Stuck

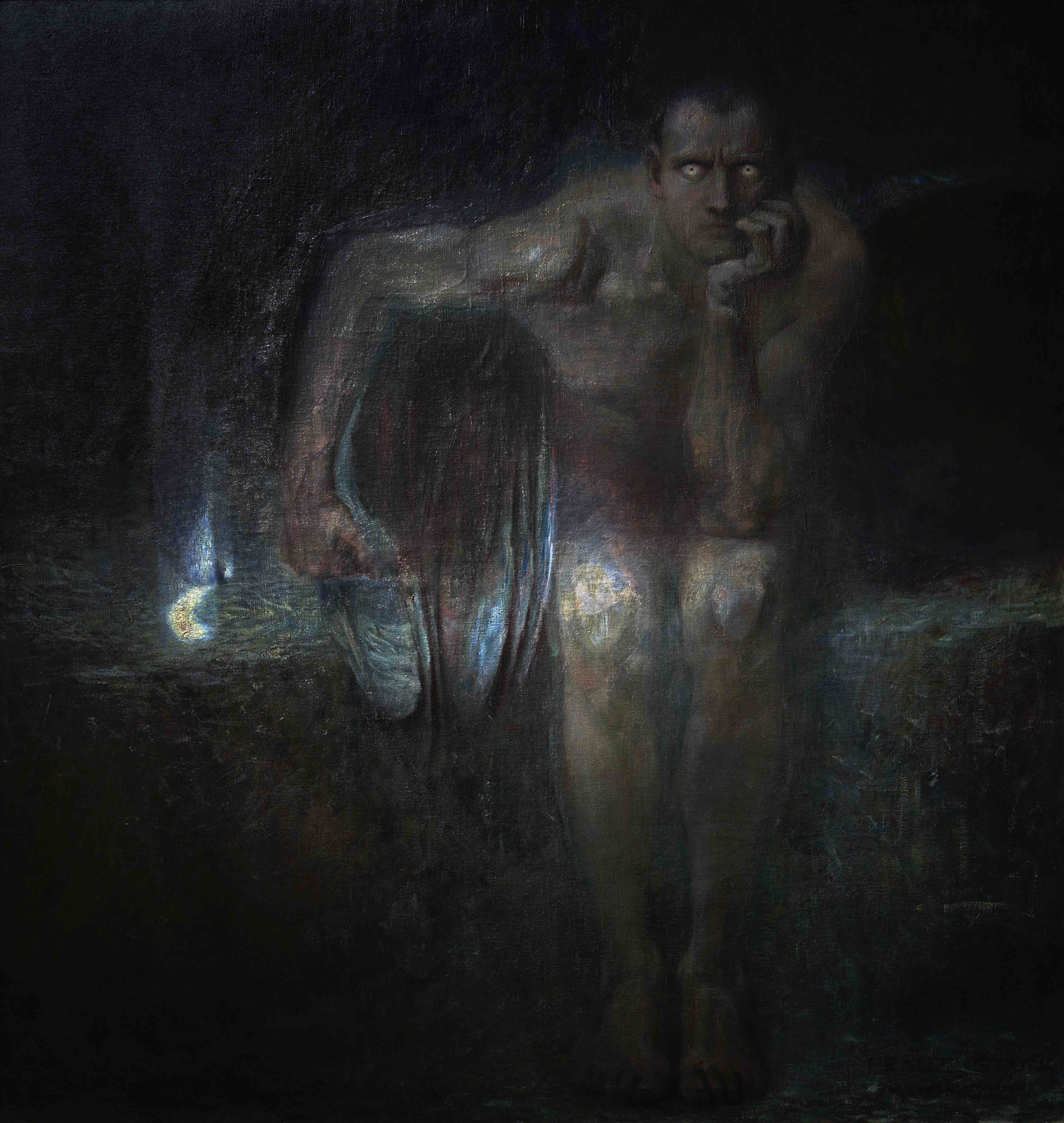
- Artist: Franz Stuck
- Year: 1890
- Medium: oil on canvas
- Dimensions: 161 cm × 152.5 cm (63 in × 60.0 in)
- Location: National Gallery for Foreign Art, Sofia

Lucifer is an oil on canvas painting by the German artist Franz Stuck, from 1890. He was one of the founders of the Munich Secession. The painting belongs to Stuck's "dark monumental" period, presenting an image of "man-demon".

== History ==
Ferdinand I of Bulgaria bought the painting for the royal collection in Sofia, from Stuck's studio in Munich in 1891. On 25 December 1930, King Boris III added it to the National Museum and from 1948 it was part of the National Art Gallery. In 1985, it was transferred to the National Gallery for Foreign Art; since 2015, it has been in the Fund Gallery "Square 500".

== Exhibitions ==
The picture has been shown in numerous international exhibitions:

1972 – German art around 1900 in Berlin
2000 – The kingdom of the spirit. The development of the German symbolism 1870–1920 in Frankfurt, Birmingham and Stockholm
2005–2006 – History of melancholy in Paris and Berlin
2006–2007 – Franz von Stuck. The modern Lucifer in Trento
2008–2009 – Masterpieces of Franz von Stuck in Munich
2010 – Crime and Punishment in Paris
2021–2022 – Inferno in Rome
